= Koče, Postojna =

Koče
- Village
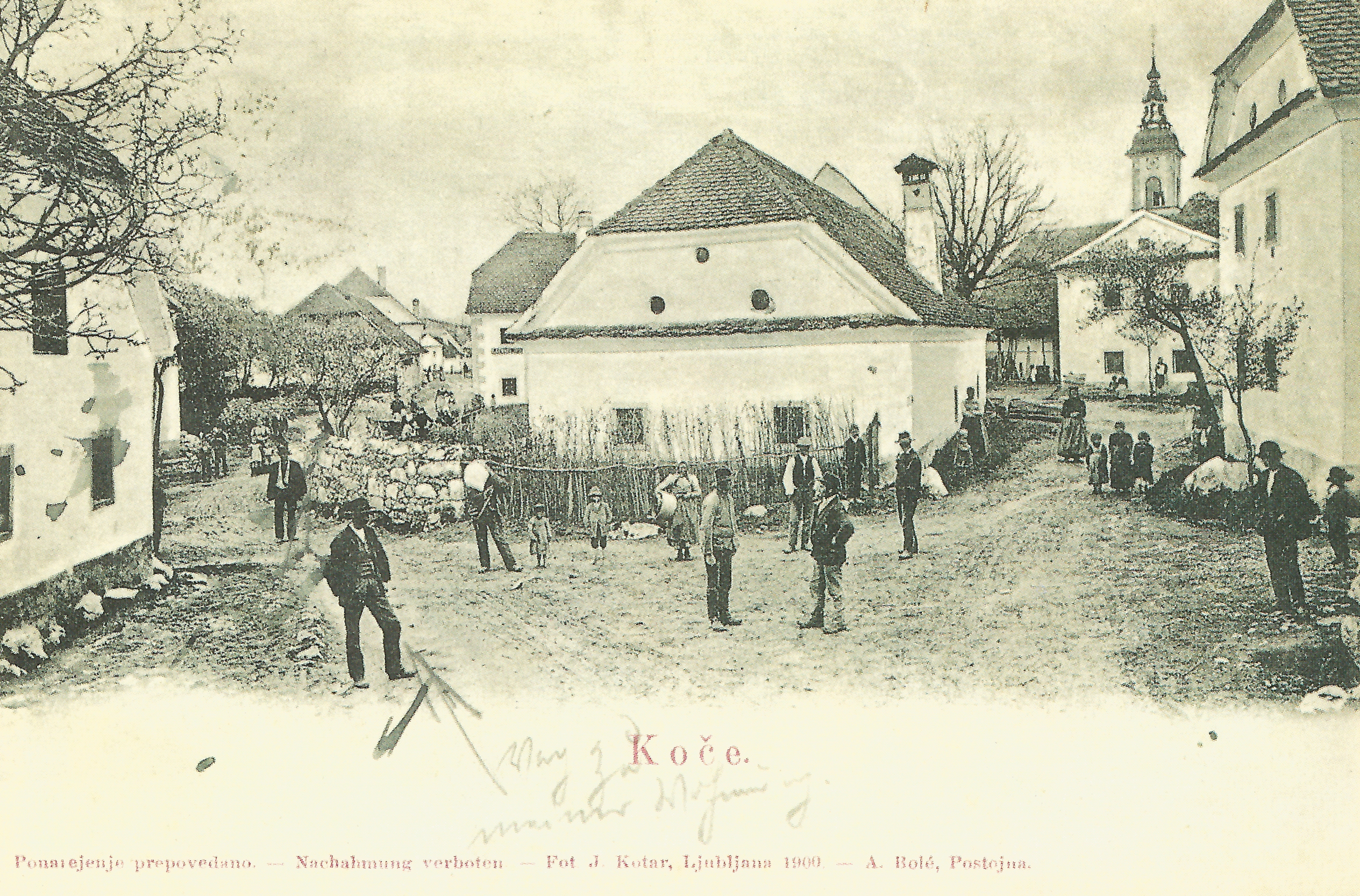
- 1900 postcard of Koče

- Location in Slovenia
- Coordinates: 45°43′15.66″N 14°10′51.24″E
- Country: Slovenia
- Traditional region: Inner Carniola
- Statistical region: Littoral–Inner Carniola
- Municipality: Postojna

Area
  - Total: 4.08 km^{2} (1.58 sq mi)
- Elevation: 534.9 m (1,755 ft)

Population (2002)
  - Total: 235

Koče (pronounced [ˈkoːtʃɛ]; Italian: Cocce) is a village south of Postojna in the Inner Carniola region of Slovenia.

The local church in the settlement is dedicated to Saint Margaret and belongs to the Parish of Slavina.
