= Rakitnik =

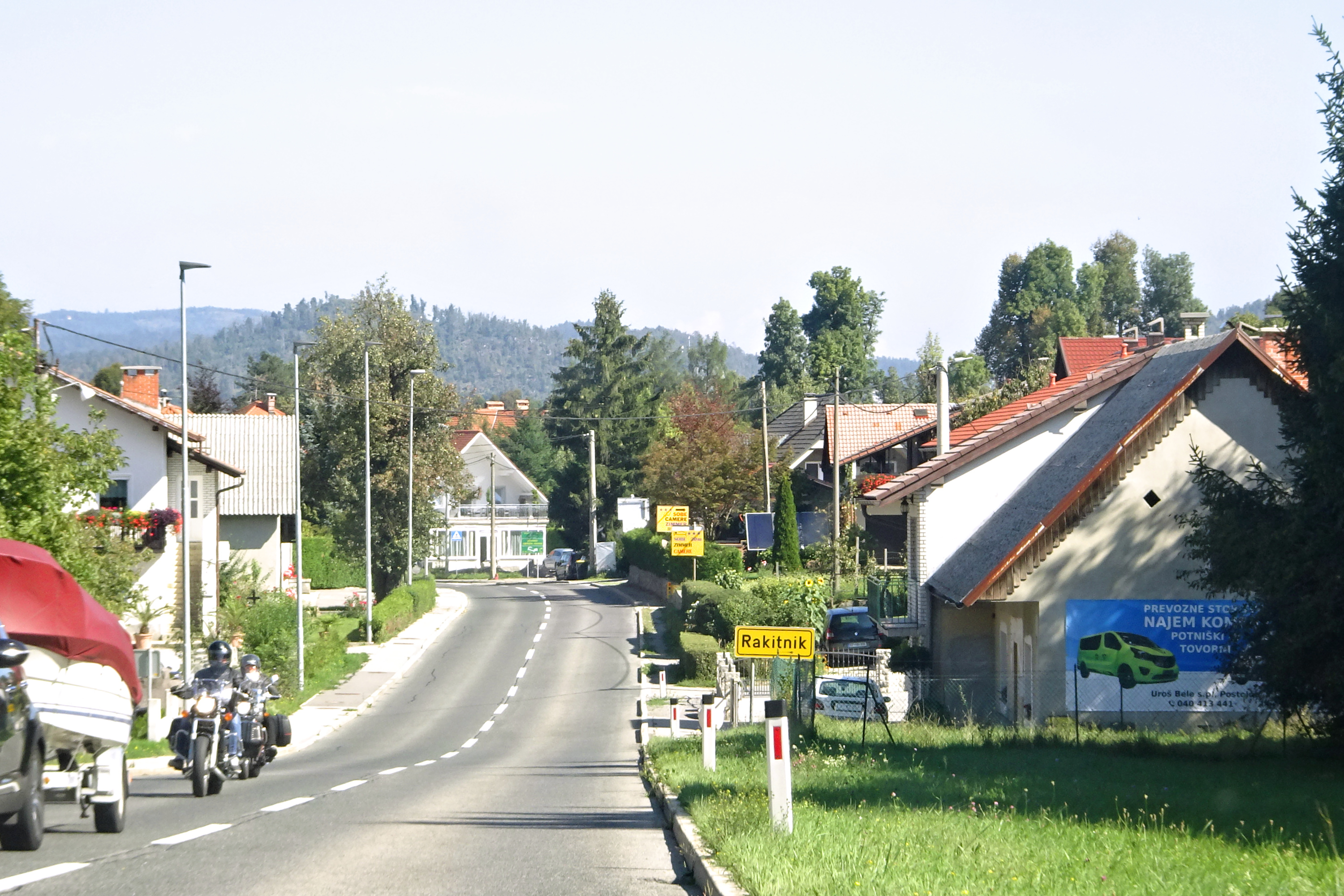

- Location in Slovenia
- Coordinates: 45°44′50.29″N 14°11′42.61″E
- Country: Slovenia
- Traditional region: Inner Carniola
- Statistical region: Littoral–Inner Carniola
- Municipality: Postojna

Area
  - Total: 1.93 km^{2} (0.75 sq mi)
- Elevation: 522.4 m (1,714 ft)

Population (2002)
  - Total: 159

Rakitnik (pronounced [ɾaˈkiːtnik]; Italian: Rachiteni) is a village settlement south of Postojna in the Inner Carniola region of Slovenia.

The Postojna Airfield, sometimes also referred to as the Rakitnik Airfield, a grass-covered sports airfield, is located just north of the settlement.

== Church ==
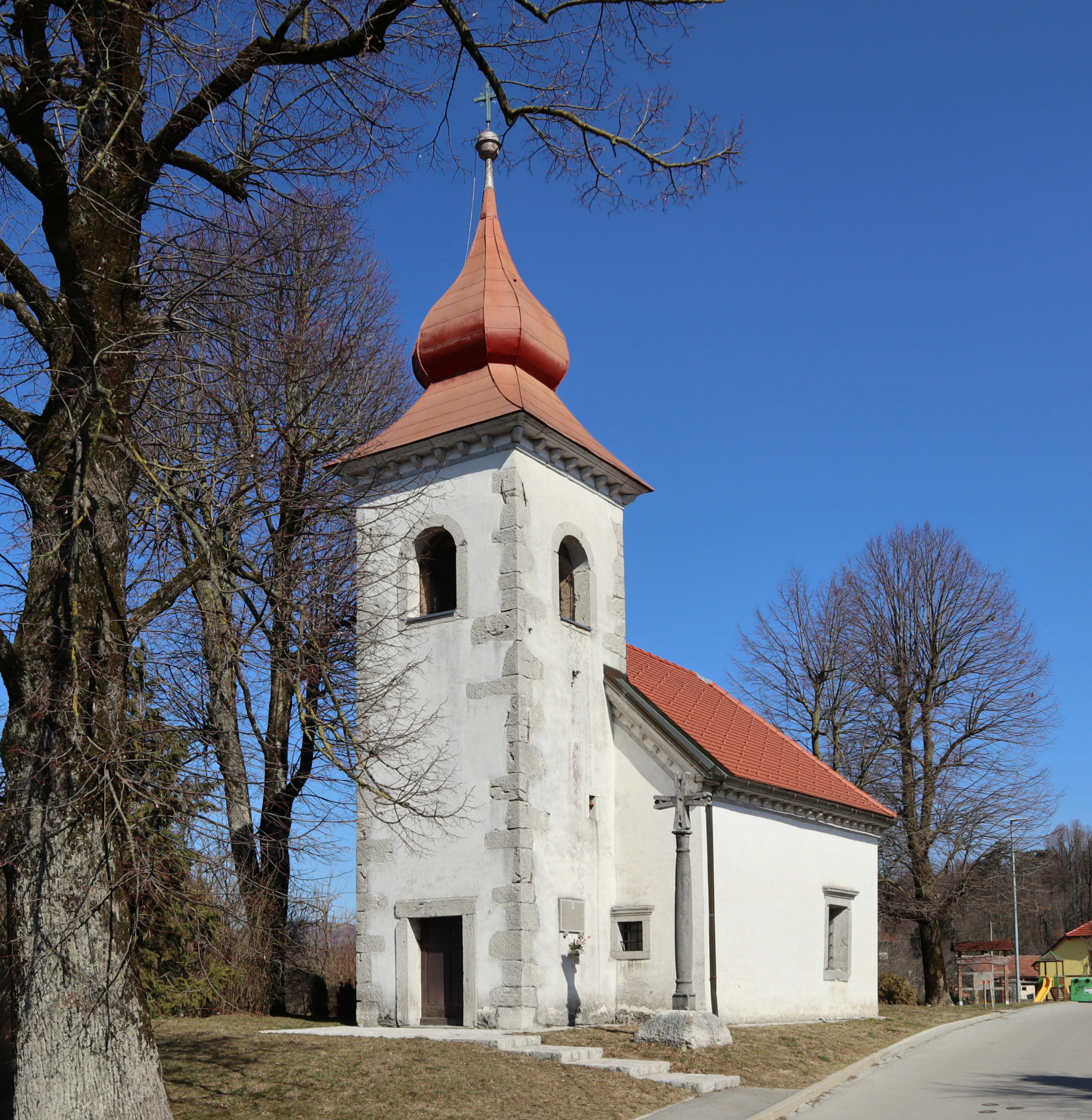
Betrothal of Mary Church

The local church is dedicated to the Betrothal of Mary and belongs to the Parish of Matenja Vas.
