= Dilce =

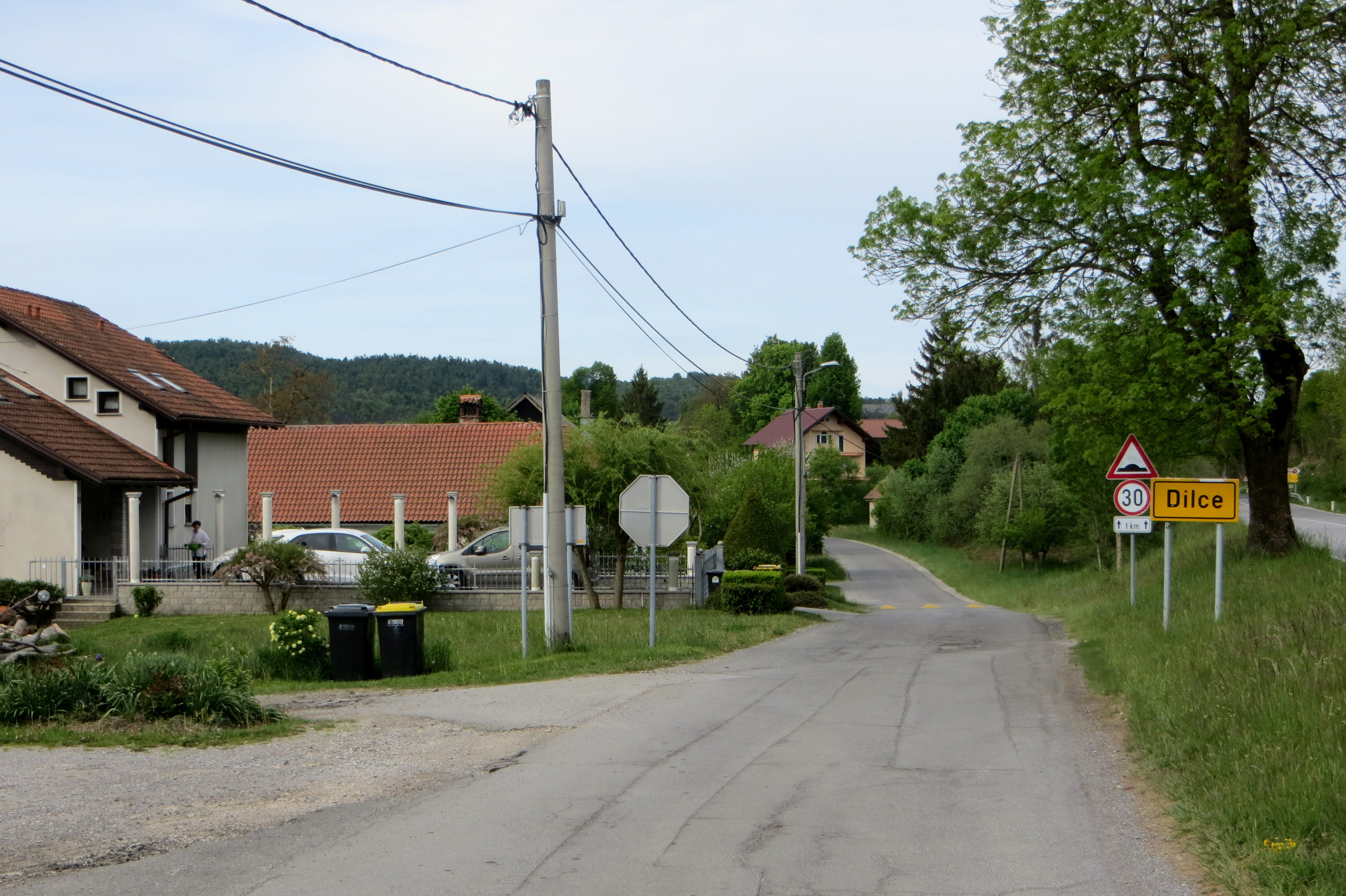

- Location in Slovenia
- Coordinates: 45°46′2.53″N 14°8′1.72″E
- Country: Slovenia
- Traditional region: Inner Carniola
- Statistical region: Littoral–Inner Carniola
- Municipality: Postojna

Area
  - Total: 0.35 km^{2} (0.14 sq mi)
- Elevation: 540.5 m (1,773 ft)

Population (2002)
  - Total: 131

Dilce (pronounced [ˈdiːltsɛ]) is a small settlement west of Postojna in the Inner Carniola region of Slovenia. Dilce was a hamlet of Goriče until 1994, when it was separated and made an independent settlement.
