= Lohača =

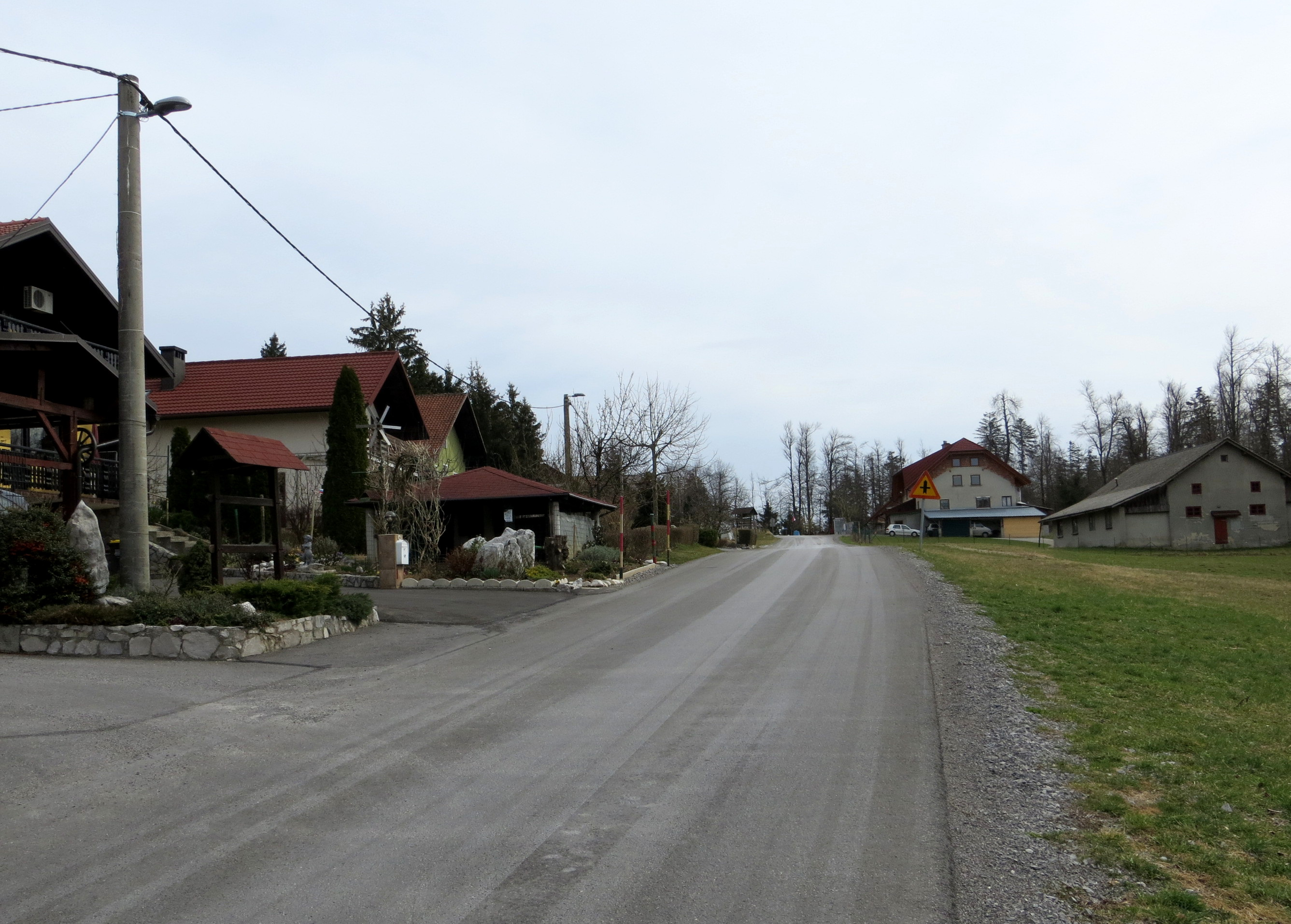

- Location in Slovenia
- Coordinates: 45°49′48.03″N 14°12′36.25″E
- Country: Slovenia
- Traditional region: Inner Carniola
- Statistical region: Littoral–Inner Carniola
- Municipality: Postojna

Area
  - Total: 1.47 km^{2} (0.57 sq mi)
- Elevation: 735.3 m (2,412 ft)

Population (2002)
  - Total: 25

Lohača (pronounced [lɔˈxaːtʃa]) is a small village in the hills west of Planina in the Municipality of Postojna in the Inner Carniola region of Slovenia.

== History ==
Lohača was administratively separated from Strmca in 1994 and made an independent settlement.
