= Veliki Otok, Slovenia =

Veliki Otok
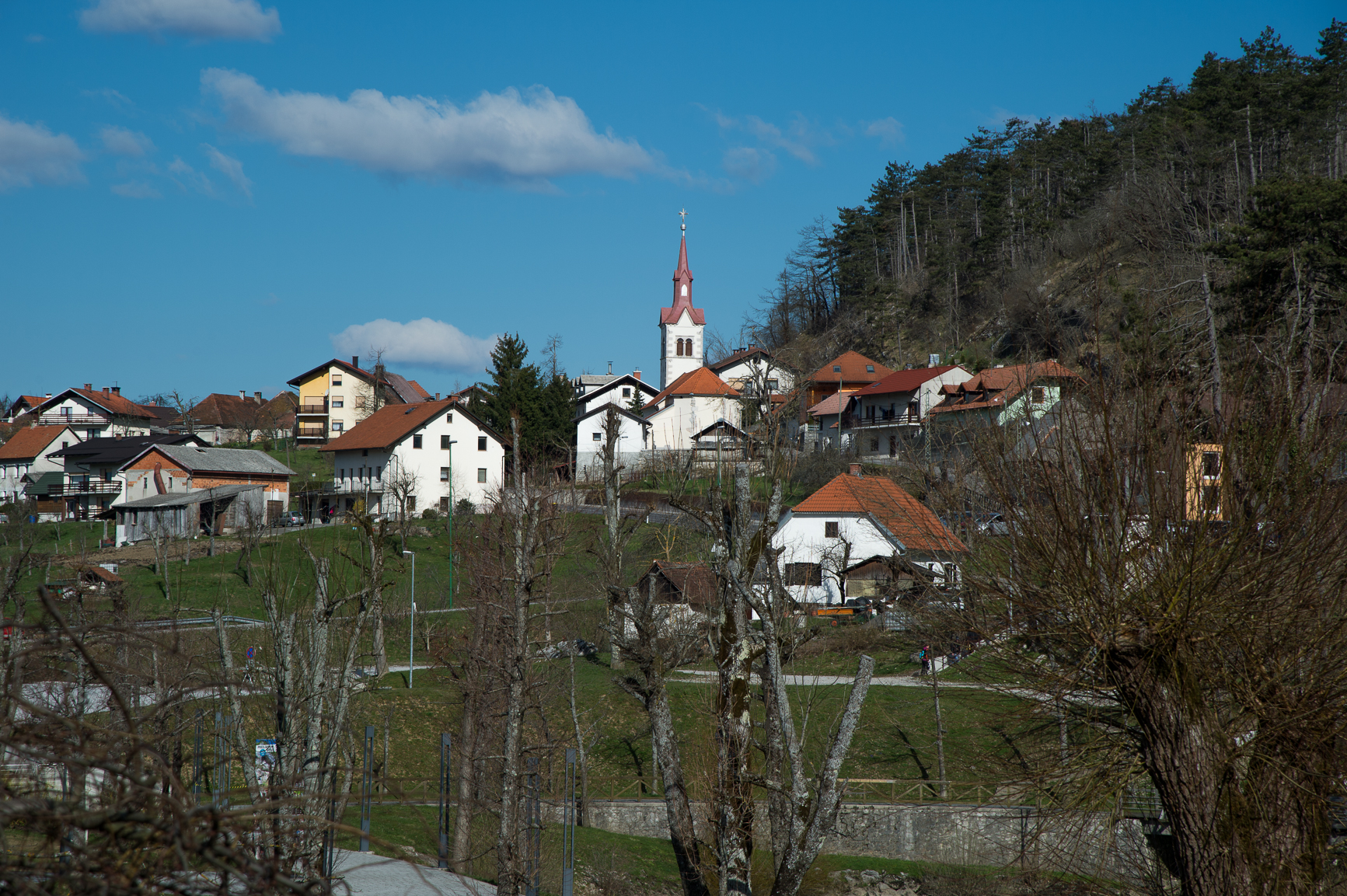

- Location in Slovenia
- Coordinates: 45°46′58.57″N 14°11′43.08″E
- Country: Slovenia
- Traditional region: Inner Carniola
- Statistical region: Littoral–Inner Carniola
- Municipality: Postojna

Area
  - Total: 17.32 km^{2} (6.69 sq mi)
- Elevation: 539.8 m (1,771 ft)

Population (2002)
  - Total: 148

Veliki Otok (pronounced [ˈʋeːliki ˈɔːtɔk]; German: Großotok, Italian: Ottocco Grande) is a village north of Postojna in the Inner Carniola region of Slovenia. The entrance to Postojna Cave lies immediately east of the village. A second karst cave, known as Otok Cave (Slovene: Otoška jama), lies 1 km north of the settlement.

The church in the centre of the settlement is dedicated to Saint Catherine. A second church on a small hill close to the entrance to Otok Cave is dedicated to Saint Andrew. Both belong to the Parish of Postojna.
