= Orehek, Postojna =

Orehek
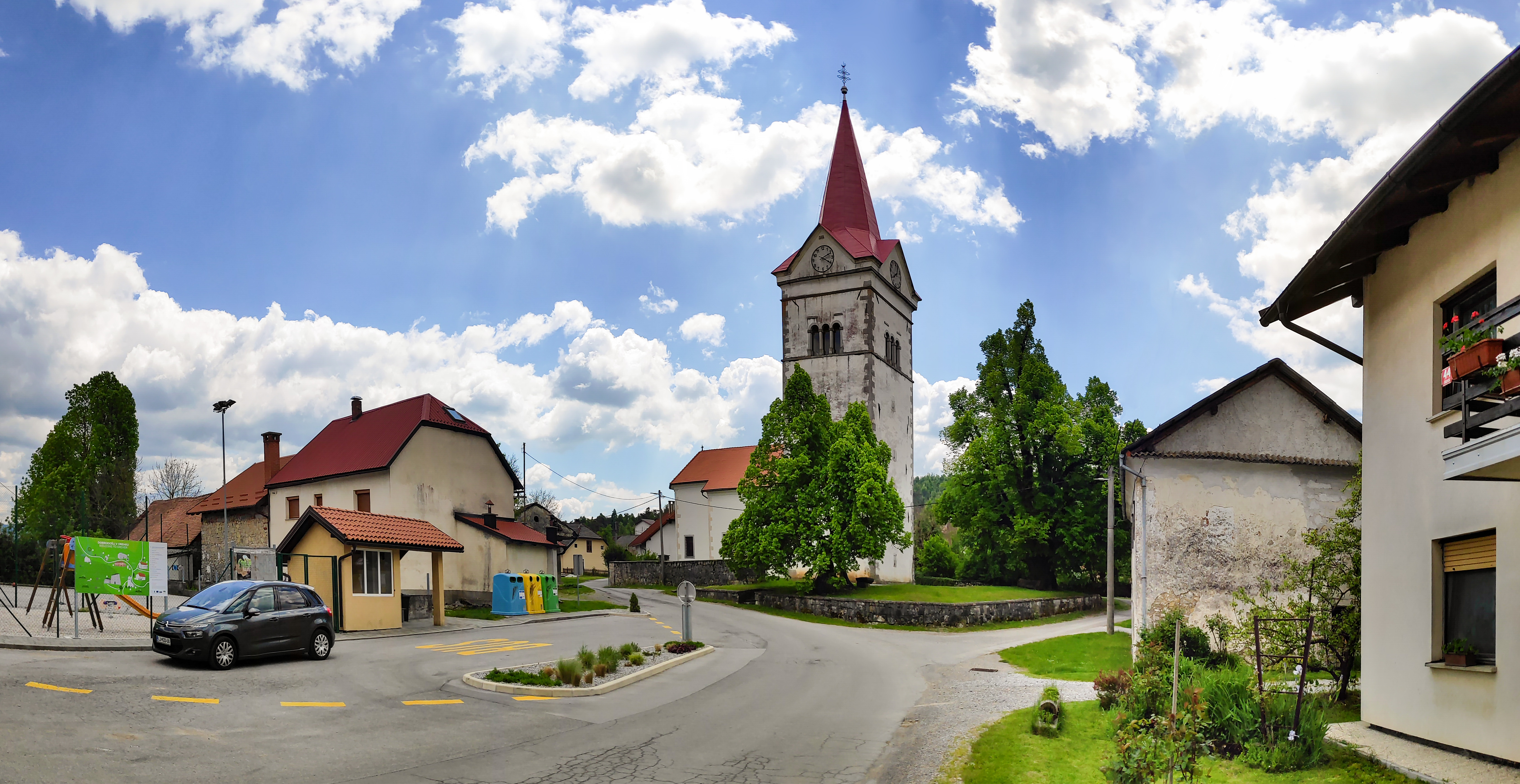

- Location in Slovenia
- Coordinates: 45°44′56.67″N 14°9′13.99″E
- Country: Slovenia
- Traditional region: Inner Carniola
- Statistical region: Littoral–Inner Carniola
- Municipality: Postojna

Area
  - Total: 9.09 km^{2} (3.51 sq mi)
- Elevation: 564.1 m (1,851 ft)

Population (2002)
  - Total: 189

Orehek (pronounced [ɔˈɾeːxək]; German: Nußdorf, Italian: Orecca) is a village southwest of Postojna in the Inner Carniola region of Slovenia.

The parish church in the settlement is dedicated to Saint Florian and belongs to the Koper Diocese. A second church is built just outside the settlement next to the cemetery and is dedicated to Saint Lawrence.

== Nussdorf Castle ==
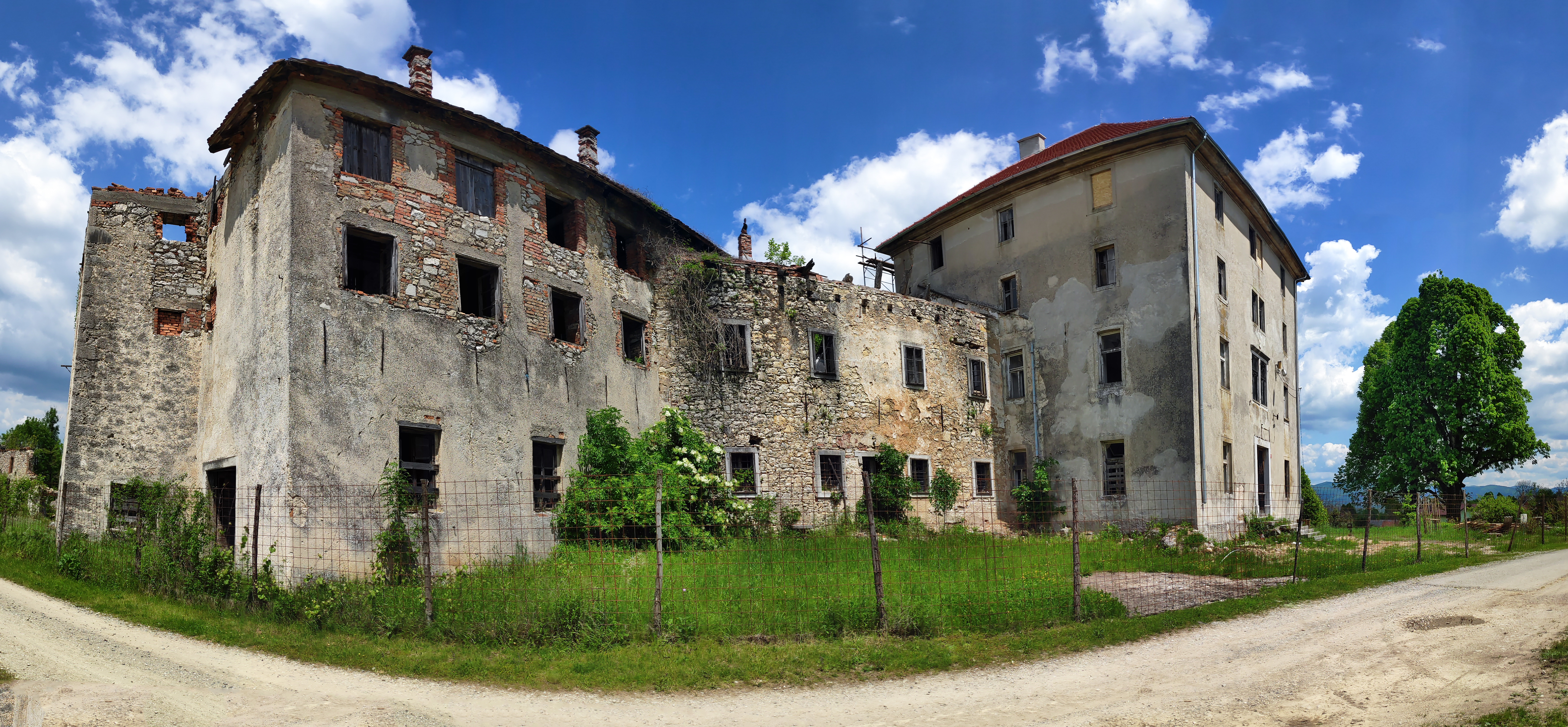
Nussdorf Castle in 2021

Nussdorf Castle (Slovene: Grad Orehek) is 13th-century castle on a small hill above the village. The collection of buildings showcases architectural styles dating from the 16th to the early 20th century. Still visible are remnants of defensive walls and perimeter towers. The central keep was significantly altered in the 20th century. Among its former owners are a number of prominent Carniolan noble families, including the Counts of Thurn and the princely family Porcia.
