= Rakulik =

- Location in Slovenia
- Coordinates: 45°44′27.51″N 14°7′47.46″E
- Country: Slovenia
- Traditional region: Inner Carniola
- Statistical region: Littoral–Inner Carniola
- Municipality: Postojna

Area
  - Total: 4.7 km^{2} (1.8 sq mi)
- Elevation: 591.6 m (1,941 ft)

Population (2002)
  - Total: 12

Rakulik (pronounced [ɾaˈkuːlik]) is a small settlement in the hills south of Hruševje in the Municipality of Postojna in the Inner Carniola region of Slovenia.

The local church, built on a small hill north of the settlement, is dedicated to Saint John of Nepomuk and belongs to the Parish of Hrenovice.
