= Velika Brda =

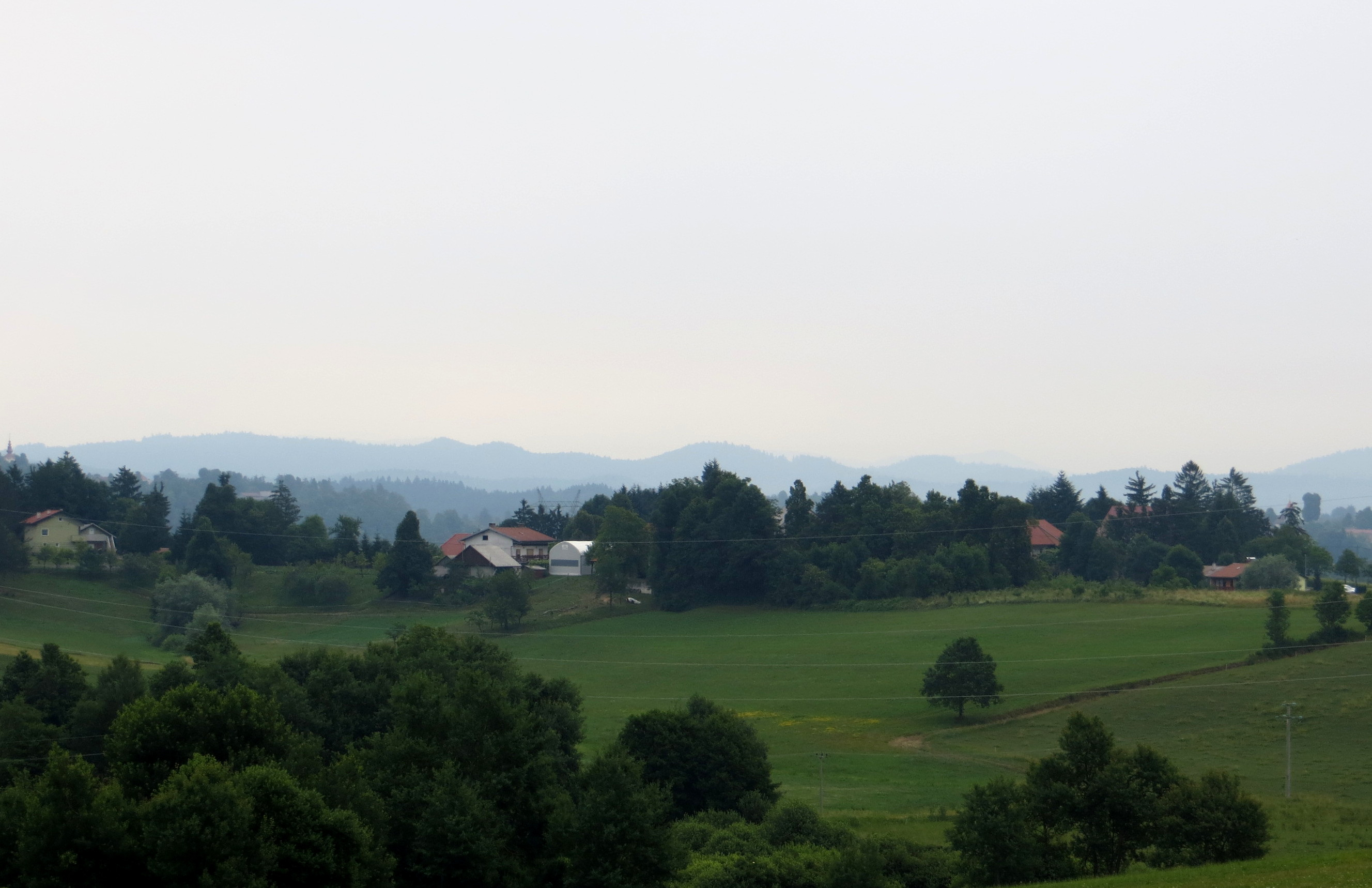

- Location in Slovenia
- Coordinates: 45°46′18.38″N 14°6′34.45″E
- Country: Slovenia
- Traditional region: Inner Carniola
- Statistical region: Littoral–Inner Carniola
- Municipality: Postojna

Area
  - Total: 2.44 km^{2} (0.94 sq mi)
- Elevation: 552.4 m (1,812 ft)

Population (2025)
  - Total: 39

Velika Brda (pronounced [ˈʋeːlika ˈbəɾda]; Italian: Berdo Grande) is a small village north of Hruševje in the Municipality of Postojna in the Inner Carniola region of Slovenia.
