= Strane, Postojna =

Strane
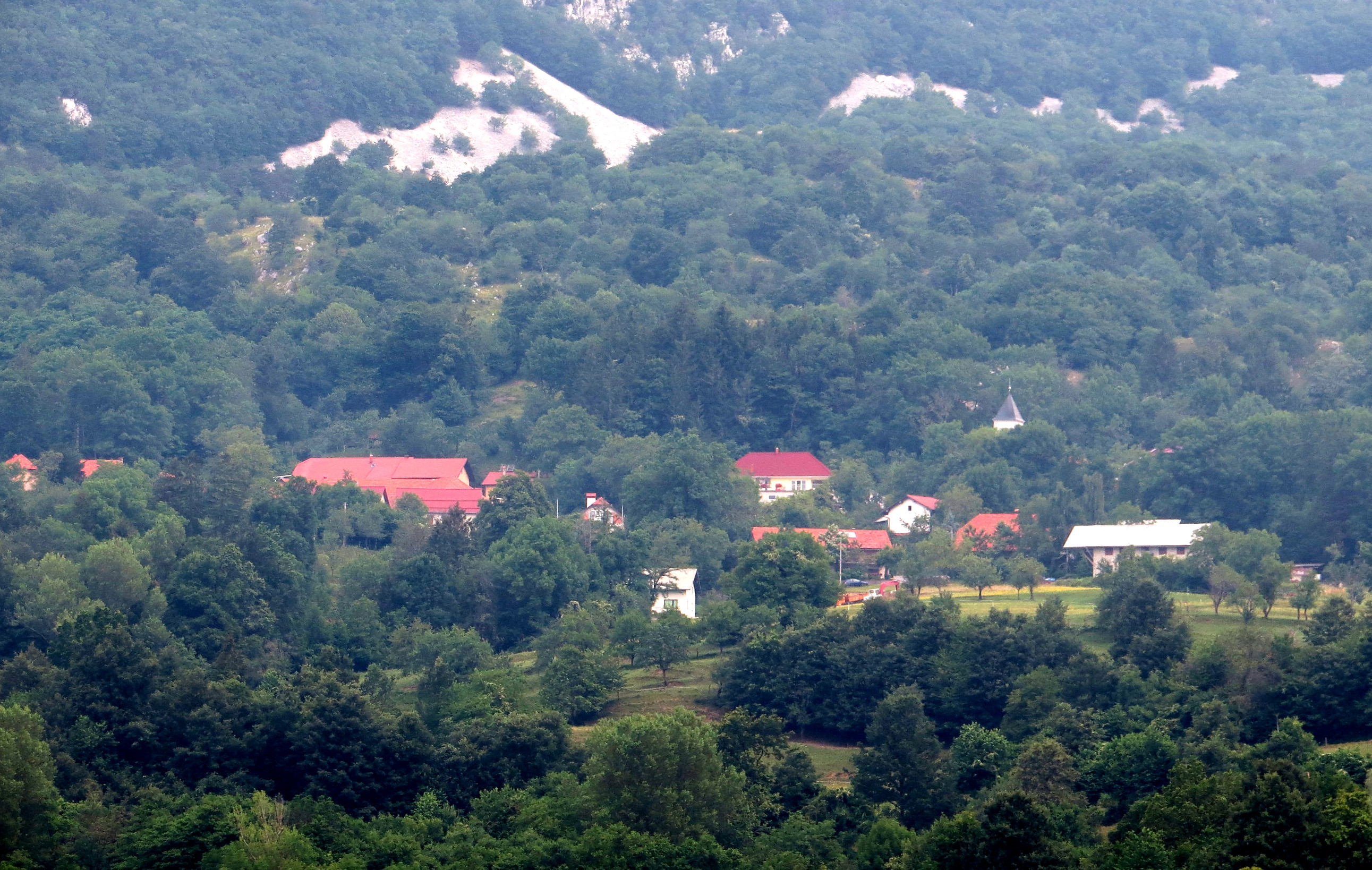

- Location in Slovenia
- Coordinates: 45°47′12.53″N 14°5′18.12″E
- Country: Slovenia
- Traditional region: Inner Carniola
- Statistical region: Littoral–Inner Carniola
- Municipality: Postojna

Area
  - Total: 6.16 km^{2} (2.38 sq mi)
- Elevation: 658 m (2,159 ft)

Population (2002)
  - Total: 72

Strane (pronounced [ˈstɾaːnɛ]) is a small village below the eastern slopes of Mount Nanos in the Municipality of Postojna in the Inner Carniola region of Slovenia.

== Yew ==
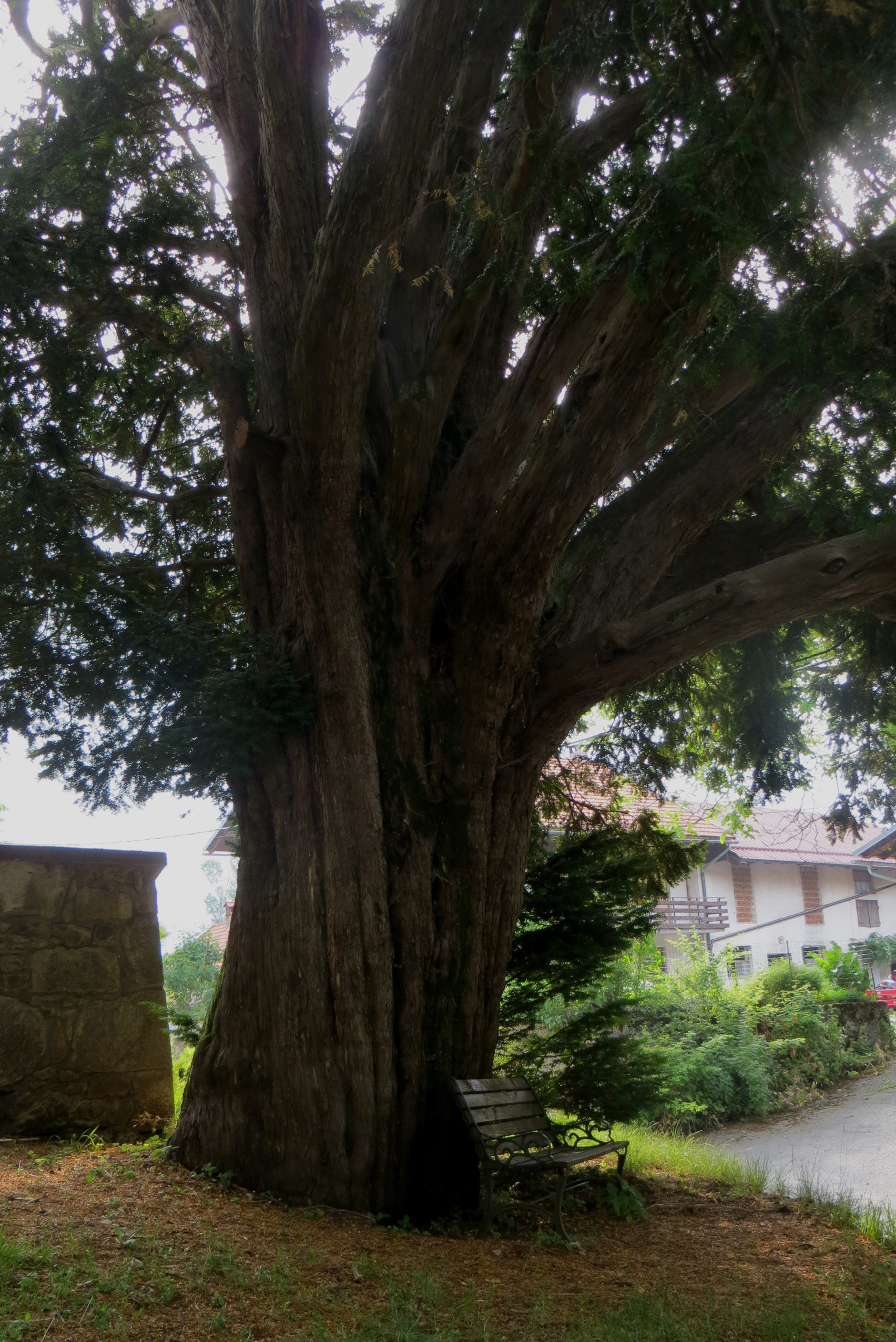
Yew in Strane

Strane has what is considered the oldest and largest yew in Slovenia. The tree is estimated to be 550 years old and it has a circumference of 420 centimeters (170 in). Karel Dežman had previously estimated the tree as 952 years old in 1860, assuming a slower rate of growth. Folk tradition claims that Saint Jerome preached under a predecessor of the current yew.

A second, younger yew stands near the older one. It has a circumference of 211 centimeters (83 in) and is estimated to be 230 years old. The younger yew is unusual in that it is monoecious, the only known example of such a yew in Slovenia.

== Church ==
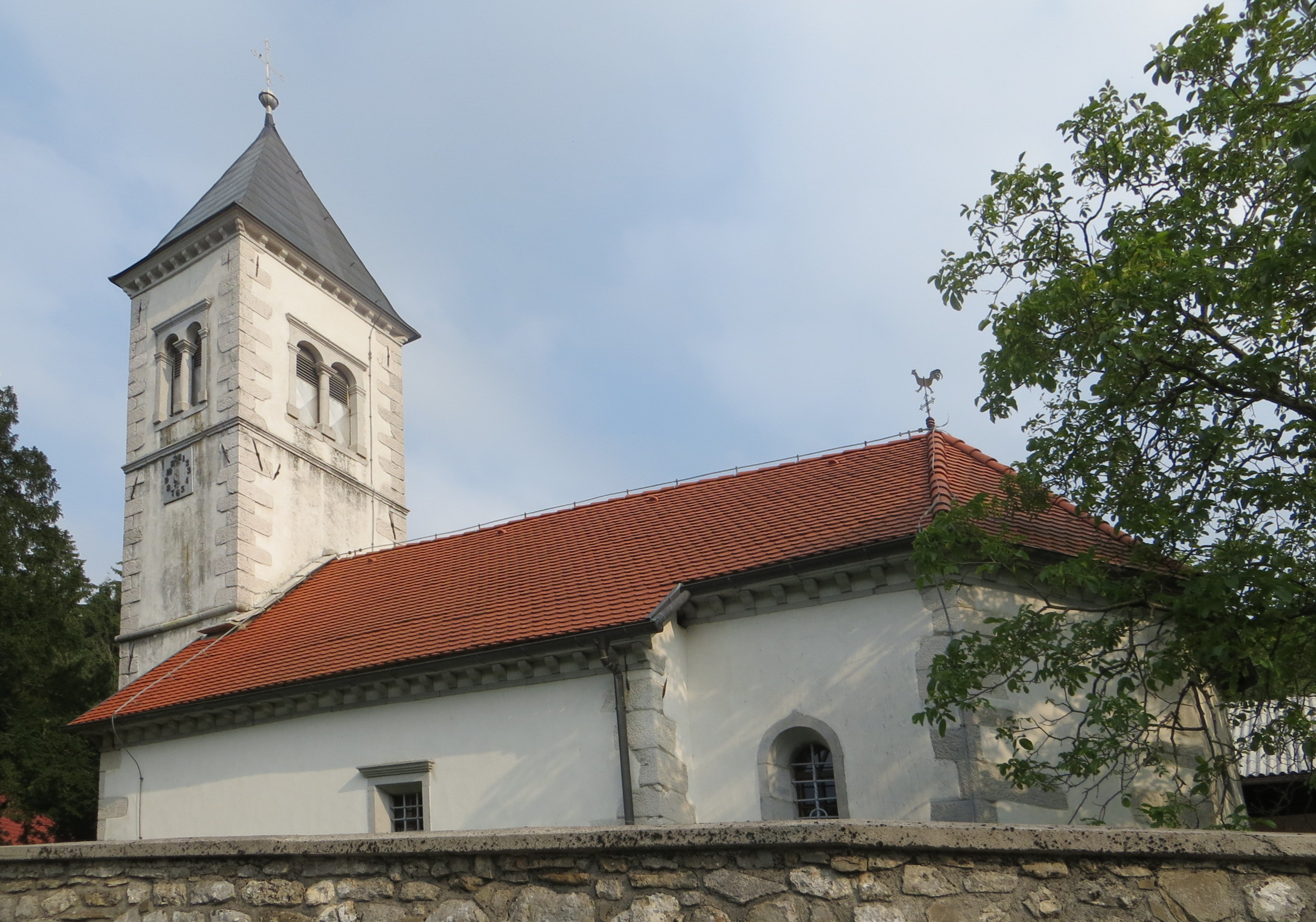
Holy Cross Church

The local church in the settlement is dedicated to the Holy Cross and belongs to the Parish of Ubeljsko.
