= Belsko =

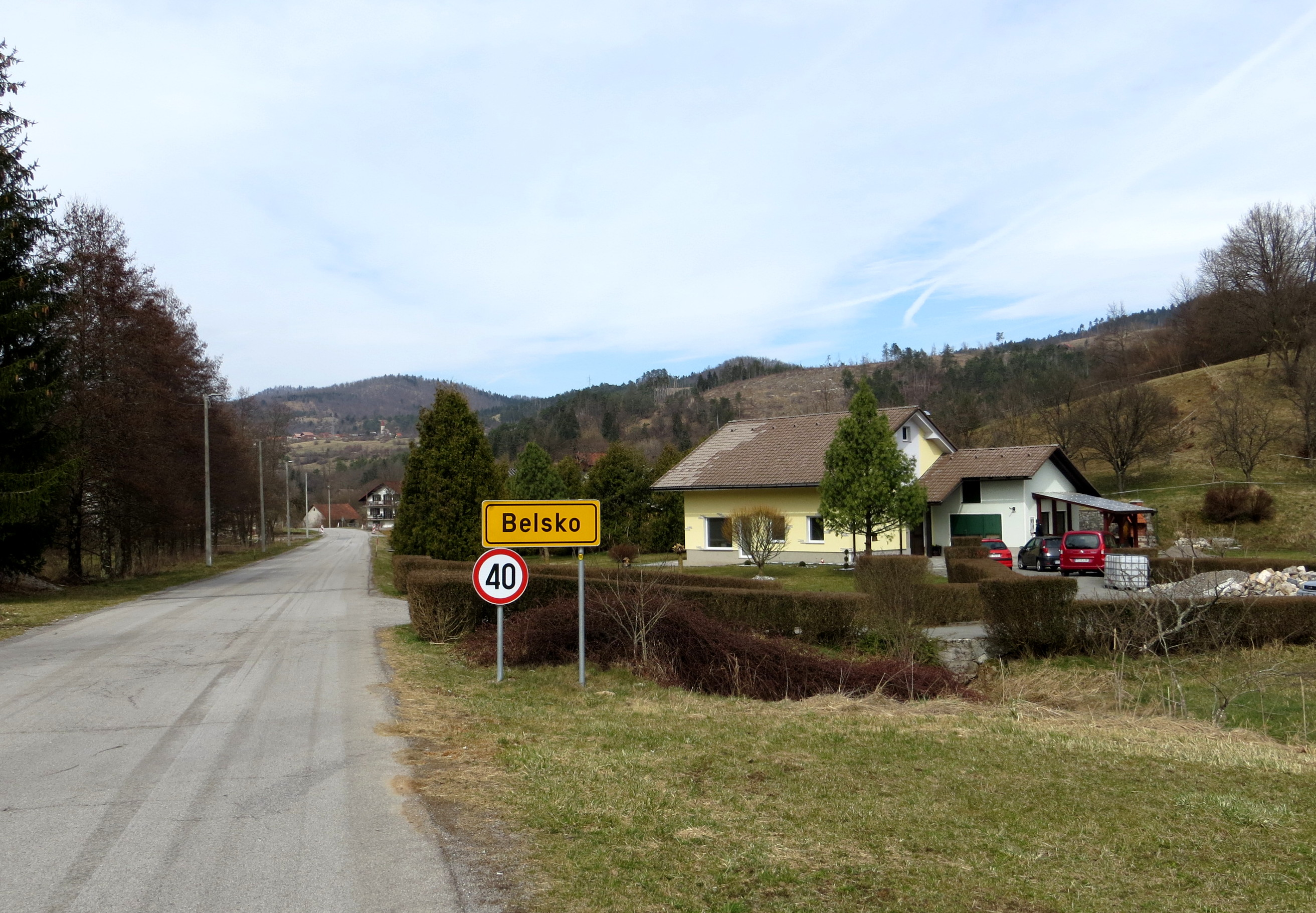

- Location in Slovenia
- Coordinates: 45°49′11.33″N 14°9′21.26″E
- Country: Slovenia
- Traditional region: Inner Carniola
- Statistical region: Littoral–Inner Carniola
- Municipality: Postojna

Area
  - Total: 2.44 km^{2} (0.94 sq mi)
- Elevation: 517.8 m (1,699 ft)

Population (2002)
  - Total: 168
- Climate: Cfb

Belsko (pronounced [ˈbeːlskɔ]) is a village northwest of Postojna in the Inner Carniola region of Slovenia.

== Church ==
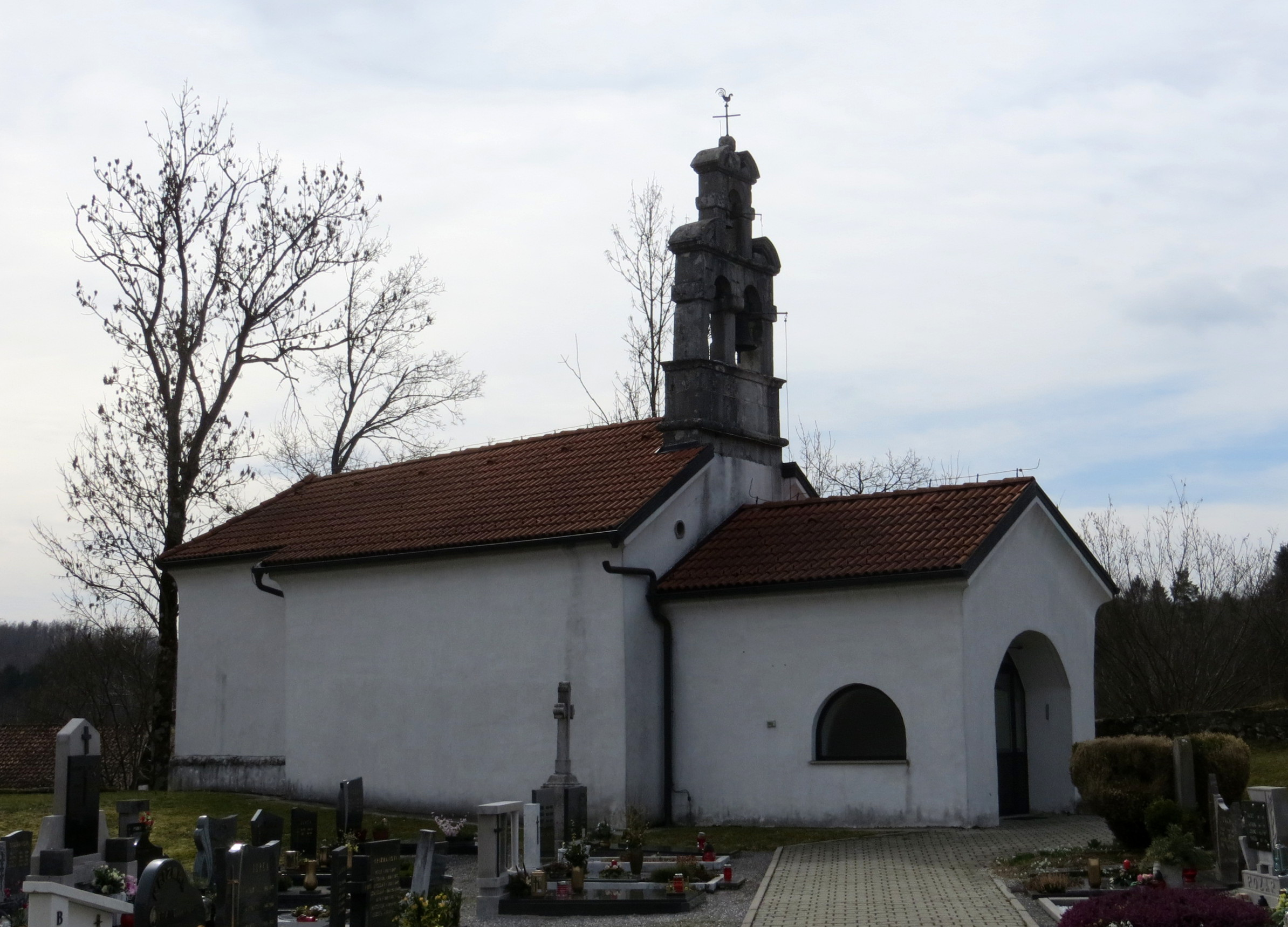
Saint Justus's Church

The local church in the settlement is dedicated to Saint Justus and belongs to the Parish of Studeno.
