= Mali Otok, Slovenia =

Mali Otok
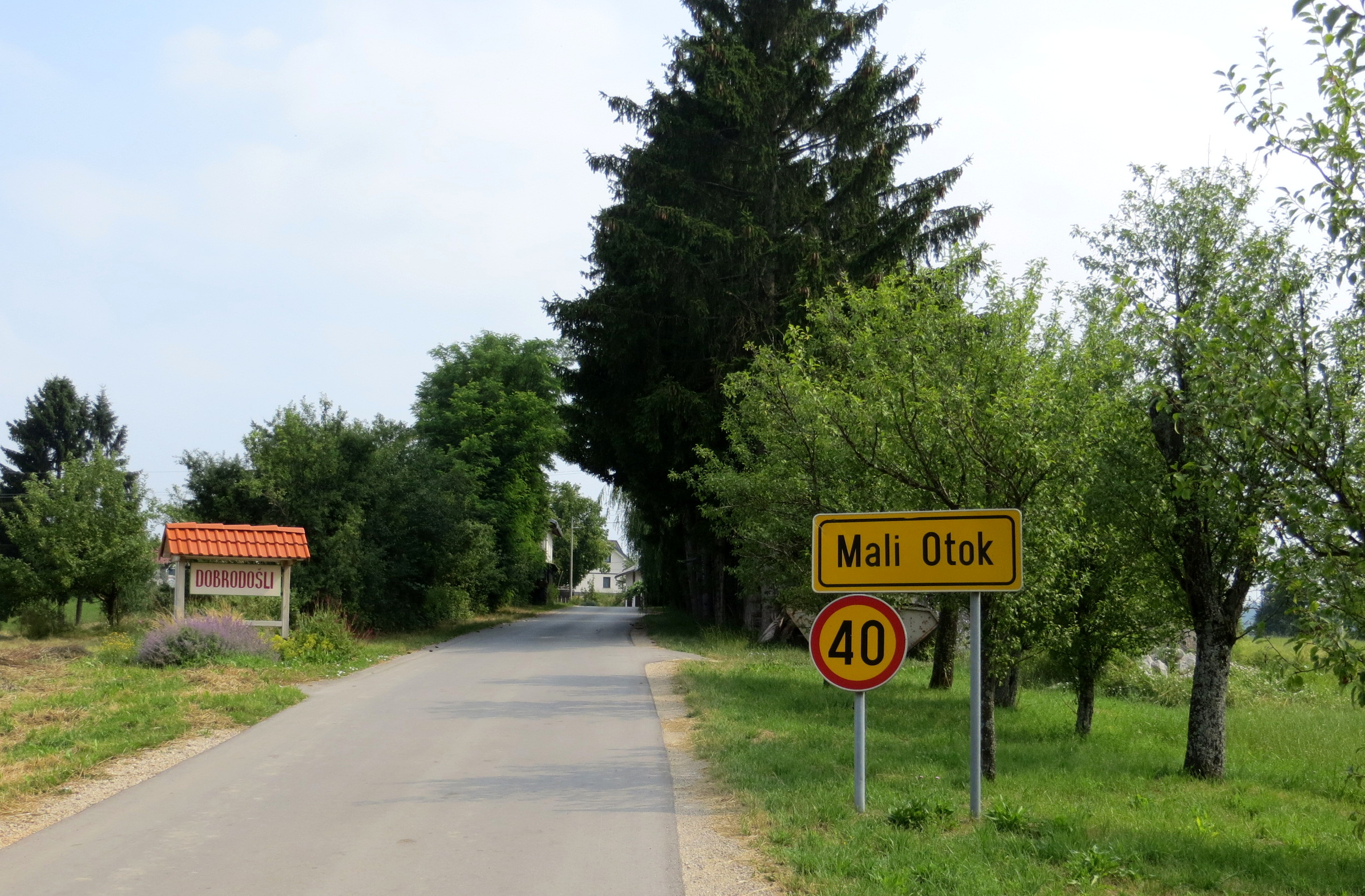

- Location in Slovenia
- Coordinates: 45°46′42.58″N 14°10′41.28″E
- Country: Slovenia
- Traditional region: Inner Carniola
- Statistical region: Littoral–Inner Carniola
- Municipality: Postojna

Area
  - Total: 2.34 km^{2} (0.90 sq mi)
- Elevation: 533.1 m (1,749 ft)

Population (2002)
  - Total: 81

Mali Otok (pronounced [ˈmaːli ˈɔːtɔk]; German: Kleinotok, Italian: Ottocco Piccolo) is a small village northwest of Postojna in the Inner Carniola region of Slovenia.

== Church ==
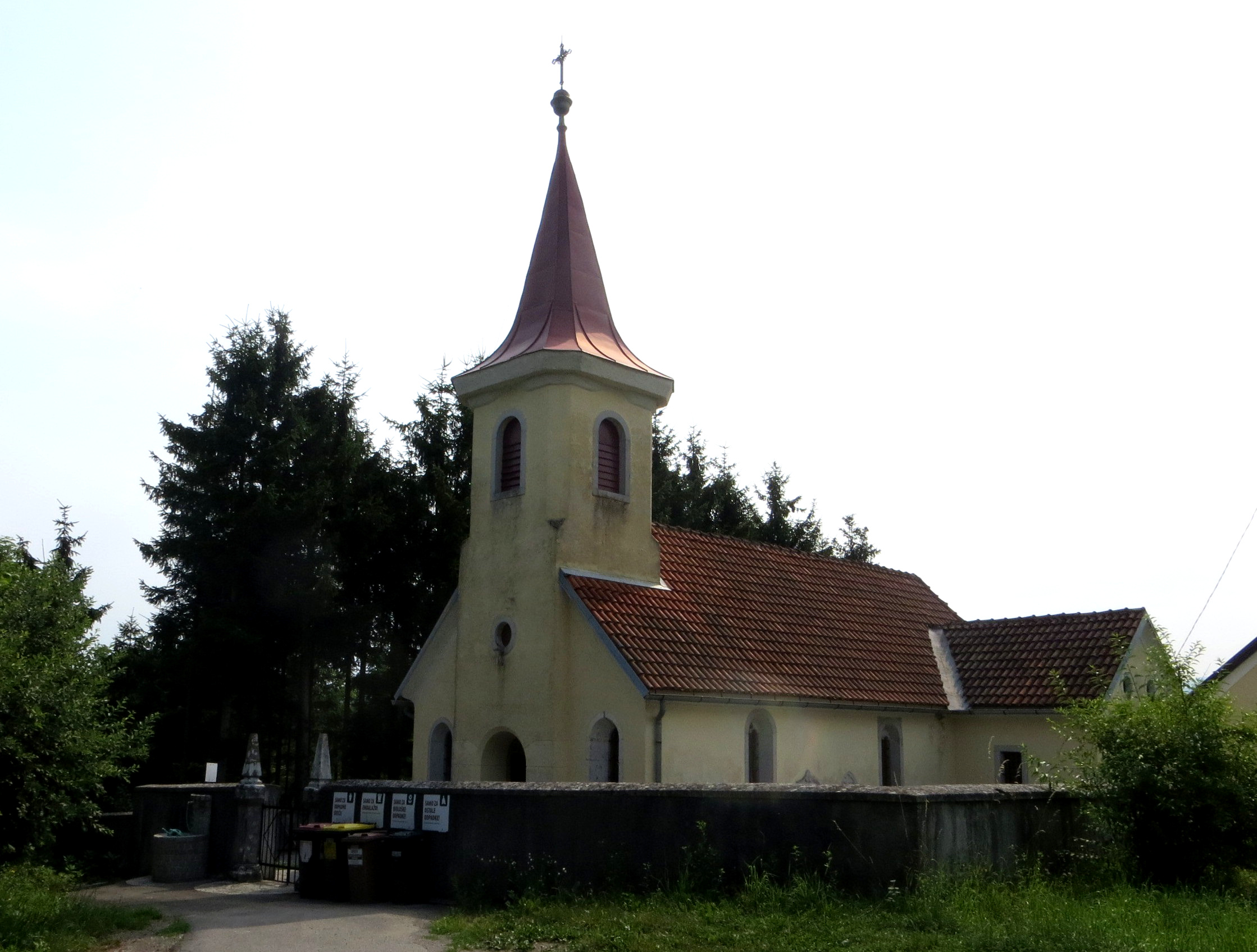
Saint Elizabeth's Church

The local church in the settlement is dedicated to Saint Elizabeth and belongs to the Parish of Postojna.
