= Sajevče =

- Location in Slovenia
- Coordinates: 45°44′40.98″N 14°6′47.1″E
- Country: Slovenia
- Traditional region: Inner Carniola
- Statistical region: Littoral–Inner Carniola
- Municipality: Postojna

Area
  - Total: 9.05 km^{2} (3.49 sq mi)
- Elevation: 579.5 m (1,901 ft)

Population (2002)
  - Total: 38

Sajevče (pronounced [ˈsaːjɛu̯tʃɛ]) is a small village in the hills south of Hruševje in the Municipality of Postojna in the Inner Carniola region of Slovenia.
