= Grobišče, Postojna =

Grobišče
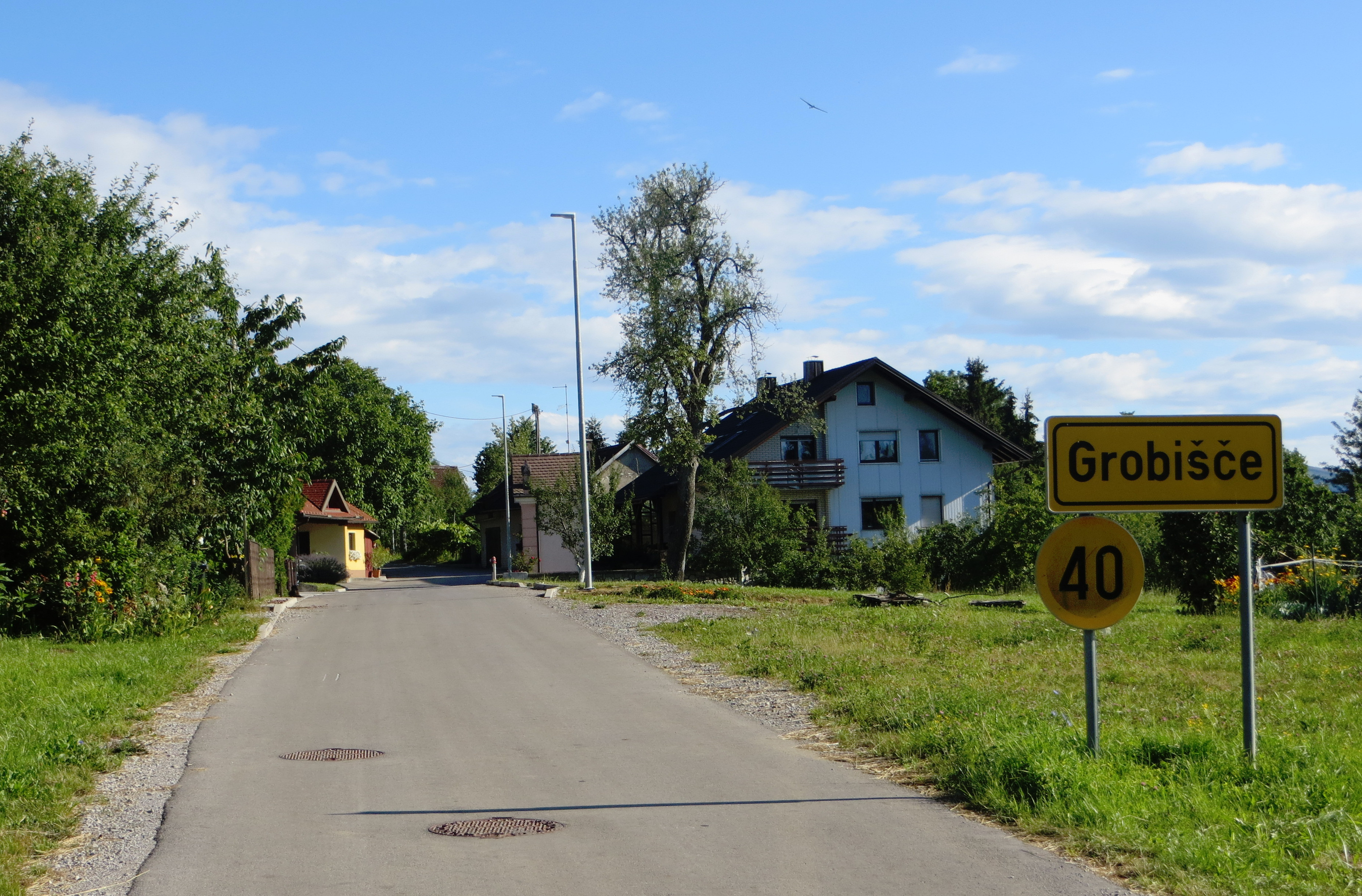

- Location in Slovenia
- Coordinates: 45°45′5.8″N 14°10′42.24″E
- Country: Slovenia
- Traditional region: Inner Carniola
- Statistical region: Littoral–Inner Carniola
- Municipality: Postojna

Area
  - Total: 2.78 km^{2} (1.07 sq mi)
- Elevation: 542.6 m (1,780 ft)

Population (2002)
  - Total: 60

Grobišče (pronounced [ˈɡɾoːbiʃtʃɛ], German: Grobsche) is a small village on the Pivka River southwest of Postojna in the Inner Carniola region of Slovenia.
