= Mala Brda =

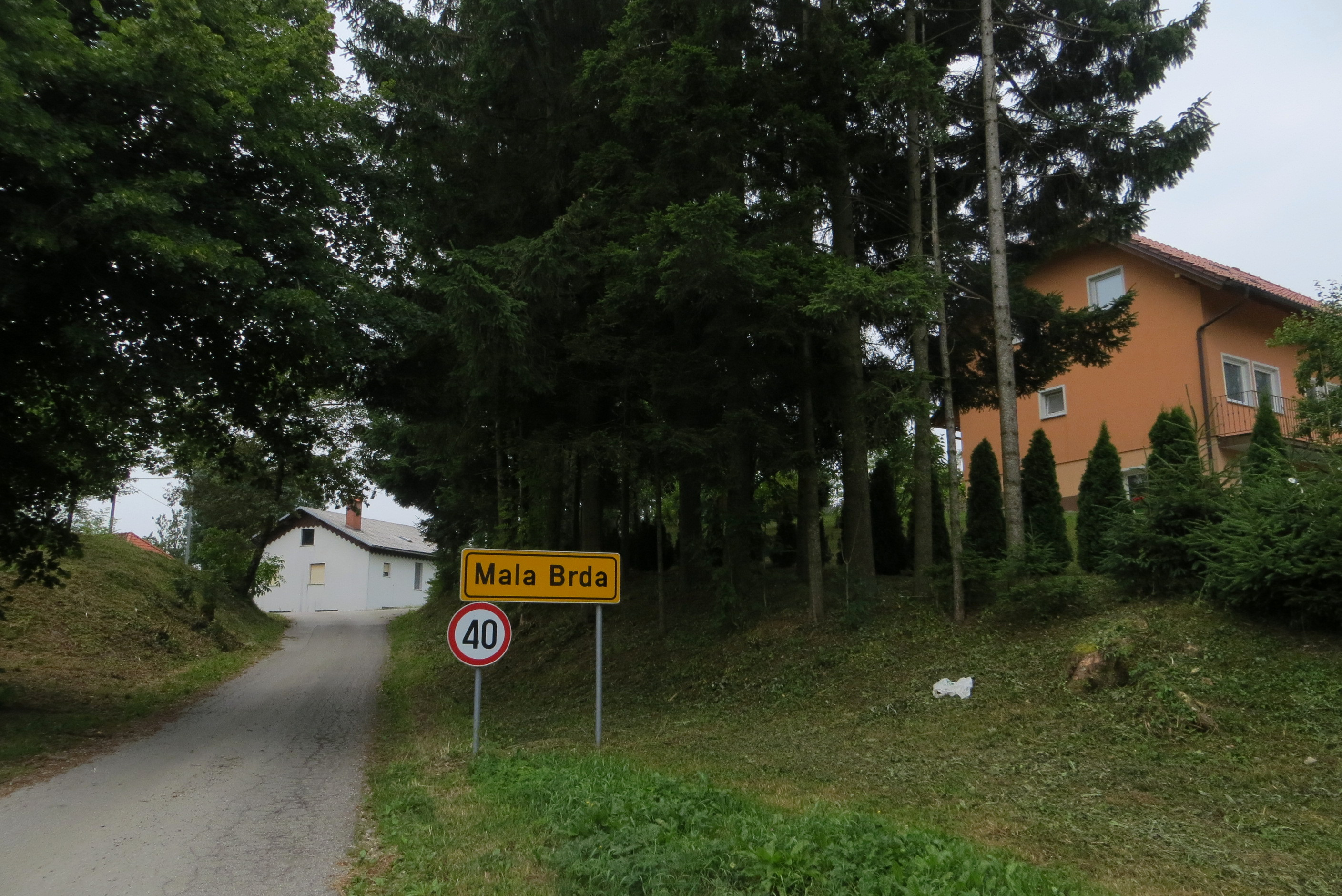

- Location in Slovenia
- Coordinates: 45°46′17.66″N 14°5′43.54″E
- Country: Slovenia
- Traditional region: Inner Carniola
- Statistical region: Littoral–Inner Carniola
- Municipality: Postojna

Area
  - Total: 1.36 km^{2} (0.53 sq mi)
- Elevation: 572.6 m (1,879 ft)

Population (2002)
  - Total: 44

Mala Brda (pronounced [ˈmaːla ˈbəɾda]) is a small settlement west of Postojna, just off the road towards Razdrto, in the Inner Carniola region of Slovenia.
