= Stara Vas, Postojna =

Stara Vas
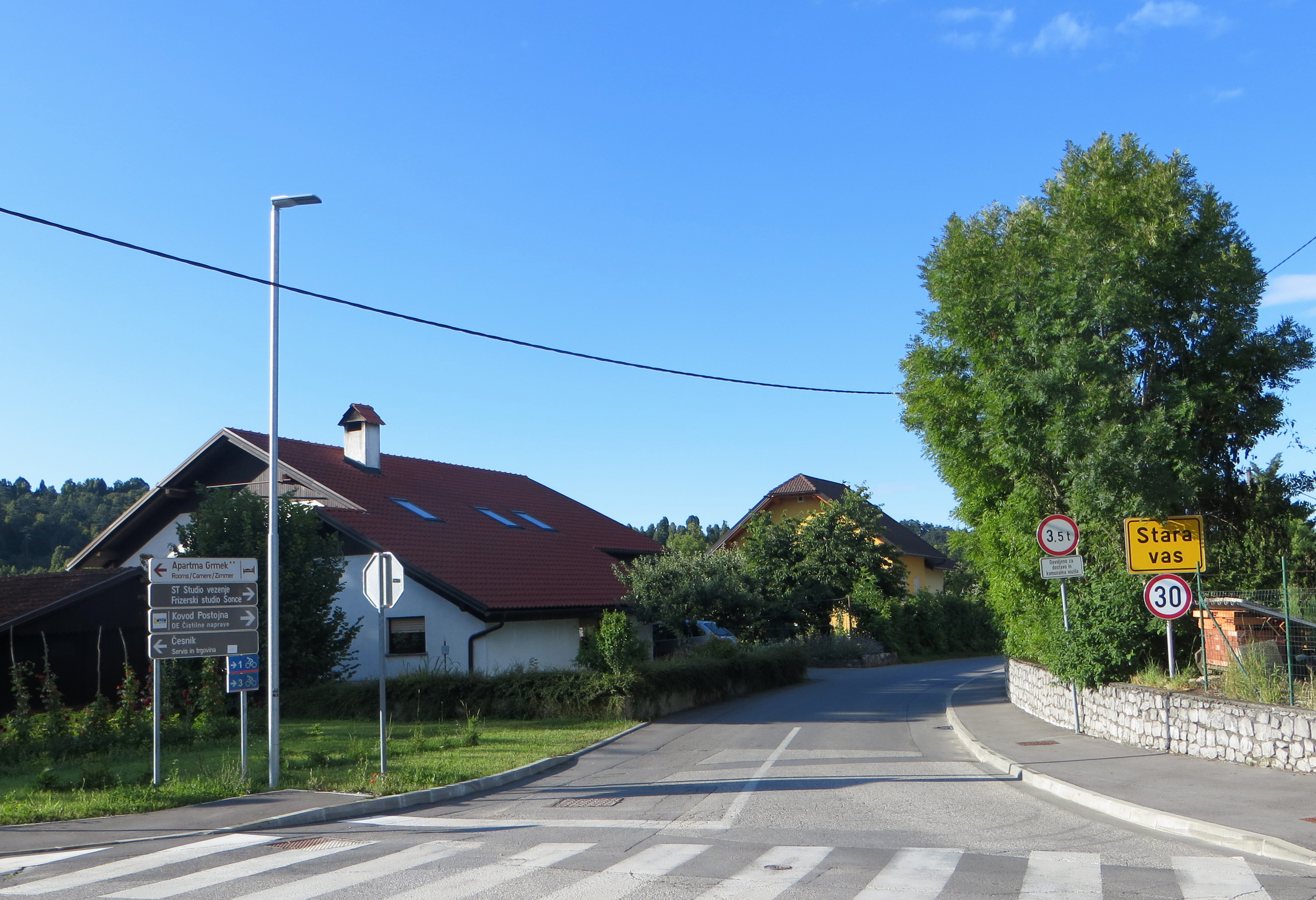

- Location in Slovenia
- Coordinates: 45°45′43.53″N 14°12′46.64″E
- Country: Slovenia
- Traditional region: Inner Carniola
- Statistical region: Littoral–Inner Carniola
- Municipality: Postojna

Area
  - Total: 1.22 km^{2} (0.47 sq mi)
- Elevation: 544.2 m (1,785 ft)

Population (2002)
  - Total: 98

Stara Vas (pronounced [ˈstaːɾa ˈʋaːs]; Slovene: Stara vas, German: Altendorf) is a small village on the southern outskirts of Postojna in the Inner Carniola region of Slovenia.

== Church ==
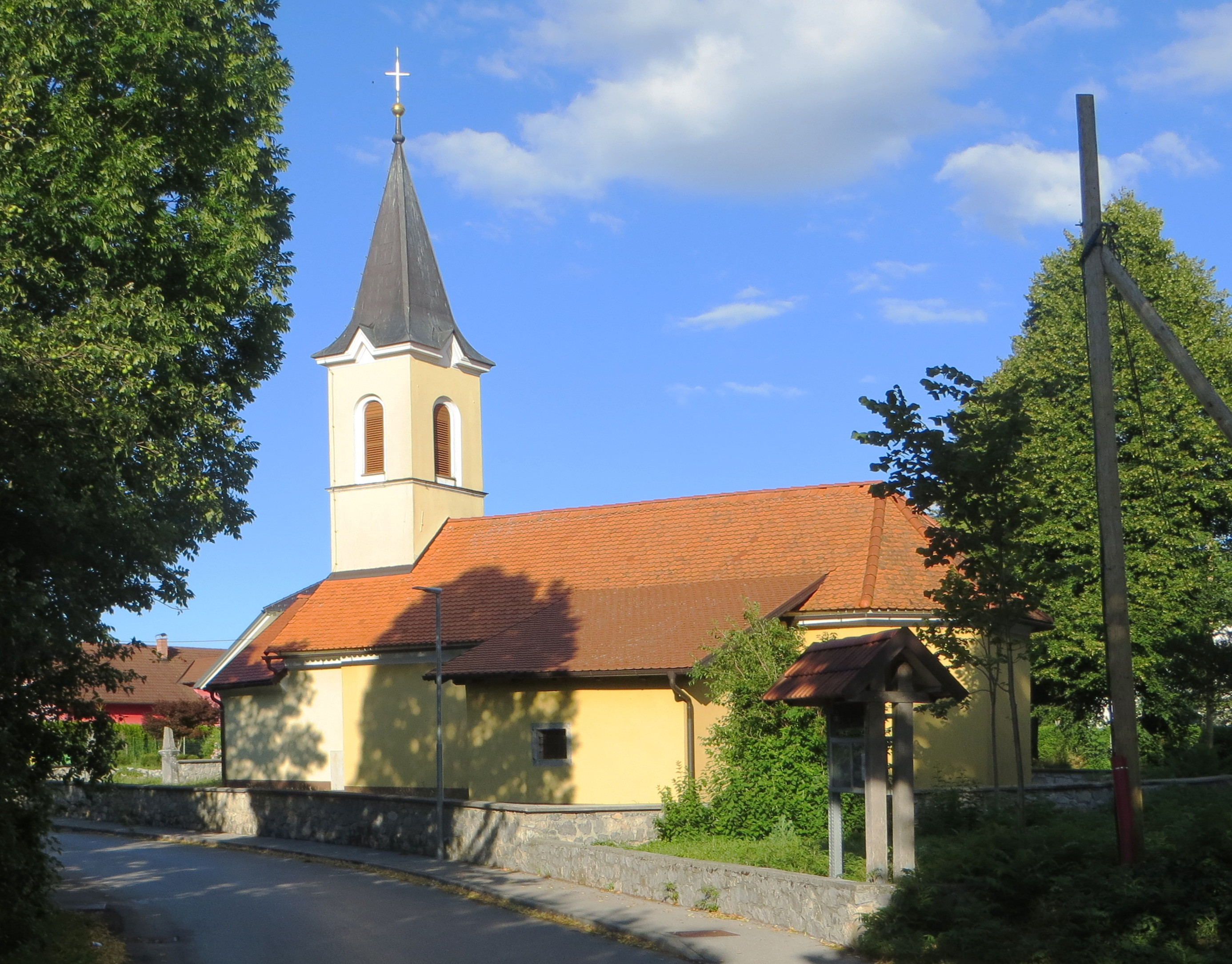
Saint Anthony of Padua Church

The local church in the settlement is dedicated to Saint Anthony of Padua and belongs to the Parish of Postojna.
