= Zagon, Postojna =

Zagon
- Location in Slovenia
- Coordinates: 45°47′38.88″N 14°10′32.12″E
- Country: Slovenia
- Traditional region: Inner Carniola
- Statistical region: Littoral–Inner Carniola
- Municipality: Postojna

Area
  - Total: 3.28 km^{2} (1.27 sq mi)
- Elevation: 548.6 m (1,800 ft)

Population (2002)
  - Total: 177

Zagon (pronounced [zaˈɡɔn], German: Sagon) is a village northwest of Postojna in the Inner Carniola region of Slovenia.

The local church in the settlement is dedicated to Saint Notburga and belongs to the Parish of Postojna.
