= Brezje pod Nanosom =

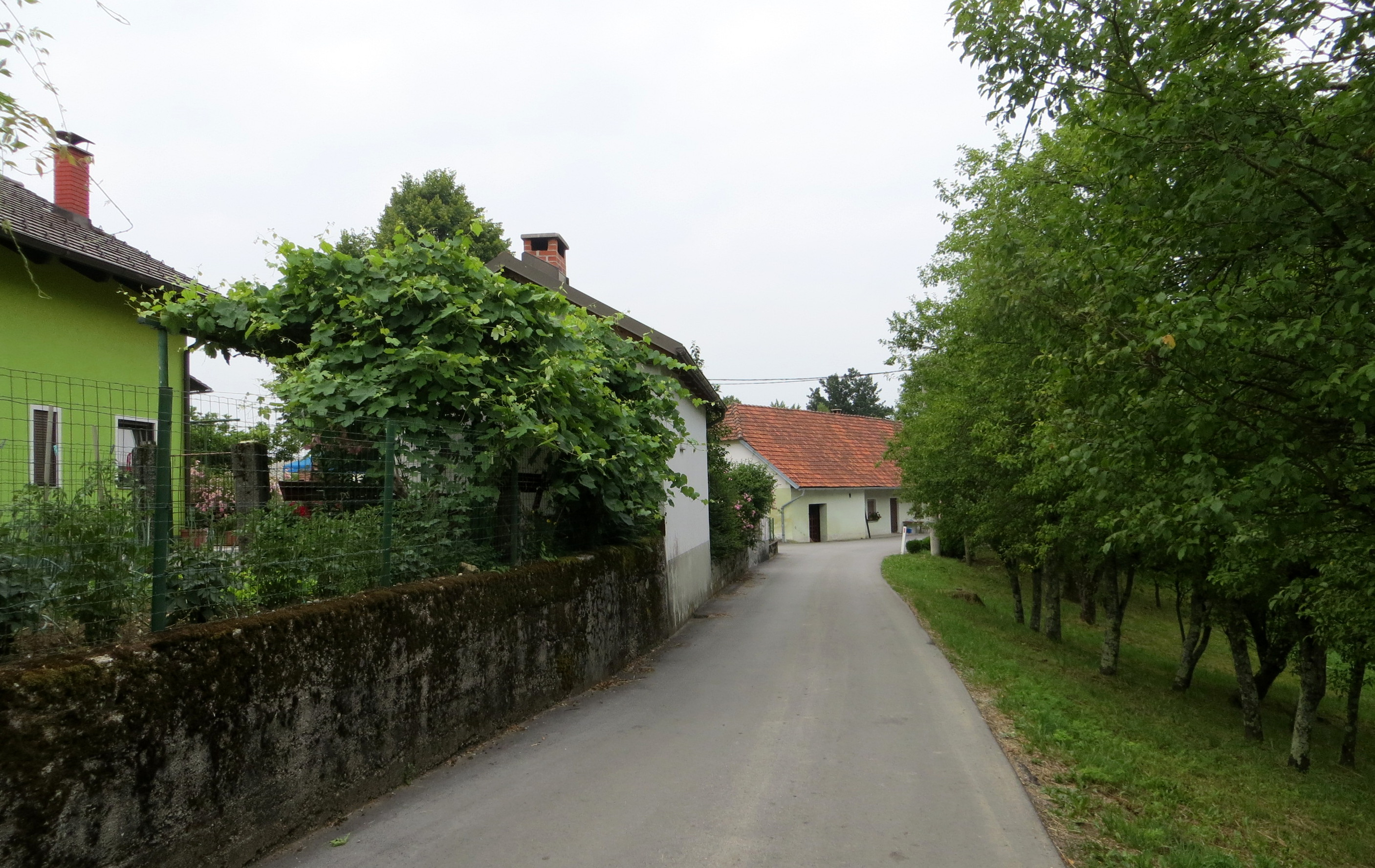

- Location in Slovenia
- Coordinates: 45°46′24.67″N 14°5′28.16″E
- Country: Slovenia
- Traditional region: Inner Carniola
- Statistical region: Littoral–Inner Carniola
- Municipality: Postojna

Area
  - Total: 0.66 km^{2} (0.25 sq mi)
- Elevation: 568.6 m (1,865 ft)

Population (2002)
  - Total: 31

Brezje pod Nanosom (pronounced [ˈbɾeːzjɛ pɔt ˈnaːnɔsɔm]; Italian: Bresie) is a small settlement below the eastern slopes of Mount Nanos in the Municipality of Postojna in the Inner Carniola region of Slovenia.

== Name ==
The name of the settlement was changed from Brezje to Brezje pod Nanosom in 1953.
