= Gorenje, Postojna =

Gorenje
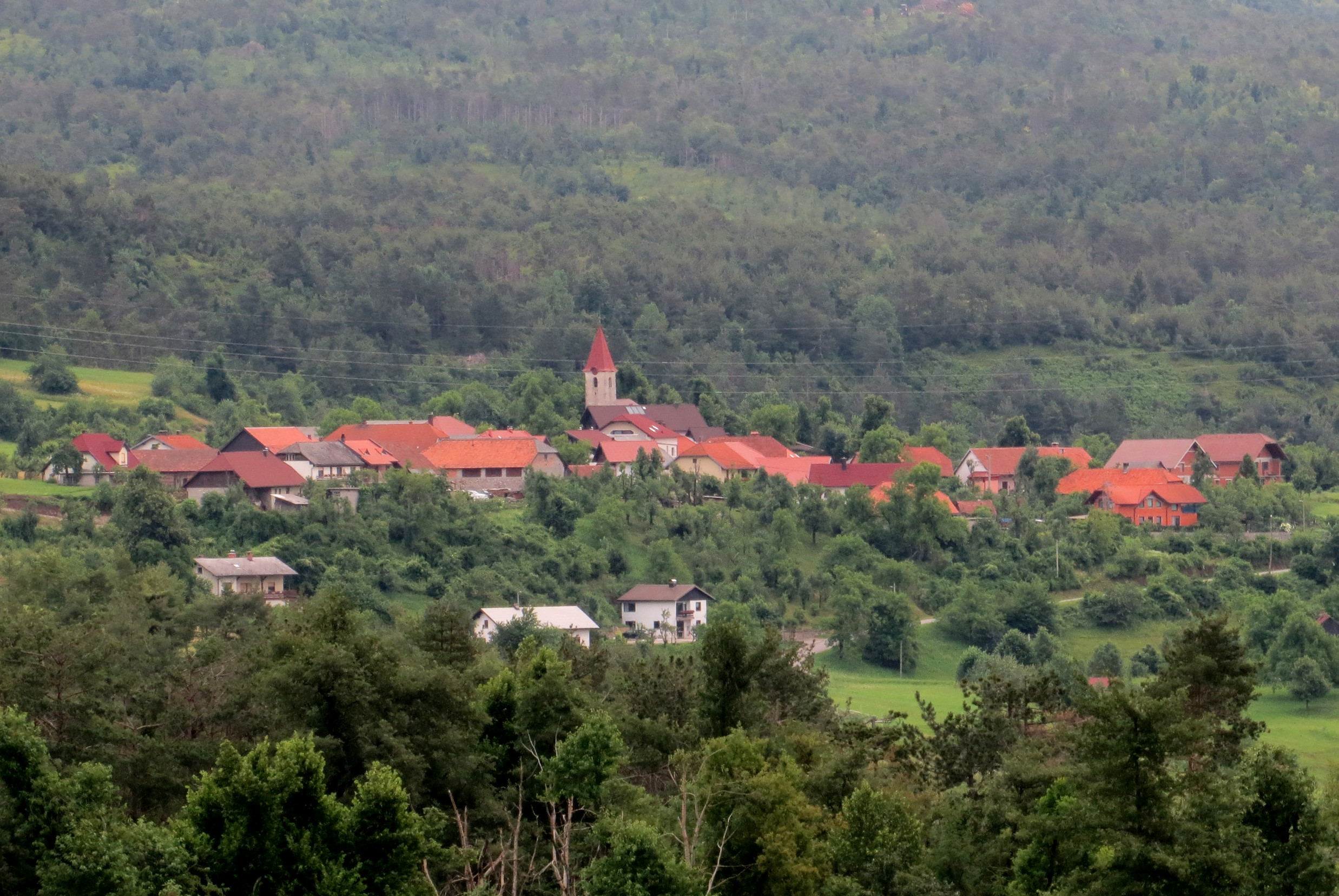

- Location in Slovenia
- Coordinates: 45°51′6.88″N 14°8′14.99″E
- Country: Slovenia
- Traditional region: Inner Carniola
- Statistical region: Littoral–Inner Carniola
- Municipality: Postojna

Area
  - Total: 21.02 km^{2} (8.12 sq mi)
- Elevation: 776.5 m (2,548 ft)

Population (2002)
  - Total: 108

Gorenje (pronounced [ɡɔˈɾeːnjɛ]; Italian: Goregna) is a village in the hills northwest of Postojna in the Inner Carniola region of Slovenia.

== Name ==
The name Gorenje is shared by several settlements in Slovenia. It arose through ellipsis of Gorenje selo (literally, 'upper village'), denoting the elevation of the place in relation to a neighboring settlement. Gorenje stands about 127 meters (417 ft) higher than Bukovje, the nearest neighboring village.

== Church ==
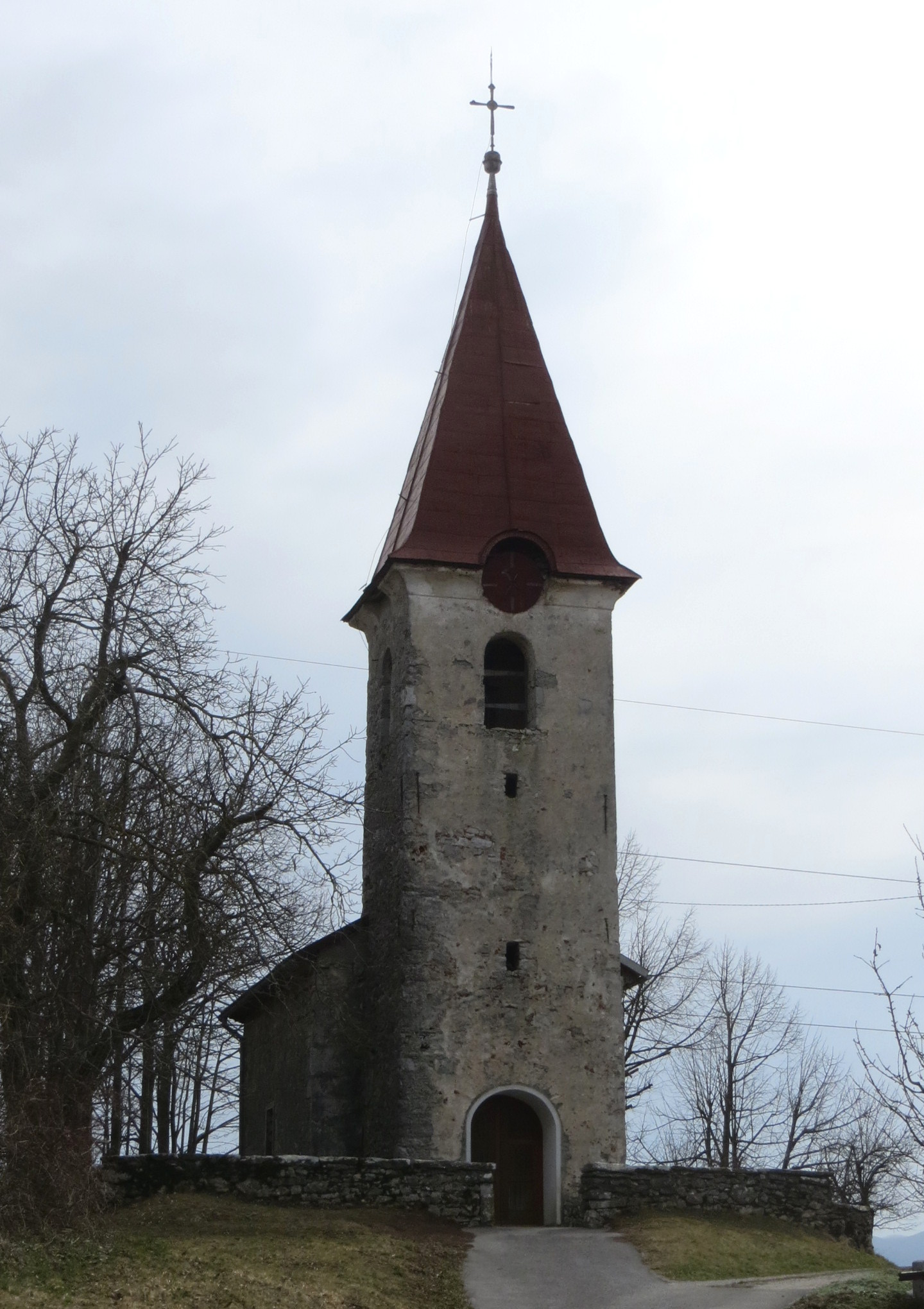
Saint Leonard's Church

The local church in the settlement is dedicated to Saint Leonard and belongs to the Parish of Studeno.
