= Municipality of Postojna =

Municipality of Slovenia

Municipality of Postojna Občina Postojna
- Municipality
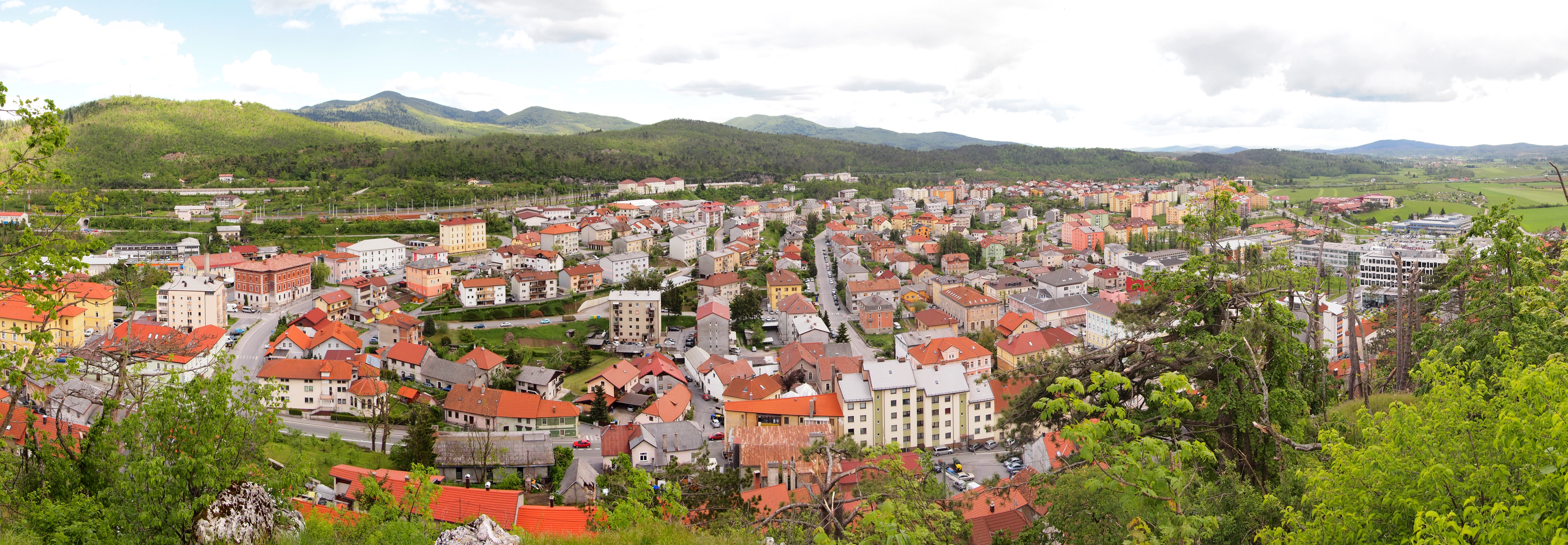

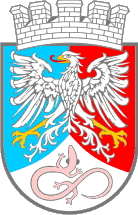
- Coat of arms

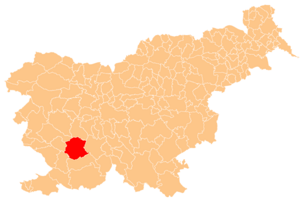
- Location of the Municipality of Postojna in Slovenia
- Coordinates: 45°47′N 14°13′E
- Country: Slovenia

Government
  - Mayor: Igor Marentič (Independent)

Area
  - Total: 269.9 km^{2} (104.2 sq mi)

Population (July 1, 2018)
  - Total: 16,120
  - Density: 59.73/km^{2} (154.7/sq mi)
- Time zone: UTC+01 (CET)
  - Summer (DST): UTC+02 (CEST)

The Municipality of Postojna (pronounced [pɔˈstoːi̯na]; Slovene: Občina Postojna) is a municipality in the traditional region of Inner Carniola in southwestern Slovenia. The seat of the municipality is the town of Postojna. The municipality was established in its current form on 3 October 1994, when the former larger Municipality of Postojna was subdivided into the municipalities of Pivka and Postojna.

== Settlements ==
In addition to the municipal seat of Postojna, the municipality also includes the following settlements:

- Belsko
- Brezje pod Nanosom
- Bukovje
- Dilce
- Gorenje
- Goriče
- Grobišče
- Hrašče
- Hrenovice
- Hruševje
- Koče
- Landol
- Liplje
- Lohača
- Mala Brda
- Mali Otok
- Malo Ubeljsko
- Matenja Vas
- Orehek
- Planina
- Predjama
- Prestranek
- Rakitnik
- Rakulik
- Razdrto
- Sajevče
- Slavina
- Slavinje
- Šmihel pod Nanosom
- Stara Vas
- Strane
- Strmca
- Studenec
- Studeno
- Velika Brda
- Veliki Otok
- Veliko Ubeljsko
- Zagon
- Žeje

== Attractions ==
The entire municipality has a typical karst landscape. One of Slovenia's major tourist attractions, Postojna Cave, is located in the municipality. A second popular tourist attraction, located approximately 9 kilometers (5.6 mi) from Postojna, is Predjama Castle, a 16th-century castle built in the mouth of another karst cave.
