= Slavinje =

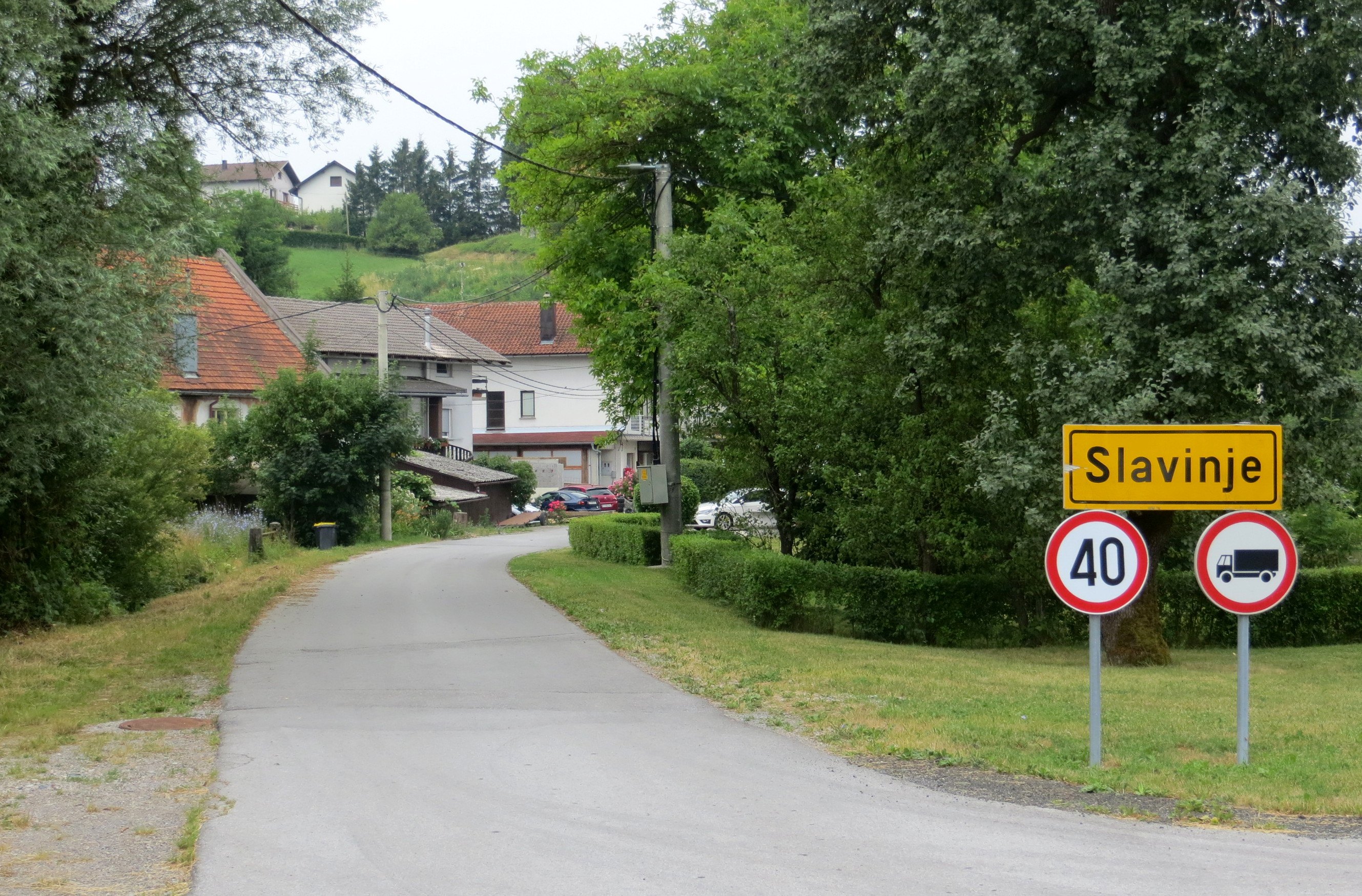

- Location in Slovenia
- Coordinates: 45°45′35.21″N 14°6′22.64″E
- Country: Slovenia
- Traditional region: Inner Carniola
- Statistical region: Littoral–Inner Carniola
- Municipality: Postojna

Area
  - Total: 2.13 km^{2} (0.82 sq mi)
- Elevation: 561.7 m (1,843 ft)

Population (2002)
  - Total: 64

Slavinje (pronounced [ˈslaːʋinjɛ]; Italian: Slavigne) is a village on the road between Hruševje and Razdrto in the Municipality of Postojna in the Inner Carniola region of Slovenia.

== Geography ==
The newer part of Slavinje lies along the main road, and the older part of the village stands on a rise immediately south of the road. Before water mains were installed in the village, water was obtained from wells and cisterns, and from nearby Hornbeam Spring (Pod gabrom). A spring in the lower part of the village has been impounded for use as a water source for livestock. There is a karst spring in a meadow in the woods south of the village.

== Name ==
The name Slavinje, like the related place name Slavina, is derived from the nickname Slavo or *Slavъ, found as a second element in various names (e.g., *Dobroslavъ, *Pribyslavъ, etc.). The name therefore originally means 'Slavo's village', referring to an early inhabitant.

== History ==
During the Second World War, the Partisans had a bunker in the area, in the woods about 500 meters (1,600 ft) south of the village. After the war, agricultural land in the village was consolidated into the Hruševje unit of the Postojna collective farm (KZ Postojna).

== Church ==
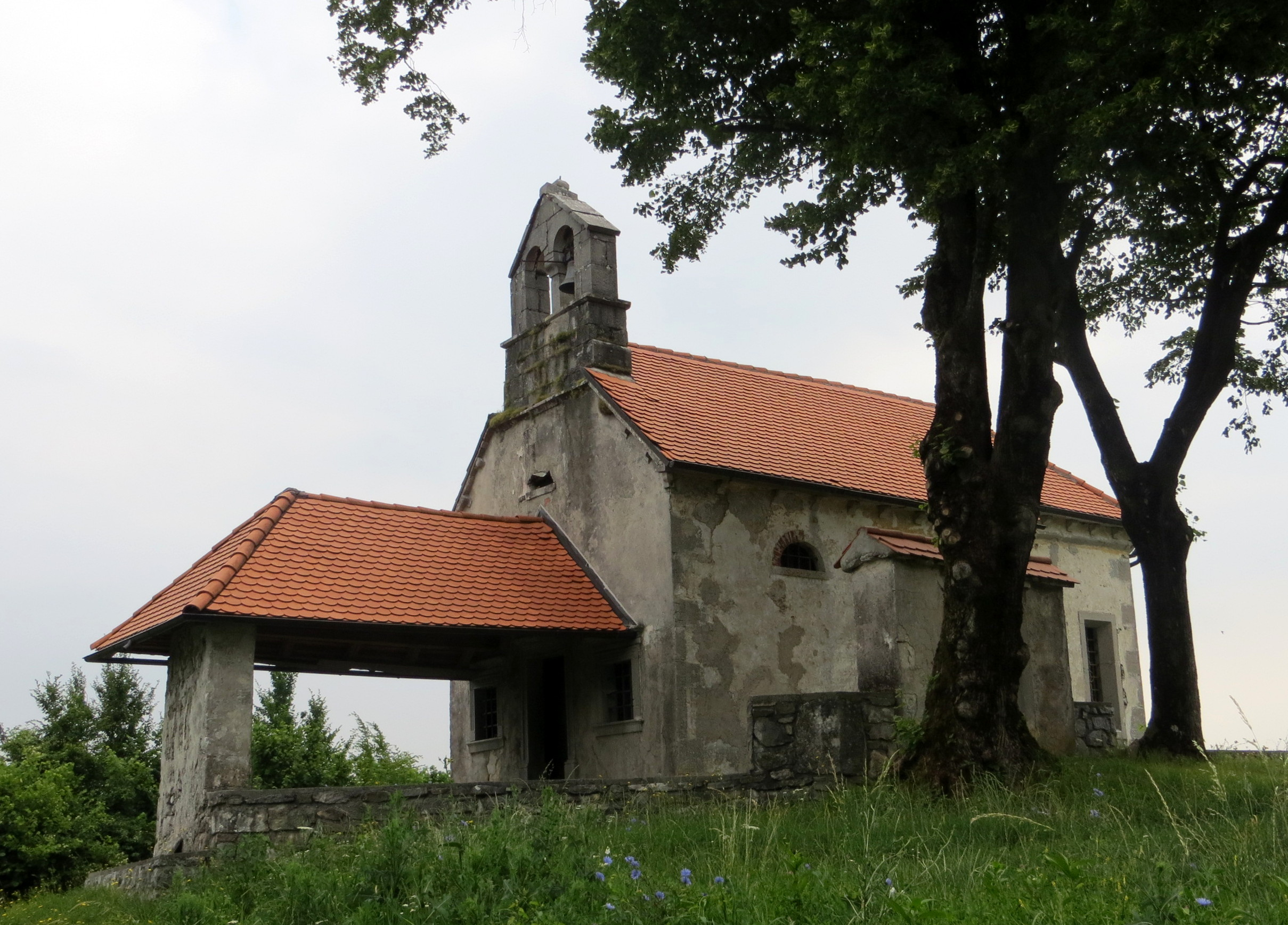
View from southwest

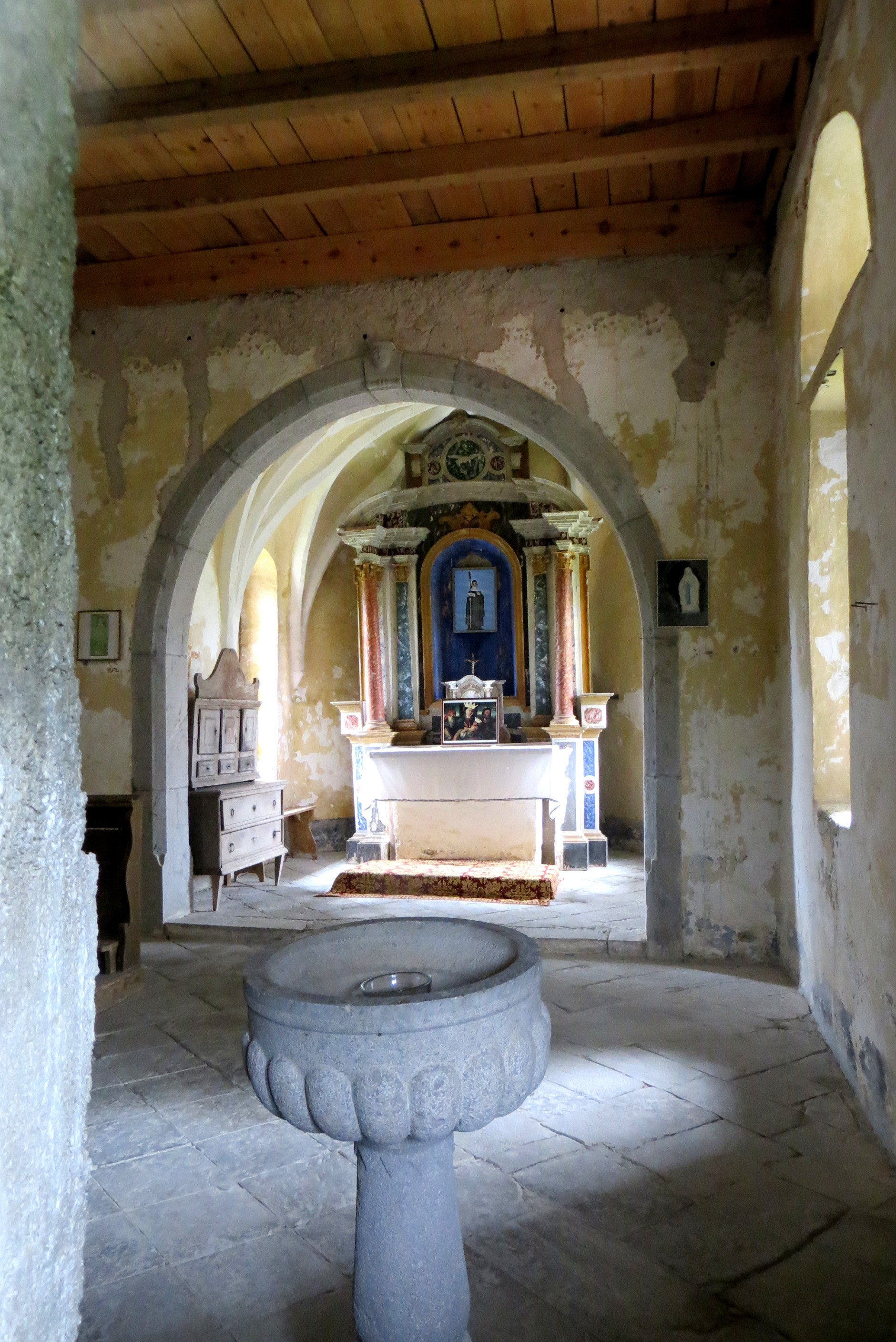
Interior

Saint Gertrude's Church

The local church in the settlement is dedicated to Saint Gertrude and belongs to the Parish of Hrenovice. The church is an originally medieval Gothic structure that was reworked in the Baroque style in 1638, as indicated by the year carved above the entrance. The rectangular nave terminates in a slightly narrower chancel walled on three sides. The church has a bell gable above an open narthex.
