= Goriče, Postojna =

Goriče
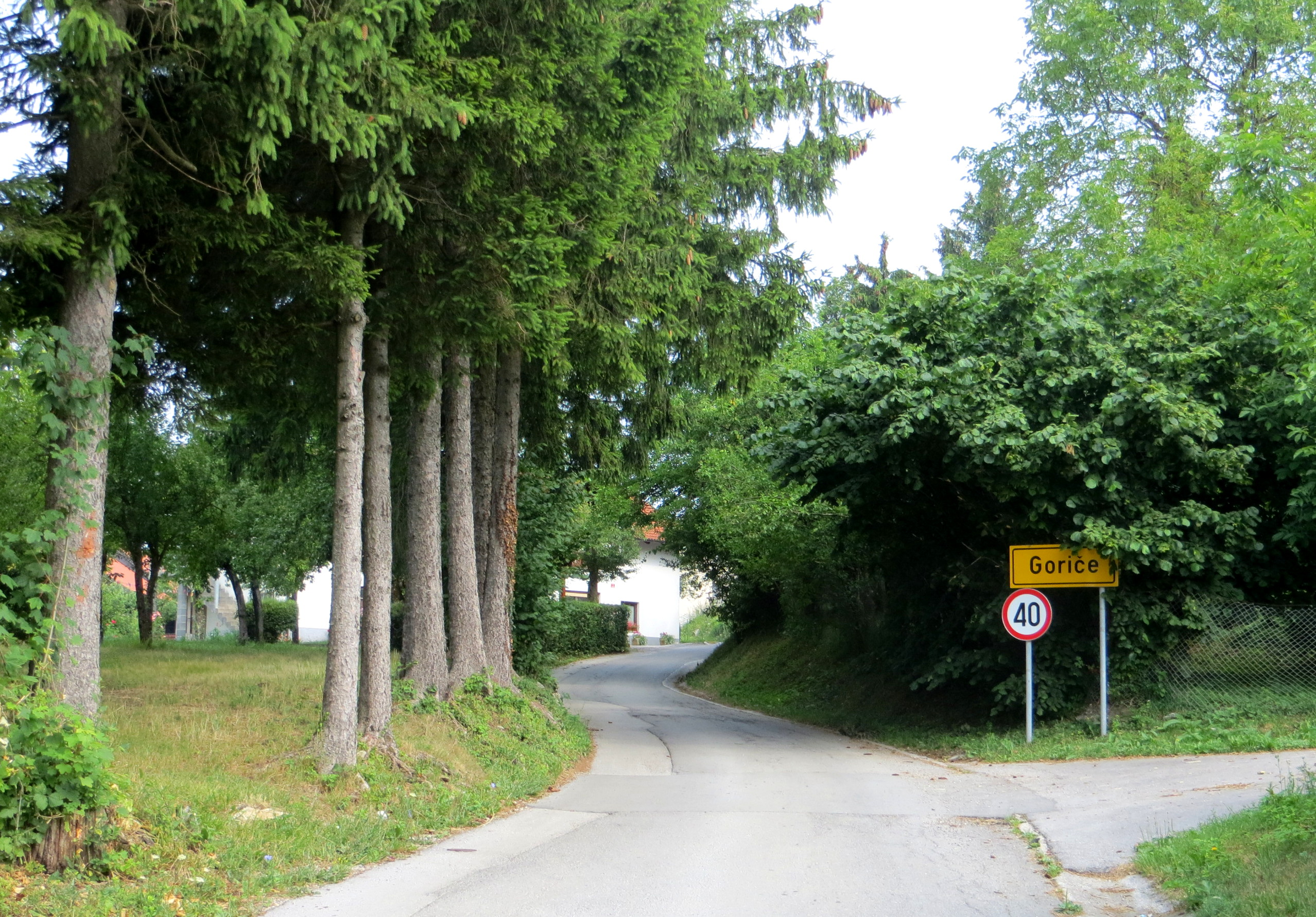

- Location in Slovenia
- Coordinates: 45°46′24.49″N 14°7′52.12″E
- Country: Slovenia
- Traditional region: Inner Carniola
- Statistical region: Littoral–Inner Carniola
- Municipality: Postojna

Area
  - Total: 1.3 km^{2} (0.50 sq mi)
- Elevation: 551.2 m (1,808 ft)

Population (2002)
  - Total: 73

Goriče (pronounced [ɡɔˈɾiːtʃɛ]; Italian: Goricce) is a village west of Postojna in the Inner Carniola region of Slovenia.

== Church ==
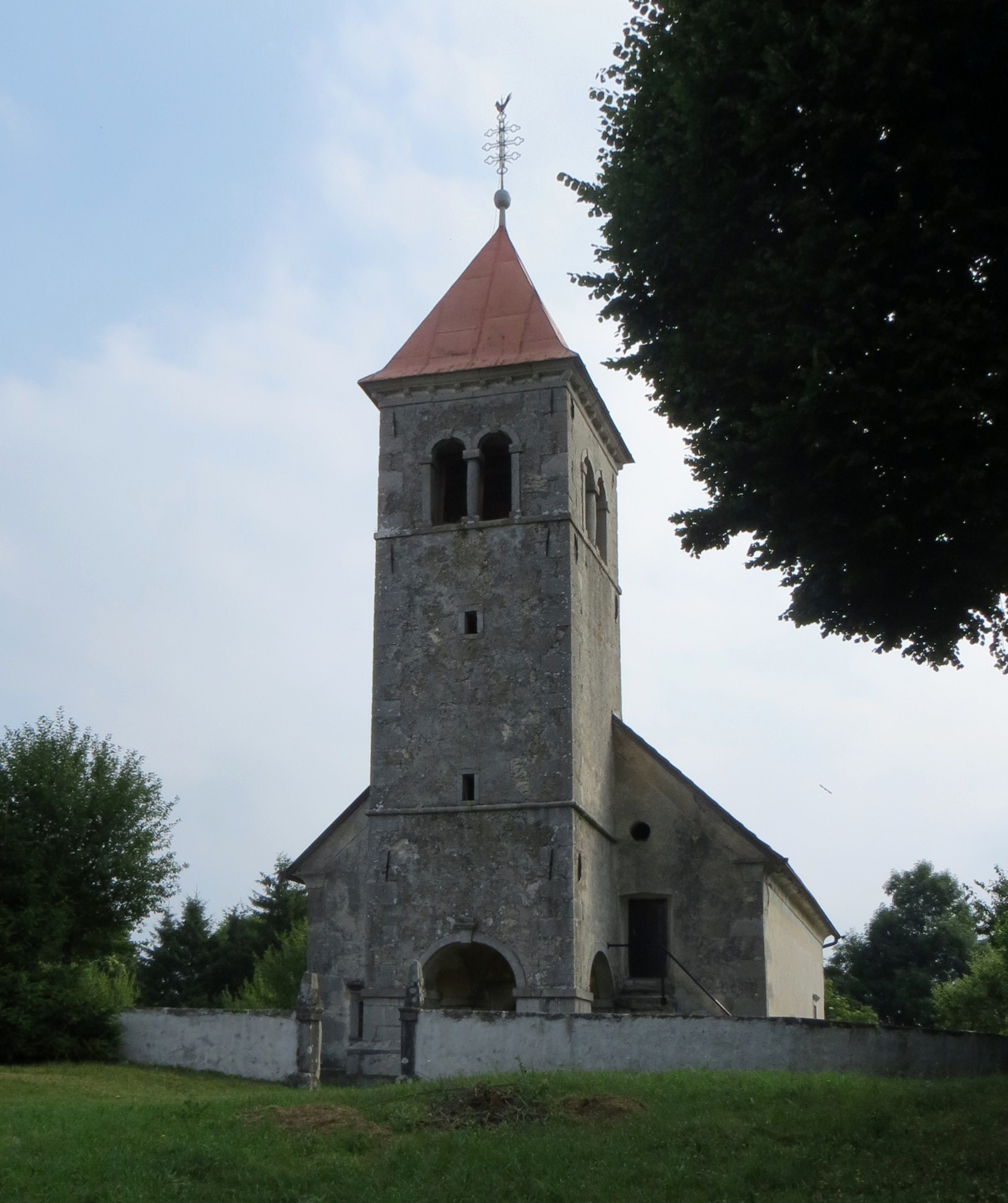
Saint Peter's Church

The local church in the settlement is dedicated to Saint Peter and belongs to the Parish of Hrenovice.
