= Slavina, Postojna =

Slavina
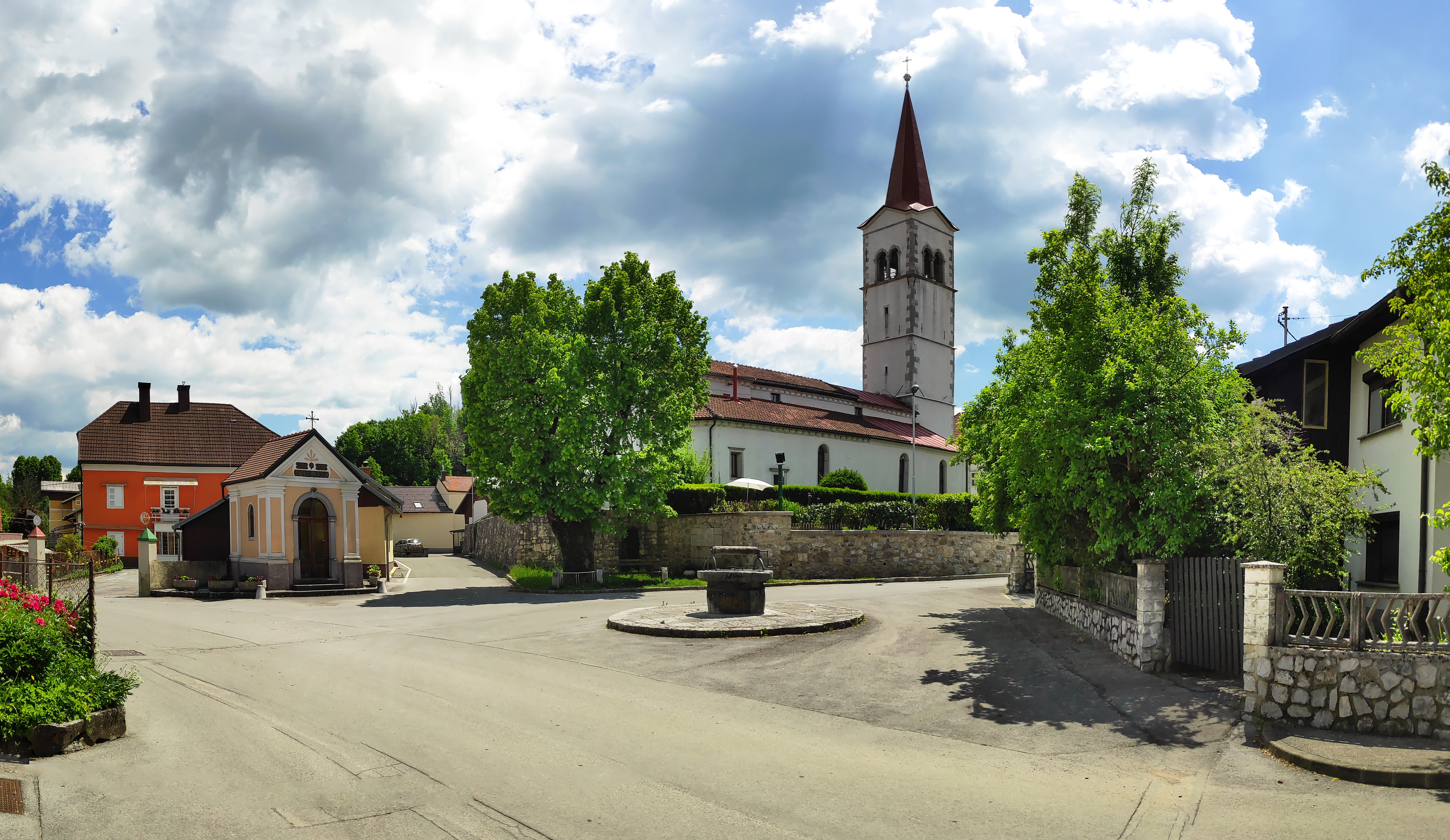

- Location in Slovenia
- Coordinates: 45°42′43.18″N 14°10′39.23″E
- Country: Slovenia
- Traditional region: Inner Carniola
- Statistical region: Littoral–Inner Carniola
- Municipality: Postojna

Area
  - Total: 6.89 km^{2} (2.66 sq mi)
- Elevation: 542 m (1,778 ft)

Population (2002)
  - Total: 206

Slavina (pronounced [ˈslaːʋina]; German: Slawina, Italian: Villa Slavina) is a village south of Postojna on the way to Pivka in the Inner Carniola region of Slovenia.

The parish church in the settlement is dedicated to the Assumption of Mary and belongs to the Koper Diocese.
