= Matenja Vas =

- Village
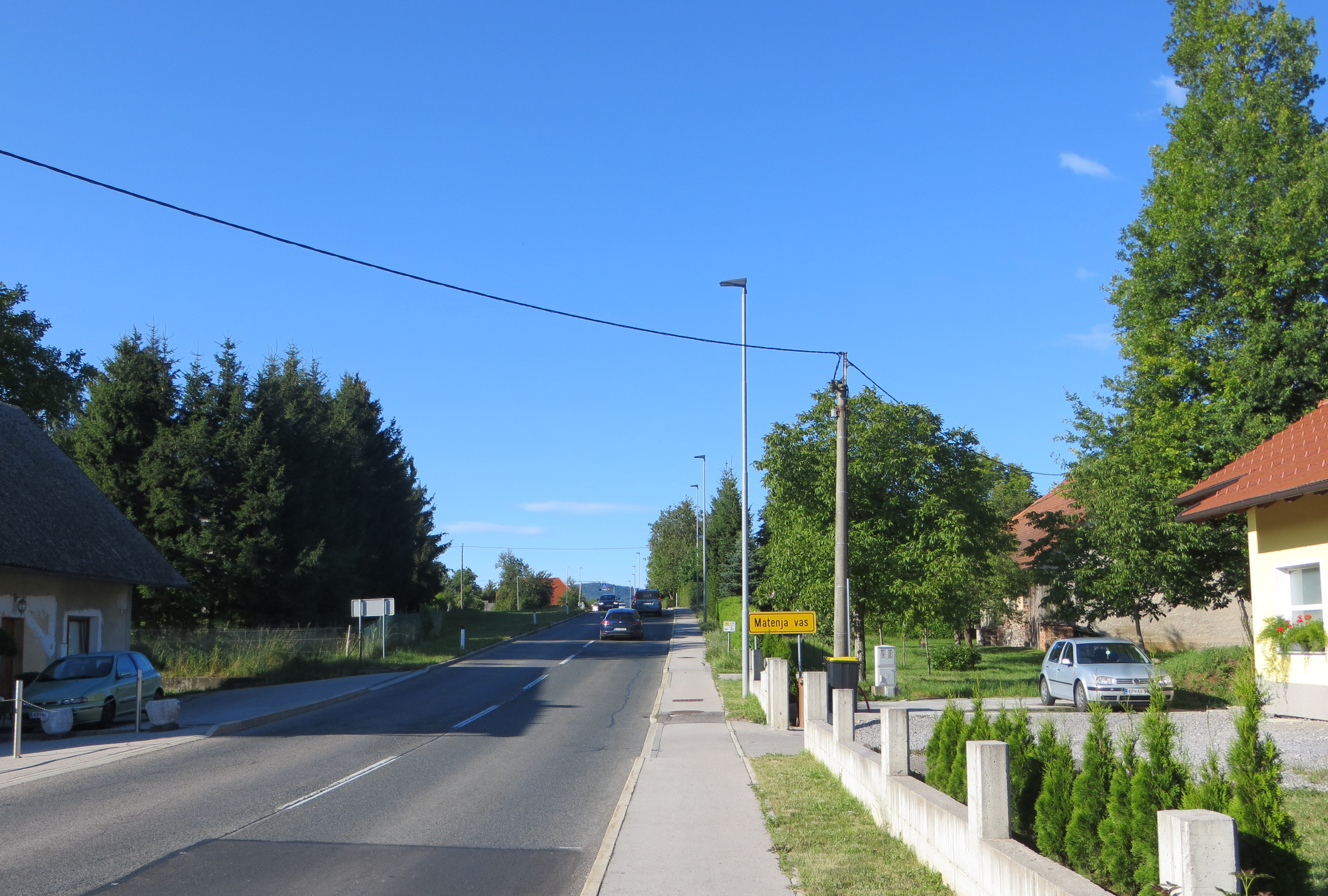

- Location in Slovenia
- Coordinates: 45°44′29.49″N 14°11′38.19″E
- Country: Slovenia
- Traditional region: Inner Carniola
- Statistical region: Littoral–Inner Carniola
- Municipality: Postojna

Area
  - Total: 2.05 km^{2} (0.79 sq mi)
- Elevation: 529.3 m (1,737 ft)

Population (2002)
  - Total: 329

Matenja Vas (pronounced [maˈteːnja ˈʋaːs]; Slovene: Matenja vas, German: Mautersdorf, Italian: Mategna) is a village south of Postojna in the Inner Carniola region of Slovenia.

== Church ==
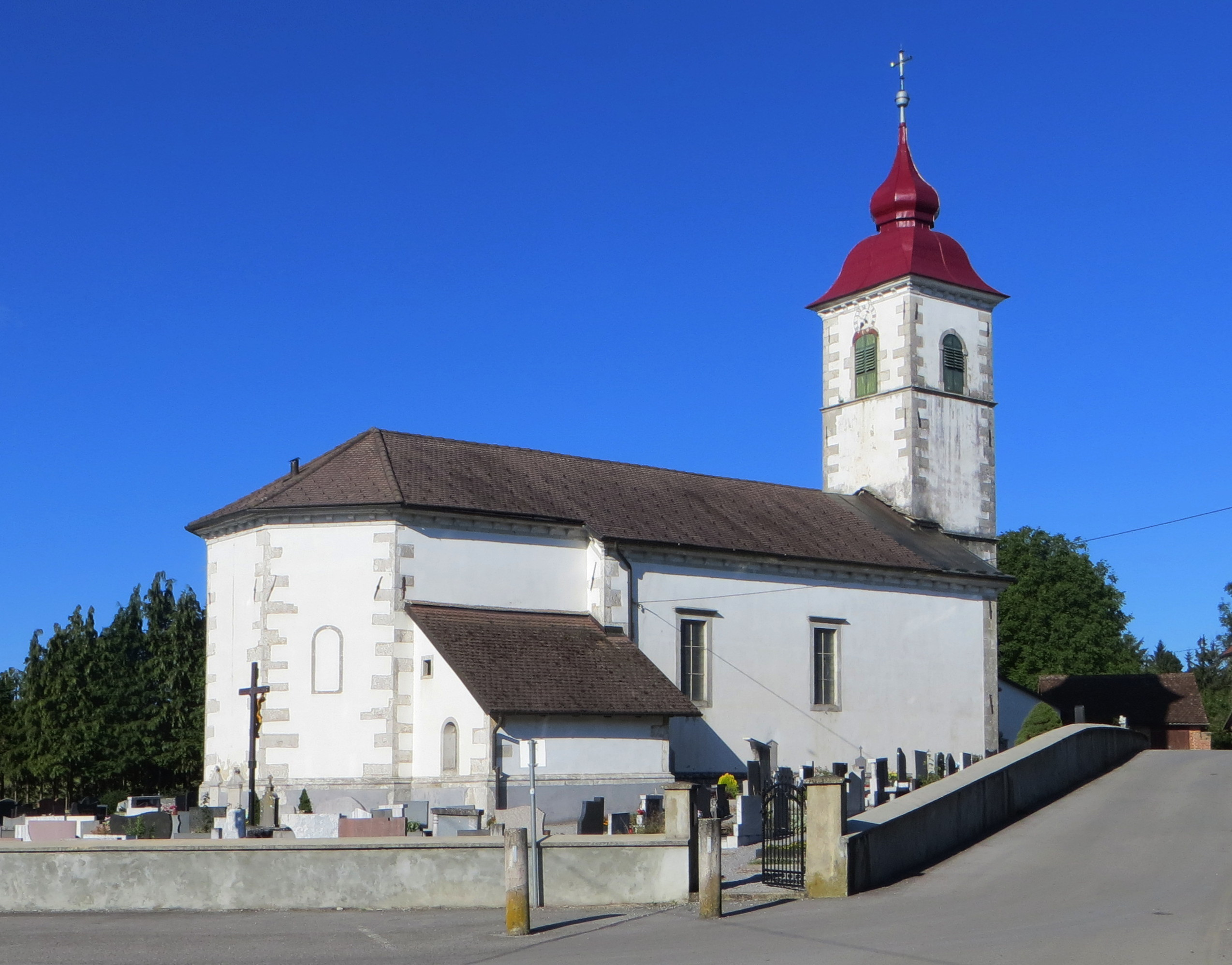
Saint John the Baptist Church

The parish church in the settlement is dedicated to John the Baptist and belongs to the Koper Diocese. It was built in the mid-17th century on the site of an older chapel.
