= Strmca, Postojna =

Strmca Strmica (until 1994)
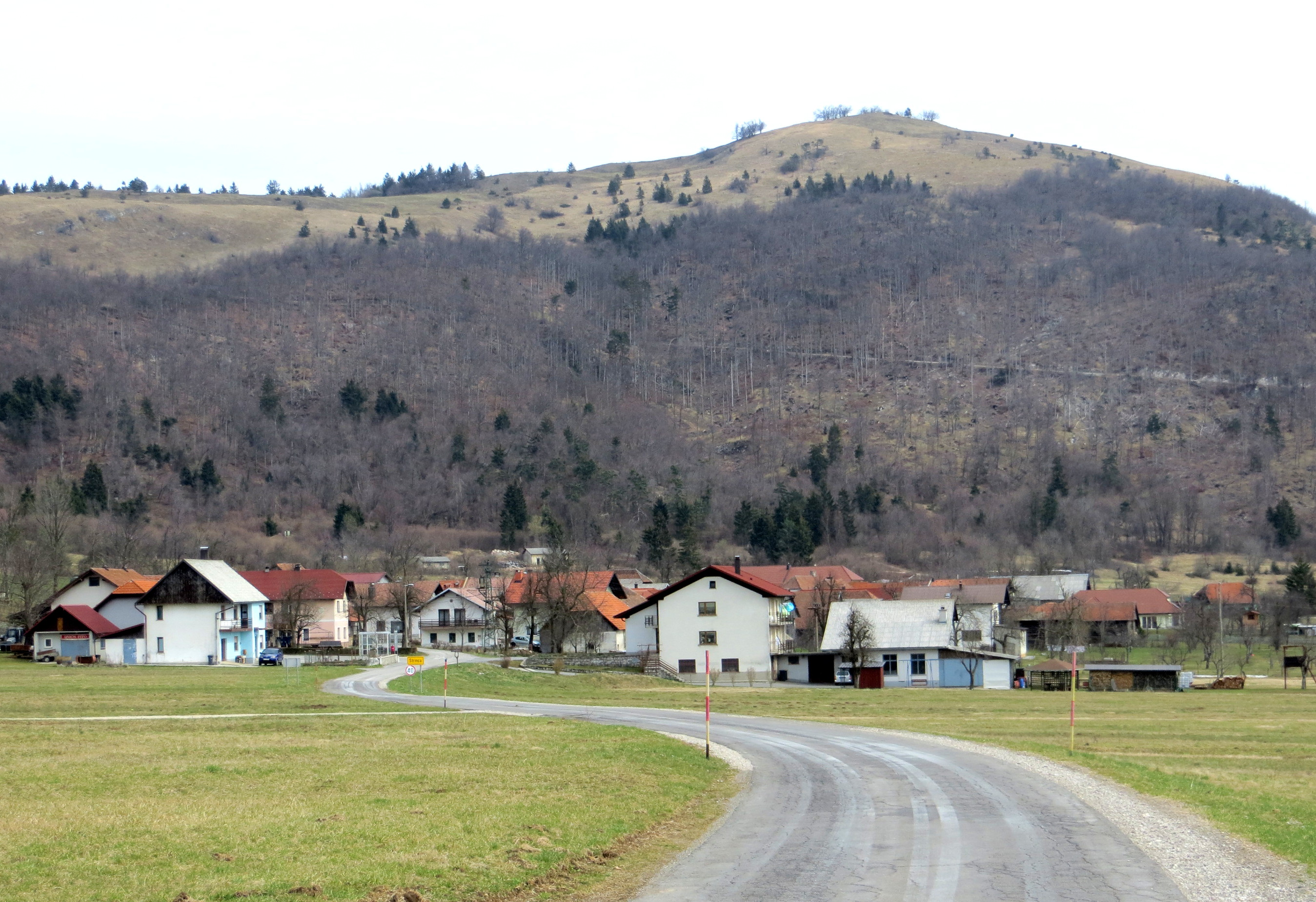

- Location in Slovenia
- Coordinates: 45°49′53.3″N 14°12′1.89″E
- Country: Slovenia
- Traditional region: Inner Carniola
- Statistical region: Littoral–Inner Carniola
- Municipality: Postojna

Area
  - Total: 2.8 km^{2} (1.1 sq mi)
- Elevation: 642.7 m (2,109 ft)

Population (2002)
  - Total: 80

Strmca (pronounced [ˈstəɾmtsa]; in older sources also Strmica, German: Stermiza, Italian: Stermizza) is a small village west of Planina in the Municipality of Postojna in the Inner Carniola region of Slovenia.

== Name ==
The name of the settlement was changed from Strmica to Strmca in 1994.

== Church ==
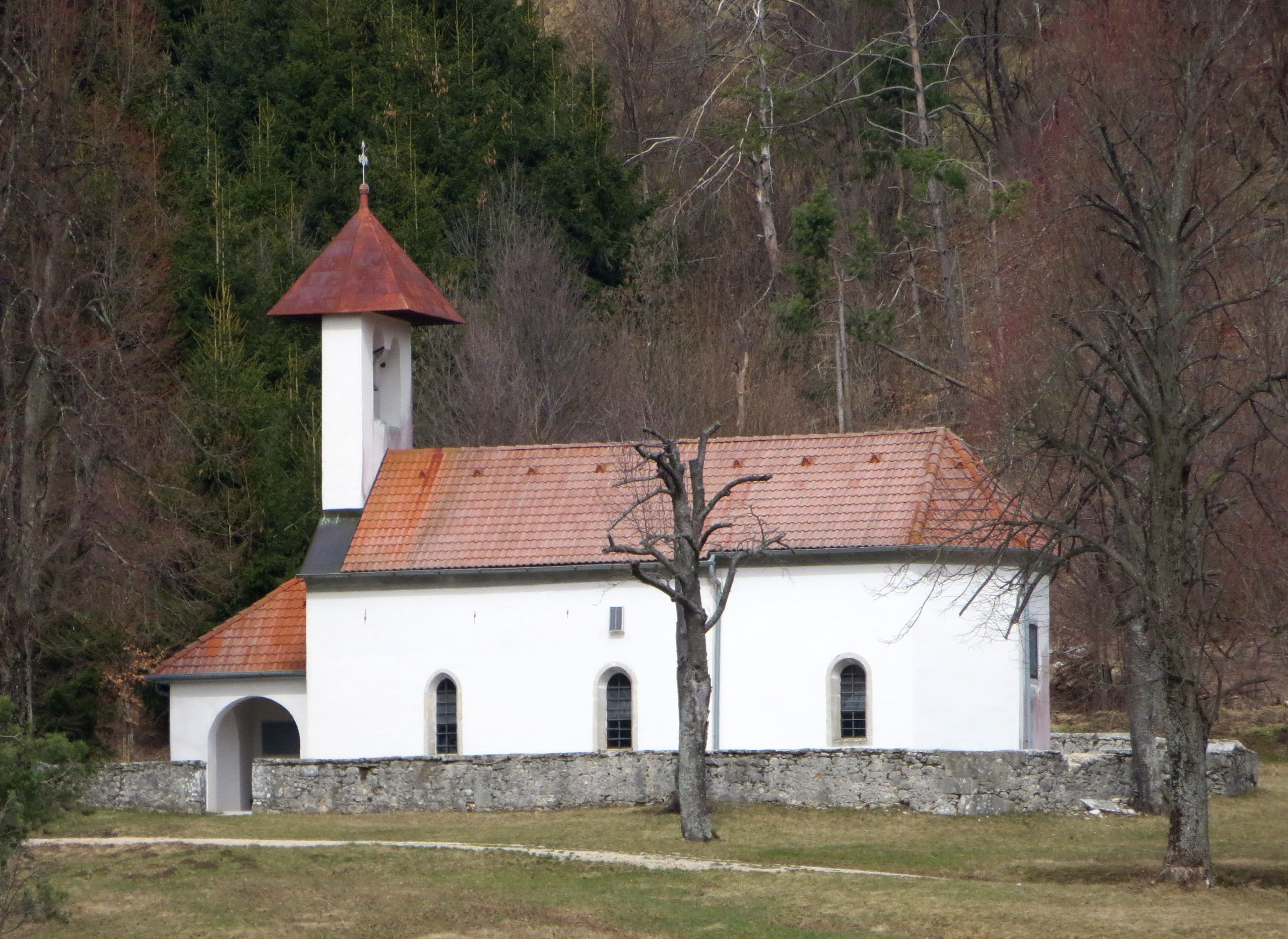
Our Lady of the Snows Church

The local church northwest of the settlement is dedicated to Our Lady of the Snows and belongs to the Parish of Studeno.

== Gallery ==
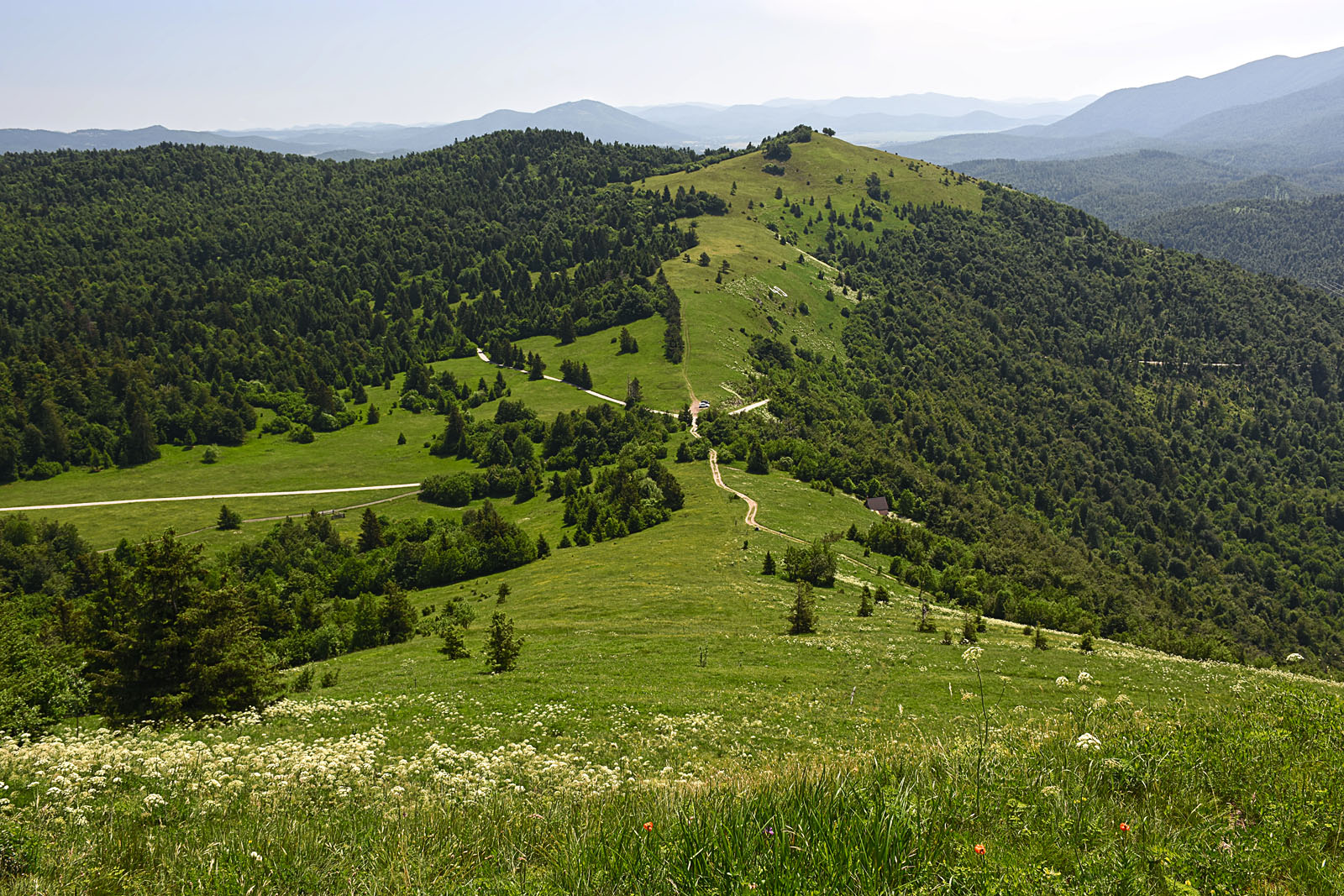
Petrič Hill from the northwest

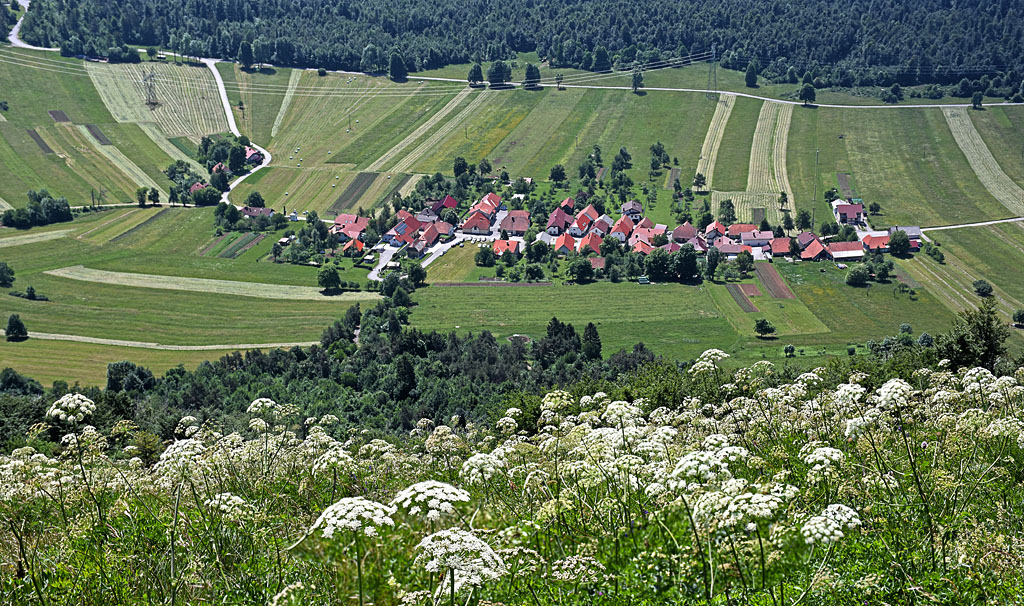
Strmca seen from Lipovec
