= List of cities, towns, and villages in Slovenia: S =

This is a list of cities, towns, and villages in Slovenia, starting with S.

Settlement	Municipality
Sabonje	Ilirska Bistrica
Sad	Ivančna Gorica
Sadinja vas pri Dvoru	Žužemberk
Sadinja vas	Ljubljana
Sadinja vas	Semič
Sadni Hrib	Kočevje
Sajenice	Mirna
Sajevce	Krško
Sajevče	Postojna
Sajevec	Ribnica
Saksid	Nova Gorica
Sakušak	Juršinci
Samotorica	Horjul
Sanabor	Vipava
Sapnik	Kostel
Sarsko	Ig
Satahovci	Murska Sobota
Sava	Litija
Savci	Ormož
Savica	Bohinj
Savina	Ljubno
Savinsko	Slovenska Bistrica
Sebeborci	Moravske Toplice
Sebenje	Tržič
Seč	Kočevje
Seča	Piran
Sečje Selo	Črnomelj
Sečovlje	Piran
Sedlarjevo	Podčetrtek
Sedlašek	Podlehnik
Sedlo	Kobarid
Sedraž	Laško
Segonje	Škocjan
Segovci	Gornja Radgona
Sejanci	Ormož
Sejenice	Trebnje
Sekirišče	Velike Lašče
Sela na Krasu	Miren-Kostanjevica
Sela nad Podmelcem	Tolmin
Sela pri Ajdovcu	Žužemberk
Sela pri Dobovi	Brežice
Sela pri Dobu	Ivančna Gorica
Sela pri Dol. Toplicah	Dolenjske Toplice
Sela pri Dragatušu	Črnomelj
Sela pri Hinjah	Žužemberk
Sela pri Jugorju	Metlika
Sela pri Kamniku	Kamnik
Sela pri Otovcu	Črnomelj
Sela pri Raki	Krško
Sela pri Ratežu	Novo mesto
Sela pri Semiču	Semič
Sela pri Sobračah	Ivančna Gorica
Sela pri Šentjerneju	Šentjernej
Sela pri Šmarju	Grosuplje
Sela pri Štravberku	Novo mesto
Sela pri Šumberku	Trebnje
Sela pri Višnji Gori	Ivančna Gorica
Sela pri Volčah	Tolmin
Sela pri Vrčicah	Semič
Sela pri Zajčjem Vrhu	Novo mesto
Sela pri Zburah	Novo mesto
Sela	Novo mesto
Sela	Osilnica
Sela	Podčetrtek
Sela	Sežana
Sela	Videm
Selca	Železniki
Selce nad Blanco	Sevnica
Selce pri Leskovcu	Krško
Selce pri Moravčah	Moravče
Selce	Lenart
Selce	Litija
Selce	Lukovica
Selce	Pivka
Selce	Tolmin
Selce	Vojnik
Sele - del	Ravne na Koroškem
Sele - del	Slovenj Gradec
Sele pri Polskavi	Slovenska Bistrica
Sele	Šentjur
Selišče	Dolenjske Toplice
Selišče	Tolmin
Selišči	Sveti Jurij ob Ščavnici
Selnica ob Dravi	Selnica ob Dravi
Selnica ob Muri	Šentilj
Selnik	Ig
Selo nad Laškim	Laško
Selo nad Polhovim Gradcem	Dobrova-Polhov Gradec
Selo pri Bledu	Bled
Selo pri Ihanu	Domžale
Selo pri Kostelu	Kostel
Selo pri Mirni	Mirna
Selo pri Moravčah	Moravče
Selo pri Pancah	Ljubljana
Selo pri Radohovi Vasi	Ivančna Gorica
Selo pri Robu	Velike Lašče
Selo pri Vodicah	Vodice
Selo pri Vranskem	Vransko
Selo pri Zagorici	Mirna Peč
Selo pri Zagorju	Zagorje ob Savi
Selo pri Žirovnici	Žirovnica
Selo	Ajdovščina
Selo	Krško
Selo	Moravske Toplice
Selo	Sežana
Selo	Žiri
Selovec	Dravograd
Selska Gora	Mirna
Selski Vrh	Slovenske Konjice
Selšček	Cerknica
Selšek	Litija
Semič	Semič
Senadole	Divača
Senadolice	Sežana
Senčak pri Juršincih	Juršinci
Senčak	Ormož
Senešci	Ormož
Seničica	Medvode
Senično	Tržič
Senik	Brda
Senik	Ormož
Seniški Breg	Kanal
Senovica	Šmarje pri Jelšah
Senovo	Krško
Senožeče	Divača
Senožete	Krško
Senožete	Laško
Senožeti	Dol pri Ljubljani
Senožeti	Zagorje ob Savi
Senuše	Krško
Serdica	Rogašovci
Serjuče	Moravče
Sestrže	Majšperk
Setnica - del	Dobrova-Polhov Gradec
Setnica - del	Medvode
Setnik	Dobrova-Polhov Gradec
Sevce	Laško
Sevec	Slovenska Bistrica
Sevnica	Sevnica
Sevno	Litija
Sevno	Novo mesto
Sežana	Sežana
Sidol	Kamnik
Sidraž	Cerklje na Gorenjskem
Silova	Velenje
Silovec	Brežice
Sinja Gorica	Vrhnika
Sinji Vrh	Črnomelj
Sinovica	Sodražica
Sirči	Koper
Sitarovci	Ljutomer
Sitež	Majšperk
Skadanščina	Hrpelje-Kozina
Skakovci	Cankova
Skaručna	Vodice
Skoke	Miklavž na Dravskem Polju
Skomarje	Zreče
Skopo	Sežana
Skorba	Hajdina
Skorišnjak	Videm
Skorno pri Šoštanju	Šoštanj
Skorno	Šmartno ob Paki
Skrblje	Majšperk
Skrilje	Ajdovščina
Skrovnik	Sevnica
Sladka Gora	Šmarje pri Jelšah
Sladki Vrh	Šentilj
Slamna vas	Metlika
Slamniki	Bled
Slamnjak	Ljutomer
Slance	Celje
Slančji Vrh	Sevnica
Slap ob Idrijci	Tolmin
Slap	Sevnica
Slap	Tržič
Slap	Vipava
Slape	Majšperk
Slapnik	Brda
Slaptinci	Sveti Jurij ob Ščavnici
Slatenik	Pesnica
Slatina pri Dobjem	Dobje
Slatina pri Ponikvi	Šentjur
Slatina v Rožni Dolini	Celje
Slatina	Gorišnica
Slatina	Kungota
Slatina	Šmartno ob Paki
Slatinski Dol	Kungota
Slatna	Radovljica
Slatnik	Ribnica
Slavče	Brda
Slavina	Litija
Slavina	Postojna
Slavinje	Postojna
Slavski Laz	Kostel
Slavšina	Sveti Andraž v Slov. Goricah
Sleme	Bloke
Slepšek	Trebnje
Slinovce	Krško
Slivice	Cerknica
Slivice	Cerknica
Slivje	Hrpelje-Kozina
Slivje	Krško
Slivna	Litija
Slivnica pri Celju	Šentjur
Slivnica pri Mariboru	Hoče-Slivnica
Slivniško Pohorje	Hoče-Slivnica
Slivno	Laško
Slogonsko	Brežice
Sloka Gora	Velike Lašče
Slomi	Dornava
Slope	Hrpelje-Kozina
Slovenj Gradec	Slovenj Gradec
Slovenja vas	Hajdina
Slovenska Bistrica	Slovenska Bistrica
Slovenska vas	Brežice
Slovenska vas	Kočevje
Slovenska vas	Pivka
Slovenska vas	Trebnje
Slovenske Konjice	Slovenske Konjice
Slovenski Javornik	Jesenice
Slugovo	Cerknica
Smast	Kobarid
Smečice	Krško
Smednik	Krško
Smlednik	Medvode
Smokuč	Žirovnica
Smokvica	Koper
Smoldno	Gorenja vas-Poljane
Smolenja vas	Novo mesto
Smoleva	Železniki
Smolinci	Cerkvenjak
Smolnik	Dobrova-Polhov Gradec
Smolnik	Ruše
Smrečje v Črni	Kamnik
Smrečje	Vrhnika
Smrečno	Slovenska Bistrica
Smrje	Ilirska Bistrica
Smrjene	Škofljica
Smuka	Kočevje
Snežatno	Brda
Snežeče	Brda
Snežnik	Ilirska Bistrica
Snovik	Kamnik
Sobenja vas	Brežice
Sobetinci	Markovci
Sobrače	Ivančna Gorica
Socerb	Koper
Socka	Vojnik
Soča	Bovec
Sočerga	Koper
Sodevci	Črnomelj
Sodinci	Ormož
Sodišinci	Tišina (občina)
Sodji Vrh	Semič
Sodna vas	Podčetrtek
Sodražica	Sodražica
Sojek	Slovenske Konjice
Sokoliči	Koper
Solčava	Solčava
Solkan	Nova Gorica
Sopota	Litija
Sopota	Zagorje ob Savi
Sopotnica	Škofja Loka
Sora	Medvode
Sotensko pod Kalobjem	Šentjur
Sotensko pri Šmarju	Šmarje pri Jelšah
Soteska pri Moravčah	Moravče
Soteska	Dolenjske Toplice
Soteska	Kamnik
Sotina	Rogašovci
Soviče	Videm
Sovinja Peč	Kamnik
Sovjak	Sveti Jurij ob Ščavnici
Sovjak	Trnovska vas
Sovodenj	Gorenja vas-Poljane
Sovra	Žiri
Soze	Ilirska Bistrica
Spodnja Bačkova	Benedikt
Spodnja Bela	Preddvor
Spodnja Besnica	Kranj
Spodnja Bilpa	Kočevje
Spodnja Branica	Nova Gorica
Spodnja Brežnica	Slovenska Bistrica
Spodnja Dobrava	Moravče
Spodnja Dobrava	Radovljica
Spodnja Draga	Ivančna Gorica
Spodnja Gorica	Rače-Fram
Spodnja Hajdina	Hajdina
Spodnja Idrija	Idrija
Spodnja Jablanica	Litija
Spodnja Javoršica	Moravče
Spodnja Kanomlja	Idrija
Spodnja Kapla	Podvelka
Spodnja Korena	Duplek
Spodnja Kostrivnica	Rogaška Slatina
Spodnja Libna	Krško
Spodnja Lipnica	Radovljica
Spodnja Ložnica	Slovenska Bistrica
Spodnja Luša	Škofja Loka
Spodnja Nova vas	Slovenska Bistrica
Spodnja Orlica	Radlje ob Dravi
Spodnja Pohanca	Brežice
Spodnja Polskava	Slovenska Bistrica
Spodnja Ponkvica	Šmarje pri Jelšah
Spodnja Pristava	Slovenske Konjice
Spodnja Rečica	Laško
Spodnja Rečica	Mozirje
Spodnja Ročica	Benedikt
Spodnja Selnica	Selnica ob Dravi
Spodnja Senarska	Lenart
Spodnja Senica	Medvode
Spodnja Slivnica	Grosuplje
Spodnja Sorica	Železniki
Spodnja Sveča	Majšperk
Spodnja Ščavnica	Gornja Radgona
Spodnja Velka	Šentilj
Spodnja Vižinga	Radlje ob Dravi
Spodnja Voličina	Lenart
Spodnje Bitnje	Kranj
Spodnje Blato	Grosuplje
Spodnje Brezovo	Ivančna Gorica
Spodnje Danje	Železniki
Spodnje Dobrenje	Pesnica
Spodnje Dule	Krško
Spodnje Duplice	Grosuplje
Spodnje Duplje	Naklo
Spodnje Gameljne	Ljubljana
Spodnje Gorče	Braslovče
Spodnje Gorje	Bled
Spodnje Gruškovje	Podlehnik
Spodnje Grušovje	Slovenske Konjice
Spodnje Grušovlje	Žalec
Spodnje Hlapje	Pesnica
Spodnje Hoče	Hoče-Slivnica
Spodnje Jablane	Kidričevo
Spodnje Jarše	Domžale
Spodnje Jelenje	Litija
Spodnje Jezersko	Jezersko
Spodnje Konjišče	Gornja Radgona
Spodnje Koseze	Lukovica
Spodnje Kraše	Nazarje
Spodnje Laze	Bled
Spodnje Laže	Slovenske Konjice
Spodnje Loke	Lukovica
Spodnje Mestinje	Šmarje pri Jelšah
Spodnje Mladetiče	Sevnica
Spodnje Negonje	Rogaška Slatina
Spodnje Palovče	Kamnik
Spodnje Partinje	Lenart
Spodnje Pijavško	Krško
Spodnje Pirniče	Medvode
Spodnje Pobrežje	Mozirje
Spodnje Poljčane	Slovenska Bistrica
Spodnje Prapreče	Lukovica
Spodnje Prebukovje	Slovenska Bistrica
Spodnje Preloge	Slovenske Konjice
Spodnje Roje	Žalec
Spodnje Sečovo	Rogaška Slatina
Spodnje Selce	Šmarje pri Jelšah
Spodnje Slemene	Šentjur
Spodnje Stranice	Zreče
Spodnje Stranje	Kamnik
Spodnje Škofije	Koper
Spodnje Tinsko	Šmarje pri Jelšah
Spodnje Verjane	Lenart
Spodnje Vetrno	Tržič
Spodnje Vodale	Sevnica
Spodnje Vrtiče	Kungota
Spodnji Boč	Selnica ob Dravi
Spodnji Brnik	Cerklje na Gorenjskem
Spodnji Čačič	Osilnica
Spodnji Dolič	Vitanje
Spodnji Duplek	Duplek
Spodnji Gabrnik	Rogaška Slatina
Spodnji Gaj pri Pragerskem	Kidričevo
Spodnji Gasteraj	Lenart
Spodnji Hotič	Litija
Spodnji Ivanjci	Gornja Radgona
Spodnji Jakobski Dol	Pesnica
Spodnji Jernej	Slovenske Konjice
Spodnji Kamenščak	Ljutomer
Spodnji Ključarovci	Ormož
Spodnji Kocjan	Radenci
Spodnji Leskovec	Videm
Spodnji Log	Kočevje
Spodnji Log	Litija
Spodnji Otok	Radovljica
Spodnji Petelinjek	Lukovica
Spodnji Porčič	Lenart
Spodnji Prekar	Moravče
Spodnji Razbor	Slovenj Gradec
Spodnji Slemen	Selnica ob Dravi
Spodnji Stari Grad	Krško
Spodnji Tuštanj	Moravče
Spodnji Velovlek	Ptuj
Spodnji Vrsnik	Idrija
Spodnji Žerjavci	Lenart
Spuhlja	Ptuj
Srakovlje	Kranj
Srebotje	Šentilj
Srebrniče	Novo mesto
Srebrnik	Bistrica ob Sotli
Sredgora	Semič
Središče ob Dravi	Ormož
Središče	Moravske Toplice
Srednik	Sevnica
Srednja Bela	Preddvor
Srednja Bistrica	Črenšovci
Srednja Dobrava	Radovljica
Srednja Kanomlja	Idrija
Srednja vas - Goriče	Kranj
Srednja vas pri Dragi	Loški Potok
Srednja vas pri Kamniku	Kamnik
Srednja vas pri Polhovem Gradcu	Dobrova-Polhov Gradec
Srednja vas pri Šenčurju	Šenčur
Srednja vas v Bohinju	Bohinj
Srednja vas	Radovljica
Srednja vas	Semič
Srednja vas-Loški Potok	Loški Potok
Srednja vas-Poljane	Gorenja vas-Poljane
Srednje Arto	Krško
Srednje Bitnje	Kranj
Srednje Brdo	Gorenja vas-Poljane
Srednje Gameljne	Ljubljana
Srednje Grčevje	Novo mesto
Srednje Jarše	Domžale
Srednje Laknice	Trebnje
Srednje Pijavško	Krško
Srednje	Maribor
Srednji Dolič	Mislinja
Srednji Gasteraj	Lenart
Srednji Globodol	Mirna Peč
Srednji Lipovec	Žužemberk
Srednji Potok	Kostel
Srednji Radenci	Črnomelj
Srednji Vrh	Dobrova-Polhov Gradec
Srednji Vrh	Kranjska Gora
Sremič	Krško
Srgaši	Koper
Srnjak	Velike Lašče
Srobotnik ob Kolpi	Kostel
Srobotnik pri Velikih Laščah	Velike Lašče
Sromlje	Brežice
Srpenica	Bovec
Srževica	Šentjur
Stahovica	Kamnik
Staje	Ig
Stan	Mirna
Stanečka vas	Majšperk
Stanetinci	Cerkvenjak
Stanetinci	Sveti Jurij ob Ščavnici
Stanežiče	Ljubljana
Staniše	Škofja Loka
Stanjevci	Gornji Petrovci
Stankovo	Brežice
Stanošina	Podlehnik
Stanovišče	Kobarid
Stanovno	Ormož
Stanovsko	Slovenska Bistrica
Stara Bučka	Škocjan
Stara Cerkev	Kočevje
Stara Cesta	Ljutomer
Stara Fužina	Bohinj
Stara Gora pri Šentilju	Šentilj
Stara Gora pri Velikem Gabru	Litija
Stara Gora	Benedikt
Stara Gora	Nova Gorica
Stara Gora	Sveti Jurij ob Ščavnici
Stara Lipa	Črnomelj
Stara Gora	Mirna
Stara Loka	Škofja Loka
Stara Nova vas	Križevci
Stara Oselica	Gorenja vas-Poljane
Stara Sela	Kamnik
Stara Sušica	Pivka
Stara vas	Postojna
Stara vas-Bizeljsko	Brežice
Stara Vrhnika	Vrhnika
Stare Slemene	Slovenske Konjice
Stare Žage	Dolenjske Toplice
Stari Breg	Kočevje
Stari Dvor	Radeče
Stari Grad v Podbočju	Krško
Stari Grad	Krško
Stari Grad	Slovenska Bistrica
Stari Kot	Loški Potok
Stari Log	Kočevje
Stari Log	Slovenska Bistrica
Stari trg ob Kolpi	Črnomelj
Stari trg pri Ložu	Loška Dolina
Stari trg	Ivančna Gorica
Stari trg	Slovenj Gradec
Starihov Vrh	Semič
Staro Brezje	Kočevje
Staro Selo	Kobarid
Starod	Ilirska Bistrica
Starošince	Kidričevo
Starše	Starše
Stavča vas	Žužemberk
Stavešinci	Gornja Radgona
Stavešinski Vrh	Gornja Radgona
Stebljevek	Kamnik
Stegne	Moravče
Stehanja vas	Trebnje
Stelnik	Kostel
Stenica	Vitanje
Stepani	Koper
Steske	Nova Gorica
Stična	Ivančna Gorica
Stirpnik	Škofja Loka
Stiška vas	Cerklje na Gorenjskem
Stogovci	Gornja Radgona
Stogovci	Majšperk
Stojanski Vrh	Brežice
Stojnci	Markovci
Stolnik	Kamnik
Stolovnik	Krško
Stomaž	Ajdovščina
Stomaž	Sežana
Stopce	Laško
Stopče	Šentjur
Stope	Velike Lašče
Stoperce	Majšperk
Stopiče	Novo mesto
Stopnik	Tolmin
Stopnik	Vransko
Stopno	Slovenska Bistrica
Stopno	Škocjan
Strahinj	Naklo
Strahomer	Ig
Strajna	Podlehnik
Strane	Postojna
Stranice	Zreče
Stranje pri Dobrniču	Trebnje
Stranje pri Škocjanu	Škocjan
Stranje pri Velikem Gabru	Trebnje
Stranje	Krško
Stranje	Šmarje pri Jelšah
Stranska vas ob Višnjici	Ivančna Gorica
Stranska vas pri Semiču	Semič
Stranska vas	Dobrova-Polhov Gradec
Stranska vas	Novo mesto
Stranske Makole	Slovenska Bistrica
Stranski Vrh	Litija
Straška Gorca	Šentjur
Straža na Gori	Šentjur
Straža pri Dolu	Vojnik
Straža pri Krškem	Krško
Straža pri Moravčah	Moravče
Straža pri Novi Cerkvi	Vojnik
Straža pri Oplotnici	Oplotnica
Straža pri Raki	Krško
Straža	Cerkno
Straža	Lukovica
Straža	Novo mesto
Straža	Trebnje
Straže	Lenart
Stražgonjca	Kidričevo
Stražica	Vojnik
Stražišče	Cerknica
Stražišče	Ravne na Koroškem
Stražnji Vrh	Črnomelj
Strehovci	Dobrovnik
Strejaci	Dornava
Strelac	Novo mesto
Strelci	Markovci
Strensko	Laško
Strezetina	Ormož
Strjanci	Ormož
Strletje	Velike Lašče
Strmca	Bloke
Strmca	Laško
Strmca	Postojna
Strmec na Predelu	Bovec
Strmec nad Dobrno	Dobrna
Strmec pri Destrniku	Destrnik
Strmec pri Leskovcu	Videm
Strmec pri Ormožu	Ormož
Strmec pri Polenšaku	Dornava
Strmec pri Sv. Florijanu	Rogaška Slatina
Strmec	Idrija
Strmec	Litija
Strmec	Luče
Strmec	Velike Lašče
Strmica	Škofja Loka
Strmo Rebro	Krško
Strnišče	Kidričevo
Stročja vas	Ljutomer
Strojiči	Osilnica
Strojna	Ravne na Koroškem
Strtenica	Šmarje pri Jelšah
Strtenik	Slovenske Konjice
Strug	Slovenska Bistrica
Strukovci	Puconci
Strunjan	Piran
Stružnica	Kostel
Stržišče	Sevnica
Stržišče	Tolmin
Studena Gora	Ilirska Bistrica
Studenca	Kamnik
Studence	Hrastnik
Studence	Žalec
Studenčice	Medvode
Studenčice	Radovljica
Studenec na Blokah	Bloke
Studenec pri Krtini	Domžale
Studenec	Postojna
Studenec	Sevnica
Studenec	Trebnje
Studenice	Slovenska Bistrica
Studeno na Blokah	Bloke
Studeno	Postojna
Studeno	Železniki
Studor v Bohinju	Bohinj
Studor	Gorenja vas-Poljane
Suha pri Predosljah	Kranj
Suha	Škofja Loka
Suhadol	Laško
Suhadol	Slovenske Konjice
Suhadole	Komenda
Suhadole	Litija
Suhi Potok	Kočevje
Suhi Vrh	Moravske Toplice
Suhi Vrh	Prevalje
Suho	Dobje
Suhor pri Dolenjskih Toplicah	Dolenjske Toplice
Suhor	Kostel
Suhor	Novo mesto
Suhorje	Pivka
Suša	Gorenja vas-Poljane
Suša	Lukovica
Sušak	Ilirska Bistrica
Sušica	Ivančna Gorica
Sušje	Ribnica
Sužid	Kobarid
Sv. Ana v Slovenskih Goricah	Sveta Ana (občina)
Sv. Andrej	Škofja Loka
Sv. Anton na Pohorju	Radlje ob Dravi
Sv. Anton	Koper
Sv. Barbara	Škofja Loka
Sv. Boštjan	Dravograd
Sv. Danijel	Dravograd
Sv. Duh na Ostrem Vrhu	Selnica ob Dravi
Sv. Duh	Dravograd
Sv. Duh	Škofja Loka
Sv. Ema	Podčetrtek
Sv. Florijan	Rogaška Slatina
Sv. Gregor	Ribnica
Sv. Jernej nad Muto	Muta
Sv. Jurij	Grosuplje
Sv. Jurij	Rogatec
Sv. Lenart	Železniki
Sv. Lovrenc	Prebold
Sv. Ožbolt	Škofja Loka
Sv. Peter	Piran
Sv. Petra Hrib	Škofja Loka
Sv. Primož na Pohorju	Vuzenica
Sv. Primož nad Muto	Muta
Sv. Trije Kralji v Slovenskih Goricah	Benedikt
Sv. Trije kralji	Radlje ob Dravi
Sv. Trojica v Slovenskih Goricah	Lenart
Sv. Trojica	Domžale
Sv. Vid	Vuzenica
Sv. Vrh	Trebnje
Svečane	Šentilj
Svečina	Kungota
Sveta Trojica	Bloke
Svetelka	Šentjur
Sveti Andrej	Moravče
Sveti Duh	Bloke
Sveti Jernej	Slovenske Konjice
Sveti Jošt nad Kranjem	Kranj
Sveti Jurij ob Ščavnici	Sveti Jurij ob Ščavnici
Sveti Jurij	Rogašovci
Sveti Lenart	Cerklje na Gorenjskem
Sveti Štefan	Šmarje pri Jelšah
Sveti Tomaž	Ormož
Sveti Vid	Cerknica
Svetina	Štore
Svetinci	Destrnik
Svetinja	Trebnje
Svetli Dol	Štore
Svetli Potok	Kočevje
Sveto	Komen
Svibnik	Črnomelj
Svibno	Radeče
Svinjsko	Sevnica
Svino	Kobarid
Svržaki	Metlika
