= Sveta Trojica =

Sveta Trojica may refer to several places in Slovenia:

- Sveta Trojica, Bloke, a settlement in the Municipality of Bloke
- Sveta Trojica, Domžale, a settlement in the Municipality of Domžale
- Sveta Trojica v Slovenskih Goricah, a settlement in the Municipality of Sveta Trojica v Slovenskih Goricah
