= Svetinja =

Svetinja may refer to:

- Svetinja (album), a 2005 album by Miroslav Škoro
- Svetinja, Croatia, a village near Jakšić
- Svetinja, Trebnje, a village in Slovenia
