= Stolnik (disambiguation) =

Stolnik was a court office in Lithuania, Poland, Ukraine and Russia.

Stolnik may also refer to:

- Slavko Stolnik, Croatian naive painter and sculptor
- Stolnik, Kamnik, village in Slovenia
- Stolnik Peak, Antarctica
- Stolnik, Bulgaria, village

== See also ==
- Stolnic
