= Gorenje, Lukovica =

Gorenje
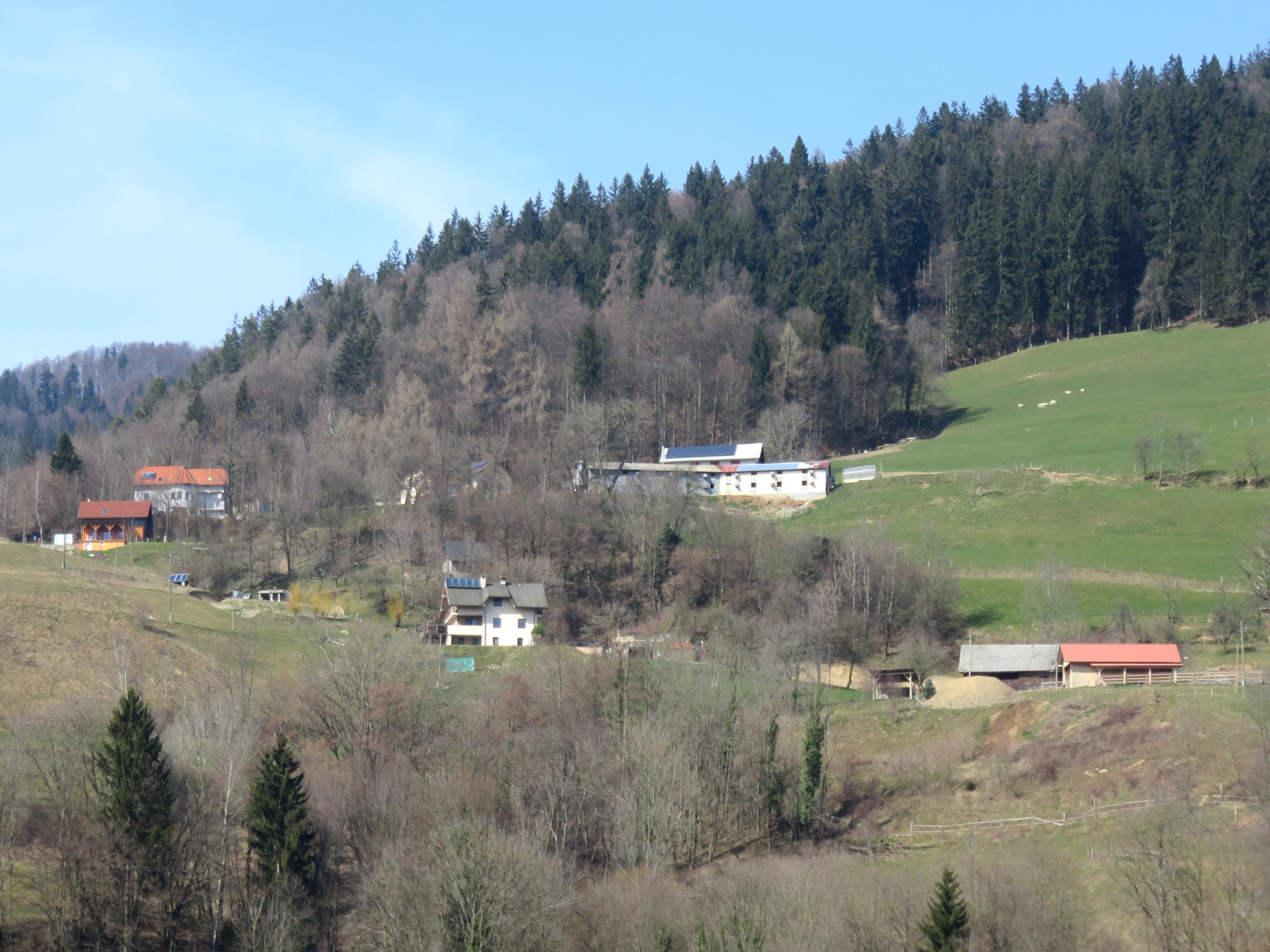

- Location in Slovenia
- Coordinates: 46°11′32.04″N 14°49′31.76″E
- Country: Slovenia
- Traditional region: Upper Carniola
- Statistical region: Central Slovenia
- Municipality: Lukovica

Area
  - Total: 0.71 km^{2} (0.27 sq mi)
- Elevation: 706.5 m (2,318 ft)

Population (2002)
  - Total: 26

Gorenje (pronounced [ɡɔˈɾeːnjɛ]) is a small settlement in the Municipality of Lukovica in the eastern part of the Upper Carniola region of Slovenia.

== Name ==
Gorenje was attested in historical sources as Goreynach in 1385, Kôrench c. 1400, and Goreyne in 1458, among other spellings. The name Gorenje is shared by several settlements in Slovenia. It arose through ellipsis of Gorenje selo (literally, 'upper village'), denoting the elevation of the place in relation to a neighboring settlement. Gorenje stands about 87 meters (285 ft) higher than Suša, the nearest neighboring village.
