= Sveti Duh =

Sveti Duh (literally, 'Holy Spirit') may refer to several places in Slovenia:

- Podolševa, a settlement in the Municipality of Solčava, known as Sveti Duh until 1953
- Sveti Duh, Bloke, a settlement in the Municipality of Bloke
- Sveti Duh, Dravograd, a settlement in the Municipality of Dravograd
- Sveti Duh na Ostrem Vrhu, a settlement in the Municipality of Selnica ob Dravi
- Sveti Duh, Škofja Loka, a settlement in the Municipality of Škofja Loka
