= Spodnji Log, Litija =

Spodnji Log
- Location in Slovenia
- Coordinates: 46°5′3.97″N 14°53′29.44″E
- Country: Slovenia
- Traditional region: Lower Carniola
- Statistical region: Central Sava
- Municipality: Litija

Area
  - Total: 7.59 km^{2} (2.93 sq mi)
- Elevation: 232.3 m (762 ft)

Population (2002)
  - Total: 224
- Postal code: 1282

Spodnji Log (pronounced [ˈspoːdnji ˈloːk]; German: Unterlog) is a village on the right bank of the Sava River in the Municipality of Litija in central Slovenia. The area is included with the rest of the municipality in the Central Sava Statistical Region. Traditionally, it was part of the Lower Carniola region.

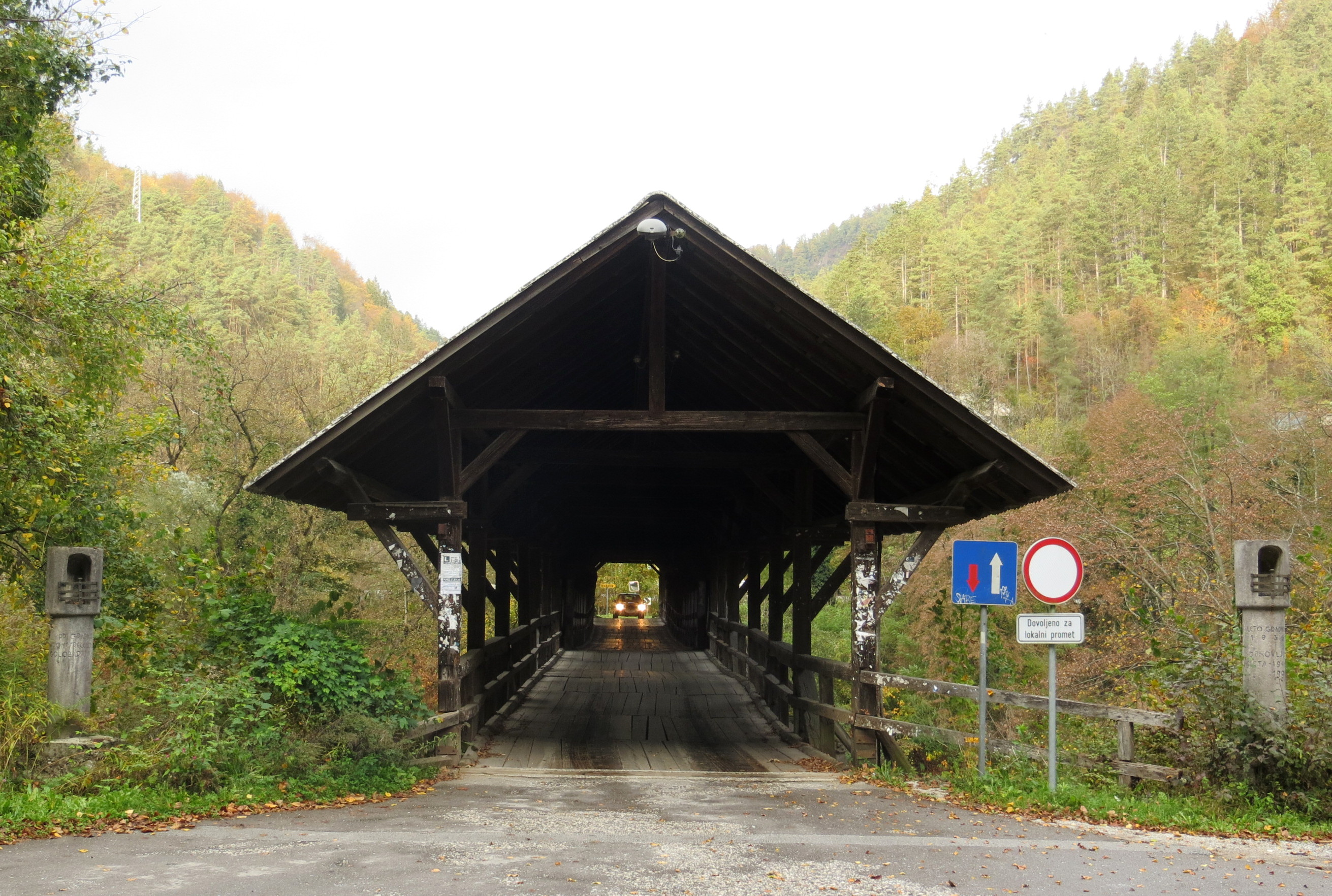
Bridge over the Sava River

A covered bridge, built in 1935, stands east of the settlement. It crosses the Sava River to the village of Sava.
