= Suhadole, Litija =

Suhadole
- Location in Slovenia
- Coordinates: 46°1′30.99″N 15°2′8.79″E
- Country: Slovenia
- Traditional region: Lower Carniola
- Statistical region: Central Sava
- Municipality: Litija

Area
  - Total: 0.43 km^{2} (0.17 sq mi)
- Elevation: 655.2 m (2,150 ft)

Population (2002)
  - Total: 9
- Postal code: 1273

Suhadole (pronounced [suxaˈdoːlɛ]) is a small settlement southeast of Dole in the Municipality of Litija in central Slovenia. The area is part of the traditional region of Lower Carniola and is now included with the rest of the municipality in the Central Sava Statistical Region.

A number of Iron Age burials have been excavated in the Kovač Hill (Slovene: Kovačev hrib) area. Artifacts from the excavations are kept at the Vienna Museum of Natural History.
