= Stankovo, Brežice =

Stankovo
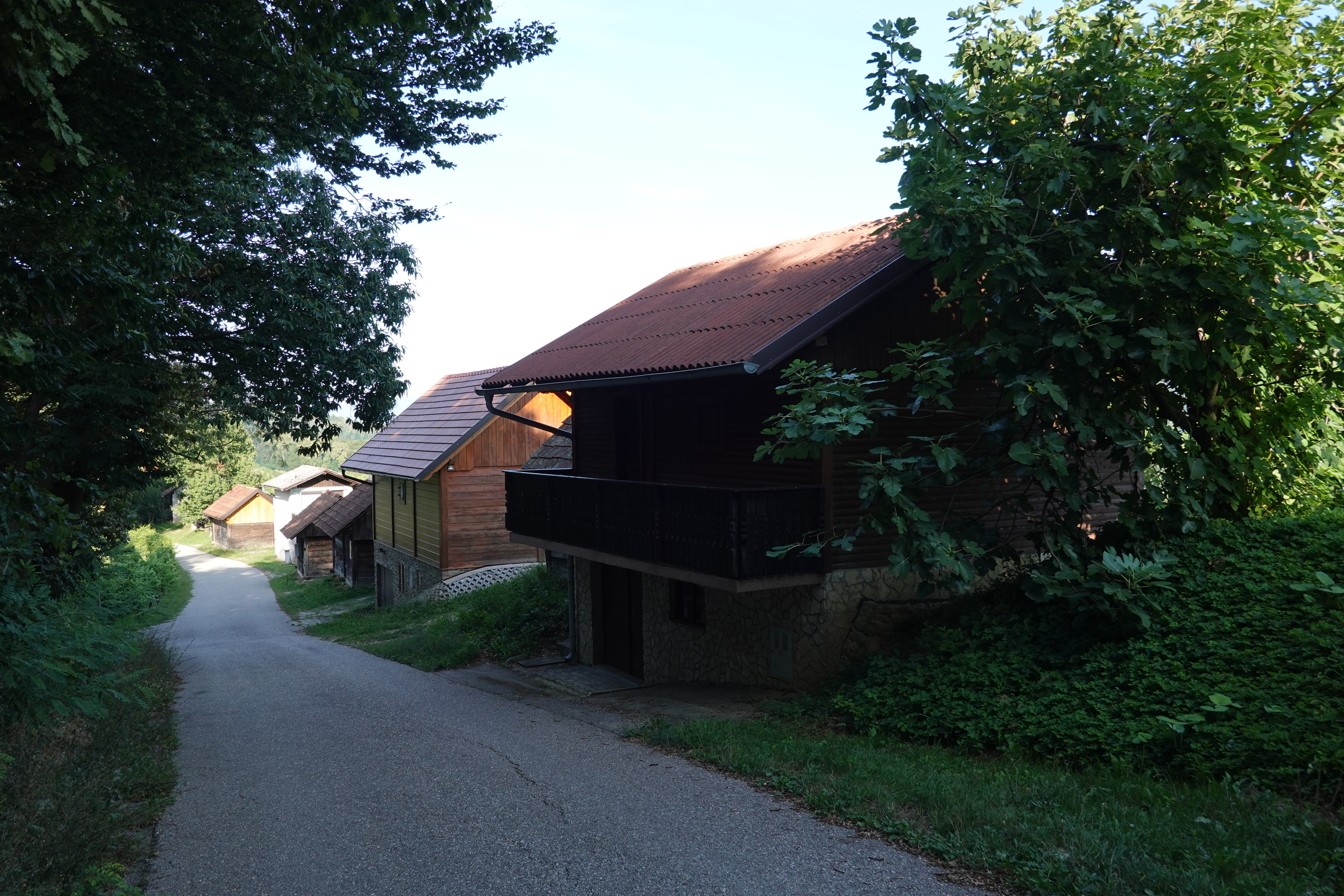

- Location in Slovenia
- Coordinates: 45°52′14.06″N 15°33′38.02″E
- Country: Slovenia
- Traditional region: Lower Carniola
- Statistical region: Lower Sava
- Municipality: Brežice

Area
  - Total: 0.6 km^{2} (0.23 sq mi)
- Elevation: 211.4 m (694 ft)

Population (2020)
  - Total: 9
  - Density: 15/km^{2} (39/sq mi)

Stankovo (pronounced [stanˈkɔːʋo] or [stanˈkoːʋo]) is a village in the hills south of Velike Malence in the Municipality of Brežice in eastern Slovenia. The area is part of the traditional region of Lower Carniola. It is now included with the rest of the municipality in the Lower Sava Statistical Region.

The local church is dedicated to Saint Peter and belongs to the Parish of Čatež ob Savi. It dates to the 17th century with a mid-19th-century belfry.
