= Sušica, Ivančna Gorica =

Sušica
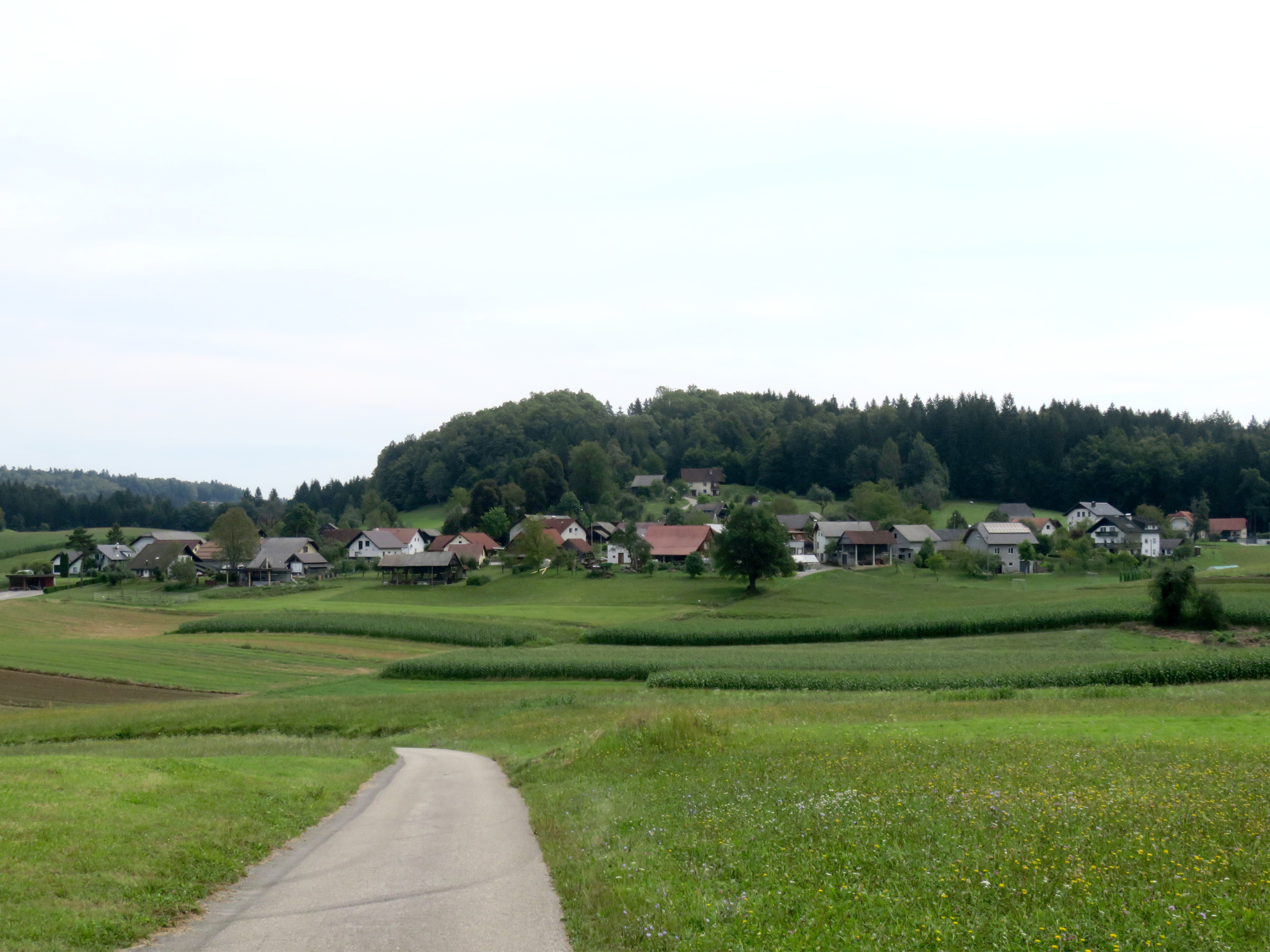

- Location in Slovenia
- Coordinates: 45°53′34″N 14°49′24″E
- Country: Slovenia
- Traditional region: Lower Carniola
- Statistical region: Central Slovenia
- Municipality: Ivančna Gorica

Area
  - Total: 2.9 km^{2} (1.1 sq mi)
- Elevation: 330 m (1,080 ft)

Population (2002)
  - Total: 109

Sušica (pronounced [suˈʃiːtsa]; German: Schuschitz) is a village southeast of Muljava in the Municipality of Ivančna Gorica in central Slovenia. The area is part of the historical region of Lower Carniola. The municipality is now included in the Central Slovenia Statistical Region.

== Name ==
Sušica was attested in historical sources as Durre in 1250, Darrendorff in 1463, Dardorff in 1464, and Schusitz in 1505. Like the German names (cf. dürr 'arid'), the Slovenian name is derived from the adjective suh 'dry', originally referring to a seasonal creek that would go dry during droughts. Locally, the village is known as Šica.

== Church ==
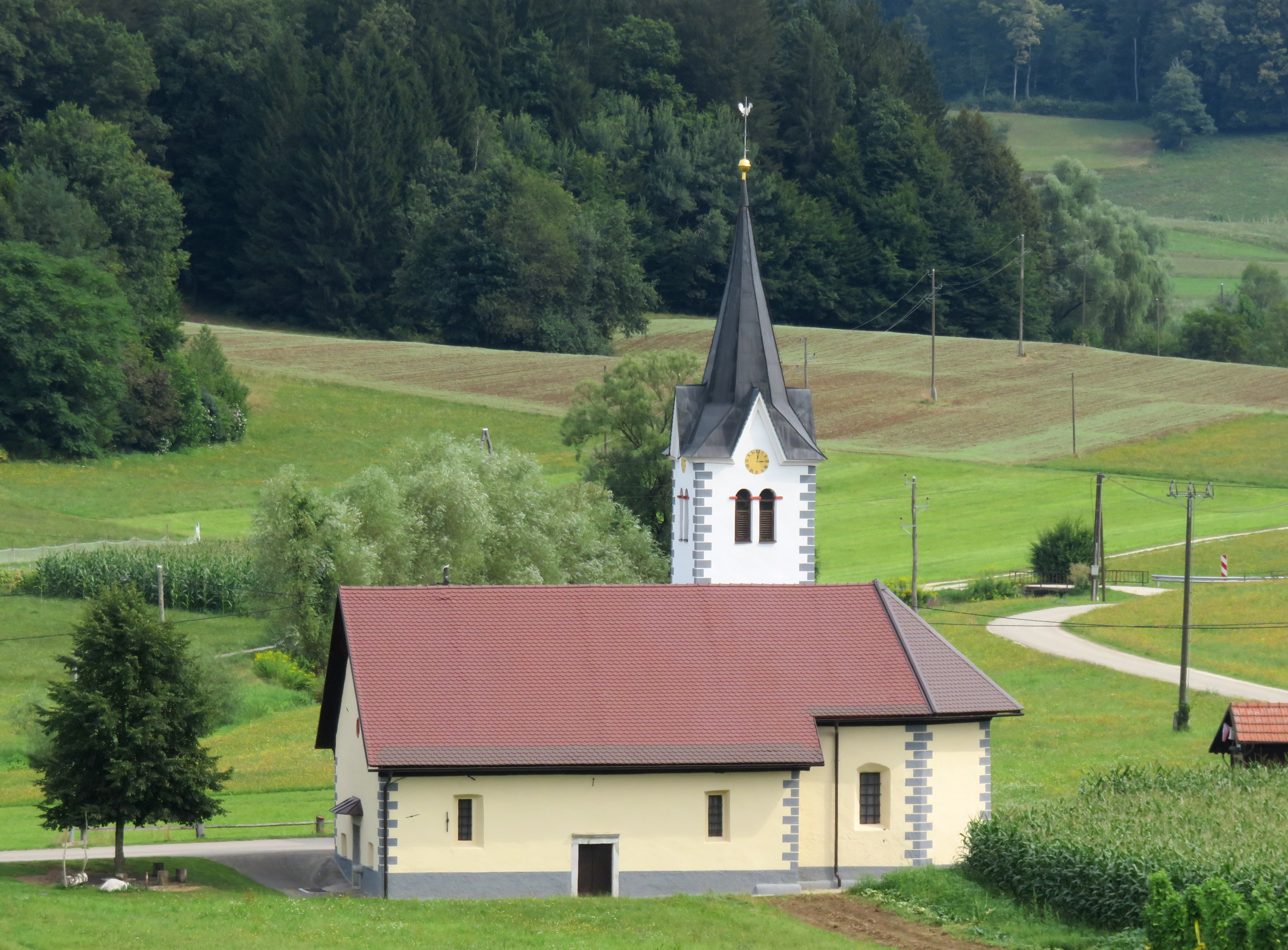
Saint Stephen's Church

The local church is dedicated to Saint Stephen (Slovene: sveti Štefan) and belongs to the Parish of Krka. It dates to the late 15th century. It is a single-nave church with a stone entryway. The octagonal chancel has three bays and a vault in the Gothic style, and a bell tower stands on the north side of the church. The church's furnishings date from the 19th century.
