= Selce, Lukovica =

Selce
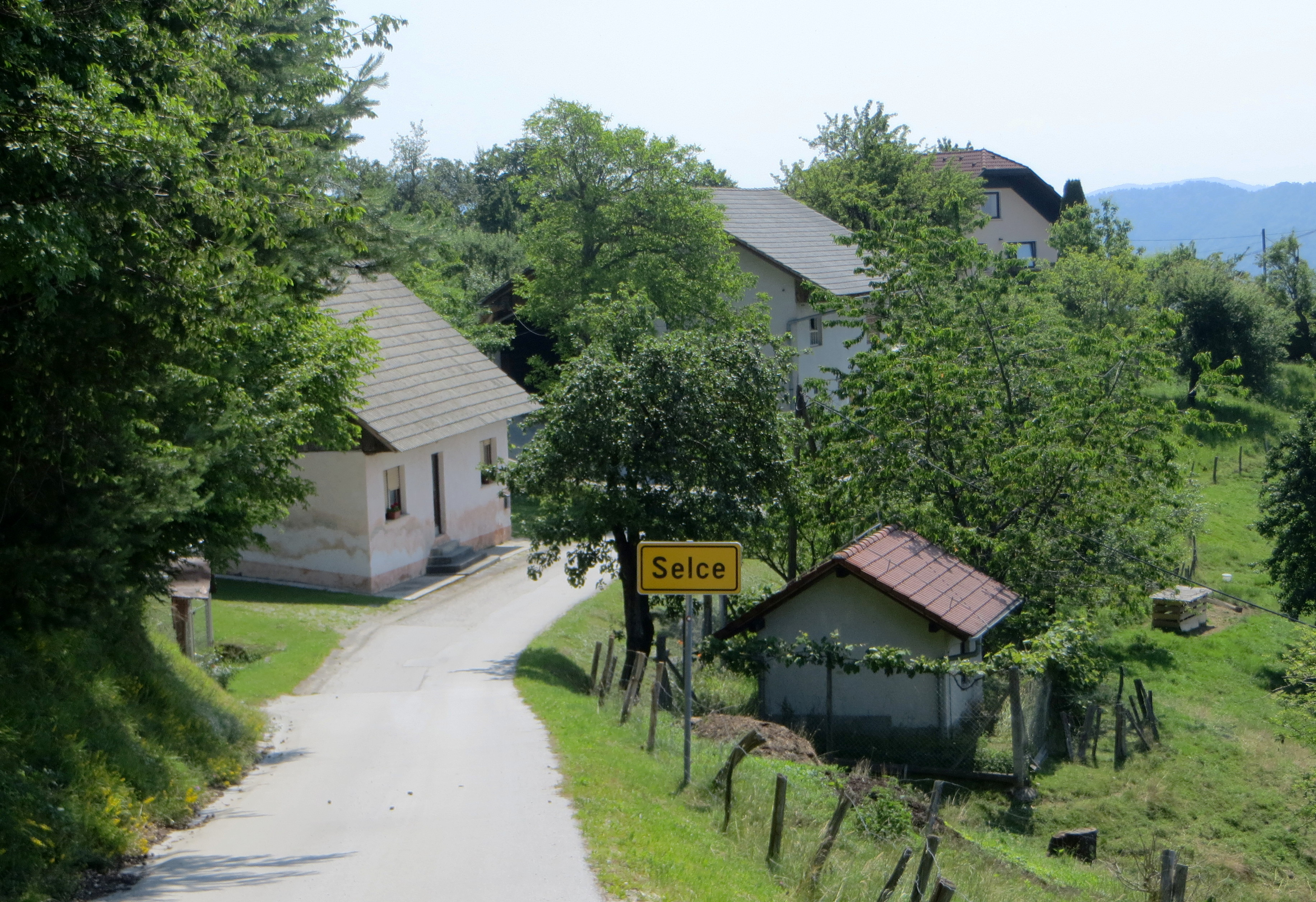

- Location in Slovenia
- Coordinates: 46°11′39.31″N 14°47′37.93″E
- Country: Slovenia
- Traditional region: Upper Carniola
- Statistical region: Central Slovenia
- Municipality: Lukovica

Area
  - Total: 0.67 km^{2} (0.26 sq mi)
- Elevation: 695.1 m (2,281 ft)

Population (2002)
  - Total: 28

Selce (pronounced [ˈsɛːu̯tsɛ]) is a small settlement in the hills above Blagovica in the Municipality of Lukovica in the eastern part of the Upper Carniola region of Slovenia.
