= Stranje, Krško =

Stranje
- Location in Slovenia
- Coordinates: 46°2′17.57″N 15°24′37.17″E
- Country: Slovenia
- Traditional region: Styria
- Statistical region: Lower Sava
- Municipality: Krško

Area
  - Total: 6.06 km^{2} (2.34 sq mi)
- Elevation: 440.9 m (1,447 ft)

Population (2002)
  - Total: 110
- Postal code: 8283

Stranje (pronounced [ˈstɾaːnjɛ], German: Streine) is a village in the hills northwest of Senovo in the Municipality of Krško in eastern Slovenia. The area is part of the traditional region of Styria. It is now included with the rest of the municipality in the Lower Sava Statistical Region.

== Mass grave ==
Stranje is the site of a mass grave from the Second World War. The Stranje Mass Grave (Slovene: Grobišče Stranje) is located in a depression in the woods above the house at Stranje no. 17. Two grave sites at the location are marked with crosses. They contain the remains of four or five people that intended to join the Partisans. However, the Partisans suspected them of betrayal and shot them instead. The remains of multiple victims were confirmed by tests at the site in 2010.

== Church ==
The local church is dedicated to Saint Achacius (Slovene: sveti Ahac) and belongs to the Parish of Brestanica. It was built in 1494 and restyled in the Baroque style in the 18th century.
