= Selce, Litija =

Selce
- Location in Slovenia
- Coordinates: 46°1′5″N 15°2′38″E
- Country: Slovenia
- Traditional region: Lower Carniola
- Statistical region: Central Sava
- Municipality: Litija

Area
  - Total: 2.42 km^{2} (0.93 sq mi)
- Elevation: 576.4 m (1,891 ft)

Population (2002)
  - Total: 15
- Postal code: 1273

Selce (pronounced [ˈseːu̯tsɛ]) is a settlement southeast of Dole the Municipality of Litija in central Slovenia. The area is part of the traditional region of Lower Carniola. It is now included with the rest of the municipality in the Central Sava Statistical Region.

North of the settlement are the remains of an Iron Age hillfort with still visible earthworks and a flattened enclosure.
