= Sopotnica, Škofja Loka =

Sopotnica
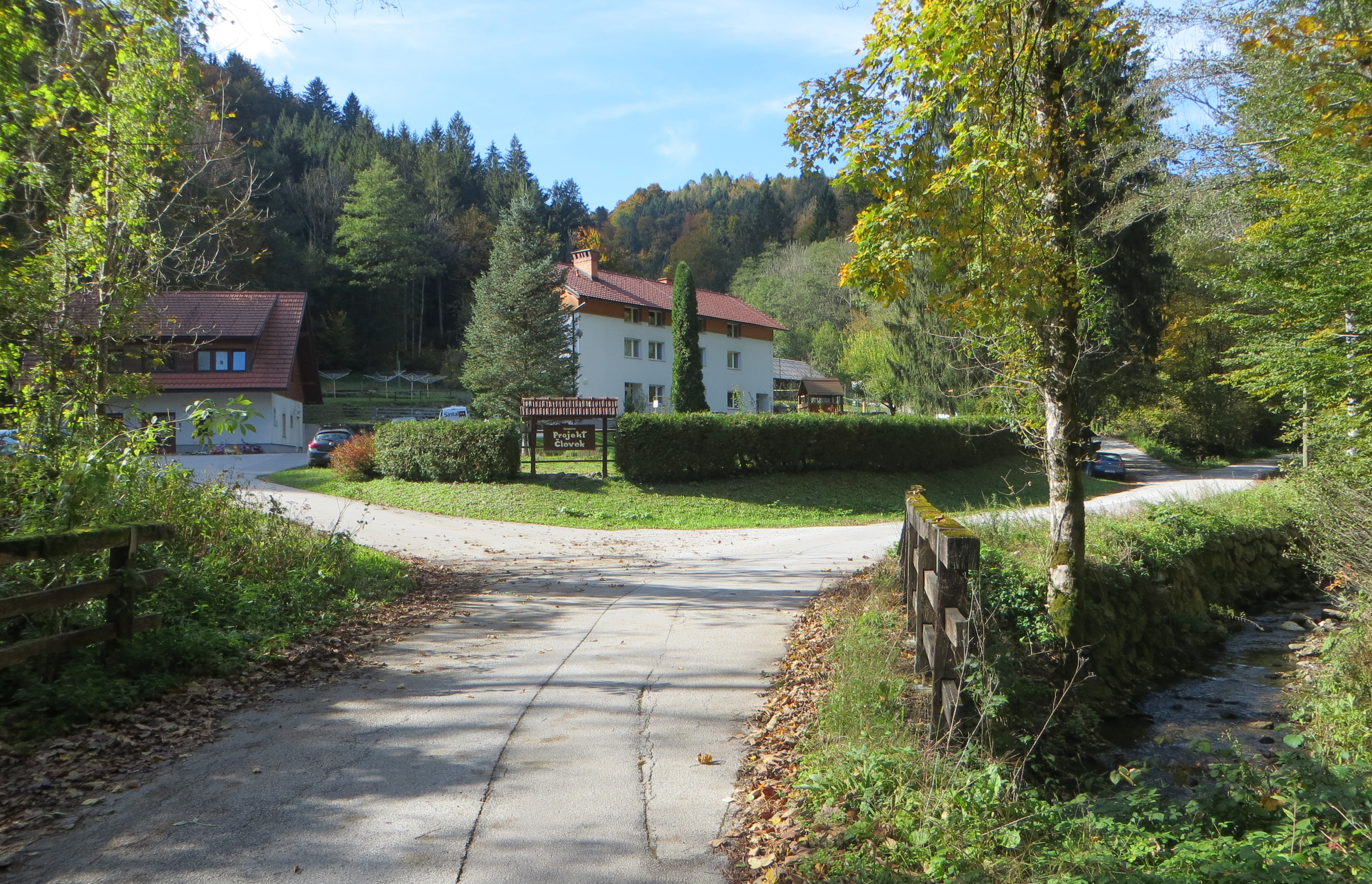

- Location in Slovenia
- Coordinates: 46°9′30.99″N 14°14′11.75″E
- Country: Slovenia
- Traditional region: Upper Carniola
- Statistical region: Upper Carniola
- Municipality: Škofja Loka

Area
  - Total: 6.06 km^{2} (2.34 sq mi)
- Elevation: 612.5 m (2,010 ft)

Population (2002)
  - Total: 70

Sopotnica (pronounced [sɔpɔˈtniːtsa]; German: Sapotnica) is a settlement in the Municipality of Škofja Loka in the Upper Carniola region of Slovenia.

== History ==
Sopotnica was settled by Slovenes from Carinthia. In 1869 the settlement had 20 houses and a population of 137. In 1971 the population was only 56.

=== Mass graves ===
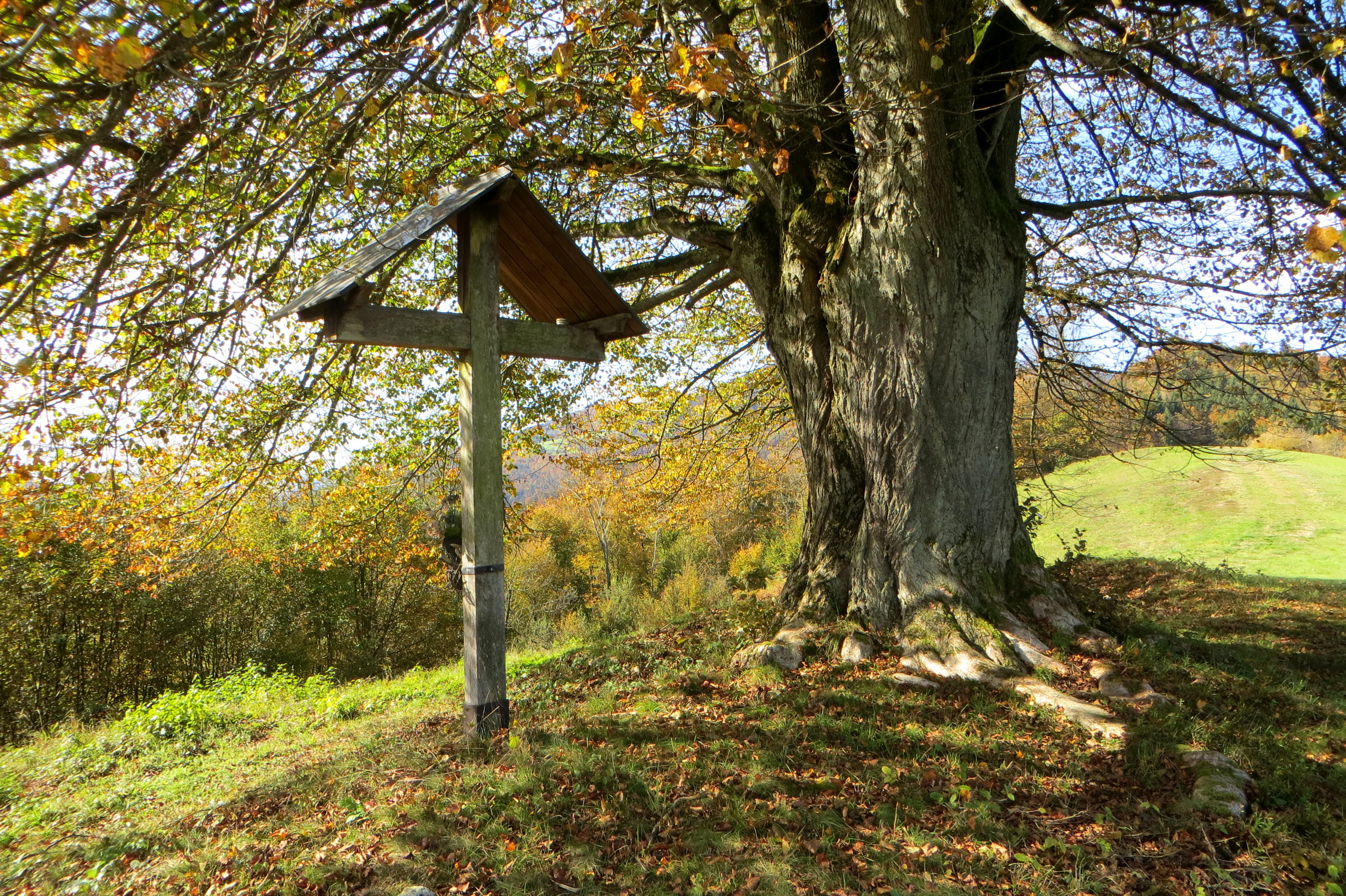
Muretovina 1 Mass Grave

Sopotnica is the site of two known mass graves from the period immediately after the Second World War. The Muretovina 1 and 2 mass graves (Slovene: Grobišče Muretovina 1, 2) are located on the southern slope of Mure Hill (Muretov grič) north of the Poljane Sora River, in a meadow at the abandoned Mure farm. The first grave contains the remains of seven Home Guard soldiers that were murdered after the war and buried in a firing trench at the former Home Guard post at the site. The second grave contains the remains of up to 17 Home Guard soldiers that were murdered after the war and thrown into an abandoned well. The remains were completely or mostly removed from the well in 1957.

== Church ==
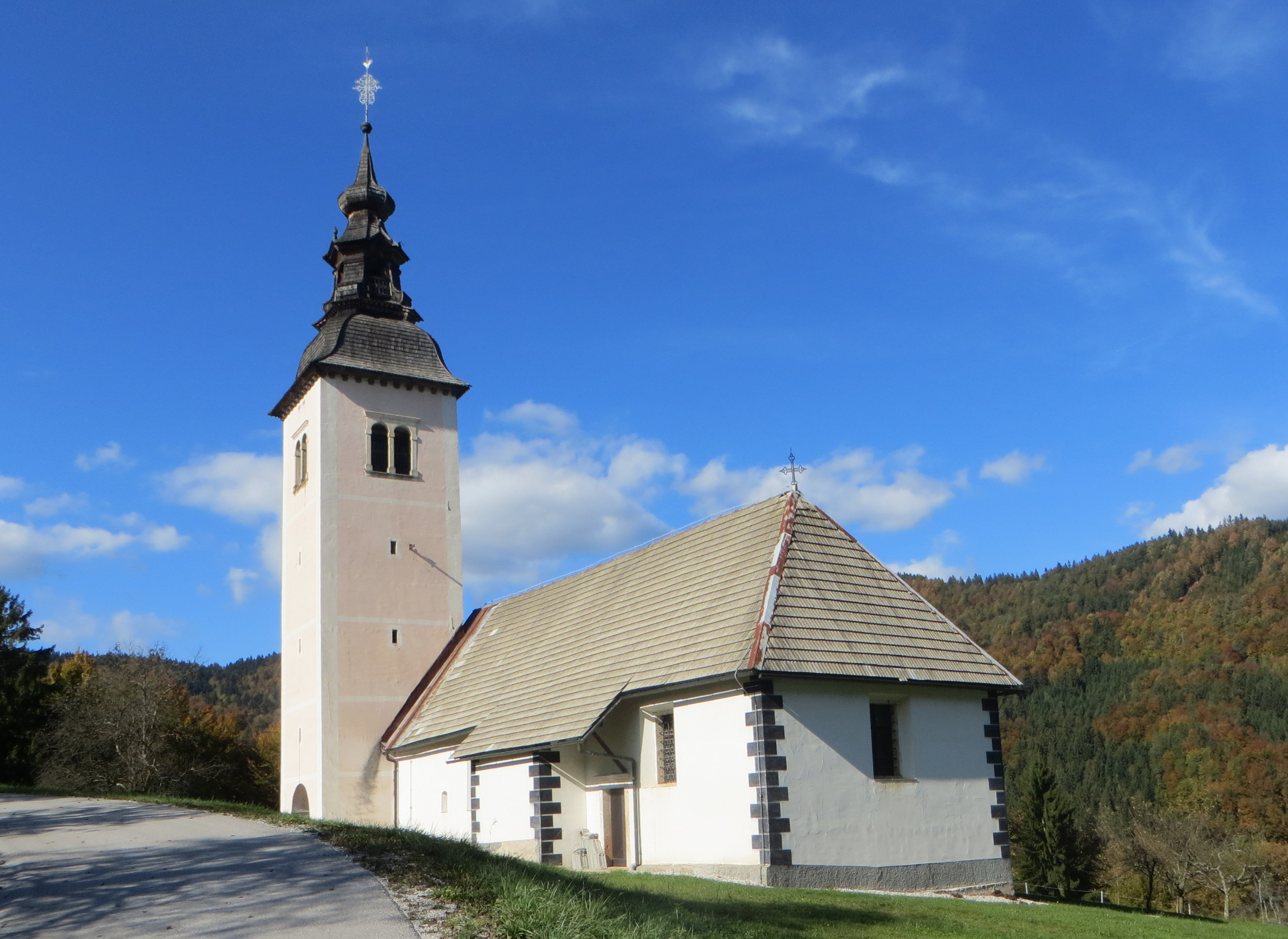
Saint Florian's Church

The local church, built on a hill above the settlement, is dedicated to Saint Florian. It was originally a Romanesque building, dating to the end of the 13th century and rebuilt a number of times. The sanctuary and the belfry are from 1688. Inside a number of frescos from the late 14th century are preserved.
