= Stari Trg, Ivančna Gorica =

Stari Trg
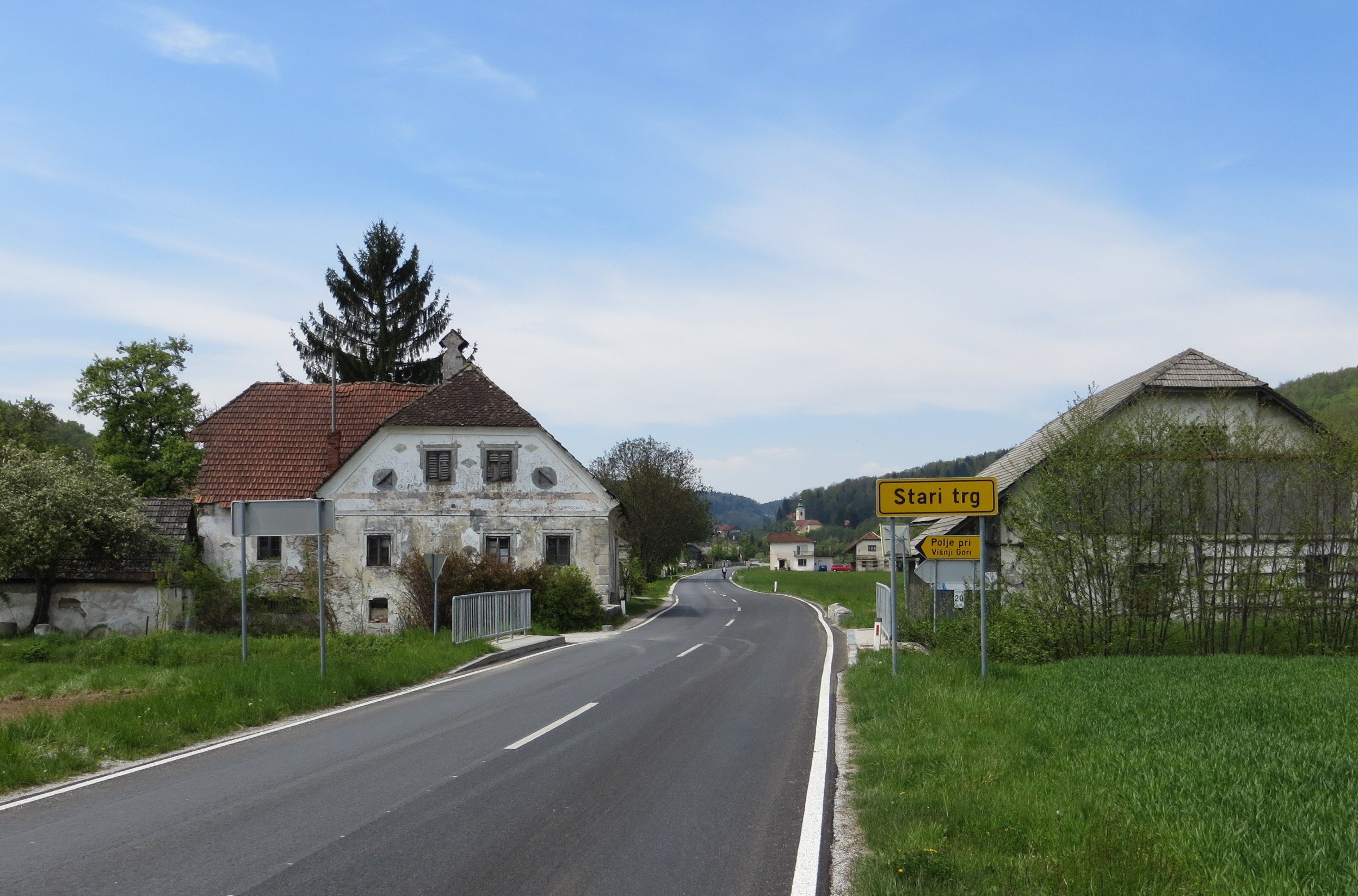

- Location in Slovenia
- Coordinates: 45°57′14.18″N 14°45′18.07″E
- Country: Slovenia
- Traditional region: Lower Carniola
- Statistical region: Central Slovenia
- Municipality: Ivančna Gorica

Area
  - Total: 3.07 km^{2} (1.19 sq mi)
- Elevation: 354.5 m (1,163 ft)

Population (2002)
  - Total: 85

Stari Trg (pronounced [ˈstaːɾi ˈtəɾk]; Slovene: Stari trg, German: Altenmarkt) is a settlement just east of Višnja Gora in the Municipality of Ivančna Gorica in central Slovenia. The area is part of the historical region of Lower Carniola. The municipality is now included in the Central Slovenia Statistical Region.

Numerous finds in the area indicate a possible Roman settlement in the area near what was the Roman road leading from Emona to Neviodunum.
