= Stražišče, Cerknica =

Stražišče
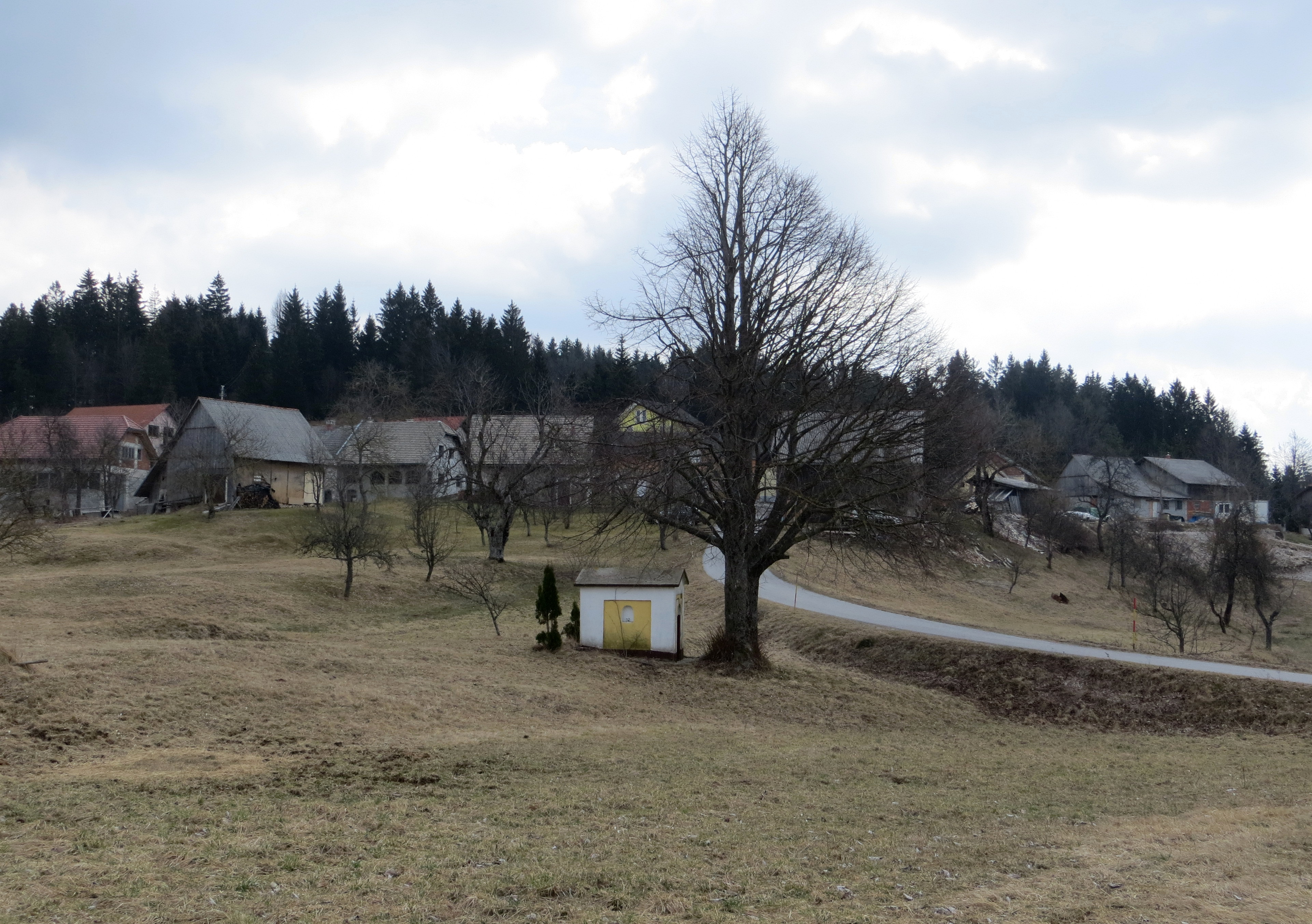

- Location in Slovenia
- Coordinates: 45°50′32.33″N 14°23′56.93″E
- Country: Slovenia
- Traditional region: Inner Carniola
- Statistical region: Littoral–Inner Carniola
- Municipality: Cerknica

Area
  - Total: 1.15 km^{2} (0.44 sq mi)
- Elevation: 887.9 m (2,913 ft)

Population (2020)
  - Total: 19
  - Density: 17/km^{2} (43/sq mi)

Stražišče (pronounced [stɾaˈʒiːʃtʃɛ]) is a small settlement in the hills north of Begunje in the Municipality of Cerknica in the Inner Carniola region of Slovenia.

== Geography ==
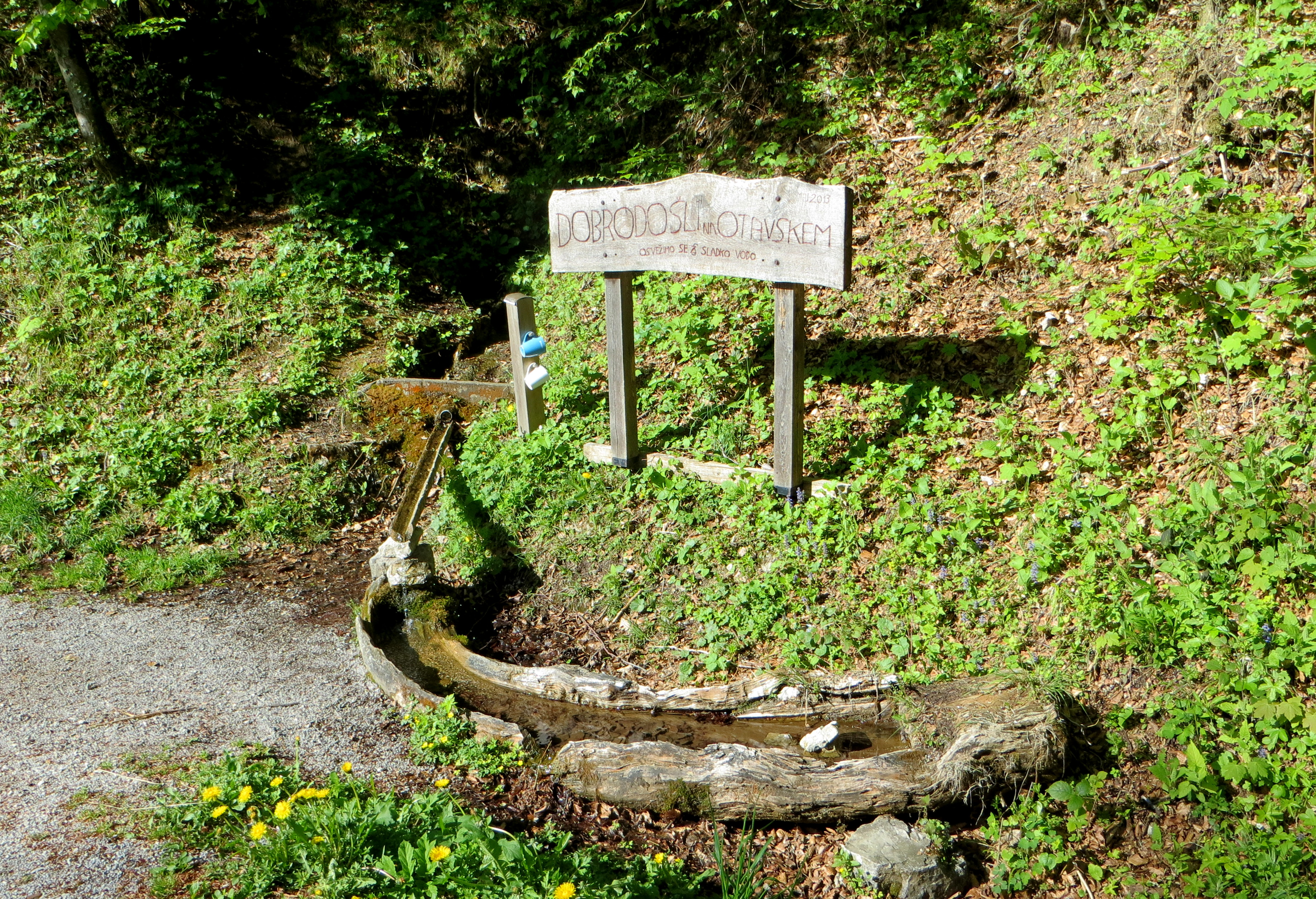
Sladka voda spring

There is a spring known as Sladka voda (literally, 'sweet water, fresh water') in the southeast part of the settlement along the road to Selšček.
