= Studeno =

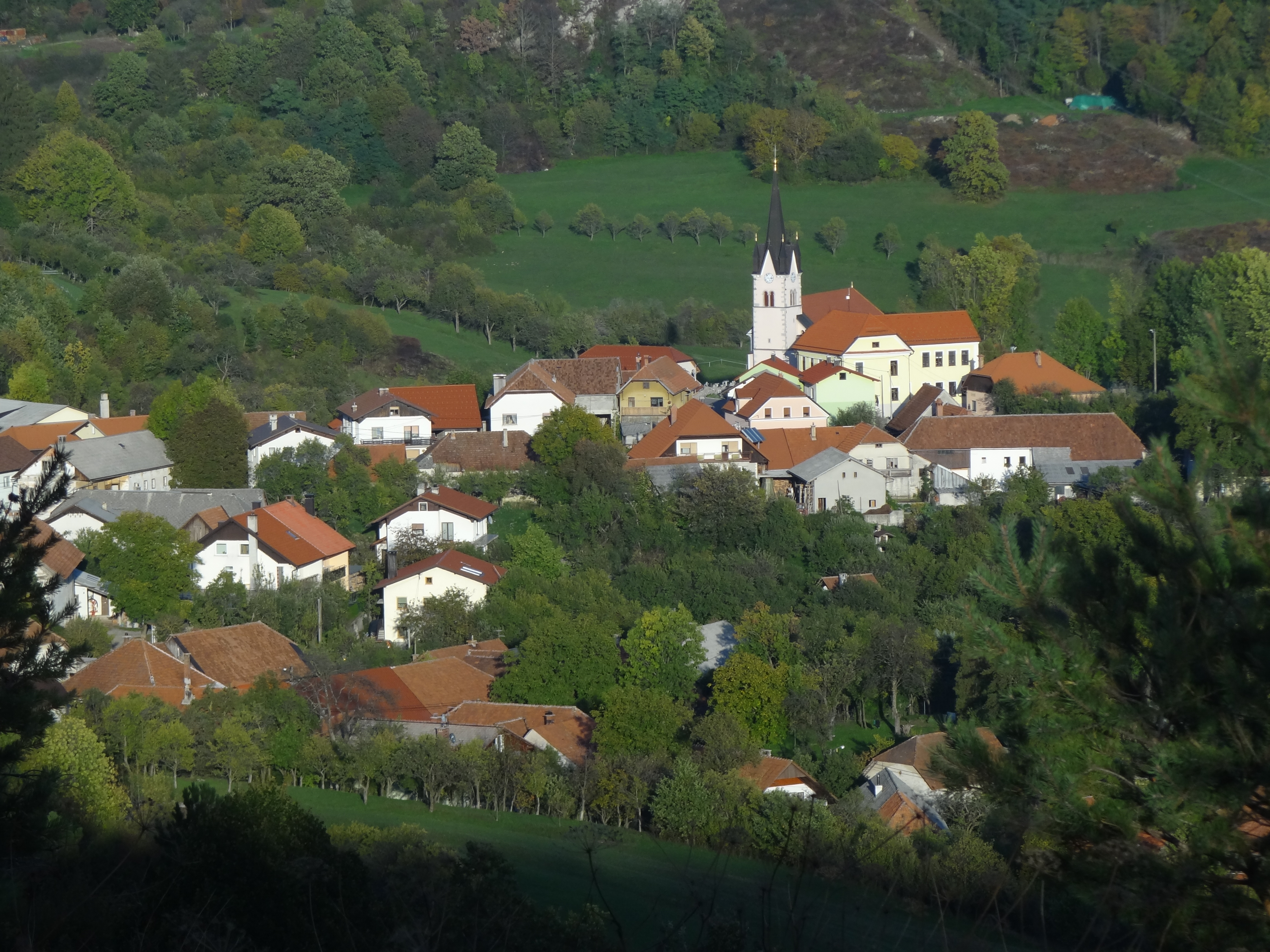

- Location in Slovenia
- Coordinates: 45°49′27.48″N 14°10′44.42″E
- Country: Slovenia
- Traditional region: Inner Carniola
- Statistical region: Littoral–Inner Carniola
- Municipality: Postojna

Area
  - Total: 6.54 km^{2} (2.53 sq mi)
- Elevation: 579.5 m (1,901 ft)

Population (2002)
  - Total: 297

Studeno (pronounced [stuˈdeːnɔ] or [stuˈdɛːnɔ], German: Kaltenfeld) is a village in the hills north of Postojna in the Inner Carniola region of Slovenia.

== Church ==
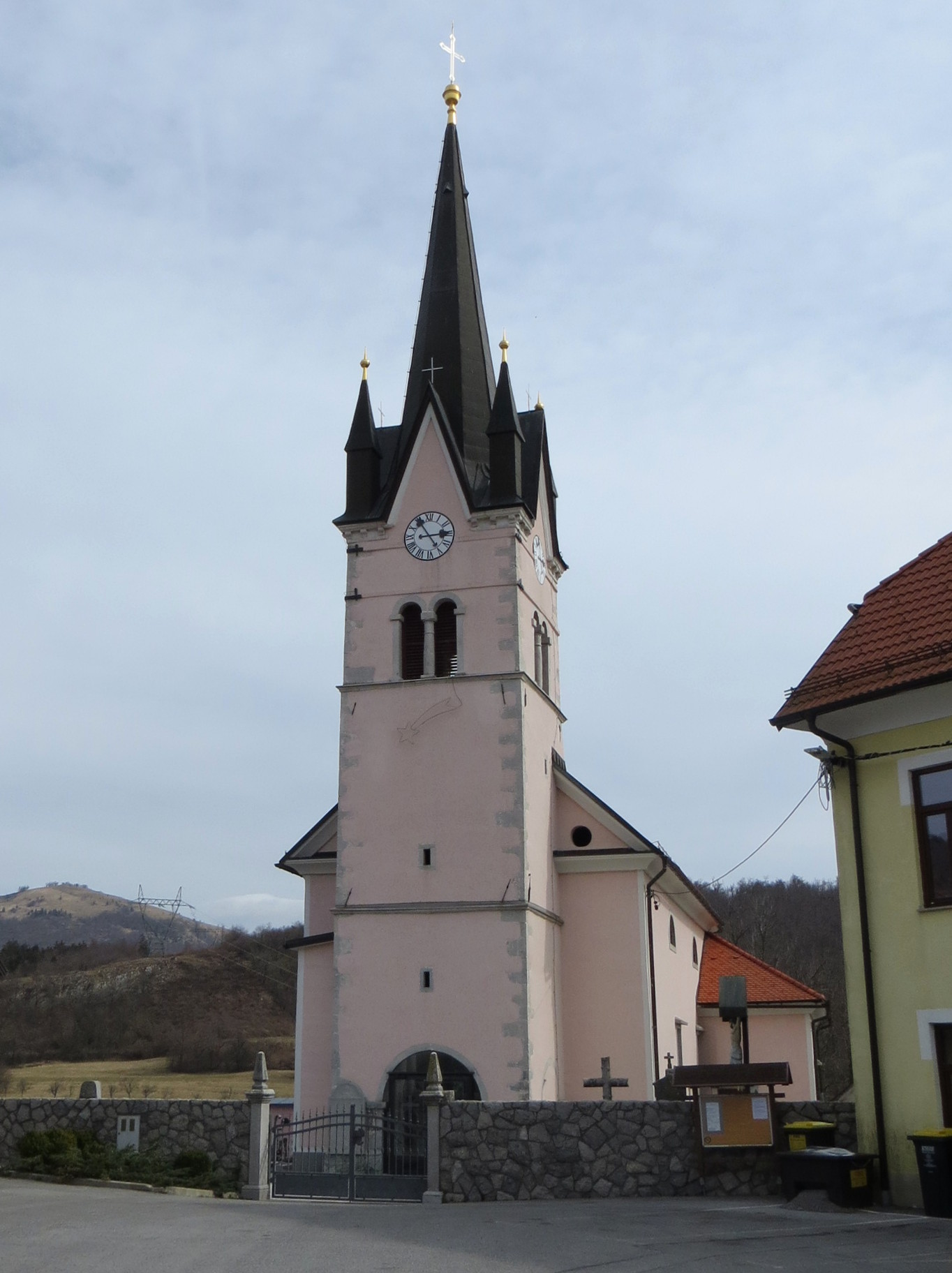
Saint James' Church

The parish church in Studeno is dedicated to Saint James and belongs to the Roman Catholic Diocese of Koper.
