= Skopo, Sežana =

Skopo
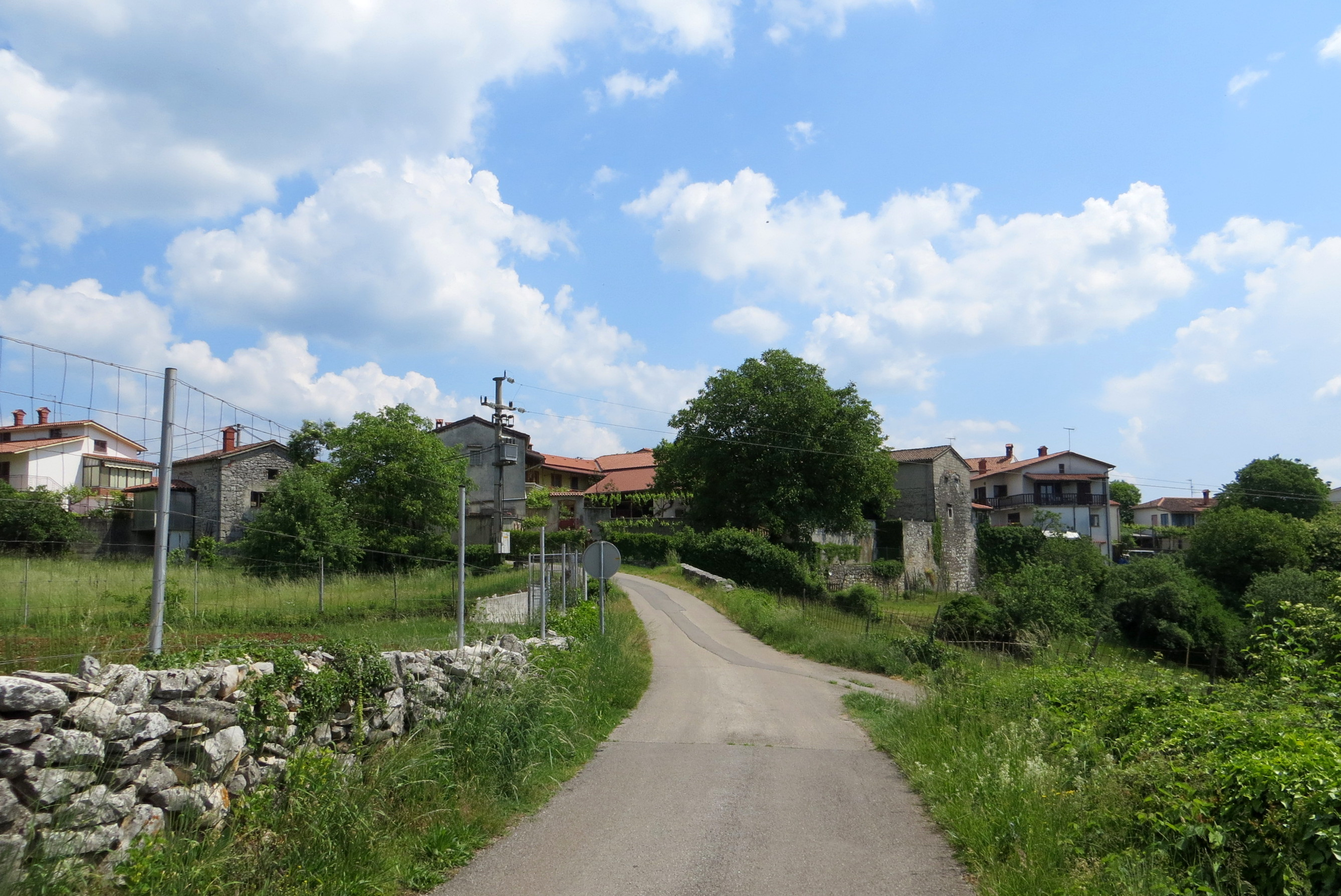

- Location in Slovenia
- Coordinates: 45°46′23.34″N 13°49′24.88″E
- Country: Slovenia
- Traditional region: Littoral
- Statistical region: Coastal–Karst
- Municipality: Sežana

Area
  - Total: 4.31 km^{2} (1.66 sq mi)
- Elevation: 289.2 m (949 ft)

Population (2002)
  - Total: 241

Skopo (pronounced [ˈskoːpɔ]) is a village in the Municipality of Sežana in the Littoral region of Slovenia.

== Church ==
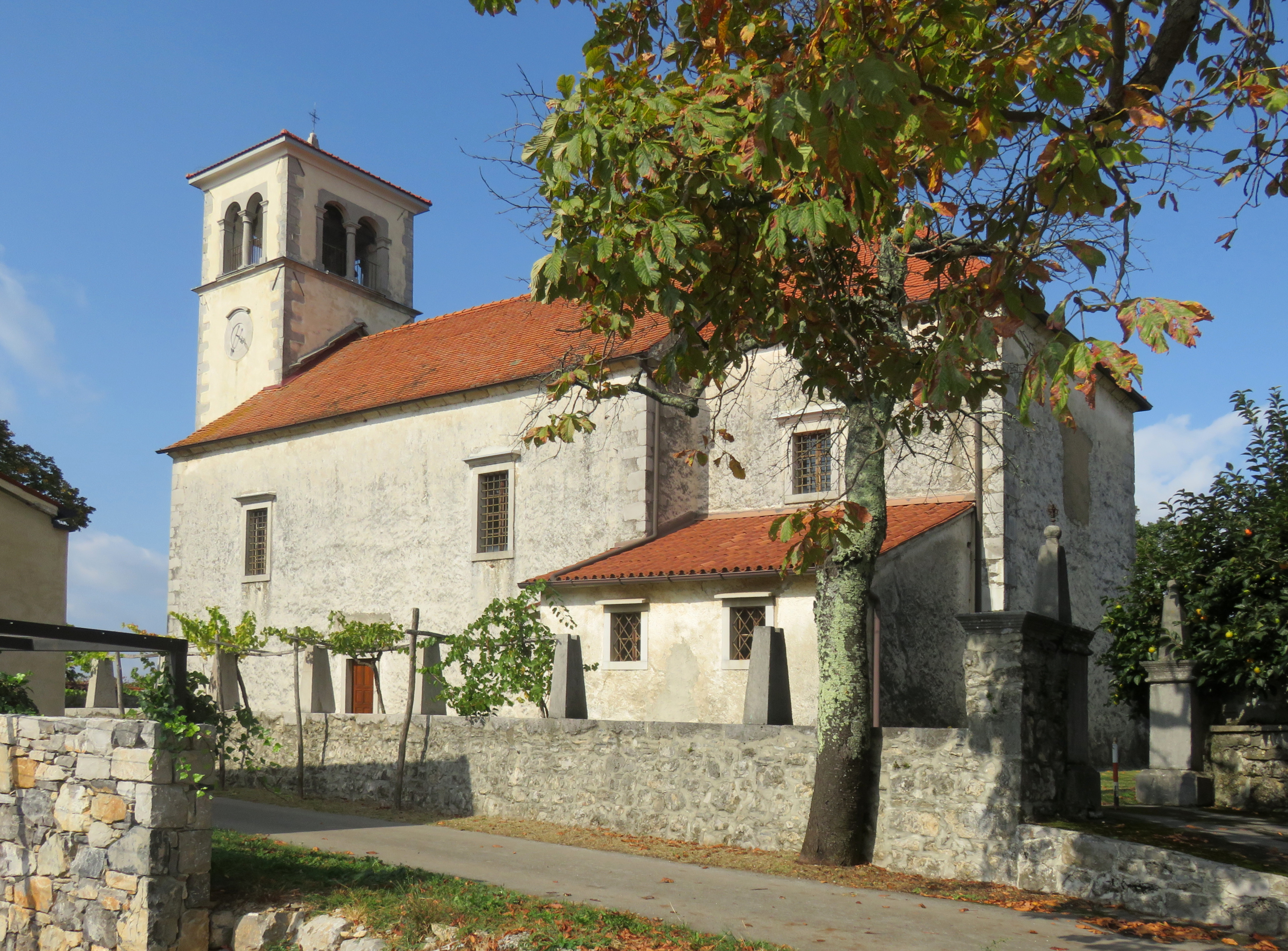
Archangel Michael Church

The parish church in the settlement is dedicated to Saint Michael and belongs to the Diocese of Koper.
