= Stara Lipa, Črnomelj =

Stara Lipa
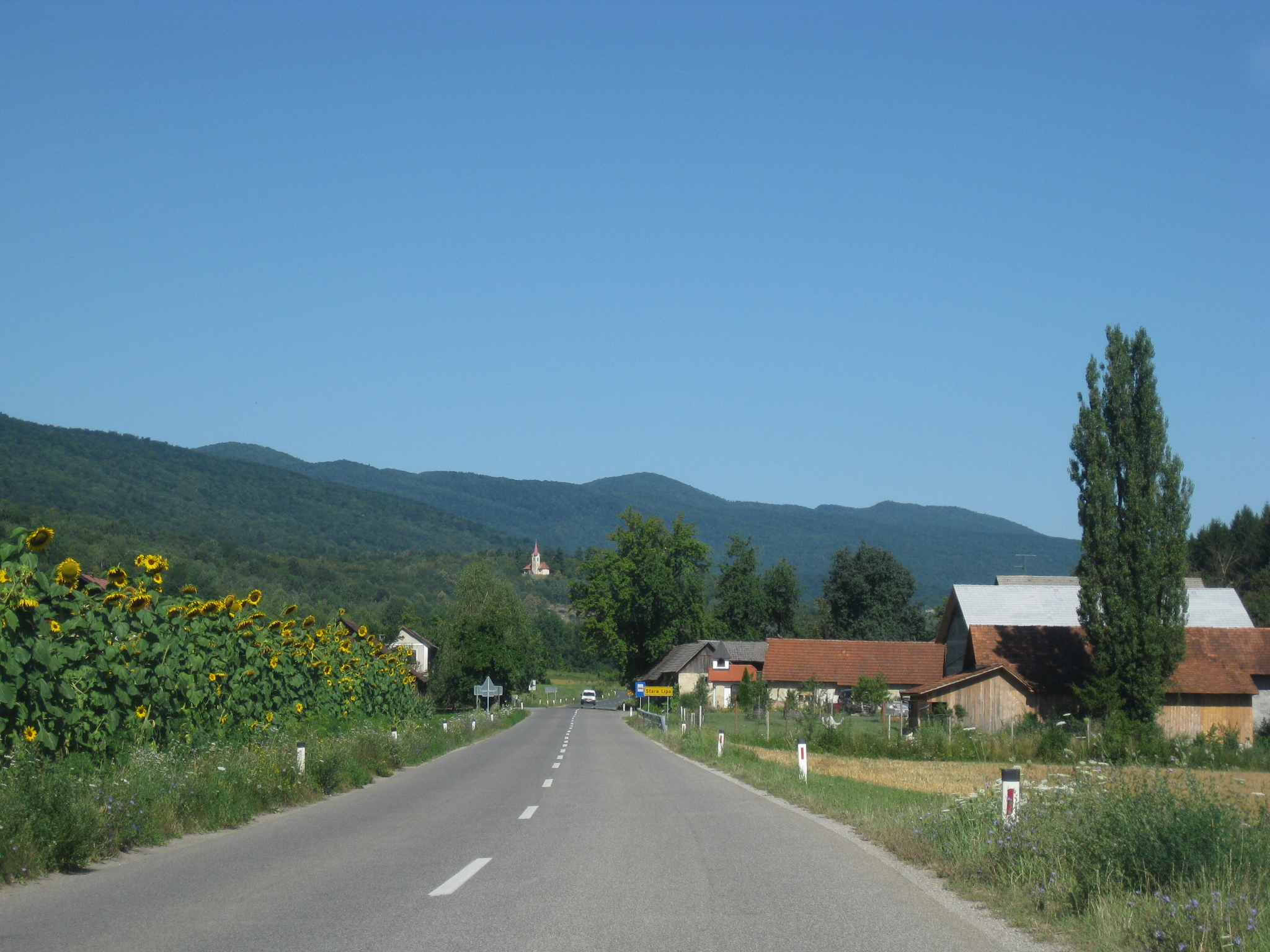

- Location in Slovenia
- Coordinates: 45°28′59.31″N 15°12′6.16″E
- Country: Slovenia
- Traditional region: White Carniola
- Statistical region: Southeast Slovenia
- Municipality: Črnomelj

Area
  - Total: 2.9 km^{2} (1.1 sq mi)
- Elevation: 164.6 m (540 ft)

Population (2020)
  - Total: 88
  - Density: 30/km^{2} (79/sq mi)
- Postal code: 8344

Stara Lipa (pronounced [ˈstaːɾa ˈliːpa]; German: Altlinden) is a settlement on the road from Dragatuš to Vinica in White Carniola in southeastern Slovenia. It belongs to the Municipality of Črnomelj. The area is part of the traditional region of Lower Carniola and is now included in the Southeast Slovenia Statistical Region.
