= Straža, Lukovica =

Straža
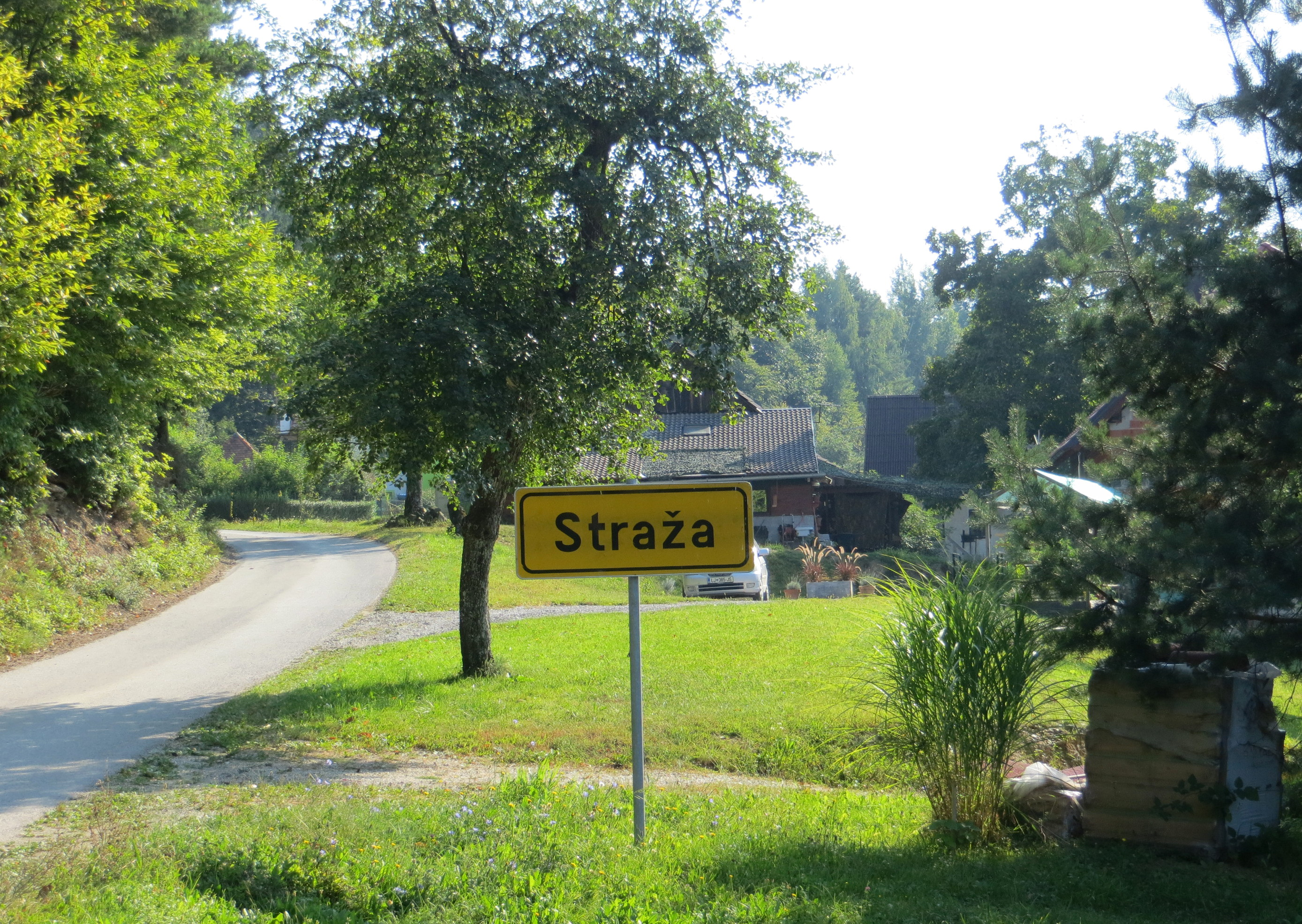

- Location in Slovenia
- Coordinates: 46°11′4.71″N 14°40′58.87″E
- Country: Slovenia
- Traditional region: Upper Carniola
- Statistical region: Central Slovenia
- Municipality: Lukovica

Area
  - Total: 0.96 km^{2} (0.37 sq mi)
- Elevation: 498.3 m (1,635 ft)

Population (2002)
  - Total: 16

Straža (pronounced [ˈstɾaːʒa]) is a small settlement above Rafolče in the Municipality of Lukovica in the eastern part of the Upper Carniola region of Slovenia.
