= Sad, Ivančna Gorica =

Sad
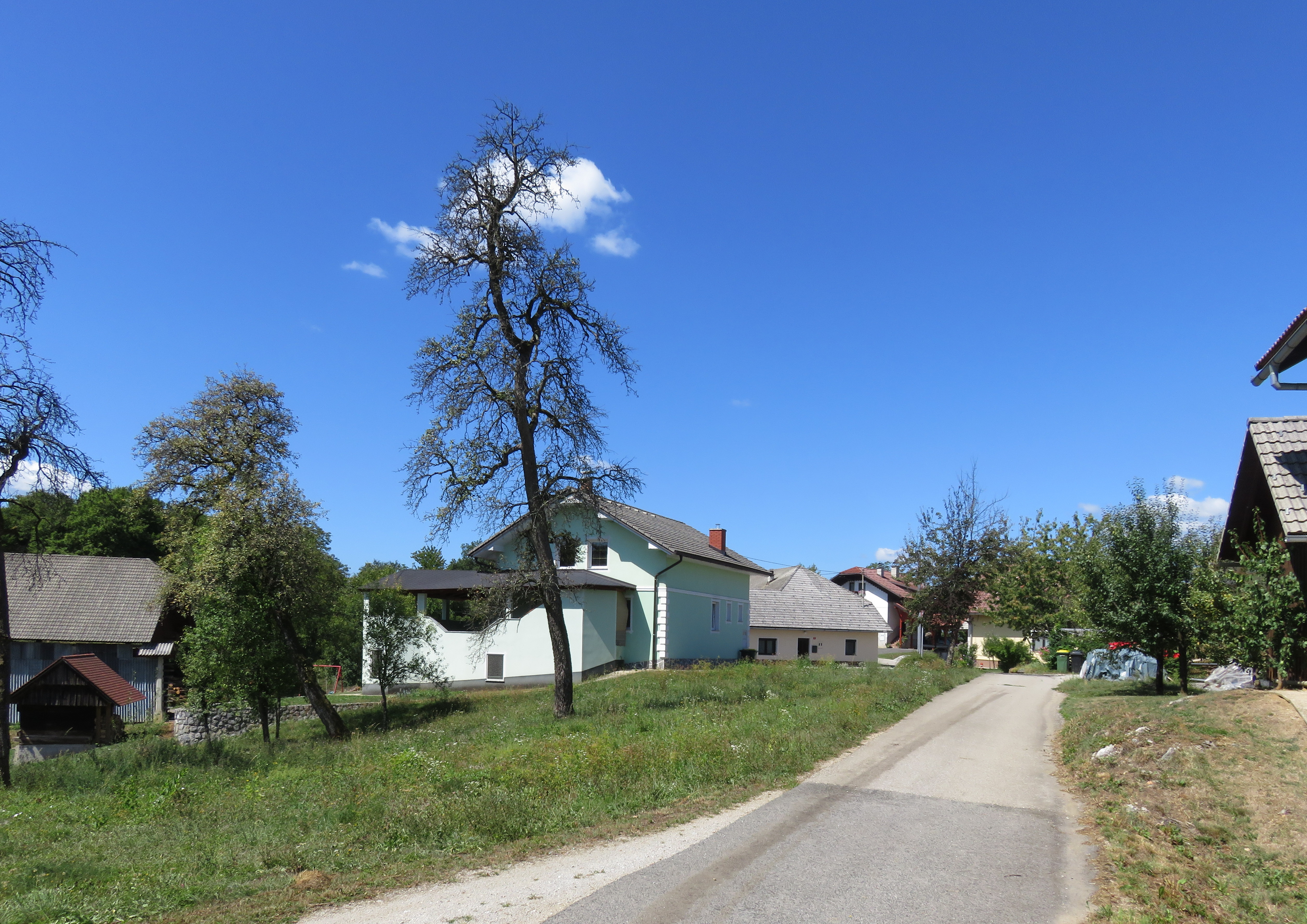

- Location in Slovenia
- Coordinates: 45°54′59.78″N 14°52′9.85″E
- Country: Slovenia
- Traditional region: Lower Carniola
- Statistical region: Central Slovenia
- Municipality: Ivančna Gorica

Area
  - Total: 0.76 km^{2} (0.29 sq mi)
- Elevation: 380.9 m (1,250 ft)

Population (2002)
  - Total: 39

Sad (pronounced [ˈsaːt]) is a small settlement in the hills south of Šentvid pri Stični in the Municipality of Ivančna Gorica in central Slovenia. The area is part of the historical region of Lower Carniola and is included in the Central Slovenia Statistical Region.
