= Stranska Vas, Novo Mesto =

Stranska Vas
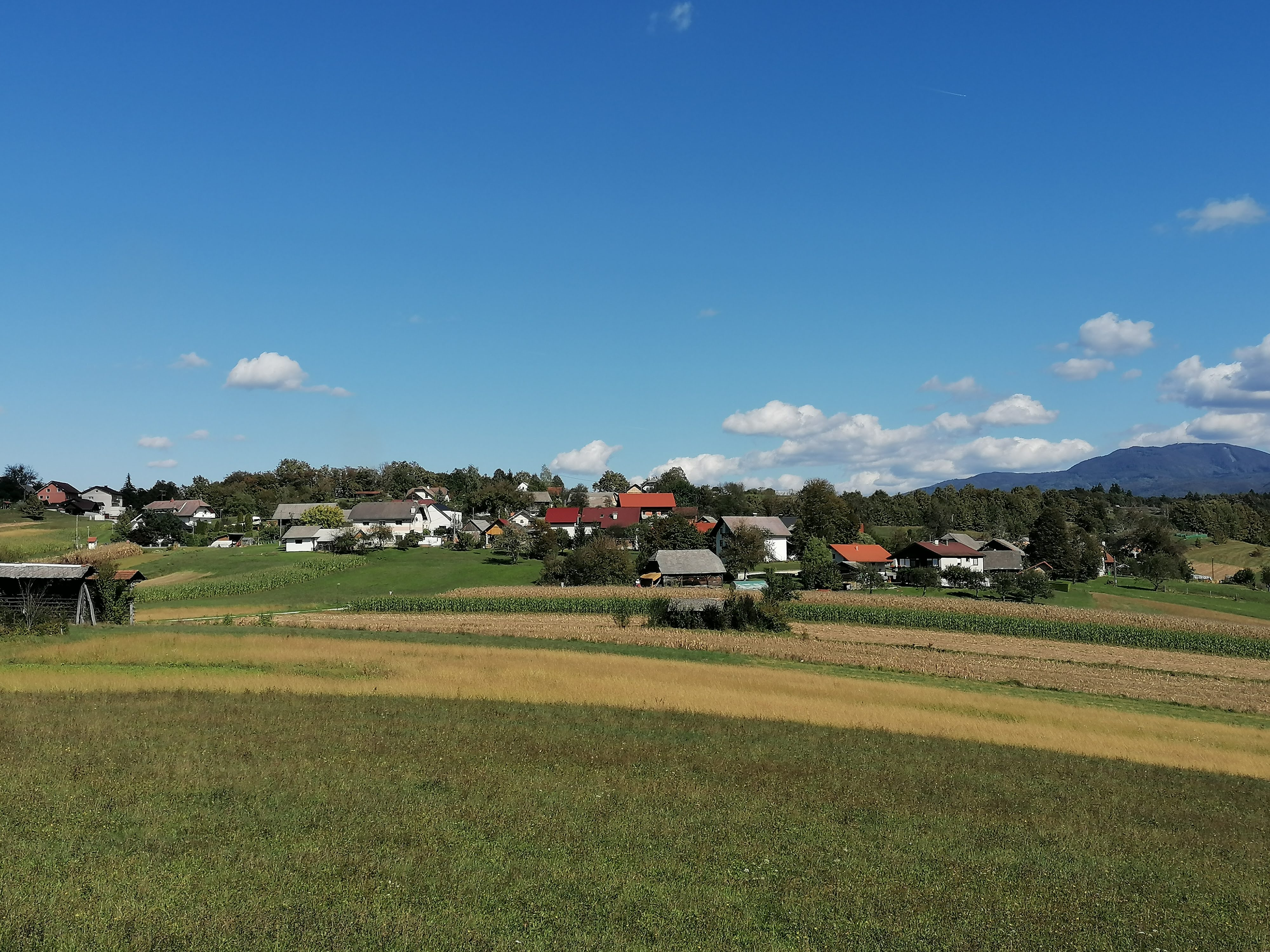

- Location in Slovenia
- Coordinates: 45°45′32.4″N 15°9′55.09″E
- Country: Slovenia
- Traditional region: Lower Carniola
- Statistical region: Southeast Slovenia
- Municipality: Novo Mesto

Area
  - Total: 4.503 km^{2} (1.739 sq mi)
- Elevation: 223.8 m (734 ft)

Population (2026)
  - Total: 457
  - Density: 102/km^{2} (260/sq mi)
- Postal code: 8000

Stranska Vas (pronounced [ˈstɾaːnska ˈʋaːs]; Slovene: Stranska vas) is a settlement in the foothills of the Gorjanci range, south of Novo Mesto in southeastern Slovenia. The area is part of the traditional region of Lower Carniola and is now included in the Southeast Slovenia Statistical Region. In January 2026, the population was 457.

The local church, built on the southern outskirts of the village, is dedicated to Saint Nicholas and belongs to the Parish of Novo Mesto–Šmihel. It was a medieval building that was extensively restyled in the Baroque style in the 17th and 18th centuries with only parts of the nave remaining of the original building.
