= Slavina, Litija =

Slavina
- Village
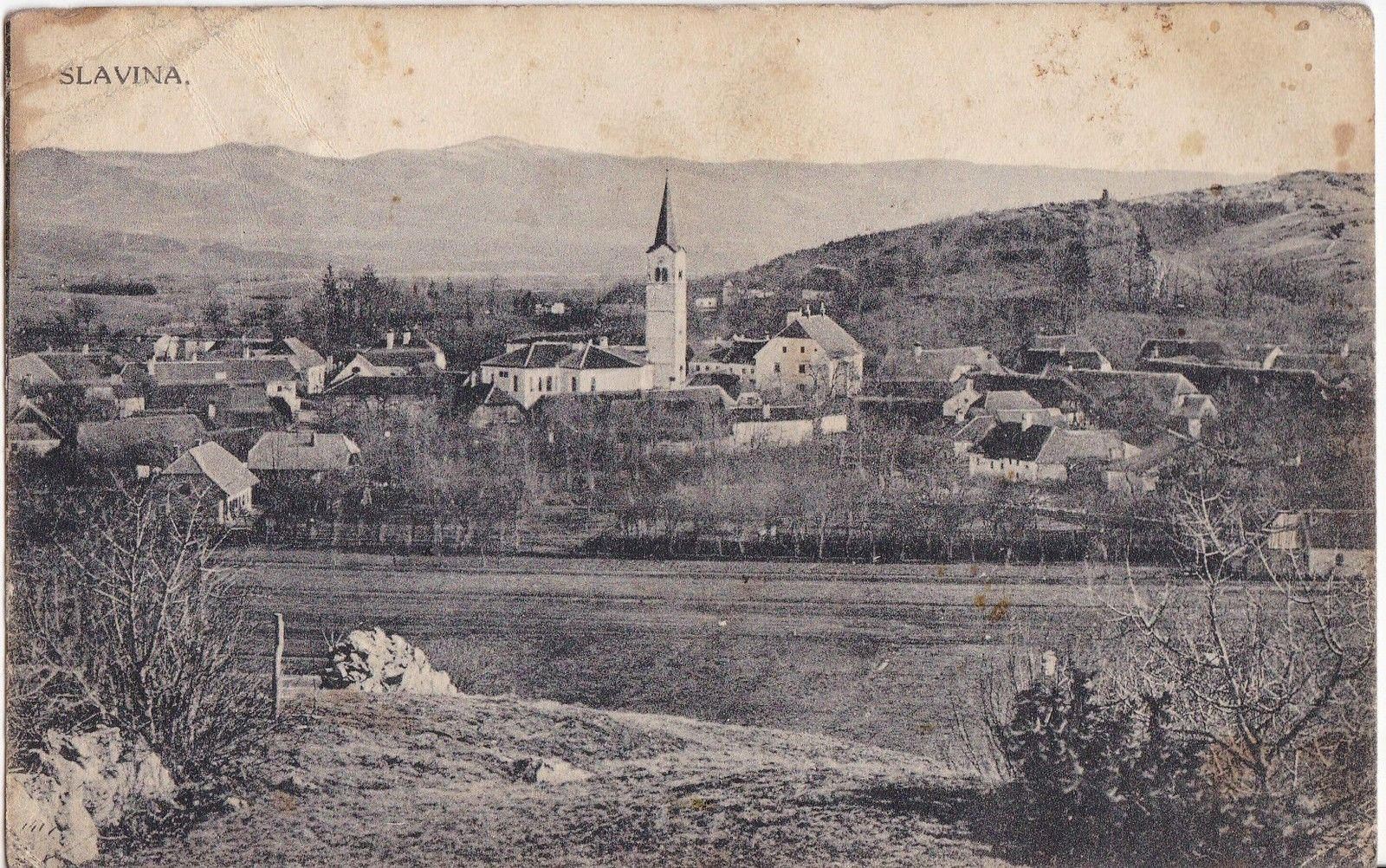
- 1915 postcard of Slavina

- Location in Slovenia
- Coordinates: 46°1′18.99″N 15°2′45.51″E
- Country: Slovenia
- Traditional region: Lower Carniola
- Statistical region: Central Sava
- Municipality: Litija

Area
  - Total: 0.89 km^{2} (0.34 sq mi)
- Elevation: 574.5 m (1,885 ft)

Population (2002)
  - Total: 17
- Postal code: 1273

Slavina (pronounced [ˈslaːʋina]) is a settlement southeast of Dole in the Municipality of Litija in central Slovenia. The area is part of the traditional region of Lower Carniola. It is now included with the rest of the municipality in the Central Sava Statistical Region.
