= Svetinja, Trebnje =

Svetinja
- Location in Slovenia
- Coordinates: 45°52′24″N 15°00′44″E
- Country: Slovenia
- Traditional region: Lower Carniola
- Statistical region: Southeast Slovenia
- Municipality: Trebnje

Area
  - Total: 1.09 km^{2} (0.42 sq mi)
- Elevation: 392.8 m (1,289 ft)

Population (2002)
  - Total: 18

Svetinja (pronounced [sʋɛˈtiːnja]) is a small settlement in the Municipality of Trebnje in eastern Slovenia. It lies in the hills east of Dobrnič in the historical region of Lower Carniola. The municipality is now included in the Southeast Slovenia Statistical Region.
