= Sveti Duh, Bloke =

Sveti Duh Krajič (1955–1989)
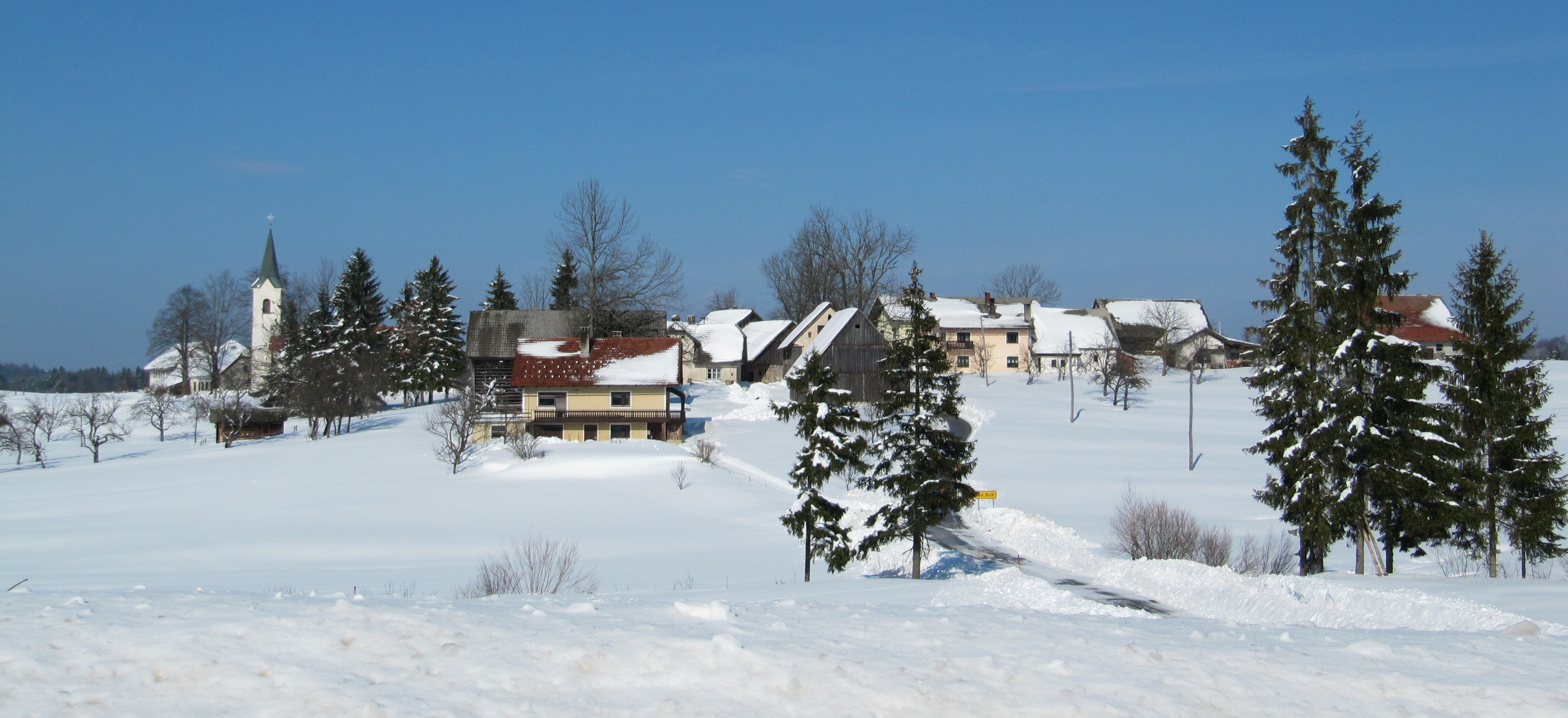

- Location in Slovenia
- Coordinates: 45°47′50.84″N 14°31′23.7″E
- Country: Slovenia
- Traditional region: Inner Carniola
- Statistical region: Littoral–Inner Carniola
- Municipality: Bloke

Area
  - Total: 0.35 km^{2} (0.14 sq mi)
- Elevation: 759.6 m (2,492 ft)

Population (2020)
  - Total: 16
  - Density: 46/km^{2} (120/sq mi)

Sveti Duh (pronounced [ˈsʋeːti ˈduːx], German: Heiligengeist) is a small village north of Nova Vas in the Municipality of Bloke in the Inner Carniola region of Slovenia.

== Name ==
The name of the settlement was changed from Sveti Duh (literally, 'Holy Spirit') to Krajič in 1955. The name was changed on the basis of the 1948 Law on Names of Settlements and Designations of Squares, Streets, and Buildings as part of efforts by Slovenia's postwar communist government to remove religious connotations from toponyms. The name Sveti Duh was restored in 1989.

== Church ==
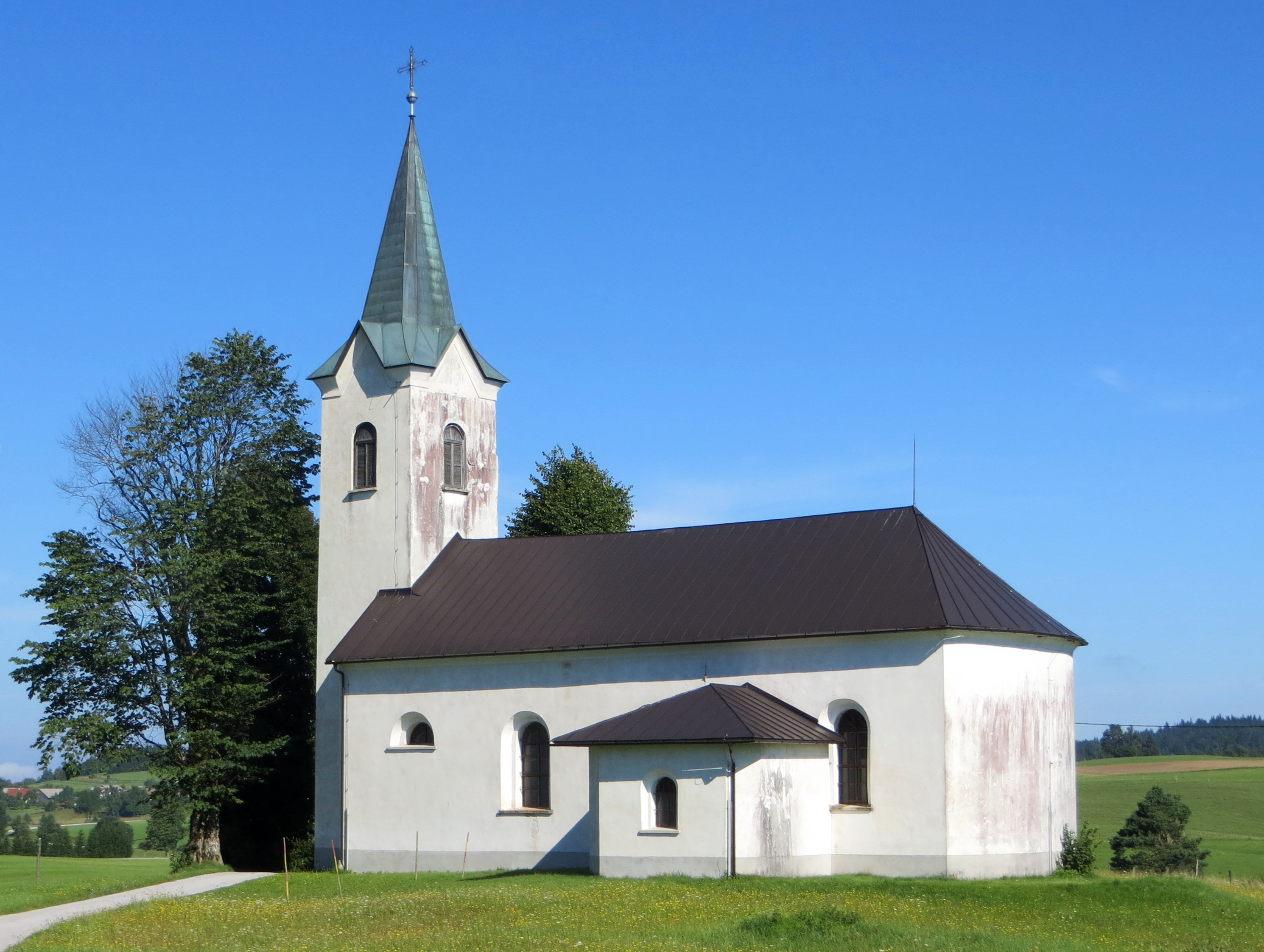
Holy Spirit Church

The local church in the settlement, from which the village gets its name, is dedicated to the Holy Spirit and belongs to the Parish of Bloke.
