= Sveta Trojica, Bloke =

Sveta Trojica Šivče (1955–1991), Trojica (local name)
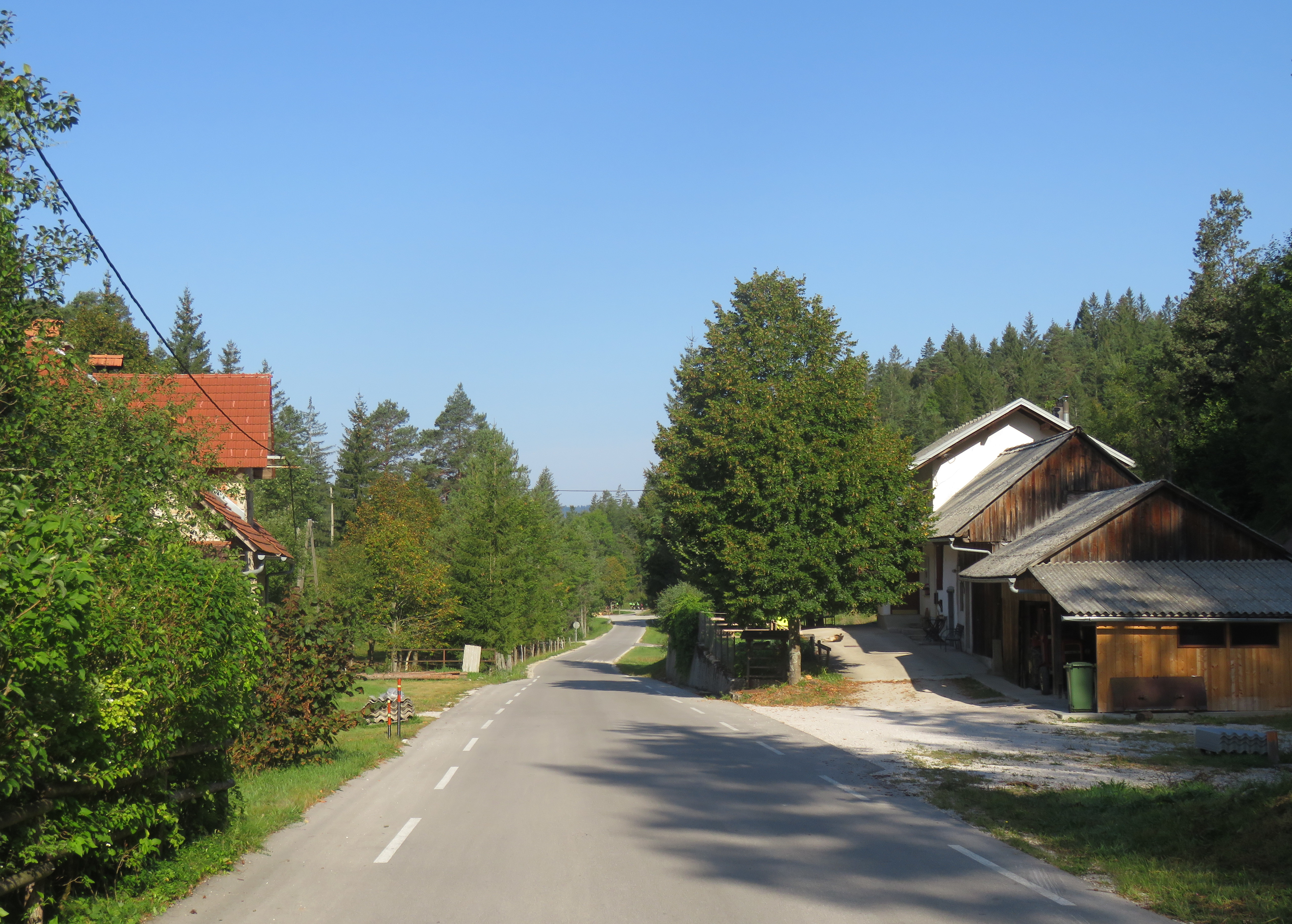
- Sveta Trojica (left)

- Location in Slovenia
- Coordinates: 45°48′40.98″N 14°28′38.84″E
- Country: Slovenia
- Traditional region: Inner Carniola
- Statistical region: Littoral–Inner Carniola
- Municipality: Bloke

Area
  - Total: 0.84 km^{2} (0.32 sq mi)
- Elevation: 738.3 m (2,422 ft)

Population (2020)
  - Total: 6
  - Density: 7.1/km^{2} (18/sq mi)

Sveta Trojica (pronounced [ˈsʋeːta tɾɔˈjiːtsa], in older sources Žilče pri Sveti Trojici, German: Schilze bei Heiligendreifaltigkeit) is a small village north of Velike Bloke in the Municipality of Bloke in the Inner Carniola region of Slovenia.

== Name ==
The name of the settlement was changed from Sveta Trojica (literally, 'Holy Trinity') to Šivče in 1955. The name was changed on the basis of the 1948 Law on Names of Settlements and Designations of Squares, Streets, and Buildings as part of efforts by Slovenia's postwar communist government to remove religious elements from toponyms. The name Sveti Trojica was restored in 1991. Locally, the settlement is known as Trojica.

== Church ==
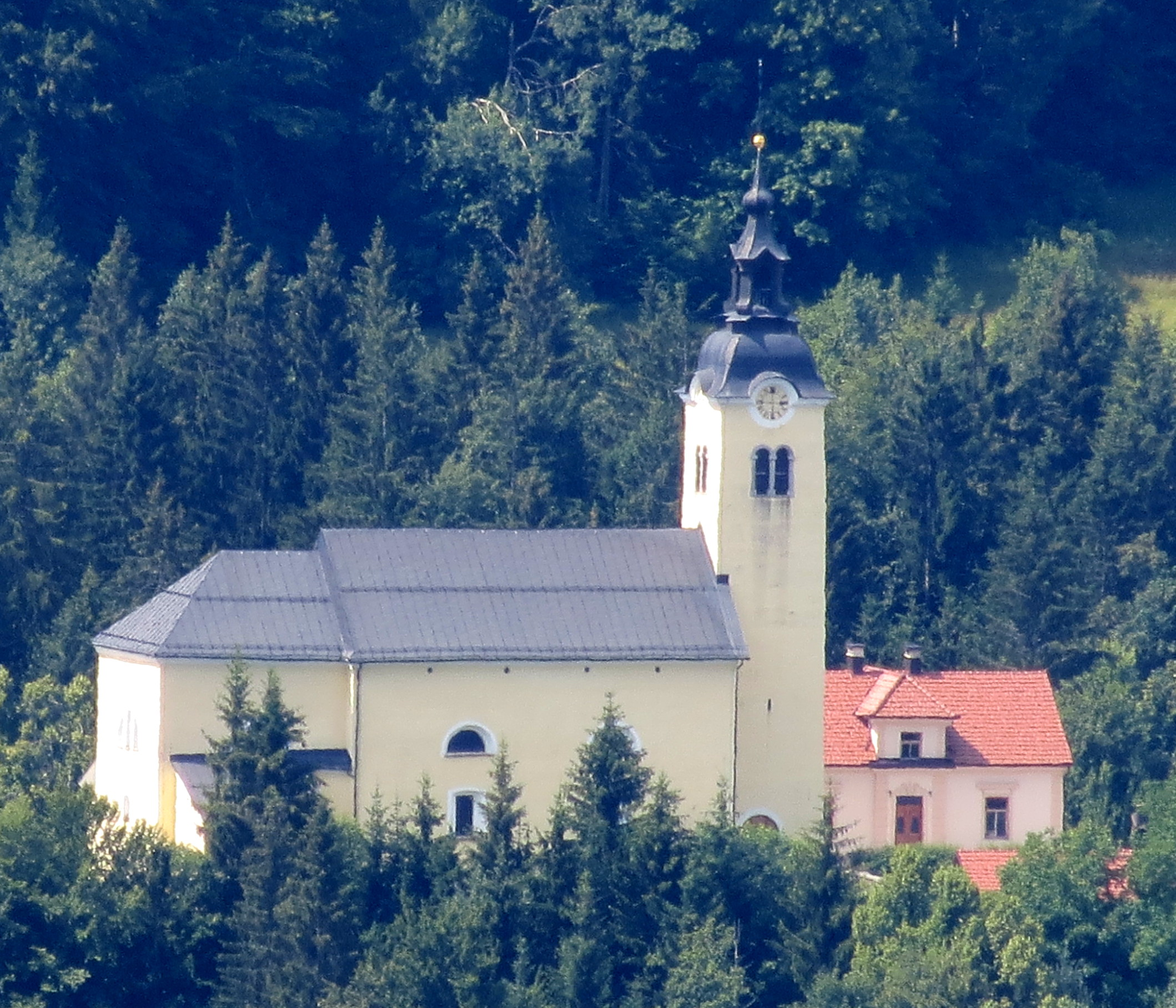
Holy Trinity Church

The parish church in the settlement, from which the village gets its name, is dedicated to the Holy Trinity and belongs to the Roman Catholic Archdiocese of Ljubljana.
