= Stolnik, Kamnik =

Stolnik
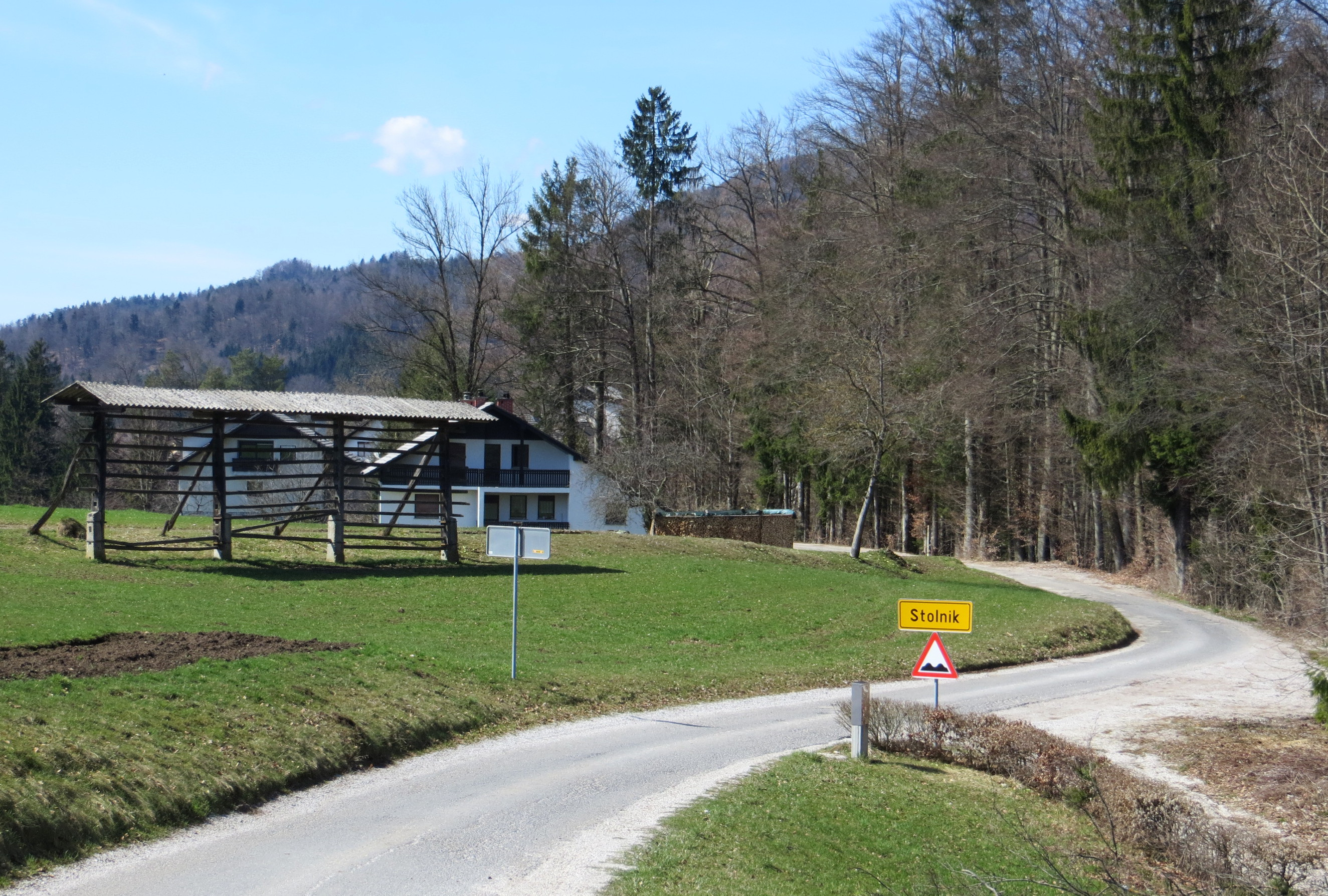

- Location in Slovenia
- Coordinates: 46°15′2.04″N 14°35′21.81″E
- Country: Slovenia
- Traditional region: Upper Carniola
- Statistical region: Central Slovenia
- Municipality: Kamnik

Area
  - Total: 1.35 km^{2} (0.52 sq mi)
- Elevation: 471.3 m (1,546 ft)

Population (2002)
  - Total: 120

Stolnik (pronounced [stɔu̯ˈniːk]; German: Stounig) is a small village in the Tunjice Hills (Slovene: Tunjiško gričevje) in the Municipality of Kamnik in the Upper Carniola region of Slovenia.
