= Suša, Lukovica =

Suša
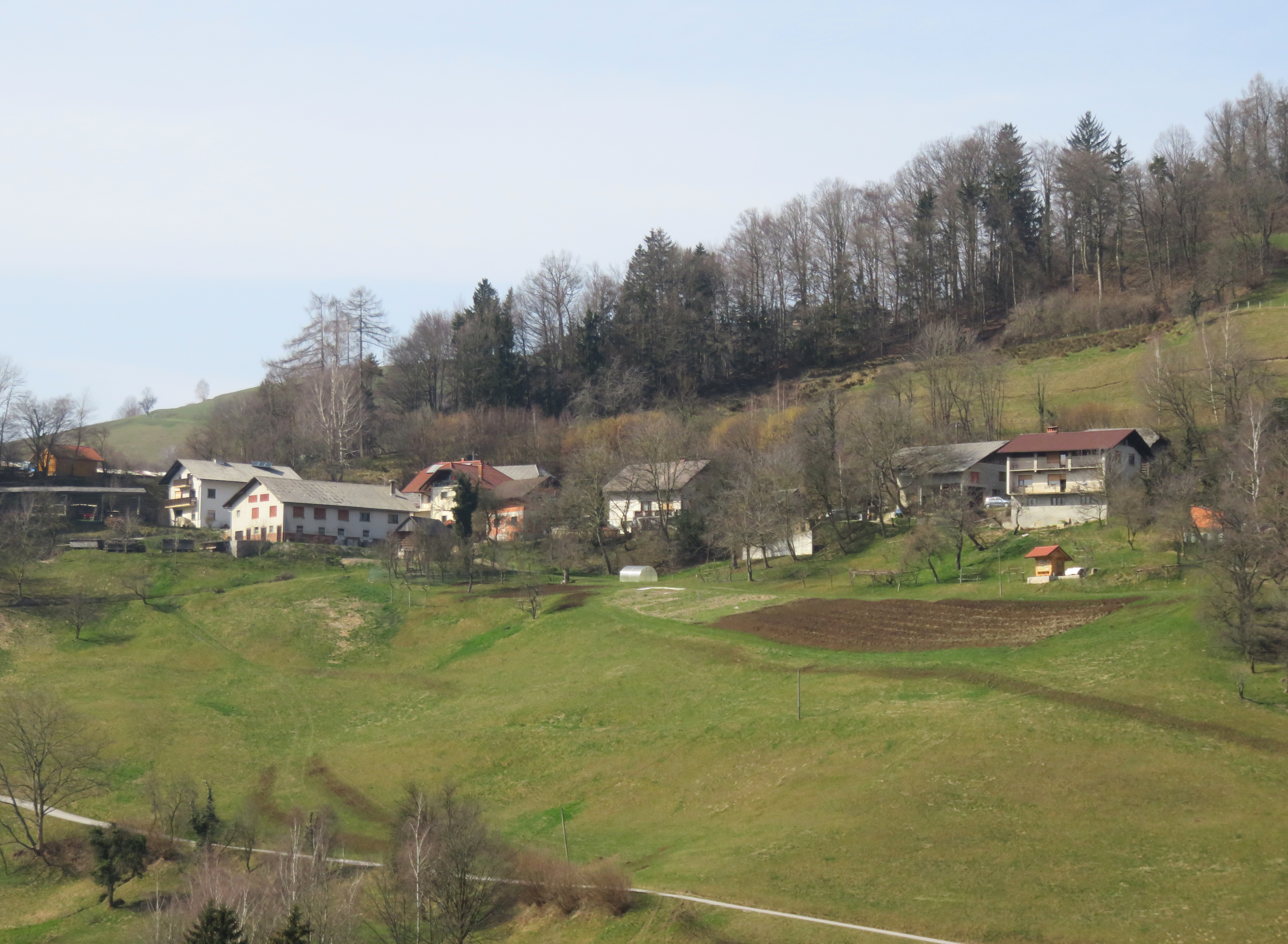

- Location in Slovenia
- Coordinates: 46°11′17.78″N 14°49′25.74″E
- Country: Slovenia
- Traditional region: Upper Carniola
- Statistical region: Central Slovenia
- Municipality: Lukovica

Area
  - Total: 0.55 km^{2} (0.21 sq mi)
- Elevation: 619.4 m (2,032 ft)

Population (2002)
  - Total: 29

Suša (pronounced [ˈsuːʃa]) is a small settlement northeast of Blagovica in the Municipality of Lukovica in the eastern part of the Upper Carniola region of Slovenia.
