= Sava, Litija =

Sava
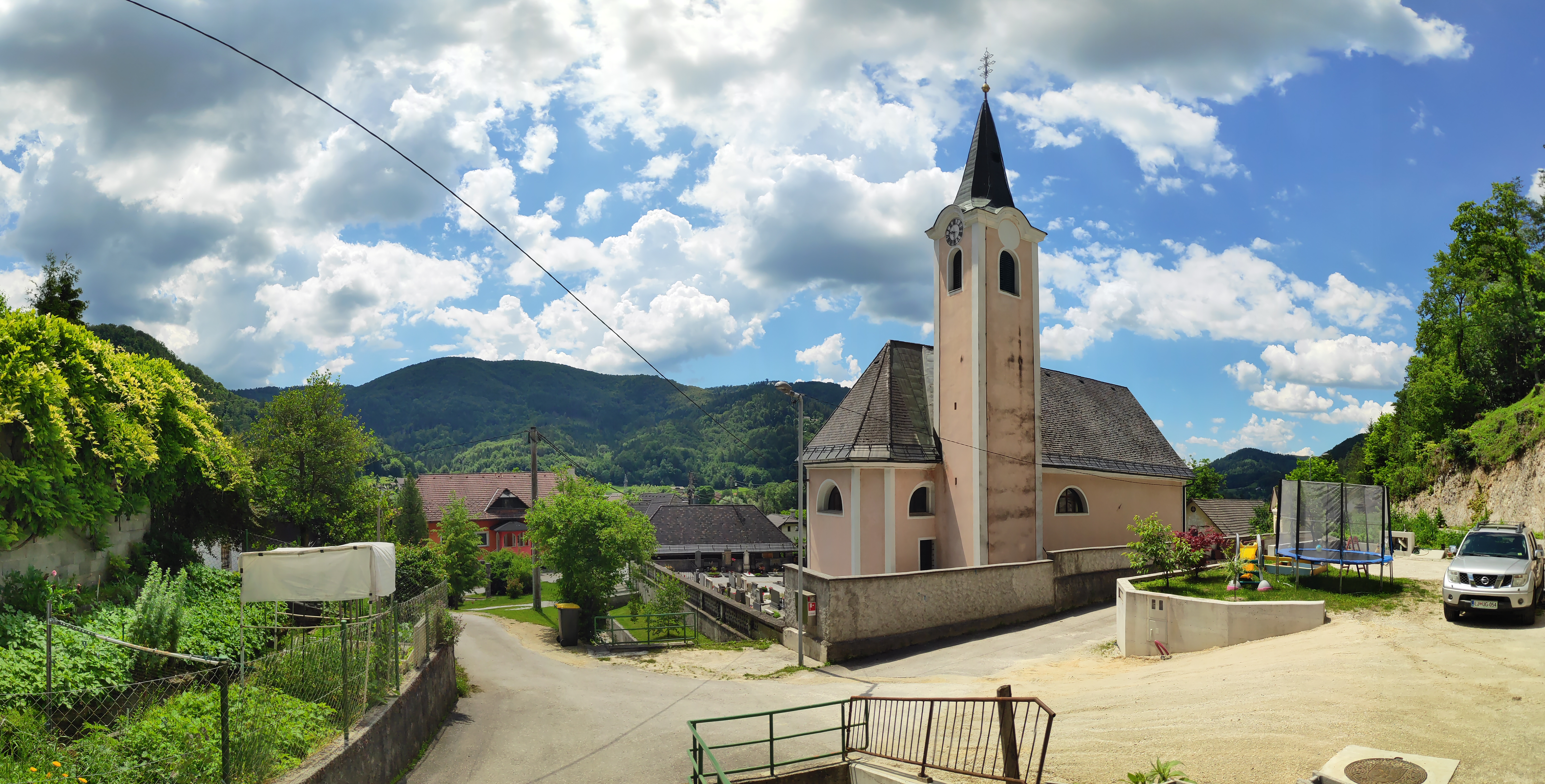
- Sava with Saint Nicholas's Church

- Location in Slovenia
- Coordinates: 46°5′18.12″N 14°53′31.41″E
- Country: Slovenia
- Traditional region: Upper Carniola
- Statistical region: Central Slovenia
- Municipality: Litija

Area
  - Total: 1.53 km^{2} (0.59 sq mi)
- Elevation: 235.9 m (774 ft)

Population (2002)
  - Total: 253
- Postal code: 1282

Sava (pronounced [ˈsaːʋa], German: Sawa, sometimes Sava bei Littai) is a settlement on the left bank of the Sava River (from which it gets its name) in central Slovenia. It lies in the Municipality of Litija. The area is part of the traditional region of Upper Carniola. It is now included with the rest of the municipality in the Central Sava Statistical Region.

== Church ==
The parish church in the settlement is dedicated to Saint Nicholas and belongs to the Roman Catholic Archdiocese of Ljubljana. It was built in 1736 on the site of an earlier church and extended in 1844.
