= Podolševa =

Podolševa Sveti Duh (until 1953)
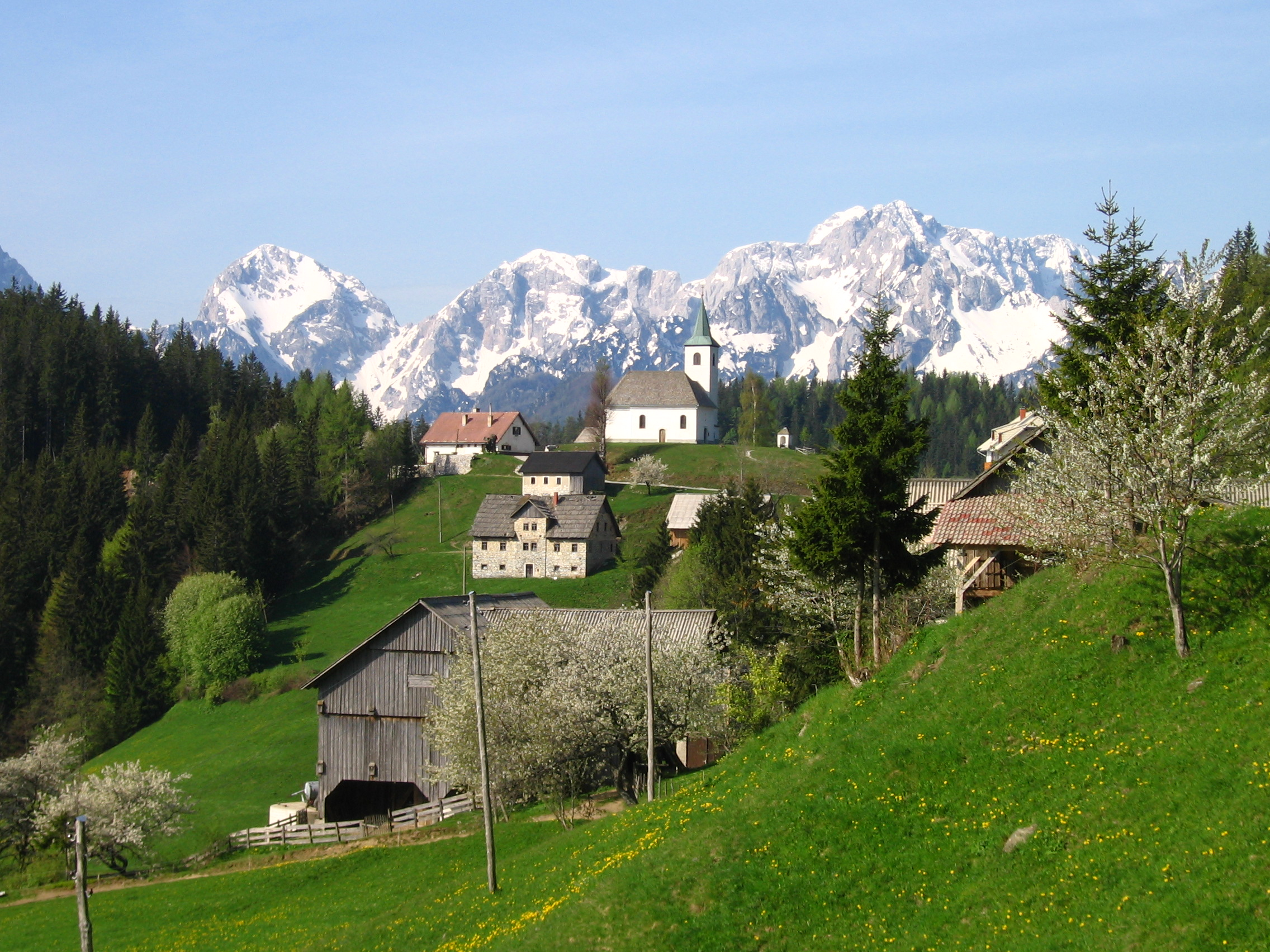

- Location in Slovenia
- Coordinates: 46°26′11.5″N 14°41′43.6″E
- Country: Slovenia
- Traditional region: Styria
- Statistical region: Savinja
- Municipality: Solčava

Area
  - Total: 19.16 km^{2} (7.40 sq mi)
- Elevation: 1,064 m (3,491 ft)

Population (2002)
  - Total: 71

Podolševa (pronounced [pɔˈdoːu̯ʃɛʋa] or [pɔˈdoːlʃɛʋa]; formerly Sveti Duh, German: Heiligengeist) is a dispersed settlement in the Municipality of Solčava in northern Slovenia. The area belongs to the traditional region of Styria and is now included in the Savinja Statistical Region.

== Geography ==
The territory of the settlement includes Potok Cave (Slovene: Potočka zijalka), named after the Potok Farm. The archaeologist Srečko Brodar carried out excavations at Potok Cave. The Bukovnik farm in the eastern part of the settlement, which lies at an elevation of 1,327 meters (4,354 ft), is the highest-elevation farm in Slovenia.

== Name ==
The name of the settlement was changed from Sveti Duh (literally, 'Holy Spirit'), referring the local church, to Podolševa in 1953. The name was changed on the basis of the 1948 Law on Names of Settlements and Designations of Squares, Streets, and Buildings as part of efforts by Slovenia's postwar communist government to remove religious elements from toponyms. The name Podolševa is a fused prepositional phrase that has lost its case inflection, from pod 'below' + Olševa, thus referring to the settlement's location below Mount Olševa. In the past the German name was Heiligengeist.

== Church ==
The local church is dedicated to the Holy Spirit and belongs to the Parish of Solčava. It was first mentioned in written documents dating to 1631.
