= Brodar (surname) =

Brodar is a Slovene surname. Notable people with the surname include:

- Mitja Brodar (1921–2012), Slovene paleontologist, son of Srečko
- Nejc Brodar (born 1982), Slovene cross-country skier
- Srečko Brodar (1893–1987), Slovene archaeologist
