= Mitja Brodar =

Slovenian archaeologist (1921–2012)

Mitja (Demetrij) Brodar (13 January 1921 – 16 February 2012) was a Slovenian paleontologist. He was a son of Srečko Brodar, a pioneer of the study of the Paleolithic period in Slovenia. In the 1960s and 1970s Brodar, together with France Osole, led Paleolithic research in Slovenia.

== Life ==
He was born in 1921 in Celje, where his father was teaching science at Celje High School No. 1.

During the Second World War, in the Italian-annexed Province of Ljubljana, he joined the Slovene Partisans. He was captured in 1942 and sent to the Italian concentration camps in Rab, Rijeka, and Visco.

== Education and work ==
Brodar studied civil engineering at the University of Ljubljana, at the wish of his father; he graduated in 1949. Later he also studied geology and paleontology, and he graduated in 1953. In 1952 he became a member of the Ljubljana Cave Exploration Society (DZRJL). Between 1954 and 1956 and in 1960 he excavated Mokrica Cave (Slovene: Mokriška jama). He received PhD in 1959 with a thesis on those excavations. Betal Rock Shelter (Betalov spodmol) is another site he excavated.

He helped establish the Slovene archaeological association and served as its president during the 1970s. Together with his father, he wrote a book on the excavations at Potok Cave (Slovene: Potočka zijalka).

=== Divje Babe flute ===
Brodar disputed the characterization of the Divje Babe flute, believing that it was not a musical artifact and that Neanderthals did not make such artifacts.

=== Research volume ===
Brodar published a synthesis of his research in an open-access Slovenian–German bilingual research volume, Stara kamena doba v Sloveniji / Altsteinzeit in Slowenien (The Paleolithic in Slovenia; 2009, Ljubljana, 717 pp.).
