= Ana Mayer Kansky =

Slovenian chemist and chemical engineer

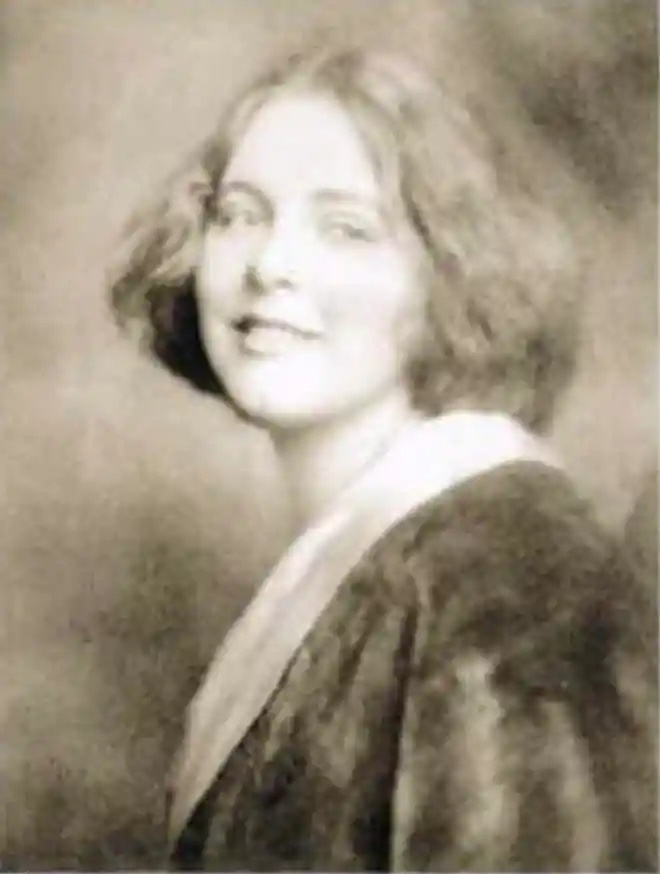
- Ana Mayer during her student years
- Born: Ana Mayer; 20 June 1895; Lože
- Died: 3 November 1962 (aged 67); Podgrad, SR Slovenia, Socialist Federal Republic of Yugoslavia
- Education: University of Vienna; University of Ljubljana
- Spouse: Evgen Kansky
- Children: 3
- Scientific career
- Fields: chemistry, chemical engineering
- Thesis: O učinkovanju formalina na škrob (1920)
- Doctoral advisor: Maks Samec

Ana Mayer Kansky (20 June 1895 – 3 November 1962) was a Slovene chemist and chemical engineer noted for being the first person to obtain a doctoral degree at the University of Ljubljana and one of the first female scientists from Slovenia.

== Early life and education ==
Ana Mayer was born to the Slovene landowner Karl Mayer von Leitenburg from Lože in the Vipava Valley and Ana Dejak, daughter of a wealthy entrepreneur from Senožeče. She attended primary school in Vipava, then a lyceum for girls in Ljubljana, finishing her basic education at the Ljubljana Classical Gymnasium in 1914 as one of the first girls allowed to attend this institution. Excelling in science, she wished to continue her studies at the University of Vienna, but her father had promised his mother on her deathbed that he would not send Ana to college. To bypass this promise, he suggested Ana raise tuition money herself, which she did by organizing picking and sales of apricots from the family plantation. She went on to study chemistry, with physics as a minor, at the Philosophical Faculty in Vienna (1914–1918).

In Vienna, Mayer lived modestly, with frequent food shortages due to the war. She was hosted by an Austrian baroness who nevertheless gave her plenty of freedom, so the apartment became a meeting spot for Slovene students at the time. They were supported by the family of literary historian Ivan Prijatelj who lived in Vienna, and after a while, a social circle emerged with Mayer, Marij Kogoj, Srečko Brodar, Milko Kos, and others. She also met a representative of the Austrian Littoral, who arranged her visitor access to the Austrian parliament. She would often listen to speeches there, and was present at the announcement of the May Declaration (1917) calling for more autonomy of South Slavic nations within Austria-Hungary, as well as other events signalling the dissolution of the monarchy.

Due to circumstances foreshadowing the state's dissolution after the first World War, the University of Vienna enacted a decree dismissing Slavic students in 1918, so Mayer had to interrupt her studies and return to Ljubljana. Next year, she resumed the study under professor Maks Samec at the newly established University of Ljubljana and on 15 July 1920, she defended her doctoral thesis (O učinkovanju formalina na škrob – On the effect of formalin on starch) to become the first holder of doctoral degree at that university. According to a 1978 study published by the University of Padua, she was the 72nd woman in the world to obtain a doctoral degree. Results of her doctoral research were published in the German journal Kolloidchemische Beihefte with Samec as a co-author. Her careful experiments shed light on a hot issue in organic chemistry at the time – whether formalin could dissolve starch or not. She proved that formalin could not, but formic acid as a common impurity could.

== Career ==
Mayer went on to become the first female member of the academic staff at the university, first as a research assistant a few months before obtaining her PhD, then continuing with research at the university's Institute of Chemistry. Four additional scientific papers with her authorship were published in the next two years. In 1921, she married Evgen Kansky, a professor at the Medical Faculty. The couple had three children, Aleksej, Evgen, and Nuša. She resigned in 1922 for reasons unclear – either due to the lack of funds, her marriage or her first pregnancy.

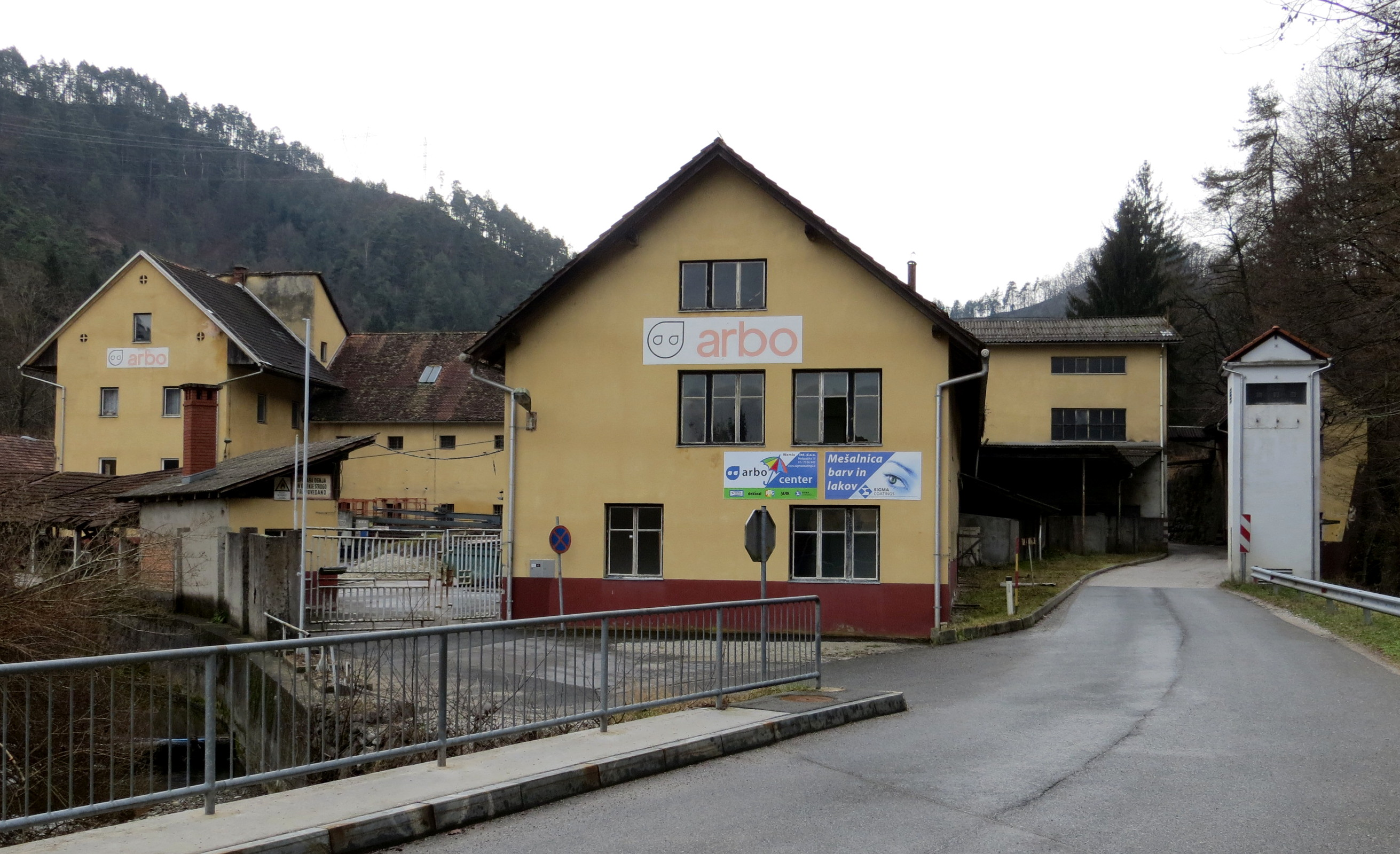
The former Kansky factory in Podgrad (later Arbo factory, abandoned since 1995)

In 1922, the couple opened the first Yugoslavian factory for producing sulphuric ether and other chemical products in Podgrad, near Ljubljana. She managed the company Dr. A. Kansky herself while her husband kept a chemical laboratory. In 1929, they purchased the abandoned facilities of the former factory Osterberger Ölfabrik bei Laibach in Podgrad and renovated them, as well as ruins of a nearby fortress where they built a cottage. They electrified both properties. Soon, they started producing complex organic compounds from domestic raw materials, mostly various esters for solvents.

The family also kept a house on Krek Square in Ljubljana where they had offices and a laboratory, as well as a shop. Their venture ended during World War II when the Nazi authorities seized the factory, after which it was nationalized by the Yugoslavian government and continued operation under the name Tovarna kemičnih izdelkov Arbo (Arbo Chemical Products Factory). Mayer Kansky's husband was forced to retire, while she spent the remaining years of her career as a chemistry teacher.

The Arbo factory employed 60 people at its peak. In the 1980s, it mainly produced desiccants, which achieved 80% on the Yugoslavian market. After Slovenia's independence, the factory was denationalised – returned to the Mayer Kansky descendants, and in 1995, it ceased operations due to poor management, outdated plants, and an obsolete product range.
