= Divje Babe flute =

Disputed oldest known musical instrument

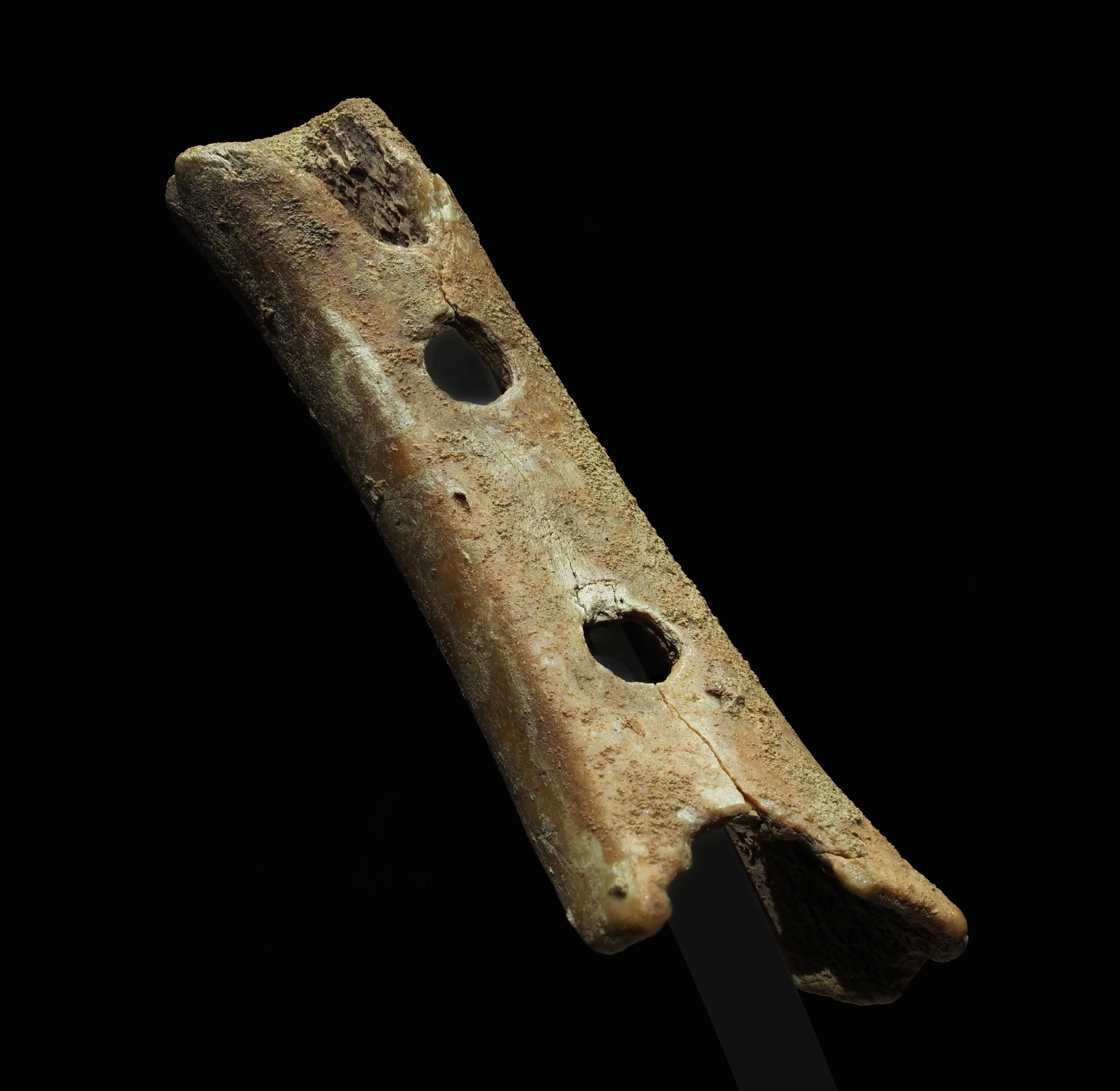
- The artifact as displayed in the museum
- Material: Bone
- Length: 11.2 cm (4.4 in)
- Created: Middle Paleolithic (50000 - 60000 BP)
- Discovered: 1995 Divje Babe cave, Slovenia
- Present location: National Museum of Slovenia, Ljubljana

The Divje Babe flute, also called tidldibab, is a cave bear femur pierced by spaced holes that was unearthed in 1995 during systematic archaeological excavations led by the Institute of Archaeology of the Research Centre of the Slovenian Academy of Sciences and Arts, at the Divje Babe I near Cerkno in northwestern Slovenia. It has been suggested that it was made by Neanderthals as a form of musical instrument, and became known as the Neanderthal flute. The artifact is on prominent public display in the National Museum of Slovenia in Ljubljana as a Neanderthal flute. As such, it would be the world's oldest known musical instrument.

This claim was met with severe criticism and dispute within the scientific community. There are no other known instances of a Neanderthal musical instrument, and such a find from the Middle Paleolithic (Mousterian) might indicate previously unknown symbolic behavior among Neanderthals.

== Site ==
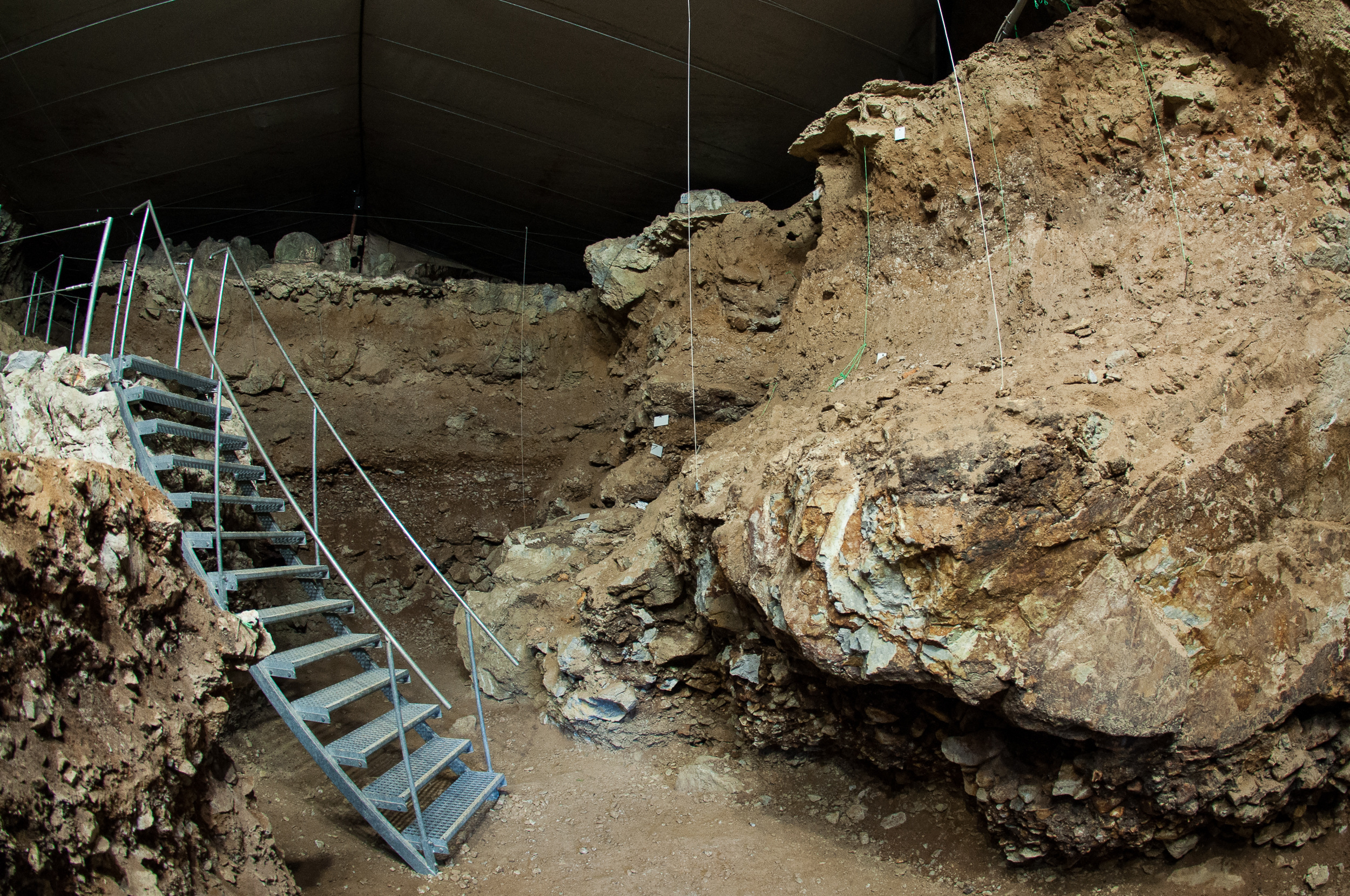
Excavation in Divje Babe I Cave

The location of the site is a horizontal cave, 45 metres (148 ft) long and up to 15 metres (49 ft) wide; it is 230 m (750 ft) above the Idrijca River, near Cerkno, and is accessible to visitors. Researchers working at the site have uncovered more than 600 archaeological items in at least ten levels, including twenty hearths and the skeletal remains of cave bears. According to the museum's statements, the flute has been associated with the "end of the middle Pleistocene" and with Neanderthals, about 55,000 years ago.

The cave site's excavation was led by Mitja Brodar from 1978 to 1986, and again from 1989 to 1995 by Ivan Turk and Janez Dirjec.

== Neanderthal flute ==
The bone was discovered in a 1995 expedition led by Ivan Turk. When it was found, he proposed that it was either a musical artifact or a gnawed bone pierced with teeth, favouring the former.

As described by Turk and his colleagues, the Neanderthal musical instrument from Divje babe I would be the oldest known musical instrument. He believes it is currently the strongest material evidence of Neanderthal musical behaviour. It is at least 10,000 years older than the earliest Aurignacian wind instruments discovered in the German caves Hohle Fels, Geißenklösterle and Vogelherd. The Neanderthal musical instrument is on display at the National Museum of Slovenia in Ljubljana.

Whether the artifact is actually a flute created by Neanderthals is the subject of debate, and many believe the holes in the bone are not of artificial origin. Archeologist Mitja Brodar, who worked at the site before Turk, was very skeptical that the bone was of Neanderthal origin. Many others have suggested it could have been produced by animals biting or chewing the bone, and consider a carnivore origin more likely.

The National Museum of Slovenia maintains that evidence presented by Turk in 2005 had "finally refuted hypotheses that the bone was perforated because of a bear bite". The manufacture by Neanderthals "is reliably proven" and its significance in the understanding of their capabilities and the development of music and speech is secure. An experimental reconstruction by Ljuben Dimkaroski demonstrated that a plausible original shape of the bone can be used as a practical musical instrument (see reconstruction below).

The dating of the bone, the presence of Neanderthals at the site, as well as the presence of carnivorous animals, are generally agreed upon. The primary dispute is whether it is more likely to be a Neanderthal made flute, or simply the product of a carnivore's chewing. Debate focuses on the following three questions:

- Were the holes produced by carnivore teeth?
- Were the holes produced by tools?
- Could the shape of the artifact occur from random chewing, or does it demonstrate musical function so well that it must have been designed?

=== Description ===
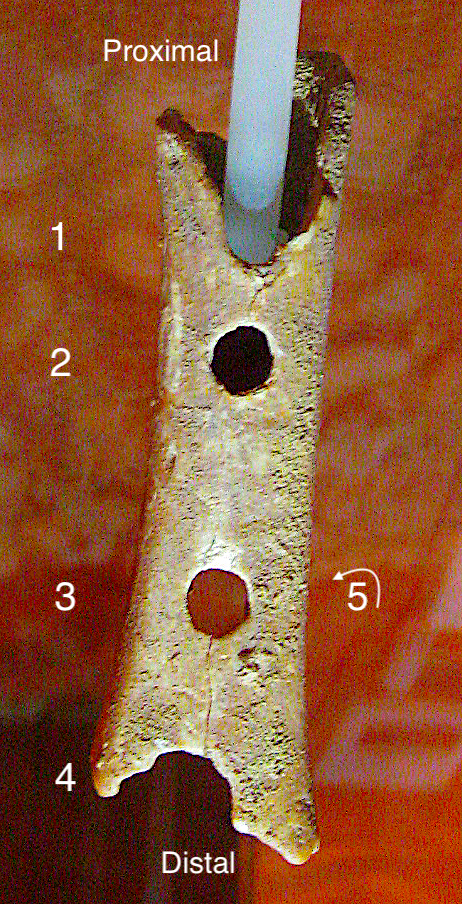
Divje Babe flute - holes

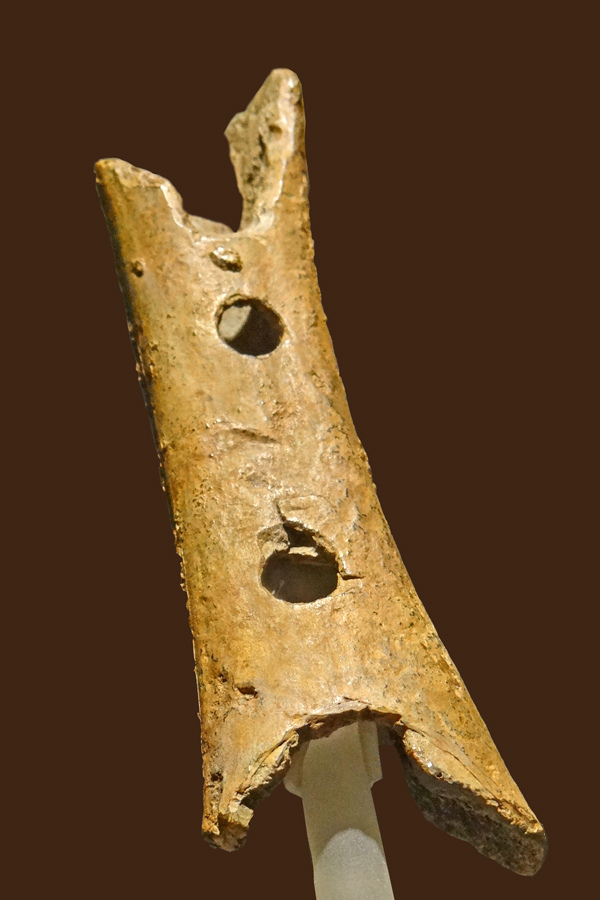
Divje Babe flute

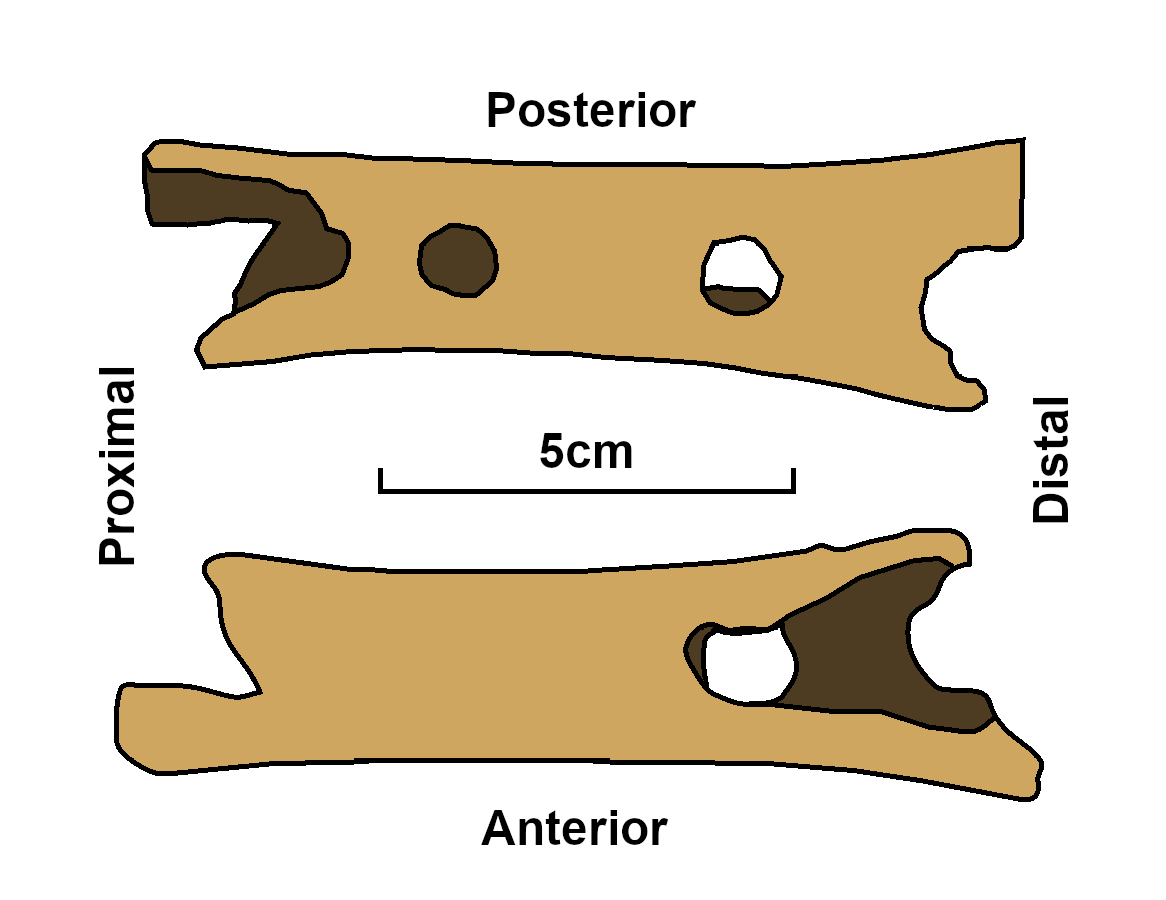
Diagram

The artifact is an 11.4 cm long left diaphysis of femur that belonged to a one to two year old cave bear cub. On the posterior side, there are two complete holes in the central diaphysis (2 and 3). At both ends, the bone is broken, but there are two semicircular notches, one on each side of the two complete holes (1 and 4). On the anterior side, there is a semicircular notch (5) in the broken end.

According to Turk, all the holes and notches are arranged in a line and have a similar morphology, except for the larger notch 4.

Proximally and distally to hole 3, a portion of the cortical bone is abraded. On this spot, a longitudinal fibrous bone structure is exposed. Near the proximal edge of hole 3, there are two parallel micro-scores on the abraded surface of the cortical bone.

Inside the medullary cavity from which the spongy bone was removed, the cortical bone is broken off at the edge of notch/hole 1, 2, 3, and 5. A funnel-shaped fracture of the inner edge of these holes is a typical damage occurring during piercing the cortical bone. Notch 4 does not have a funnel-shaped fracture inside the medullary cavity.

On the posterior side of the bone, a V-shaped fracture is present on the proximal end, reaching the nearest notch 1. On either side of this fracture is a partial straight sharp edge, presumed to be a mouthpiece by Turk.

A similar fracture is present on the anterior side of the distal end, reaching notch 5, which was presumed to be a thumb hole for the flute.

=== Context and dating of the flute ===
The Neanderthal flute was found in the Mousterian level, which contained lithic artefacts and hearths. The flute was cemented into the phosphate breccia in close proximity to the hearth. The Mousterian level containing the flute was below an Aurignacian level containing stone artefacts and osseous points of anatomically modern humans, separated by about 2 m of sediment. Remains of and evidence for many types of large mammals are present at the site as well, including many carnivores which could have interacted with the bone artifact.

Based on the radiocarbon dating of the charcoal found in the hearth, the age of the flute was initially estimated at 43,100 ± 700 years BP. Later dating using electron spin resonance (ESR) has shown that the layer containing the flute was outside the accurate range of the radiocarbon method, and that the original dating of samples from this layer was incorrect. According to ESR dating, the age of the flute is now estimated at 50,000 to 60,000 years BP.

=== Argument for carnivore origin ===
Arguments have been made that the holes were possibly created by the teeth of an animal, chewing or gnawing on the bone, and that the resemblance to a flute is only coincidental.

Other known Upper Palaeolithic flutes made from the limb bones of mammals show clear traces of artificial creation of holes which were carved or drilled with stone tools. In flutes made from thin, delicate bird bones, the holes were made by grinding the bone cortex. The edges of the holes on the Neanderthal flute differs from those on Upper Palaeolithic flutes and shows no conventional signs of human manufacture (i.e., cut marks). In addition, both ends of the Neanderthal flute show damage typical of gnawing by carnivores.

- Francesco D'Errico (1998) made an analysis of the artifact in comparison to cave-bear bone accumulations where no hominid presence was known. After inspecting the artifact firsthand, D'Errico wrote that "the presence of two or possibly three perforations on the suggested flute cannot therefore be considered as evidence of human manufacture, as this is a common feature in the studied sample." Of one sample, D'Errico stated that a "femur of a young cave bear from the same site shows two holes very similar in size and shape to those on the supposed flute, recorded on the same face and in the same anatomical position."
- Nowell and Chase (1998) published an analysis of the flute, stating "the specimen has very clearly been heavily gnawed by a carnivore", compared it to other well known specimens of similar bones, argued that notch 5 was likely created at the same time as hole 3 by the animal's opposing teeth, and that the heavy gnawing at both ends was evidence that the bone had not been cleared of marrow which would have been needed to play it as a flute. "This is a chewed bone, nothing about it is inconsistent with this as an explanation, and nothing about the bone is very surprising given that it was heavily chewed."
- Gerd Albrecht et al. (1998) conducted experiments with bones and stone tools and concluded that "at this time there are no confirmed arguments for flutes made from bear bones, including the find from Divje Babe."
- Ian Morley (2006) wrote, in a review of many prior publications, "it is most likely that the Divje babe I object as we see it today is the product of a number of stages (of) carnivore activity, and there is no need to invoke any hominin agency in the creation of the object."
- Cajus Diedrich (2015) suggested the holes could be explained by scavenging from spotted hyena.

Turk has published many articles rebutting the carnivore origin over the decades since the bone was found. In 2001, Turk's group made metal dental casts of cave bear, wolf and hyena dentition. The casts were used to pierce juvenile and adult fresh brown bear femurs. Several arguments were made:

- Only the canine teeth of a bear were a suitable match, but because of the oval cross-section of a bear's tooth it would be awkward for the bear to have aligned this bone correctly to produce the holes in this orientation.
- Holes pierced with canine teeth have smooth edges, whereas the edges of the holes on the Neanderthal flute are irregular and serrated.
- It would be impossible for a carnivore to make two or more holes on the thickest and the rigid central part of the juvenile femur without breaking it. (Morley disputed this: "Turk et al. ... say that the diaphysis cracked in three out of eight experimental piercings. ... In summary, it would seem that the bone need not have shattered.")

Though he argues for Neanderthal origin of the artifact, Turk presumed that the V-fracture at the proximal end is a typical carnivore damage that occurred after the flute was no longer in use.

=== Argument for Neanderthal origin of the holes ===
Arguments have been made by Turk and colleagues that it is possible for this artifact to be produced with known Neanderthal tools.

Pointed stone tools appropriate for piercing bone were found in several Mousterian levels at Divje babe I. In addition, several ad hoc bone punches were found in Mousterian levels.

- Turk believed that micro-scores near hole 3 suggested the cut marks of stone tools, indicating artificial modification of the cortical bone before hole 3 was made, thinning the cortical bone where it is the thickest to facilitate perforation of the femur.
- Turk found broken tips, fractures and macroscopic damage presented on some pointed stone tools. Turk and colleagues found experimentally that the same type of damage occurs if one hits the stone tool with a wooden hammer when chiselling and piercing bone.
- Using replicas of pointed stone tools, Giuliani Bastiani (1997) pierced bones with a previously undescribed method: he used the pointed stone tool simultaneously as a chisel and a punch, and succeeded in making holes in the fresh femur similar to those on the flute (i.e., holes with irregular, serrated edge). The conclusion from this experiment was that the edge of the holes made in this way did not always show the characteristic cut marks left by a stone tool. However, the holes made by Bastiani did not have such pronounced funnel-shaped fractures around the inner edge, as found on the holes of the flute.
- Following Bastiani's experiment, archaeologist Francois Zoltán Horusitzky (2003) used a pointed stone tool, first making a shallow pit in a fresh bone without piercing it, then inserted a bone punch into the pit and struck it with a wooden hammer to pierce the bone cortex. The holes made with this technique have a pronounced funnel-shaped fracture around the inner edge and showed no conventional tool marks.
- Turk published a 2005 analysis of the specimen based on computed tomography, in which he concluded that "the two partially preserved holes were formerly created before the damage ... or before the indisputable intervention of a carnivore."

Iain Morley (2006) was critical of Kunej and Turk's assessment, noting that despite the large number of bones discovered at the site, "only two [showed] other possible cases of human action ... and the subject femur is the only one of 600 cave bear femurs to carry any such possible traces of human action." He concluded that "the direct evidence for human agency is, at best, highly ambiguous, and there is a lack of evidence of other possible human workmanship on the bone."

=== Argument for a musical instrument ===
An additional argument for Neanderthal construction is that the artifact itself must be a flute, having the correct shape and proportions to be a musical instrument. Much of this argument hinges on whether the notches at the ends are evidence of 4 or 5 holes in the prior intact flute.

- Turk (1997) wrote in his book that the holes have similar diameters which would accommodate fingertips, and all are circular instead of oval. All are in the proper ratio of bore size to hole size found in most flutes, and the bone is the kind (femur) usually used for bone flutes.
- Turk believed that there was evidence that marrow had been cleared from the bone at time of use, which would have been necessary to use it as a flute, though Nowell disputed this:
  - Turk et al. (1997) wrote that "the marrow cavity is basically cleaned of spongiose. The colour of the marrow cavity does not differ from the colour of the external surface of the bone. So we may conclude that the marrow cavity was already open at the time ... Otherwise, it would be a darker colour than the surface of the bone, as we know from coloured marrow cavities of whole limb bones."
  - April Nowell (1998) stated in an interview that "at Turk's invitation, [Nowell] and Chase went to Slovenia last year ... They came away even more skeptical that the bear bone had ever emitted music. For one thing, both ends had clearly been gnawed away by something, perhaps a wolf, seeking greasy marrow. The holes could have simply been perforated in the process by pointed canine or carnassial teeth, and their roundness could be due to natural damage after the bone was abandoned. The presence of marrow suggests that no one had bothered to hollow out the bone as if to create an end-blown flute. Says Nowell, '[Turk's] willing to give it the benefit of the doubt, whereas we're not.'"
- Bob Fink (1997) claimed that the spacing of the holes were consistent with four notes of the diatonic scale, however the required length he proposed for the intact bone caused it to be rejected by other researchers (see diatonic scale below).
- Marcel Otte (2000) wrote that "the instrument consists of not two perforations (as Chase and Nowell indicate) but five (like five fingers of a hand): four on one side, one on the opposite side. ... The fifth hole appears at the base of the opposite side, at the natural location of the thumb."
- Ljuben Dimkaroski (2011) created an experimental version of the flute with demonstrated musical capability, requiring only very conservative reconstruction of the existing artifact's shape (see reconstruction below).

==== Diatonic scale ====
Bob Fink (1997) claimed that the bone's holes were "consistent with four notes of the diatonic scale" (do, re, mi, fa) based on the spacing of those four holes. He argued that this spacing of the holes on a modern diatonic flute are unique, and not arbitrarily spaced, and that with the correct total length of bone it would perfectly match this scale. After Kunej and Turk (2000) argued that due to the age of the bear cub, it could not be as long as proposed, Fink updated the argument on his personal website with a proposition that the bone may have been extended with another section of bone.

Nowell and Chase had been first to raise the counter-argument that the juvenile bear bone was too short to play those four holes in tune to any diatonic series of tones and half-tones, as proposed by Fink. Blake Edgar (1998) wrote in California Wild:

[Nowell] along with archeologist Philip Chase, had serious doubts as soon as they saw photos of the bone on the Internet. ... The Divje Babe bone bears some resemblance to the dozens of younger, uncontested bone flutes from European Upper Paleolithic sites. But, says Nowell, these obvious flutes are longer, have more holes, and exhibit telltale tool marks left from their manufacture. No such marks occur on the bear bone. Fink proposed that the spacing of the flute's holes matches music's standard diatonic scale. ... Nowell and Chase teamed with a more musically inclined colleague to show that the bear bone would need to be twice its natural total length to conform to a diatonic scale.

Ljuben Dimkaroski (2011) created a reconstruction of the instrument based on his own research, which was able to play a diatonic scale, but in a very different way than proposed by Fink. See reconstruction below.

==== Reconstruction ====
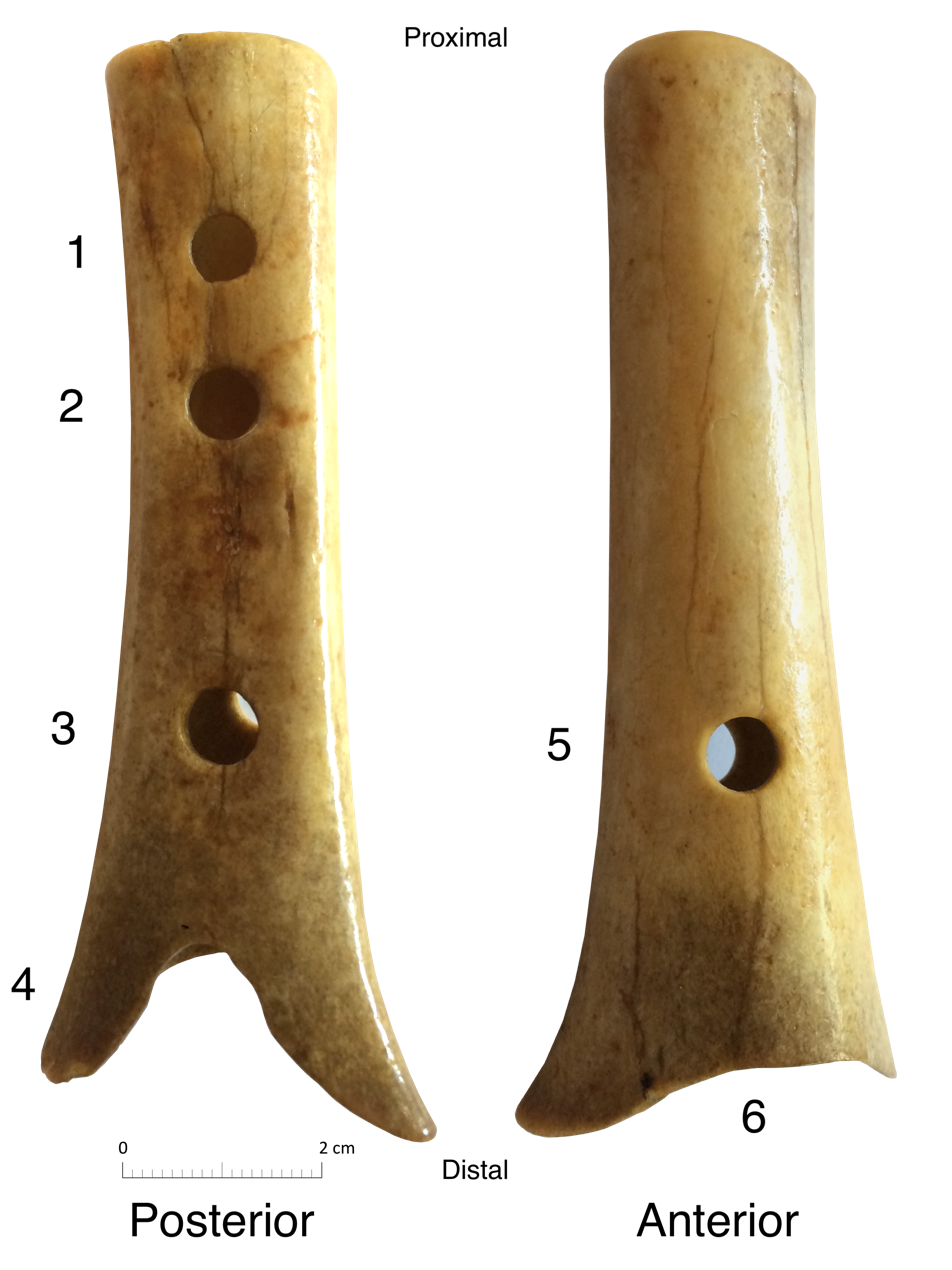
Tidldibab, replica of the flute

Ljuben Dimkaroski playing scales on Tidldibab, replica of the Divje Babe flute

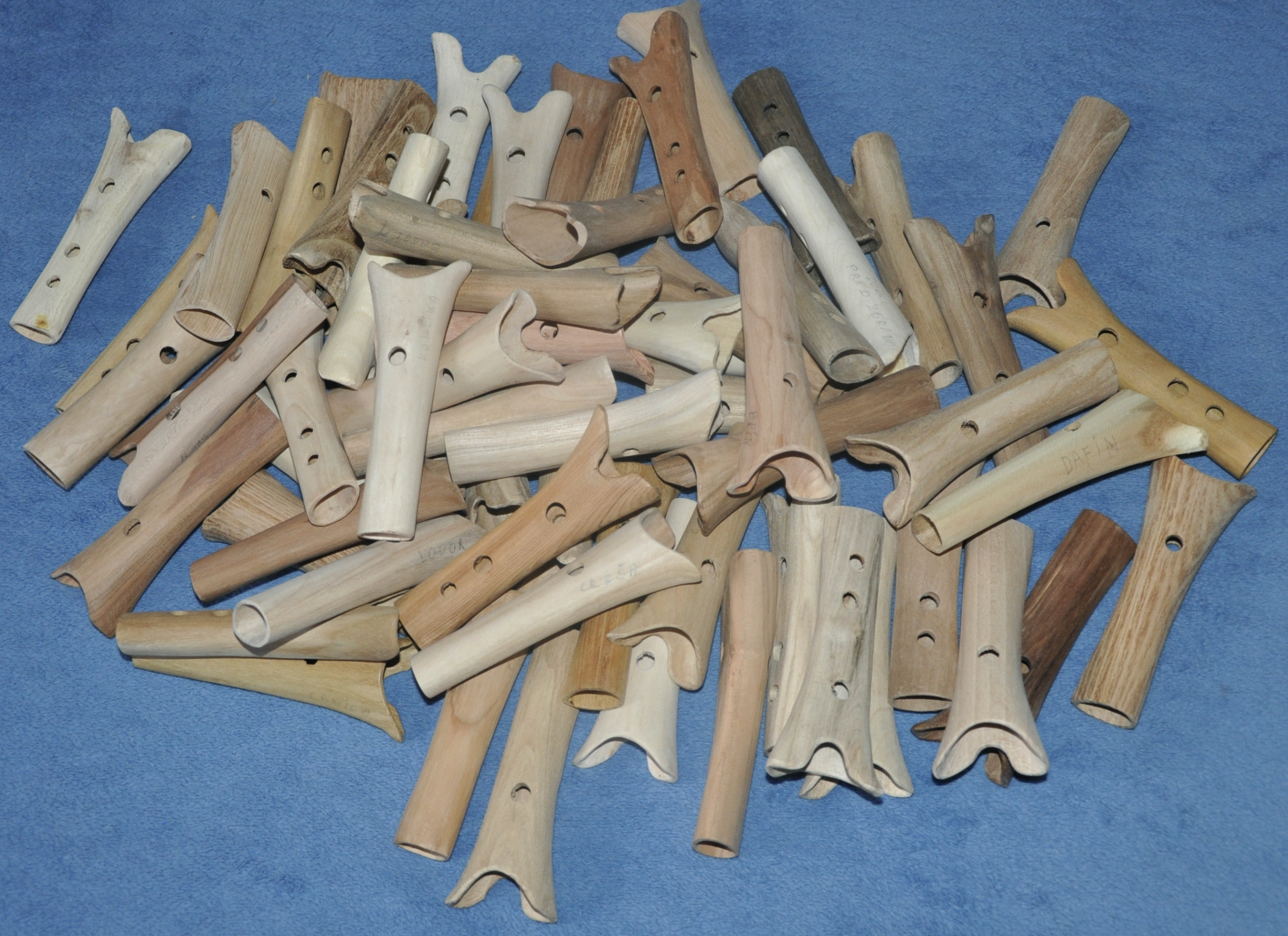
Collection of Tidldibab instruments, wooden replicas of the Divje Babe flute, made by Ljuben Dimkaroski

Ljuben Dimkaroski created a replica instrument based on the proposed intact form of the flute. This replica has demonstrated that it could indeed be used as a flute, and produce well known musical scales. Though this artifact had been previously studied by several musical researchers, Ljuben Dimkaroski, a professional musician, undertook his own independent study in 2011. In collaboration with Matija Turk, Dimkaroski created over 100 experimental wooden and bone replicas of the flute.

Dimkaroski's replica oriented the instrument using the proximal end of the femur as a mouthpiece. On the anterior proximal part a straight sharpened edge is preserved, which Dimkaroski considered to be a remnant of the blowing edge of its mouthpiece. With this orientation of the instrument, the role of hole 5 on the anterior side, becomes a palm hole rather than a thumb hole as previously thought. In the reverse orientation, Dimkaroski found the location of this hole was too close to the mouthpiece and thus dysfunctional.

The reconstructed instrument has three finger holes (holes 1–3) on the posterior side and a palm hole (hole 5) on the anterior side of the femur. Notch 4 is left as a notch, rather than reconstructing it as a hole. This forms an opening on the distal part with the function of a bell or closure. With a finger of the right hand, the notch on the posterior distal side may be formed into an additional hole. The opening provides the possibility of playing on an open or closed bell, which additionally enriches the tonal range.

The reconstructed flute has a capability of 3½ octaves. Practiced performers have demonstrated its utility as a musical instrument.

According to Dimkaroski, the name "flute" is not appropriate for such an instrument, which could be considered a precursor of modern wind instruments. Since the instrument and the way it is played are not comparable to modern wind instruments, he named it TIDLDIBAB. The name is a composite word made up of the initials of the archaeologist who is credited with the discovery of the instrument (Turk Ivan), the musician and maker of its replicas (Dimkaroski Ljuben) and the name of its archaeological find spot (Divje Babe).

== See also ==
- Potočka zijalka - Another cave excavation in Slovenia, containing the remains of a human residence dated to the later Aurignacian (40,000 to 30,000 BP).
- List of Neanderthal sites
- Neanderthal
- Musilanguage
- Prehistoric music
- Musical scale
- Diatonic
- Hohle Fels
- Gudi – 6000 BC Chinese bone flute
