= Municipality of Solčava =

Municipality of Slovenia

Municipality of Solčava Občina Solčava
- Municipality
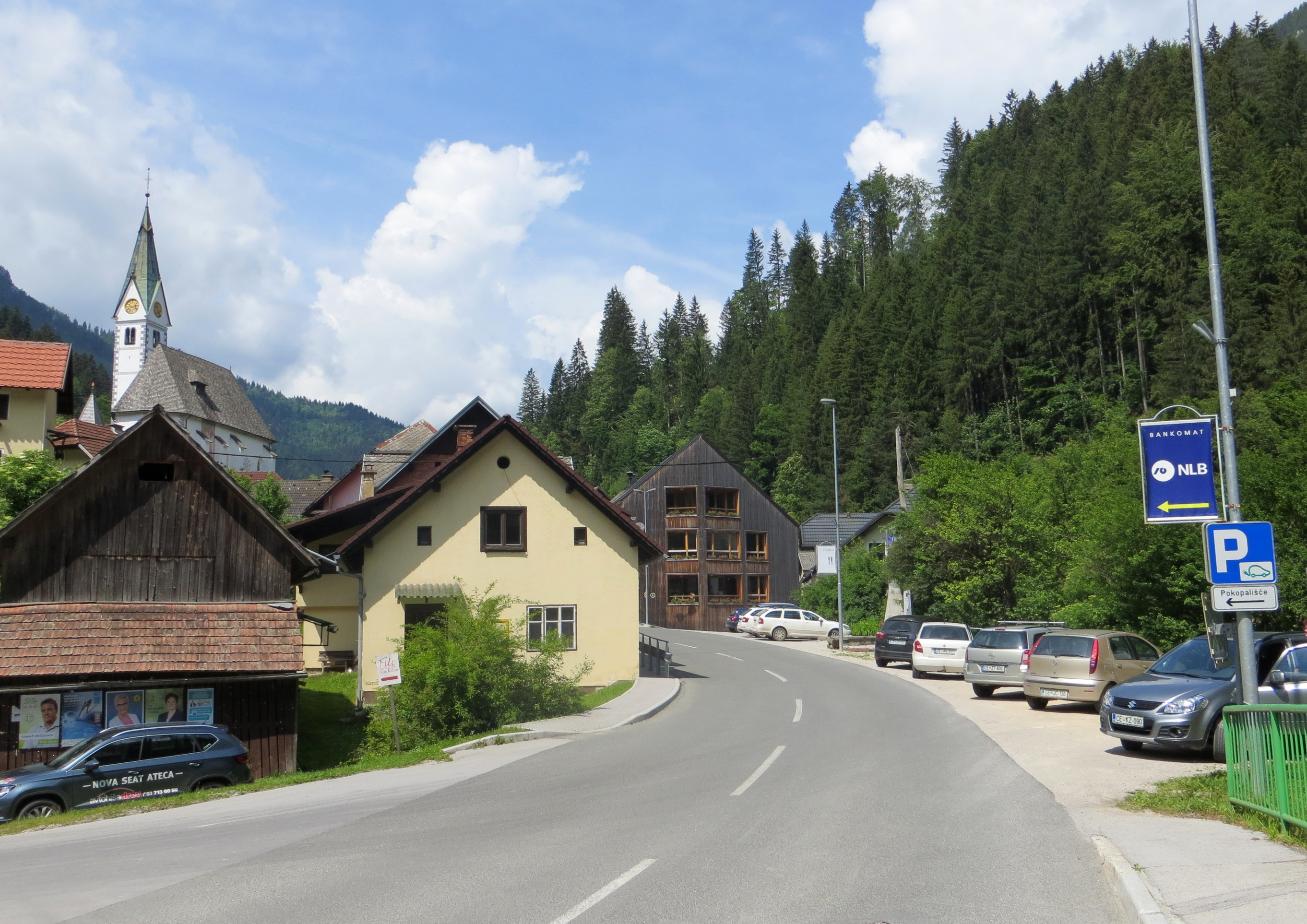

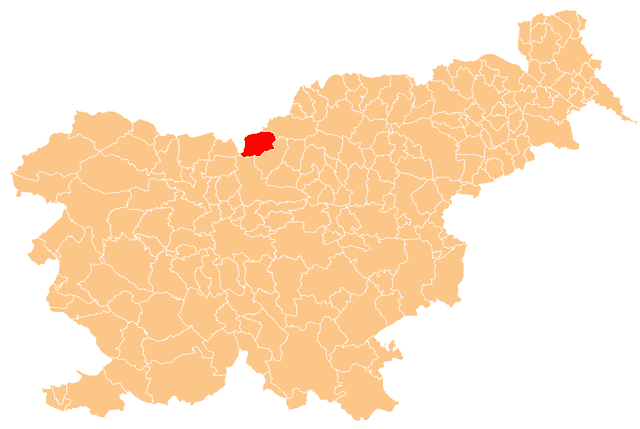
- Location of the Municipality of Solčava in Slovenia
- Coordinates: 46°24′N 14°40′E
- Country: Slovenia

Government
  - Mayor: Katarina Prelesnik

Area
  - Total: 102.8 km^{2} (39.7 sq mi)

Population (2016)
  - Total: 521
  - Density: 5.07/km^{2} (13.1/sq mi)
- Time zone: UTC+01 (CET)
  - Summer (DST): UTC+02 (CEST)
- Website: www.solcava.si

The Municipality of Solčava (pronounced [sɔlˈtʃaːʋa]; Slovene: Občina Solčava) is a municipality in the traditional region of Upper Carniola in northern Slovenia. The seat of the municipality is the town of Solčava. Solčava became a municipality in 1998. It borders Austria.

== Settlements ==
In addition to the municipal seat of Solčava, the municipality also includes the settlements of Logarska Dolina, Podolševa, and Robanov Kot.
