= Robanov Kot =

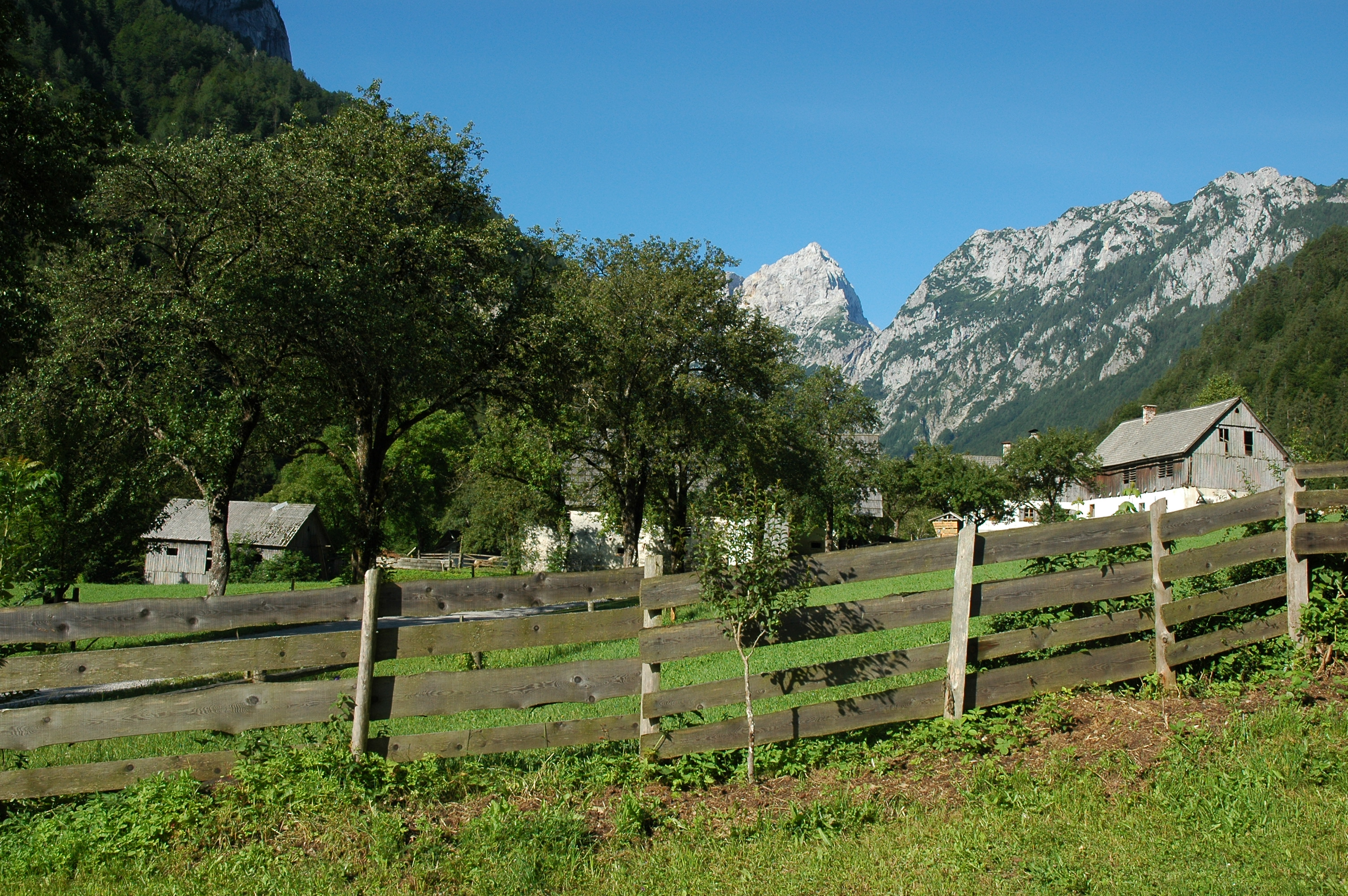

- Location in Slovenia
- Coordinates: 46°23′50.68″N 14°42′36.52″E
- Country: Slovenia
- Traditional region: Styria
- Statistical region: Savinja
- Municipality: Solčava

Area
  - Total: 27.3 km^{2} (10.5 sq mi)
- Elevation: 591.3 m (1,940 ft)

Population (2002)
  - Total: 141

Robanov Kot (pronounced [ɾɔˈbaːnɔu̯ ˈkoːt]) is a dispersed settlement in the Municipality of Solčava in northern Slovenia. The area belongs to the traditional region of Styria and is now included in the Savinja Statistical Region.

== Geography ==
Robanov Kot lies along the main road from Luče to Solčava, which follows the Savinja River. Hamlets and farmsteads in the settlement include Gašpirc, Haudej, Opresnik, Račnik, Roban, Rogovilc, Suhadolnik, and Tolstovršnik. The territory of the settlement extends southwest along the Roban Cirque (Slovene: Robanov kot), reaching its highest elevation at Mount Ojstrica (2,350 meters or 7,710 feet), and northeast along the slope of Big Mount Raduha (Slovene: Velika Raduha; 2,062 meters or 6,765 feet).
