= Divje Babe =

Cave and archaeological site in Slovenia

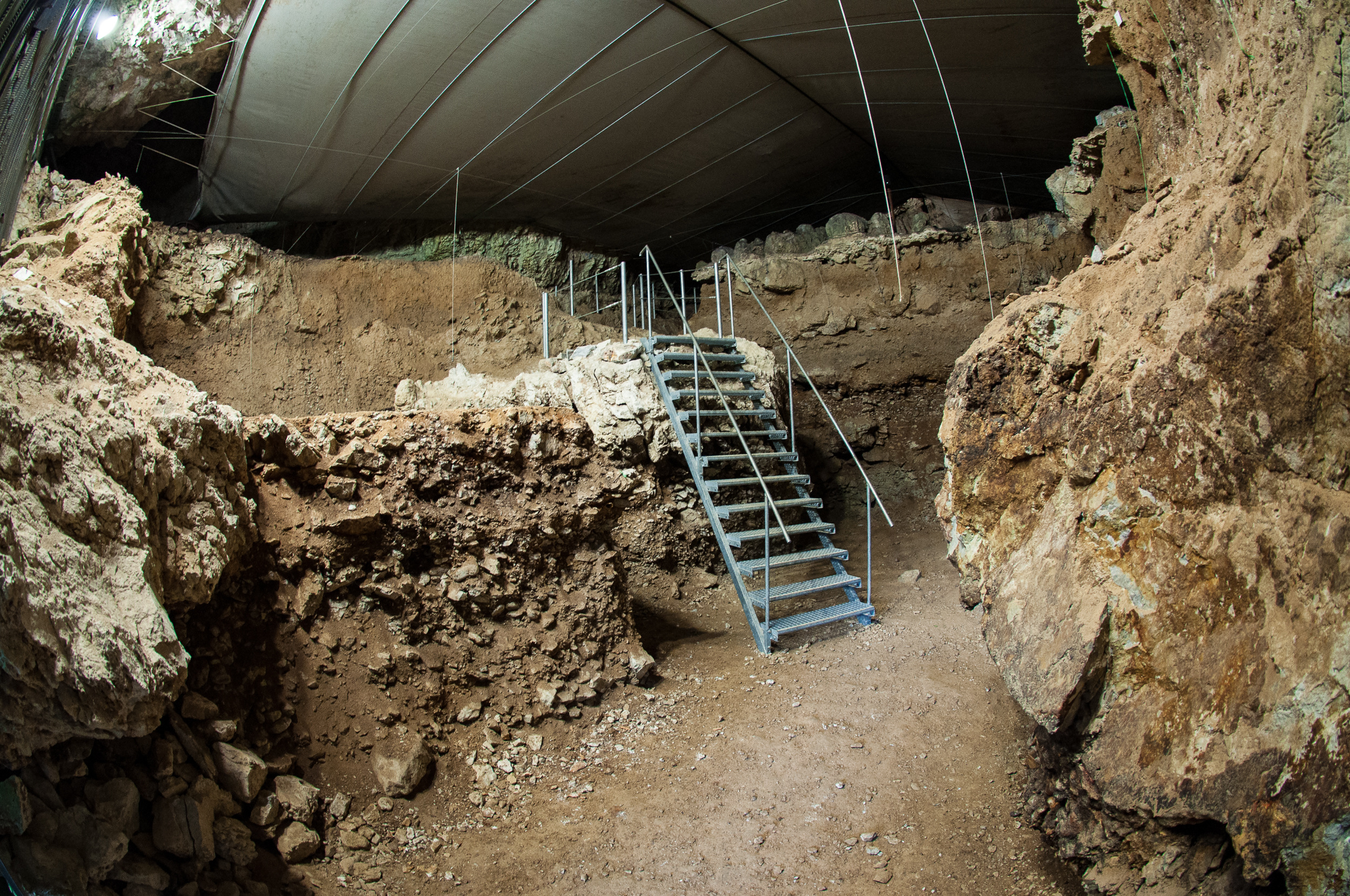
- Inside Divje Babe I

- Location within Slovenia Location within Europe
- Location: Municipality of Cerkno, Slovenia
- Coordinates: 46°06′46″N 13°54′56″E
- Length: 45 m (148 ft)
- Geology: Karst
- Cave survey: 15 m (49 ft)

Divje Babe (pronounced [ˈdiːwjɛ ˈbaːbɛ]) is a karst cave and archaeological park overlooking the Idrijca River in northwestern Slovenia. It is noted for its Paleolithic remains, including the worked bone of cave bear known as the Divje Babe Flute, which has controversially been interpreted as a Neanderthal musical instrument.

== Name ==
The name Divje Babe (literally, 'wild women') refers to witches, which were often believed to live in caves. The name therefore means 'Witch Cave'.

== Location ==
Divje Babe is located at 230 m (750 ft) above the valley of the Idrijca River. The Idrijca cuts through the Idrija Hills and Cerkno Hills, and opens to the Soča River.

== Paleontology ==
The cave site (Divje Babe I) was excavated from 1978 to 1986 by Mitja Brodar, and again from 1989 to 1995 by Ivan Turk and Janez Dirjec. The excavations dug through 12 m (39 ft) of infilling consisting of 26 main sediment layers. Among the artifacts uncovered were Aurignacian finds, including a bone point (in layer 2 or 3) dated to around 35,000 years ago. Around eight layers from the Mesolithic have been excavated containing around 20 hearths, 600 stone tools, and several bone artifacts. Numerous skeletal remains of the cave bear have also been found.

The Divje Babe Flute was found in layer 8, dated to the Middle Paleolithic of 50,000 to 35,000 years ago. It was in close vicinity to a hearth, indicating the presence of prehistoric people, probably Neanderthals. The flute is a fragment of a thigh bone from a young cave bear with four recessed holes. The interpretation of the artifact as a flute is controversial and has been subject of fierce debate; some research instead suggests that the holes are of animal origin, hyena teeth marks.
