= Lože, Vipava =

Lože
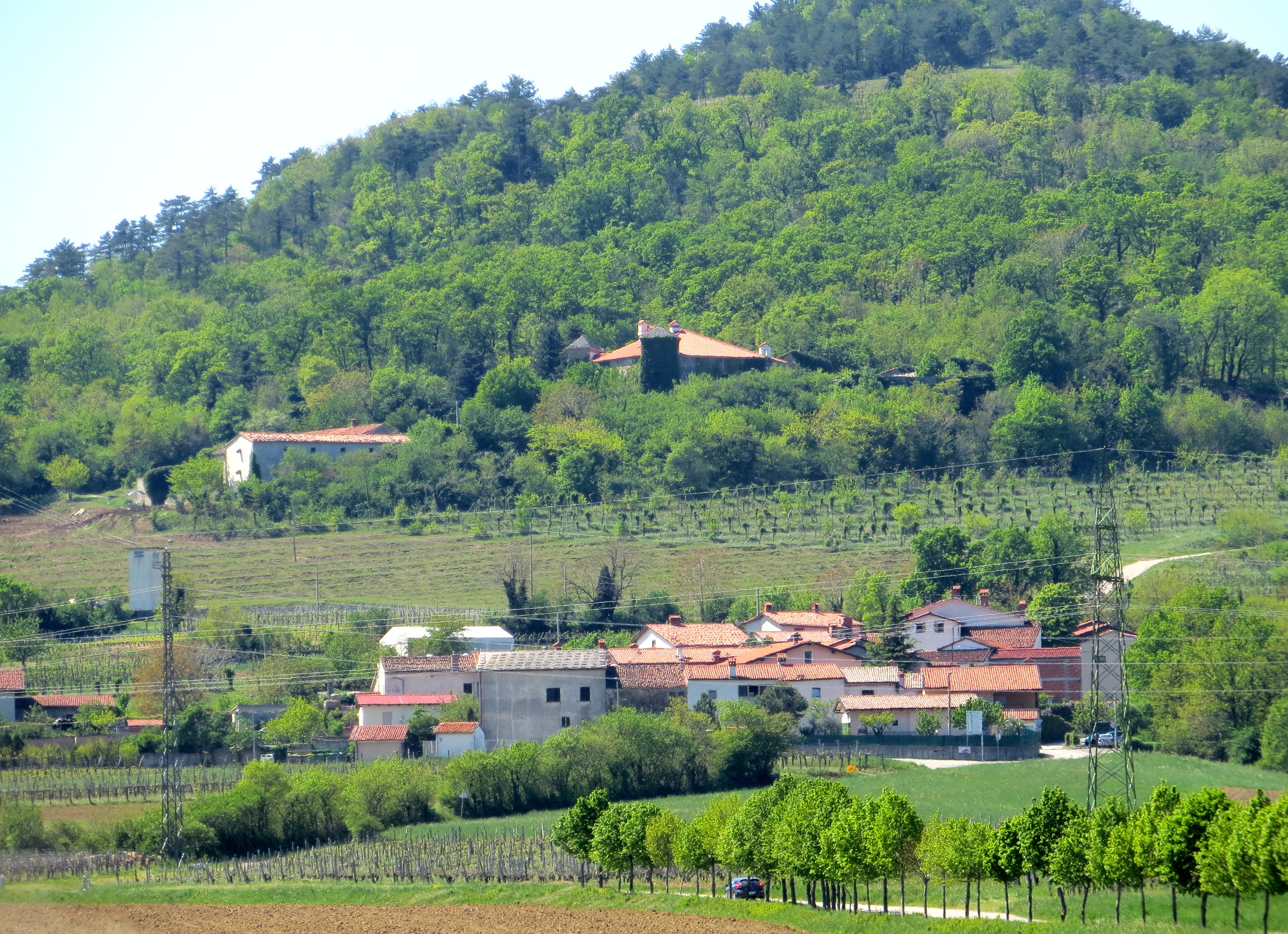

- Location in Slovenia
- Coordinates: 45°49′39.76″N 13°56′14.52″E
- Country: Slovenia
- Traditional region: Inner Carniola
- Statistical region: Gorizia
- Municipality: Vipava

Area
  - Total: 1.64 km^{2} (0.63 sq mi)
- Elevation: 139.4 m (457 ft)

Population (2002)
  - Total: 215

Lože (pronounced [ˈloːʒɛ], German: Losche) is a village in the Vipava Valley in the Municipality of Vipava in the traditional Inner Carniola region of Slovenia. It is now generally regarded as part of the Slovenian Littoral.

== Castle ==
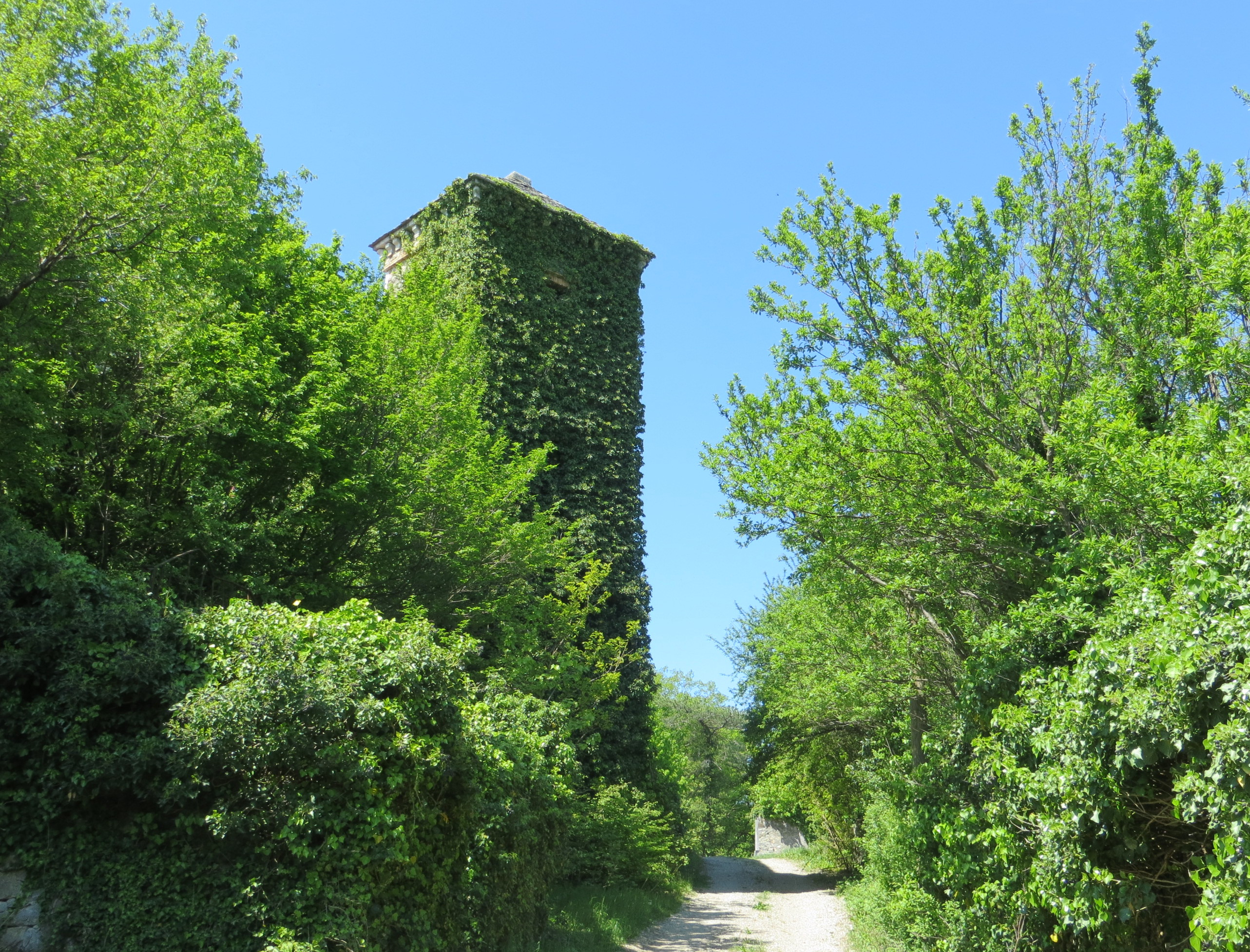
East tower of Leitenburg Castle

Seventeenth-century Leitenburg Castle (a.k.a. Lože Castle) is located just outside the village.

== Notable people ==
Notable people that were born or lived in Lože include the following:

- Ana Mayer Kansky (1895–1962), chemist and chemical engineer
