= Leitenburg Castle =

Castle in Lože, Vipava, Slovenia

Coordinates: 45°49′45.95″N 13°56′4.68″E

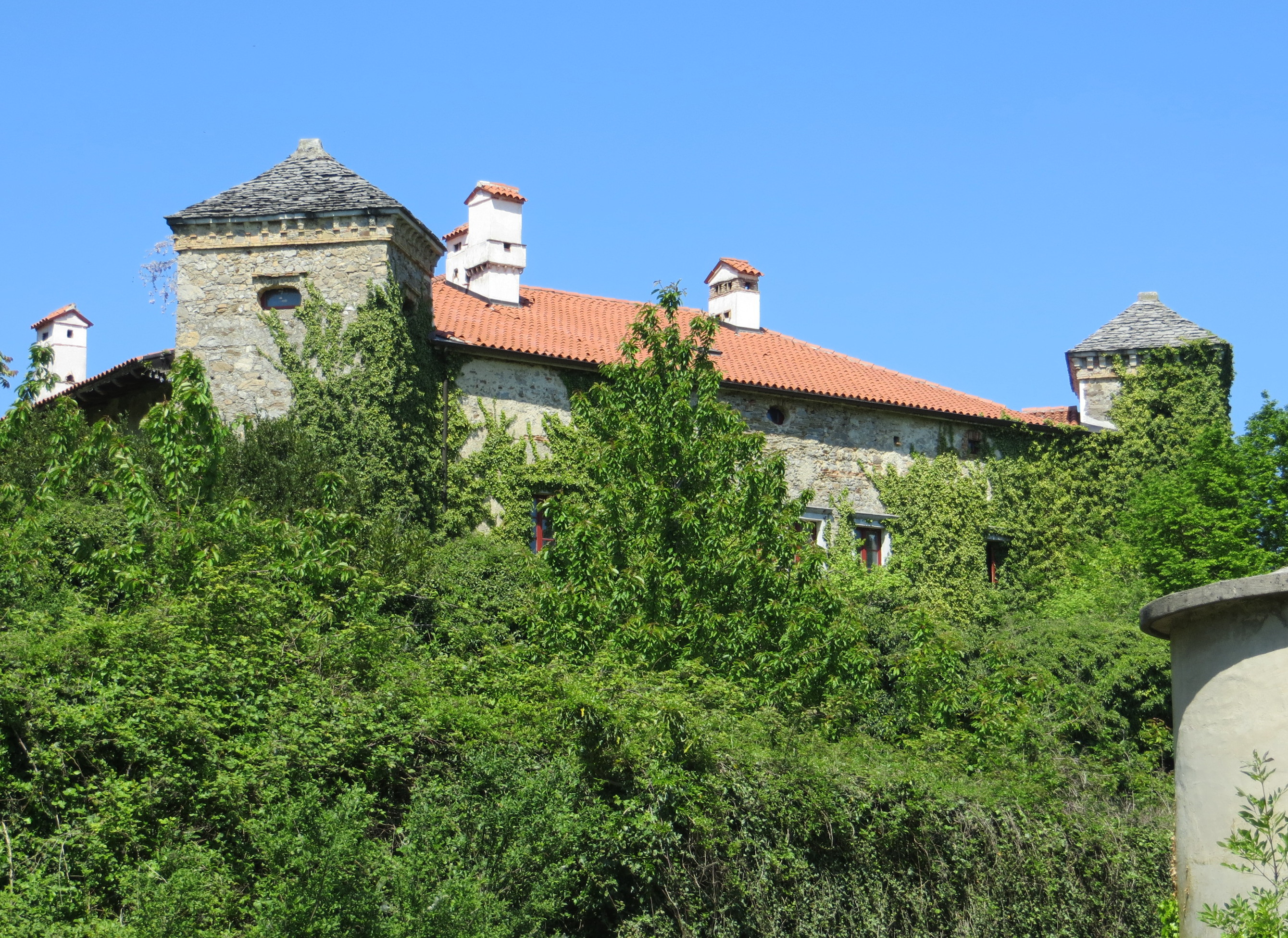
Leitenburg Castle

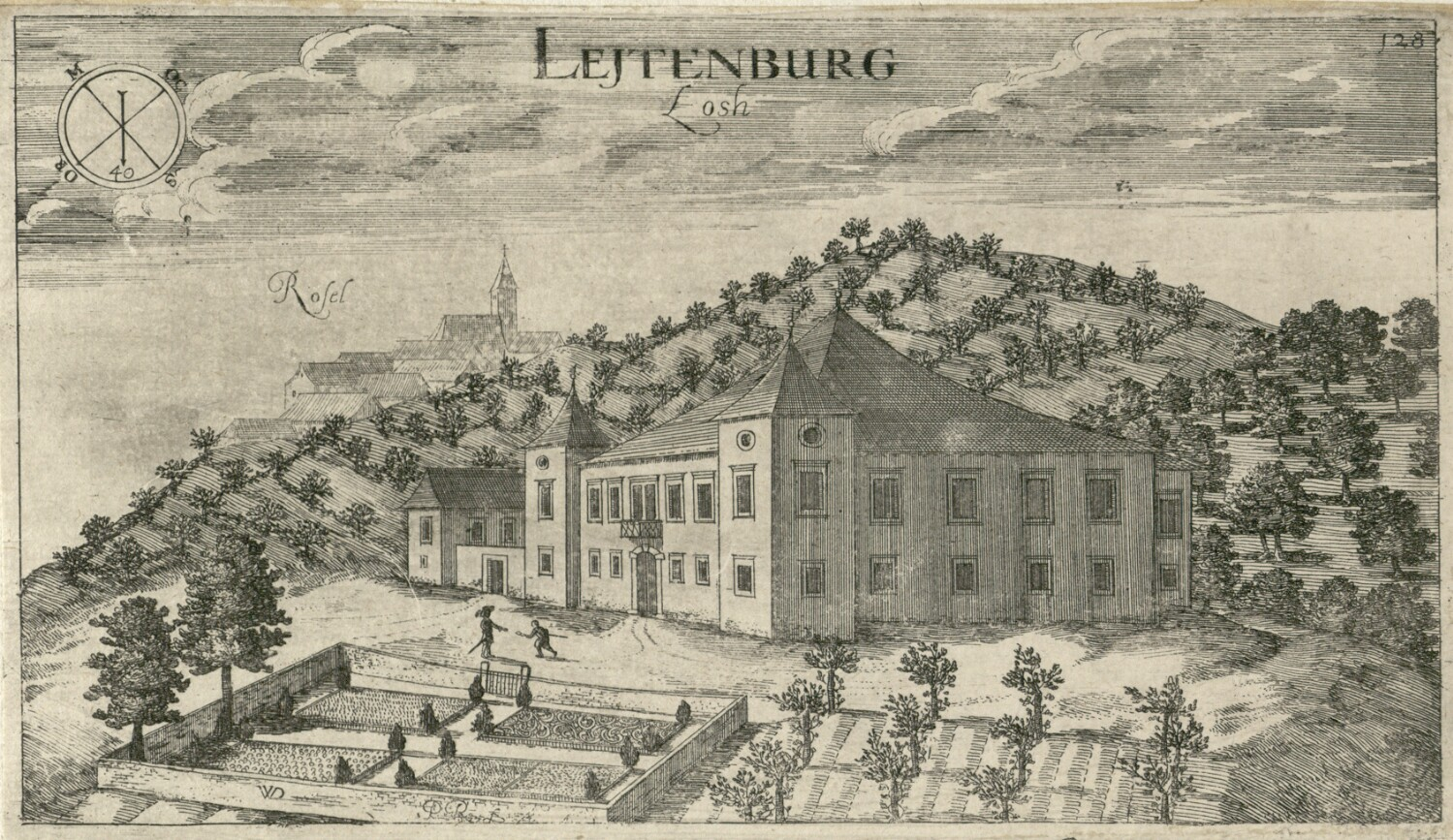
Leitenburg Castle by Valvasor

Leitenburg Castle (a.k.a. Leutenberg, Leutenburg, sometimes Leutemberg, Lože Castle) is a castle in Lože, a village in the Municipality of Vipava in southwestern Slovenia. It was originally built in the 12th century but it was later reconstructed and rebuilt.
