= Postojna =

- Town
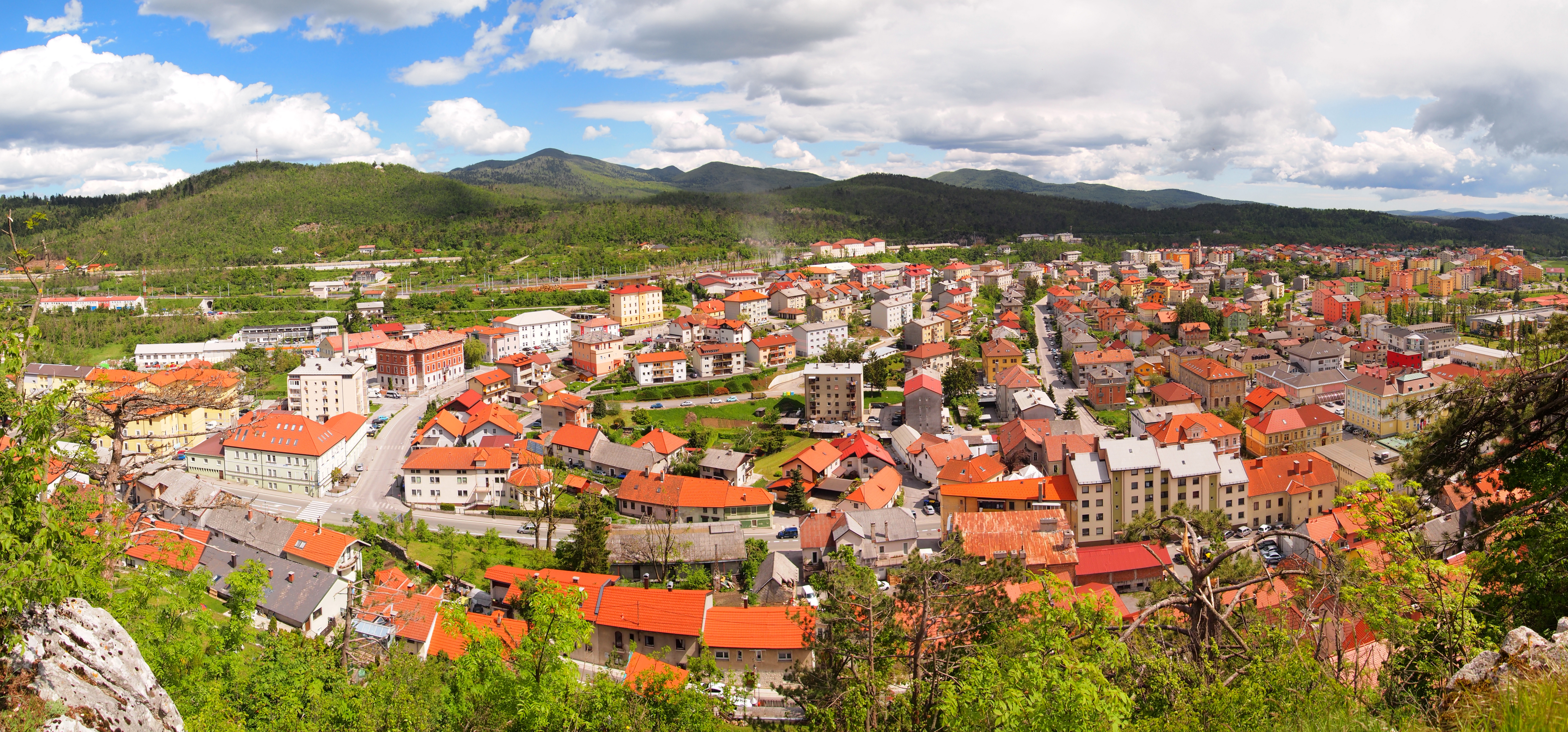
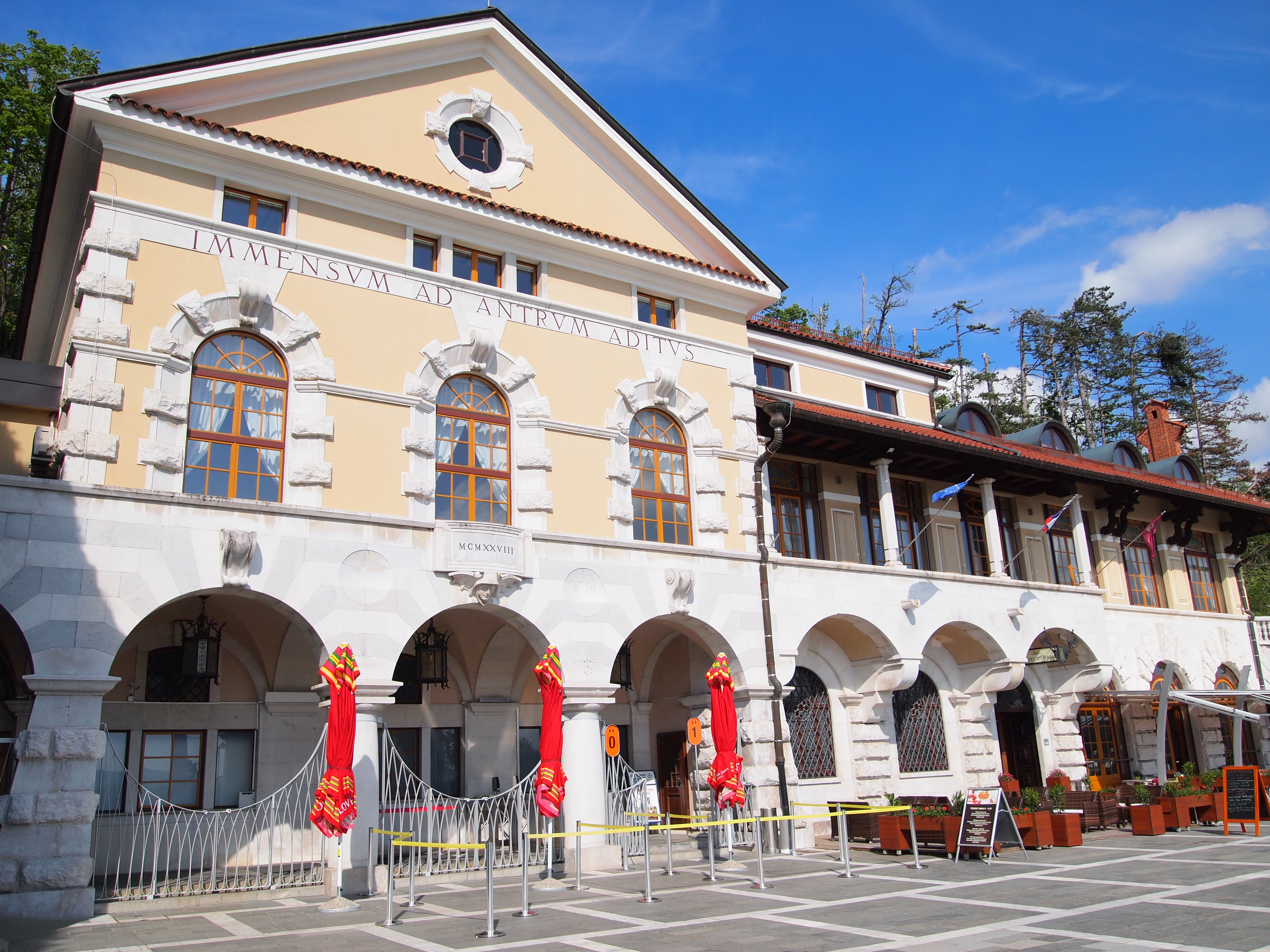
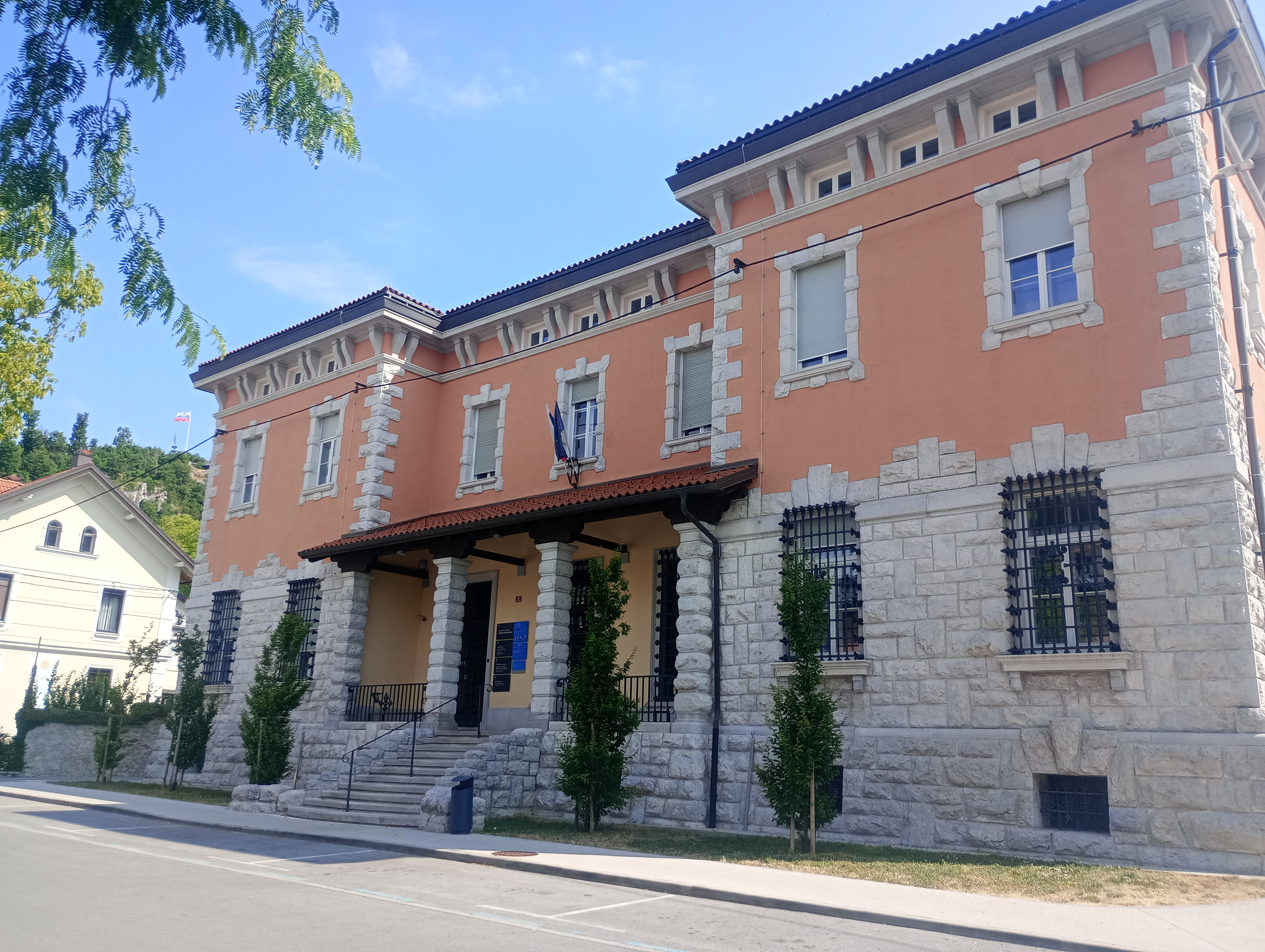
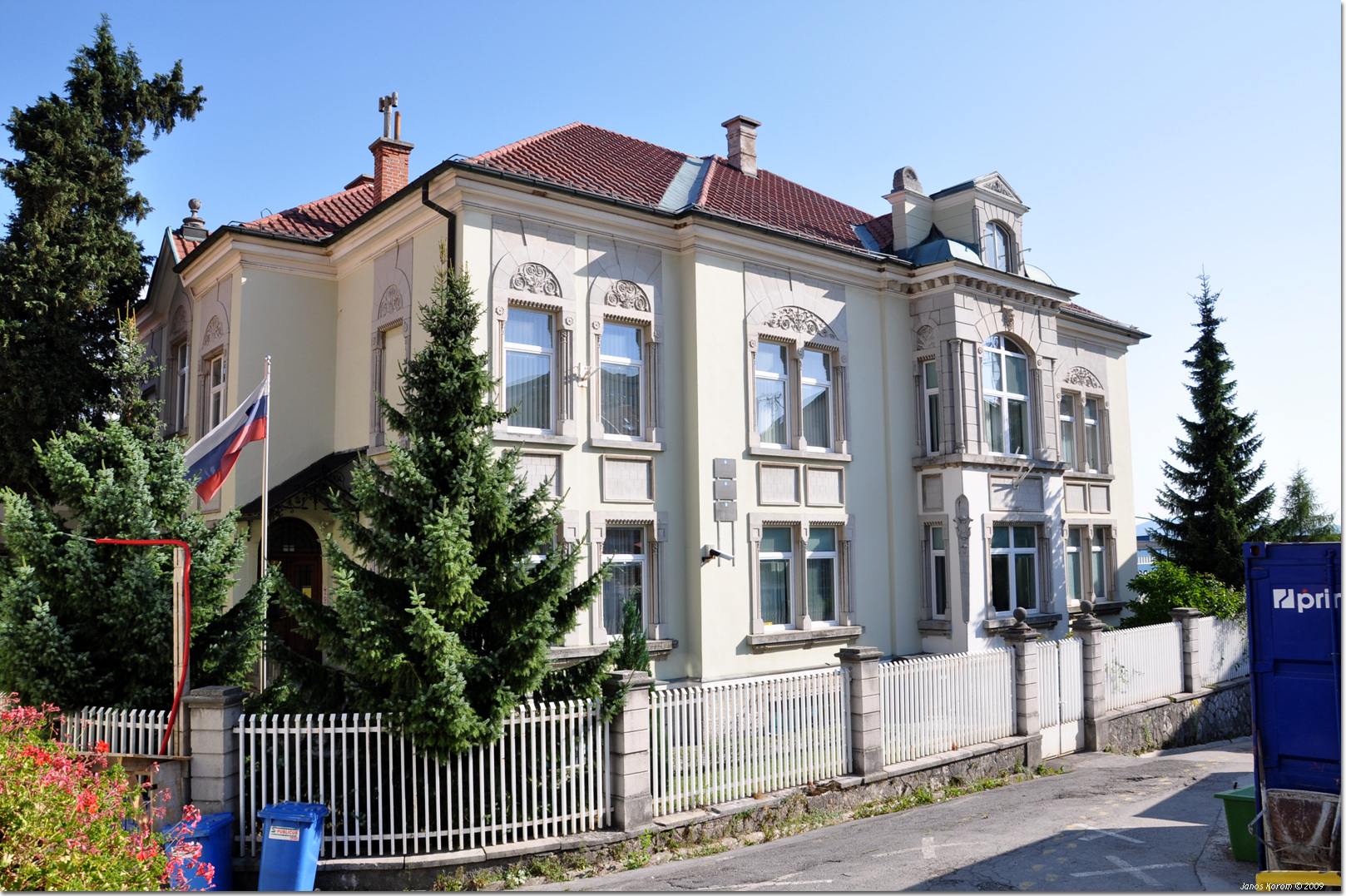
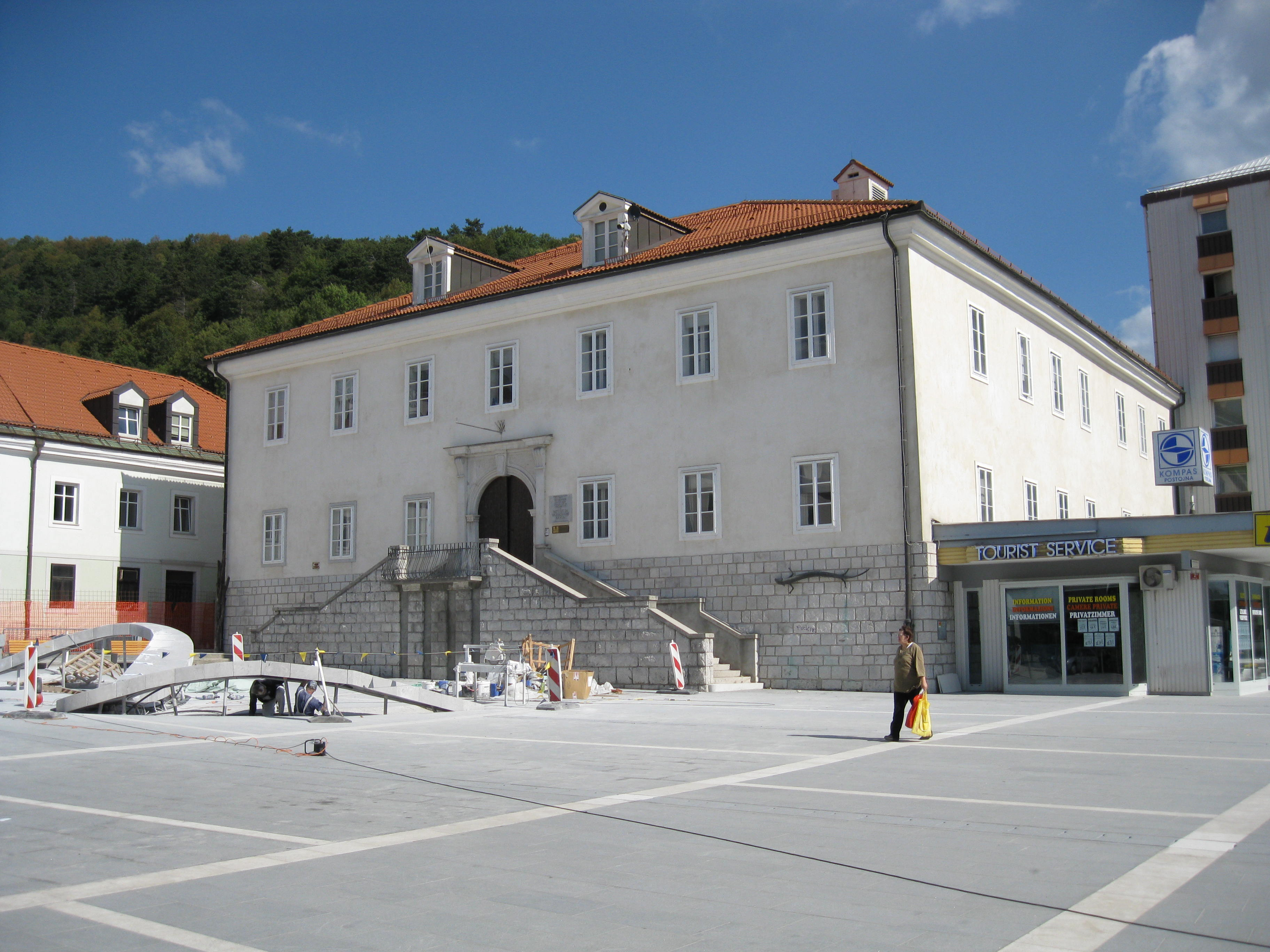
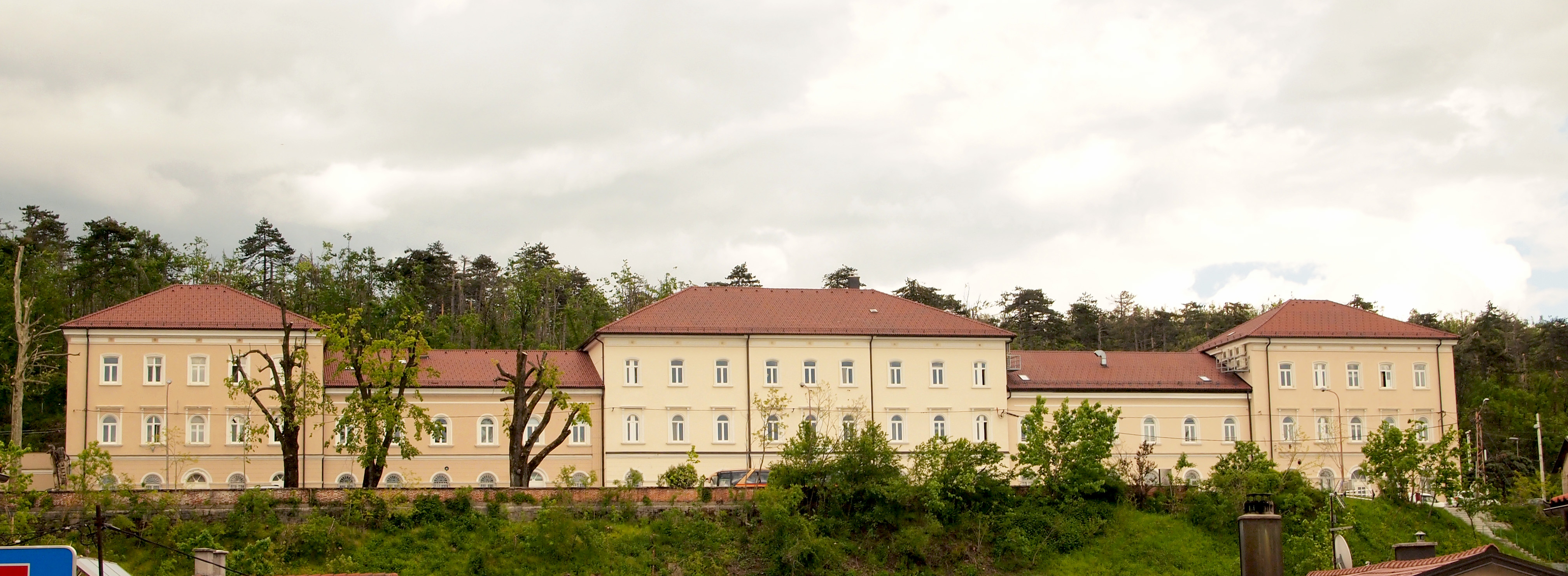
- From top, left to right: Postojna from a nearby hill, Postojna Cave entrance manor, Admimistrative Unit, Villa Jurca, Karst Research Institute, Railway station

- Flag Coat of arms

- Location in Slovenia
- Coordinates: 45°46′33.11″N 14°12′49.18″E
- Country: Slovenia
- Traditional region: Inner Carniola
- Statistical region: Littoral–Inner Carniola
- Municipality: Postojna

Government
  - Mayor: Igor Marentič (Independent)

Area
  - Total: 33.3 km^{2} (12.9 sq mi)
- Elevation: 556.4 m (1,825 ft)

Population (2020)
  - Total: 9,605
  - Density: 288/km^{2} (747/sq mi)
- Time zone: UTC+1 (CET)
  - Summer (DST): UTC+2 (CEST)
- Postal code: 6230
- Area code: 05
- Vehicle registration: PO
- Climate: Cfb
- Website: www.postojna.si

Postojna (pronounced [pɔˈstóːjna]; German: Adelsberg, Italian: Postumia) is a town in the traditional region of Inner Carniola, 35 kilometers (22 mi) from Trieste, in southwestern Slovenia. It is the seat of the Municipality of Postojna. It includes the hamlet of Ravbarkomanda (sometimes also spelled Ravberkomanda, German: Räubercommando) to the northeast.

== History ==
The area is known to have been populated since the Paleolithic era due to the discovery of a cave settlement near the town of Postojna called Betal Rock Shelter (Betalov spodmol). The town lies on the Pivka River. Written sources first mention the settlement in the 13th century and in 1432 it became a borough. It was proclaimed a town in 1909.

From the late Middle Ages, it was part of the Duchy of Carniola and hence of the Habsburg monarchy. In the 19th century, it was part of the Inner Carniola Kreis. It was part of the Italy under the Treaty of Rapallo between 1918 and 1943 (nominally to 1947) and was part of the province of Trieste as Postumia.

=== Mass grave ===
At Postojna there is a mass grave associated with the Second World War. The Pine Shaft Mass Grave (Slovene: Grobišče Brezno v borovcih) is southeast of Postojna, between Little Trebevnik Hill (Mali Trebevnik) and Big Trebevnik Hill (Veliki Trebevnik). It is a steep sinkhole that contains the remains of unidentified victims.

== Climate ==
Climate data for Postojna, 1991–2020 normals, extremes 1951–2020
Month	Jan	Feb	Mar	Apr	May	Jun	Jul	Aug	Sep	Oct	Nov	Dec	Year
Record high °C (°F)	17.2 (63.0)	20 (68)	22.9 (73.2)	27.6 (81.7)	31 (88)	34 (93)	36.2 (97.2)	36.3 (97.3)	31.5 (88.7)	25.7 (78.3)	23.6 (74.5)	16.9 (62.4)	36.3 (97.3)
Mean daily maximum °C (°F)	4.2 (39.6)	6.0 (42.8)	10.2 (50.4)	14.7 (58.5)	19.4 (66.9)	23.6 (74.5)	25.9 (78.6)	26.0 (78.8)	20.3 (68.5)	15.0 (59.0)	9.5 (49.1)	5.1 (41.2)	15.0 (59.0)
Daily mean °C (°F)	0.5 (32.9)	1.3 (34.3)	4.9 (40.8)	8.9 (48.0)	13.4 (56.1)	17.4 (63.3)	19.3 (66.7)	18.9 (66.0)	14.2 (57.6)	10.1 (50.2)	5.6 (42.1)	1.3 (34.3)	9.6 (49.4)
Mean daily minimum °C (°F)	−2.9 (26.8)	−2.8 (27.0)	0.3 (32.5)	3.6 (38.5)	7.6 (45.7)	11.3 (52.3)	12.9 (55.2)	13.1 (55.6)	9.7 (49.5)	6.5 (43.7)	2.6 (36.7)	−2.1 (28.2)	5.0 (41.0)
Record low °C (°F)	−26.8 (−16.2)	−30.4 (−22.7)	−24.2 (−11.6)	−11.7 (10.9)	−5.4 (22.3)	0.2 (32.4)	2.5 (36.5)	1.8 (35.2)	−3 (27)	−9.2 (15.4)	−17.5 (0.5)	−20.9 (−5.6)	−30.4 (−22.7)
Average precipitation mm (inches)	89 (3.5)	104 (4.1)	96 (3.8)	107 (4.2)	124 (4.9)	119 (4.7)	95 (3.7)	100 (3.9)	161 (6.3)	160 (6.3)	172 (6.8)	141 (5.6)	1,468 (57.8)
Average snowfall cm (inches)	15 (5.9)	23 (9.1)	11 (4.3)	3 (1.2)	0 (0)	0 (0)	0 (0)	0 (0)	0 (0)	0.5 (0.2)	9 (3.5)	19 (7.5)	80.5 (31.7)
Average extreme snow depth cm (inches)	4 (1.6)	5 (2.0)	2 (0.8)	0.2 (0.1)	0 (0)	0 (0)	0 (0)	0 (0)	0 (0)	0 (0)	1 (0.4)	3 (1.2)	5 (2.0)
Average precipitation days (≥ 0.1 mm)	11	10	11	13	14	13	12	11	12	13	14	12	146
Average snowy days (≥ 1 cm)	3	3	2	0.4	0	0	0	0	0	0.1	1	3	12.5
Mean monthly sunshine hours	97	115	152	168	214	241	293	285	186	130	75	83	2,039
Source: Slovenian Environment Agency (ARSO)

Historical population
Year	Pop.	±%
1948	3,391	—
1953	4,081	+20.3%
1961	4,857	+19.0%
1971	6,271	+29.1%
1981	8,181	+30.5%
1991	8,621	+5.4%
2002	8,548	−0.8%
2011	9,183	+7.4%
2021	9,750	+6.2%
Population size may be affected by changes in administrative divisions.

== Attractions ==
One of Slovenia's major tourist attractions, Postojna Cave, is located near the town.

== Church ==
The parish church in the town is dedicated to Saint Stephen and belongs to the Koper Diocese. Within the urban area of Postojna, the church dedicated to the Prophet Daniel in the hamlet of Zalog and the chapel dedicated to Saint Lazarus at the town cemetery also belong to this parish.

== See also ==
- Postojna Cave
- Planina Cave
- Predjama Castle
- Haasberg Castle
