= Betal Rock Shelter =

Cave and archaeological site in Slovenia

- Betalov spodmol
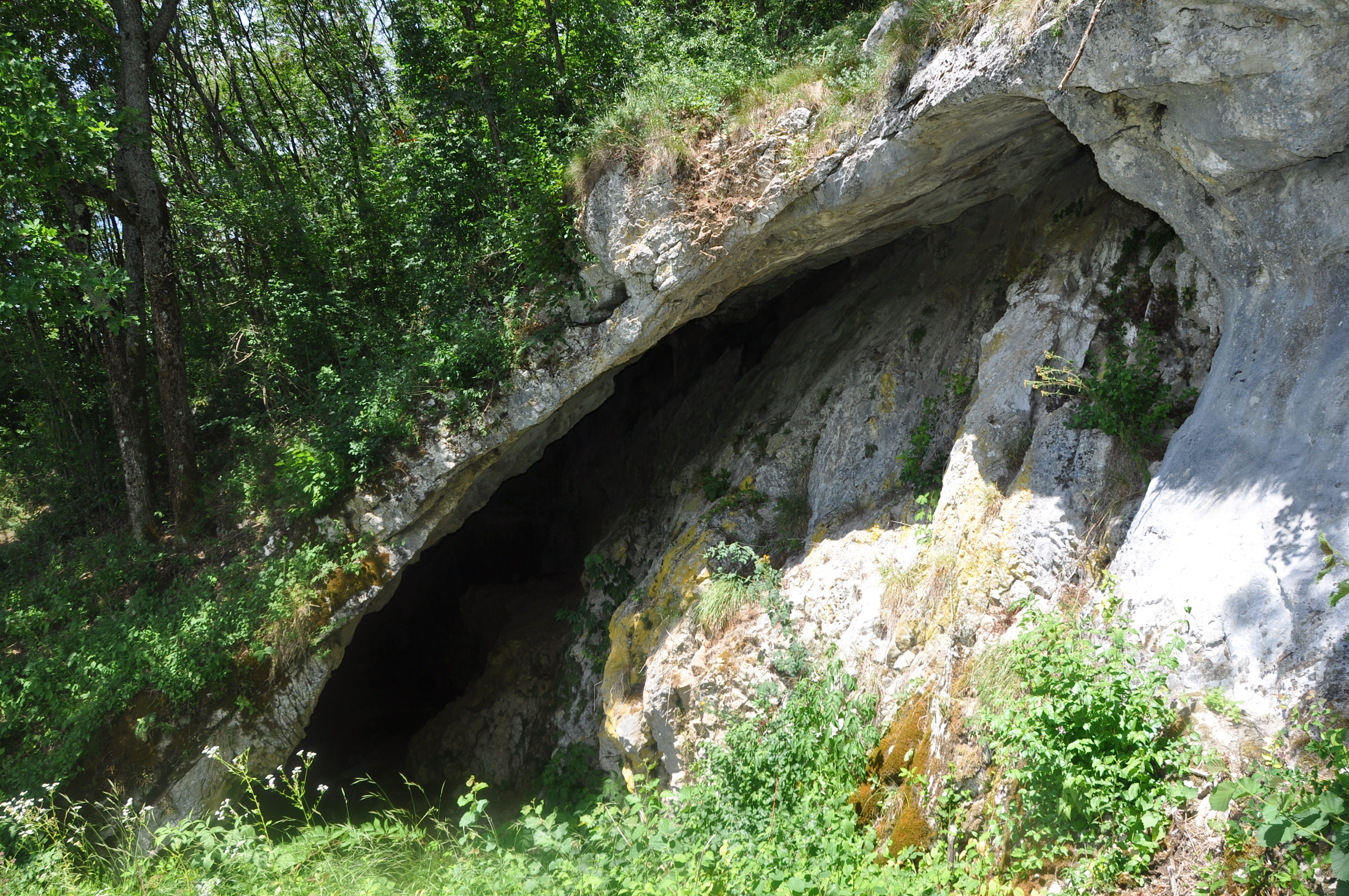
- Entrance of the Betal Rock Shelter

- Location in Slovenia
- 45°47′33.27″N 14°11′16.05″E
- Type: karst cave
- Periods: Palaeolithic, Neolithic, Chalcolithic, Bronze Age, Iron Age
- Cultures: Mousterian, Aurignacian, Gravettian
- Associated with: Homo neanderthalensis, Homo sapiens
- Location: Postojna, municipality
- Region: Inner Carniola, Slovenia

Site notes
- Length: 174 m (571 ft)
- Excavation dates: 1932 to 1939, 1947 to 1953
- Archaeologists: Franco Anelli, Srečko Brodar

The Betal Rock Shelter (Slovene: Betalov spodmol), a karst cave located on the south-eastern edge of the Lower Pivka Valley on a slope just above the road from Postojna to Bukovje, is a site where rich cultural sediment layers with remains of stone tools, artifacts, and numerous fossilized bones of contemporary animals were found. Its entrance was formed by the collapse of the 174 m (571 ft) long cave's ceiling, carved out by the waters of the Pivka River.

The first excavations were carried out by Franco Anelli from 1933 to 1939. He excavated both in the cave and in front of it and found many Palaeolithic artifacts and numerous faunal remains, although this work remained mainly unpublished. Systematic recording of the archaeological sequence was begun anew by Srečko Brodar from 1947 to 1953. In the more than 10-meter (33 ft) deep profile of eight cultural horizons, five separate strata revealed the bones of over 2,400 animals and stone tools. However, much of the material in the Late Pleistocene and early Holocene sediments found by Anelli is of limited value for scientific research and cannot be put into its correct stratigraphic context because the excavation records of these layers have been lost.

The oldest strata are attributed to the warm Mindel-Riss interglacial period followed by the Riss glaciation period, that consisted of rock debris mixed with loam and pieces of sinter. In it proto-Mousterian stone tools and the fossilized bones of a Deninger's bear have been found, dated to an age of 300,000 years. The next strata of red loam and debris contained faunal bone fossils from cave bear (Ursus spelaeus), wolf, the Alpine marmot, Merck's rhinoceros, the cave hyena, wild boar, and elk. The stone tool assemblage discovered in this stratum has been assigned to the Homo neanderthalensis Mousterian culture. The following strata also held Pleistocene faunal remains, particularly those of the Alpine marmot, of reindeer and cave bear. The presence of these fossils points to a deposition during the last glacial period, the Würm glaciation, which lasted from 110,000 to 11,700 years ago. This layer included numerous tool flakes created through flint knapping by Neanderthal occupants and modern humans, who account for the few tools of the Gravettian culture. The uppermost stratum includes Neolithic tools and the fossilized bones of wild boar, wolf, and beaver, whose presence suggests the establishment of the most recent Holocene climate. The top coat of this stratum carried Bronze Age and Iron Age tools, artifacts, pottery shards, and the skeletal remains of domesticated animals.

The Betal Rock Shelter has been declared a monument of local importance of Slovenia and was added to the national Register of Immovable Cultural Heritage under number 859 on December 22, 1984.

== Gallery ==
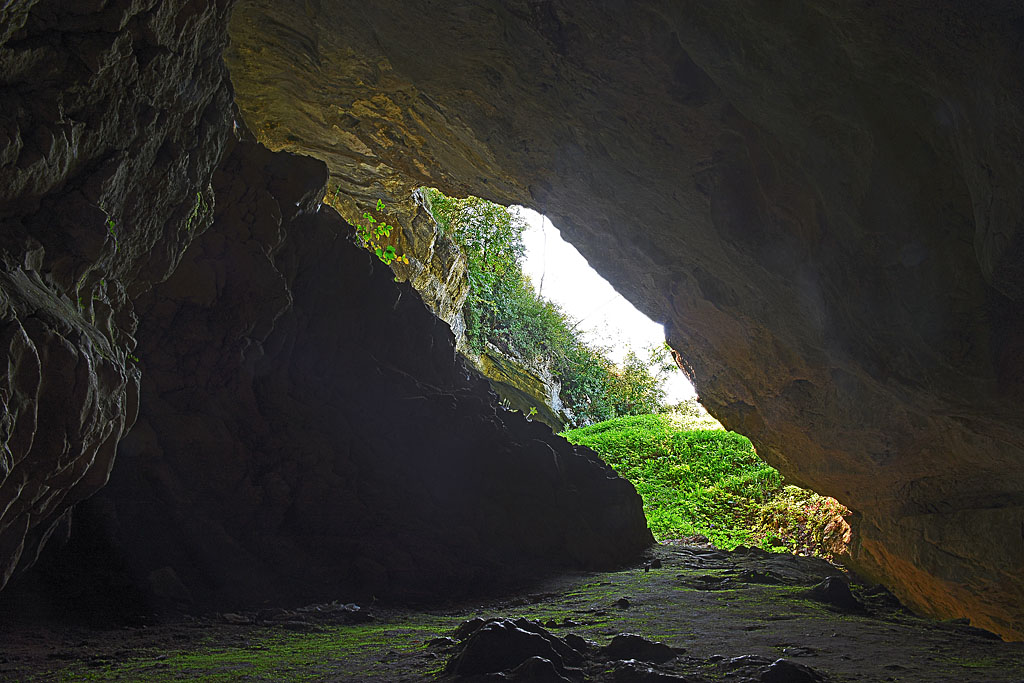
Inside the Betal Rock Shelter

== See also ==
- Postojna Cave
