= Olševa =

Mountain in Slovenia

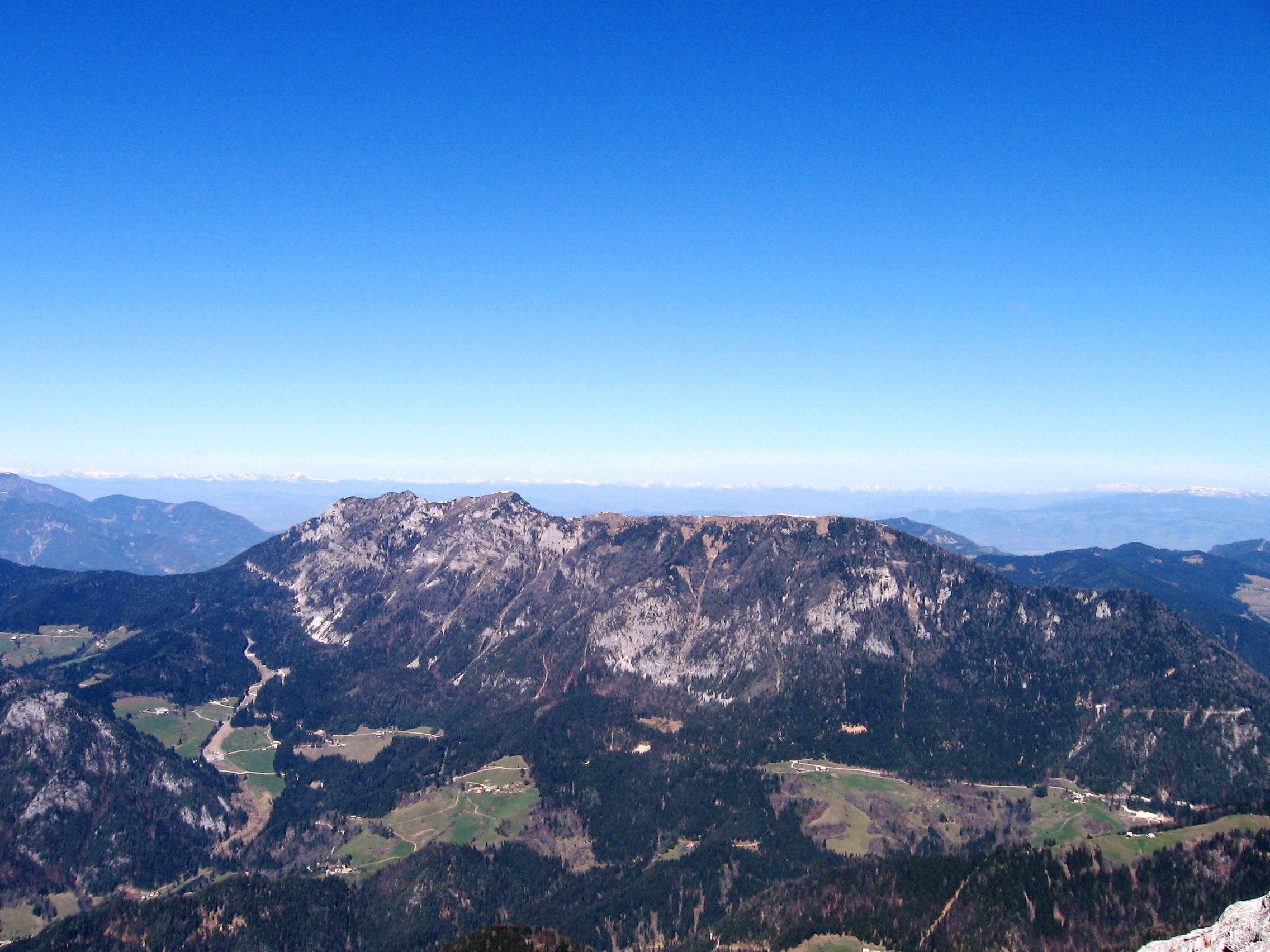
- Olševa

Highest point
- Elevation: 1,929 m (6,329 ft)
- Prominence: 590 m (1,940 ft)
- Coordinates: 46°26′59.280″N 14°41′22.920″E

Geography
- Location within Alps Location within Slovenia
- Location: Slovenia
- Parent range: Karawanks

Mount Olševa (pronounced [ˈoːu̯ʃɛʋa]; German Olschewa) is a ridge mountain in the eastern part of the Karawanks near the border with Austria. The mountain separates Carinthia from Styria. Its highest point, Govca, is 1,929 meters (6,329 ft) high. Other peaks along the 5-kilometer (3.1 mi) ridge are Obel kamen on the western side, and Smooth Peak (Gladki vrh) and Pretty Peak (Lepi vrh) on the eastern part. About 200 meters (660 ft) below Obel kamen lies Potok Cave (Slovene: Potočka zijalka), an archaeological site from the Stone Age. To the southwest of the mountain, at an altitude of 1,115 m (3,658 ft), there is a chalybeate (iron-rich) spring.

== Routes ==
- 2¼ hrs from Podolševa (difficult marked route)
- 3 hrs from the lower ridge (Spodnje sleme; easy marked route)
- 3¾ hrs from the Firšt Inn (Gostišče Firšt; somewhat demanding marked route)
- 1¾ hrs from Upper Meadow (Zadnji travnik; easy marked route)

== Hydrogeology ==
Olševa is formed largely of permeable limestone and dolomite that have been fractured and dissolved over time, creating a karst aquifer―a water-bearing mass of rock whose many cracks and cavities allow rainfall and snow-melt to seep deep underground. These carbonate rocks sit in a tectonic pocket defined by the Periadriatic Fault and a set of parallel fractures; the faults act as barriers, trapping groundwater inside the massif. Because Olševa rises well above the surrounding valleys, the catchment is largely free from human pollution and has been identified as a potential source of high-quality drinking water.

Hydrogeological mapping shows that the aquifer is split into three structural blocks. Two small eastern compartments (about 1.9 km^{2} and 0.8 km^{2}) drain northeastwards towards the Meža River, while the remaining western block—despite cross-cutting faults—behaves as a single unit whose groundwater flows west beneath the Austrian border to emerge in the Rjavica Valley at roughly 900 to 1,000 m elevation. Field measurements during low-flow periods indicate that the Rjavica springs discharge around 770 litres per second on average, implying a recharge area of roughly 11 km^{2} centred on Olševa's summit ridge.

The calculated dynamic reserves (the volume of groundwater that turns over each year) amount to about 24 million m^{3}, while the permanent reserves held in the rock pores are estimated—using a conservative effective porosity of two per cent—at nearly 110 million m^{3}. These figures, together with the massif's isolation from surface contaminants, underline Olševa's importance as a long-term regional water source and illustrate how its distinctive geology shapes both the landscape and the hydrology experienced by walkers on its popular ridge path.
