= Potok Cave =

Cave and archaeological site in Slovenia

- Potočka zijalka (Slovene)
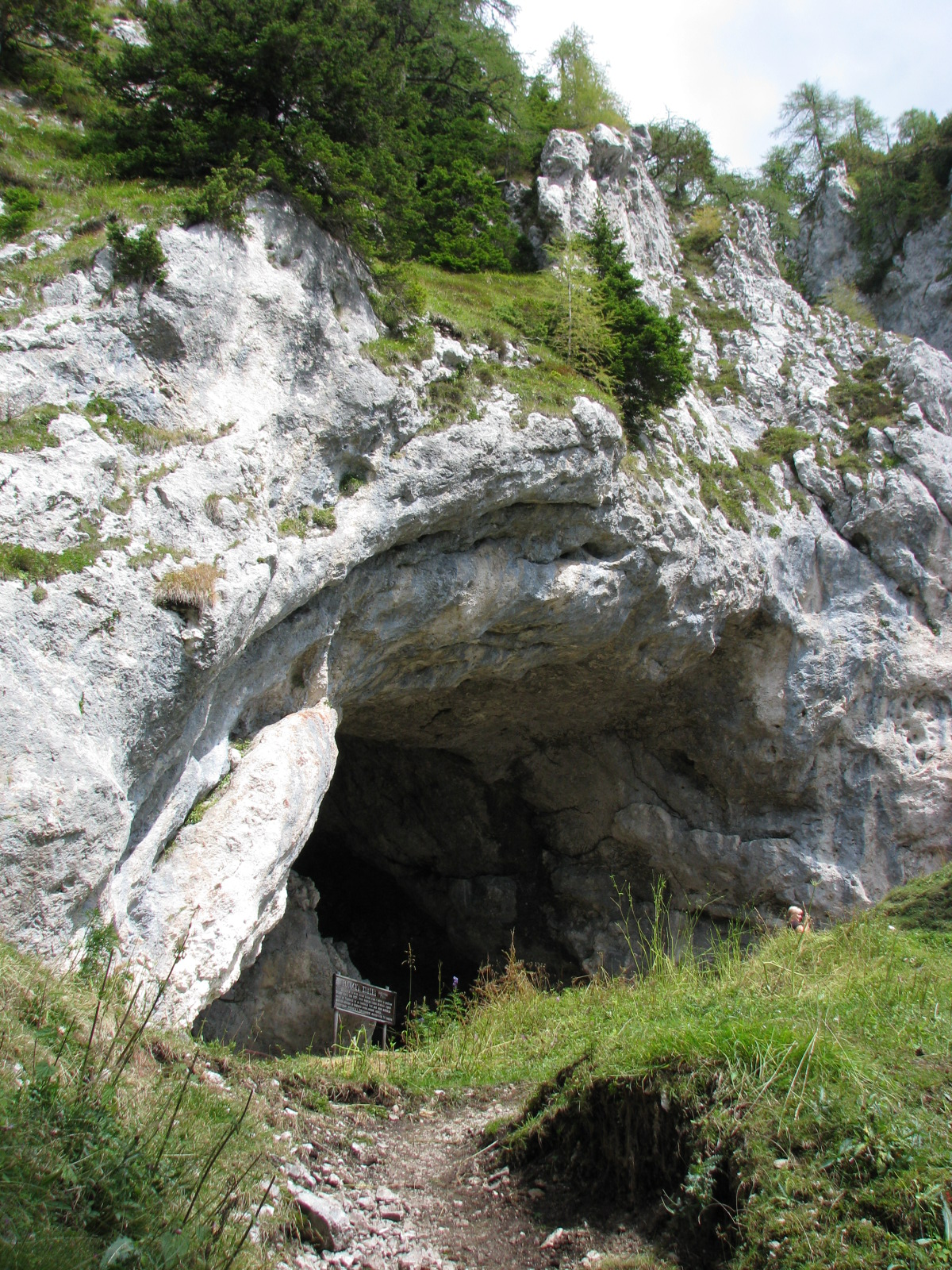
- Entrance to Potok Cave

- location in Slovenia
- 46°26′56″N 14°40′07″E
- Type: limestone karst
- Periods: Upper Paleolithic
- Associated with: Paleo-humans
- Location: above Solčava
- Region: eastern Karawanks Slovenia

Site notes
- Material: Triassic limestone
- Length: 115 m (377 ft)
- Width: 40 m (130 ft)

Potok Cave (Slovene: Potočka zijalka or Potočka zijavka) is a cave in northern Slovenia, declared a high-elevation archaeological and paleontological site, occupied approximately 35,000 years BP (before present) by anatomically modern humans of the Aurignacian culture during the Upper Paleolithic. The cave is named after the Potok Farm in Podolševa. The Slovene term zijalka or zijavka refers to a flat-bottomed cave with a gaping mouth on a cliff face. Systematic excavations were carried out from 1928 through 1935 by Slovenian archaeologist Srečko Brodar.

== Location ==
The cave is located in the eastern Karawanks in northern Slovenia, on the southern slope of Mount Olševa above Solčava, at an elevation of 1,675 m (5,495 ft) in the Triassic limestone. It is 115 m (377 ft) long and varies from 17 m (56 ft) wide at the mouth to 40 m (130 ft) wide in the interior. Its entry opens toward the south.

== Role ==
There are two explanations of its role. According to the original explanation, the cave was a hunting station. According to the newer one, it was a ritual place.

== Excavations ==
After amateur excavations by Josef Gross, a medical student from Austria, the area was bought by the Museum Society of Celje. Systematic excavations were carried out on its behalf by archaeologist Srečko Brodar, starting in 1928 and continuing until 1935.

The finds from eight layers excavated from the cave included the bones of more than 40 animal species, including cave bears, wolves, alpine marmots, hares, red foxes, weasels, lynx, red deer, and chamois, and muskox teeth, as well as 123 arrowheads, one of the world's oldest sewing needles, and a bone flute made from a bear mandible.

== Exhibits ==
In a village near the cave, a permanent exhibit is open for tourists at the Firšt Inn and Museum in the Logar Valley. The other finds can be seen at the Celje Regional Museum. Unfortunately much of the collection was destroyed during World War II in 1945 Allied bombing raids.

== Gallery ==
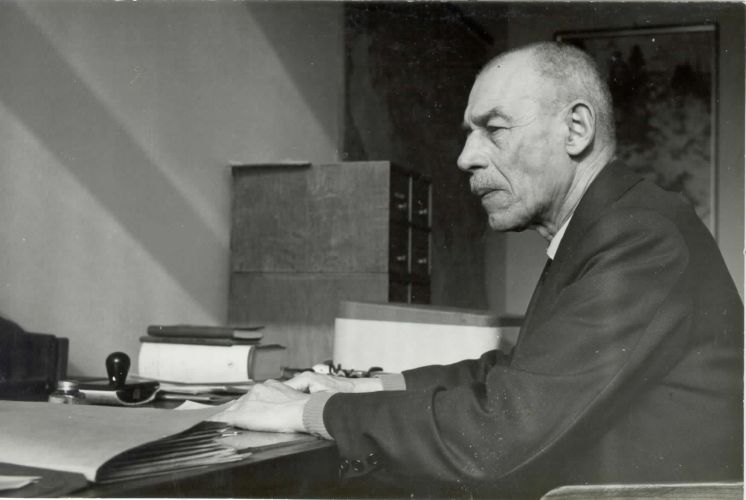
Srečko Brodar

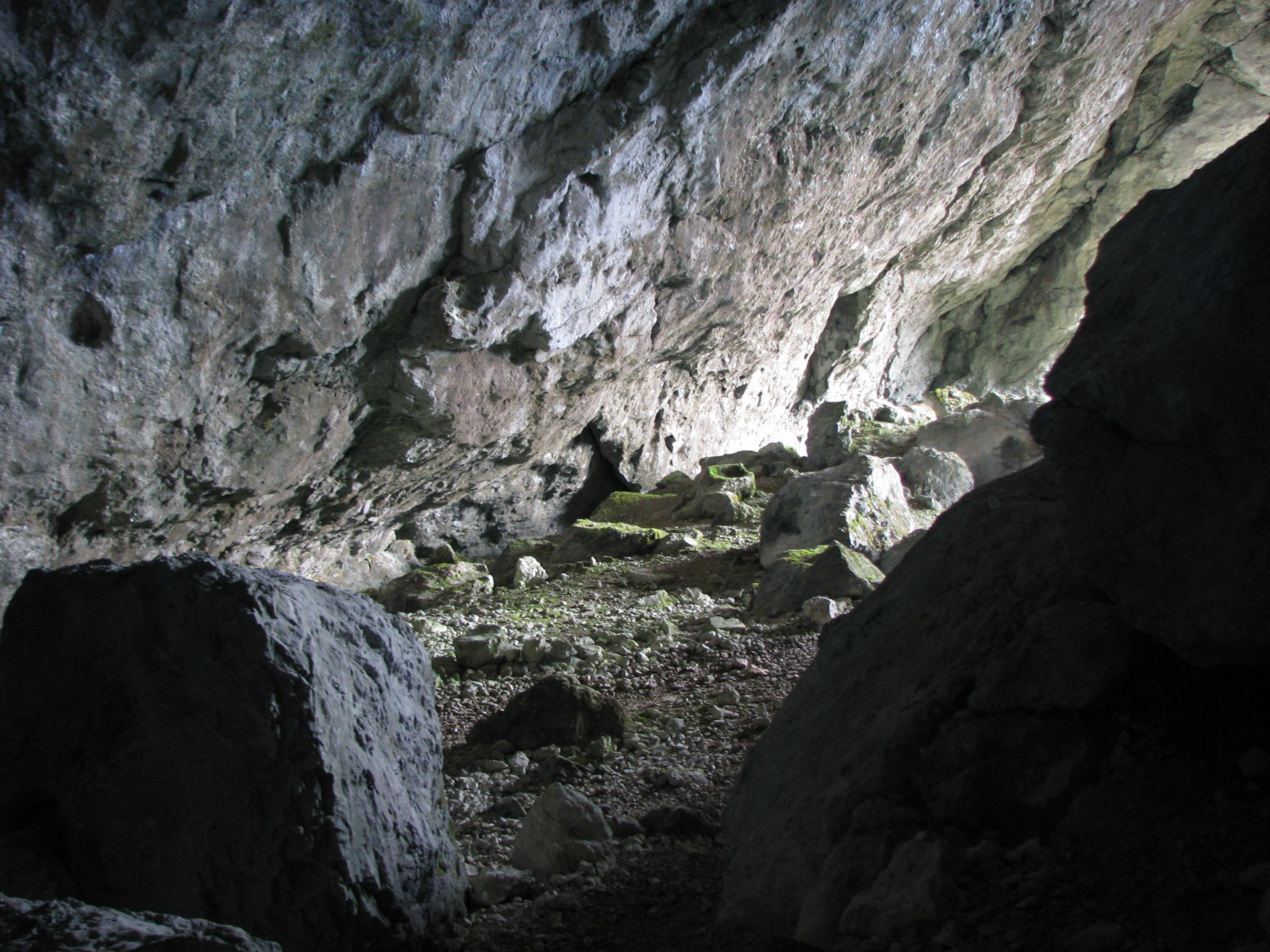
Inside Potok Cave

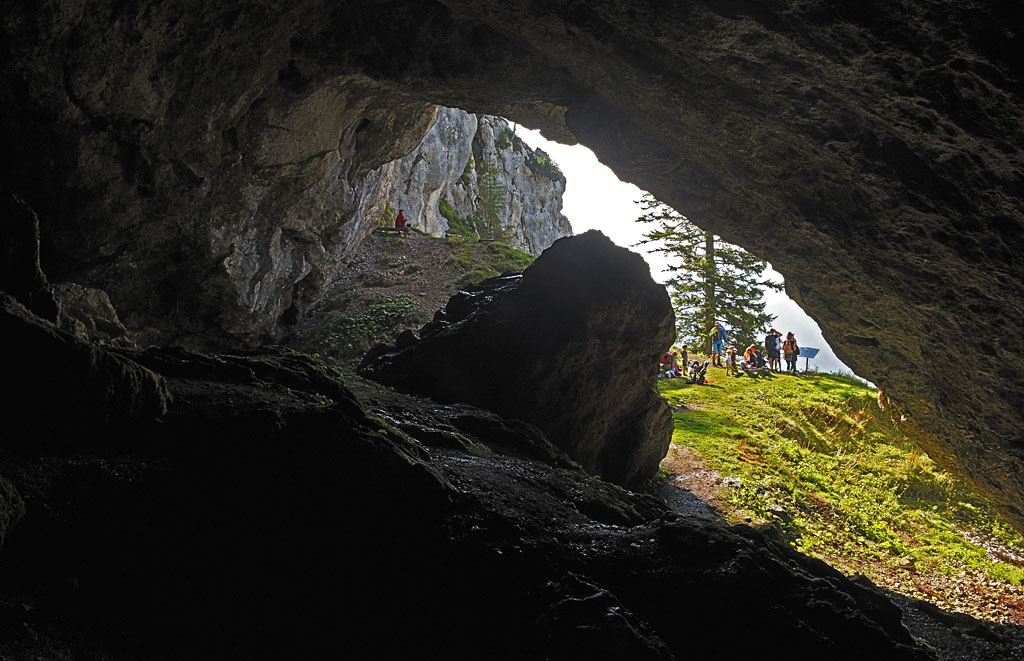
Inside Potok Cave

== See also ==
- Nevlje
