= Srečko Brodar =

Slovenian archaeologist

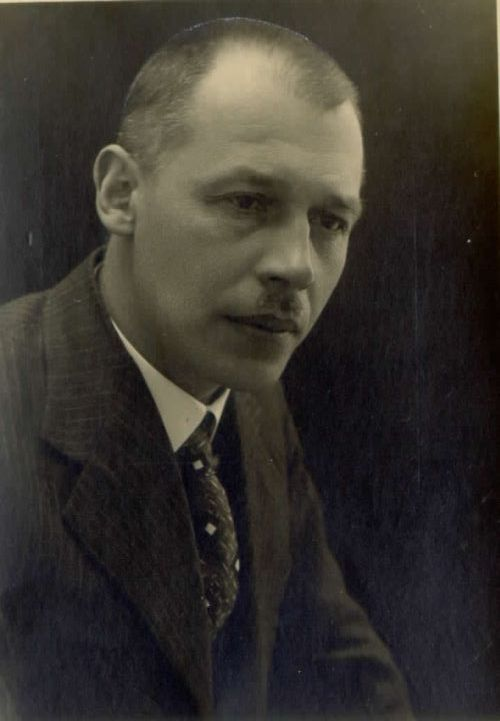
- Srečko Brodar in the 1930s
- Born: Felix Brodar; May 6, 1893; Ljubljana, Austria-Hungary
- Died: April 27, 1987 (aged 93); Ljubljana, Slovenia, Yugoslavia
- Occupation: Archaeologist

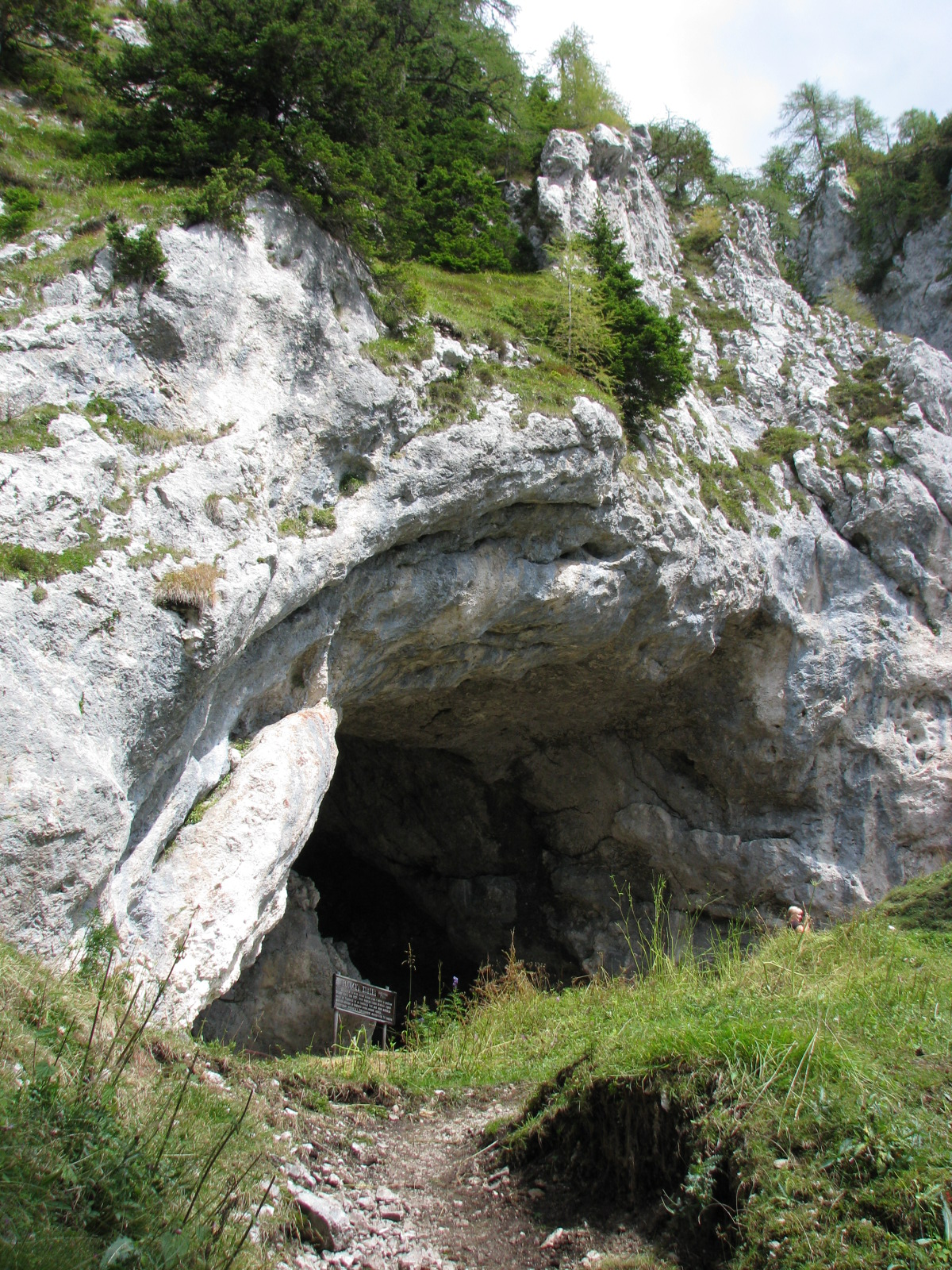
Entrance to Potok Cave, a cave in the Eastern Karawanks, where the remains of a human residence dated to the Aurignacian (40,000 to 30,000 BP) were found by Srečko Brodar in the 1920s and 1930s. This marks the beginning of Paleolithic research in Slovenia.

Srečko Brodar (May 6, 1893 – April 27, 1987) was a Slovene archaeologist, internationally best known for excavation of Potok Cave (Slovene: Potočka zijalka), an Upper Palaeolithic cave site in northern Slovenia.

== Life ==
Brodar was born in Ljubljana, the illegitimate son of Frančiška Brodar, and baptized Felix Brodar (Srečko is a Slovenized equivalent of Felix). Brodar studied natural science as the main subject, and physics and mathematics as auxiliary subjects, at the University of Vienna. In 1915, he started fighting in the First World War on the Isonzo Front, where he received a serious elbow injury. He graduated from the University of Zagreb in 1920. Beginning in 1921, he taught at Celje Grammar School, and in 1939 received his PhD in geology and paleontology from the University of Ljubljana. In 1946, he became a professor there, serving as the chair of Archaeological Department until retirement. Brodar was the director of the Institute of Archaeology at the Slovenian Academy of Sciences and Arts, and a member of the International Union for Prehistoric and Protohistoric Sciences. His son Mitja Brodar (1921–2012) was also a noted archaeologist.

== Work ==
In 1928, he became famous with the excavation of Potok Cave (Slovene: Potočka zijalka) and five other Palaeolithic sites in Slovenia, demonstrating the link between the Palaeolithic cultures of the eastern Alps and those of the Pannonian Plain and northern Italy.

After World War II, Brodar's research focused on Betal Rock Shelter (Betalov spodmol), a multiperiod prehistoric site near Postojna in southwest Slovenia. He also discovered the first Mesolithic sites in Slovenia, such as Špehovka Cave.

== Awards ==
- 1949 Prešeren Award for excavations at Betal Rock Shelter.
- 1960 Prešeren Award for excavations at Črni Kal
- 1974 Kidrič Award
