= List of castles in Slovenia =

This is a list of castles in Slovenia.

== A ==
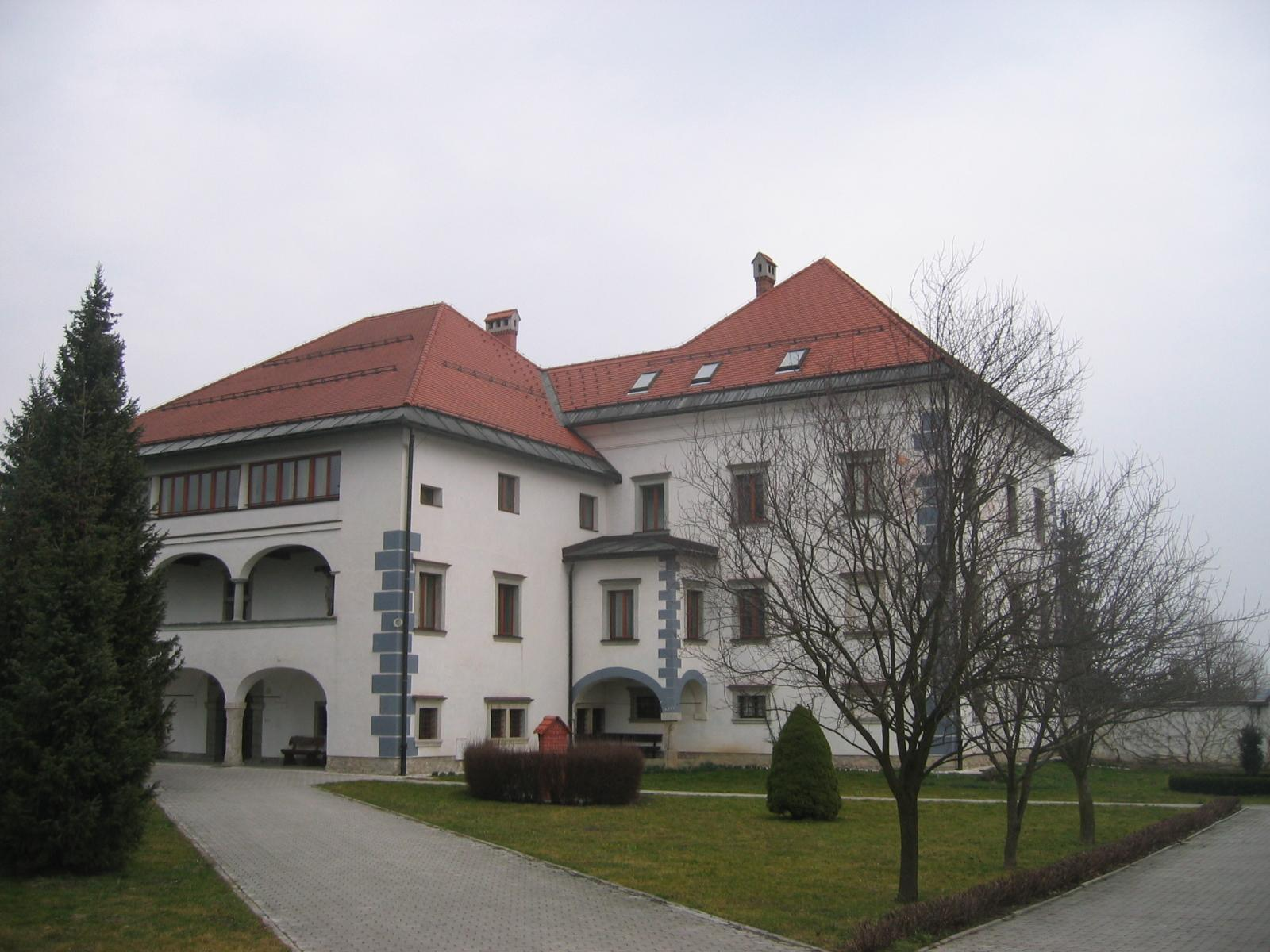
Ajman Castle

- Ajman Castle

== B ==
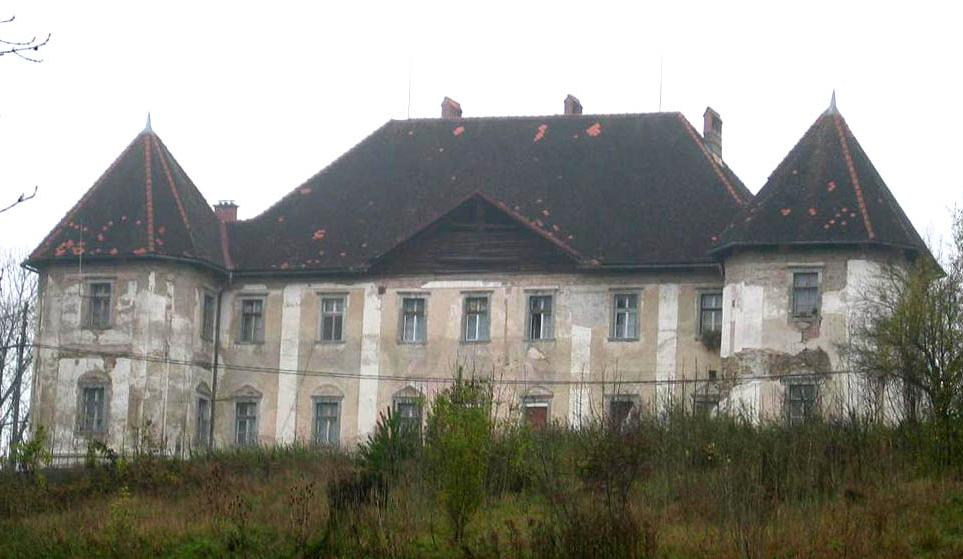
Bokalce Castle

- Baumkircher Tower
- Bela Peč Castle
- Betnava Castle
- Bistrica Castle
- Bled Castle
- Bogenšperk Castle
- Bokalce Castle
- Borl Castle
- Branik Castle
- Brdo Castle near Kranj
- Brežice Castle
- Bucelleni-Ruard Manor

== C ==
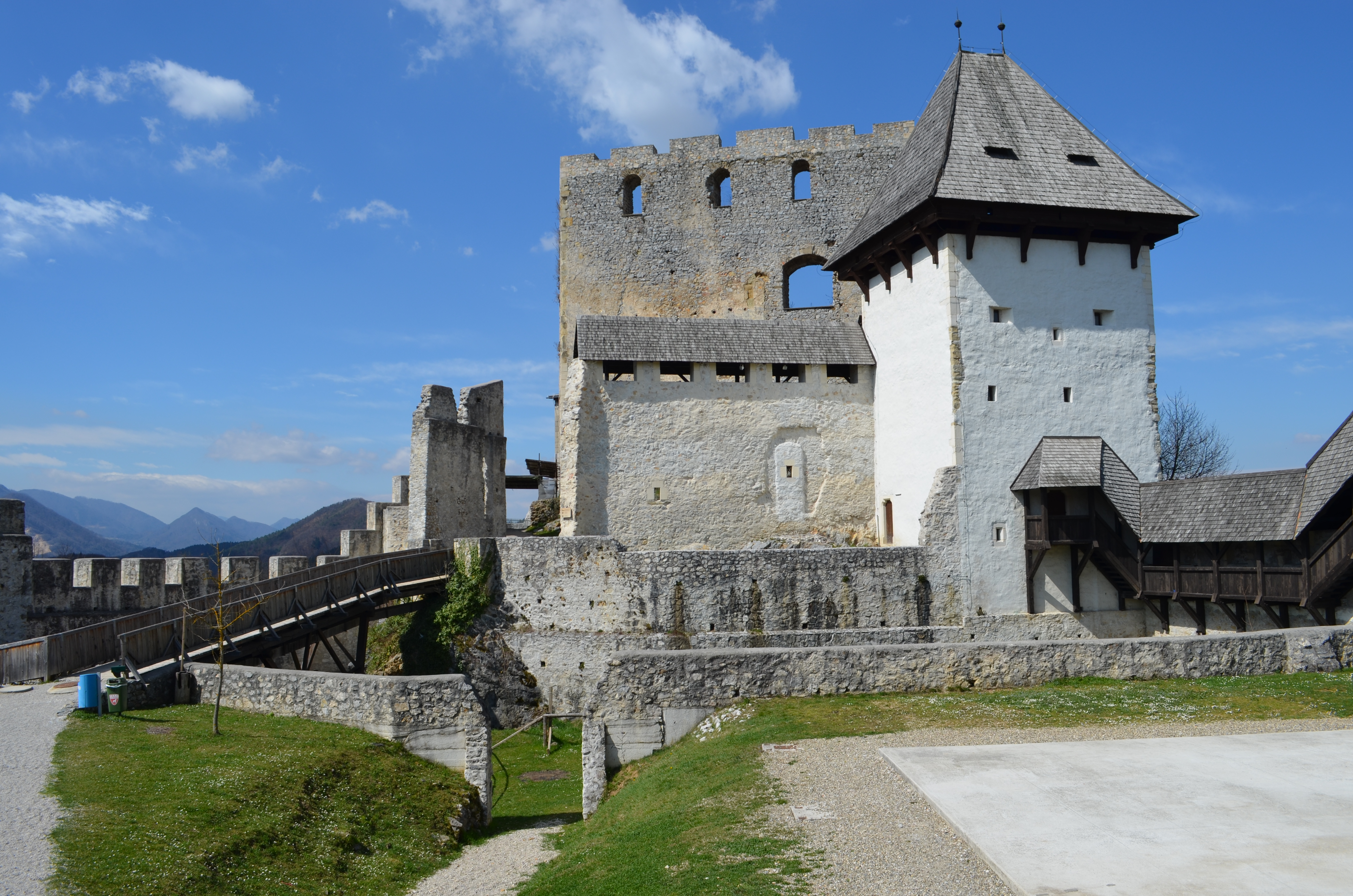
Celje castle

- Celje Castle

== F ==
- Fužine Castle

== G ==
- Gracar Turn
- Gradac, Slovenia
- Gonobitz castle

== I ==
- Ig Castle

== J ==
- Jablje Castle
- Jakobski Dol Castle

== K ==
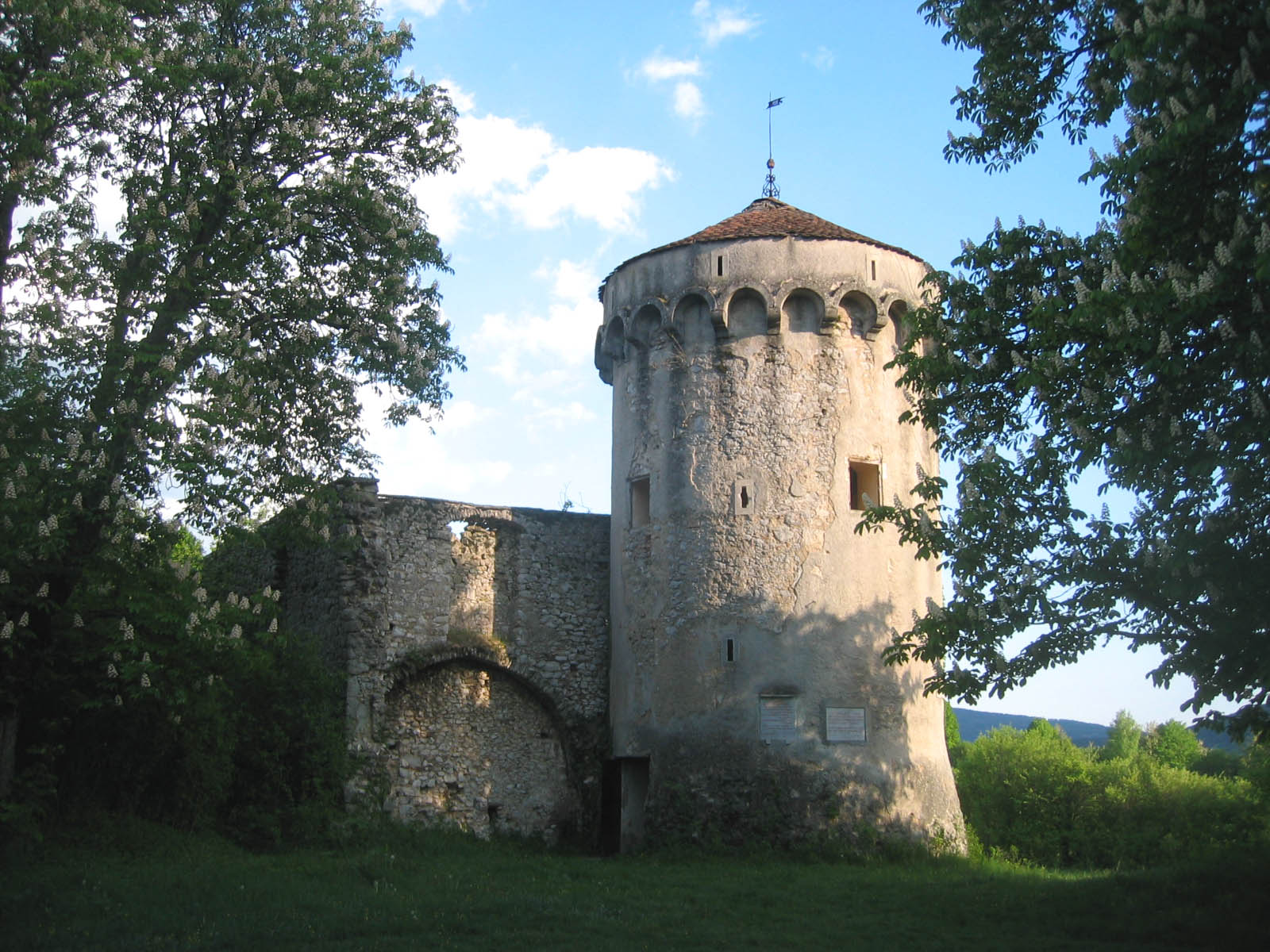
Kalec Castle

- Kacenštajn Castle
- Kalec Castle
- Kieselstein Castle
- Koprivnik Castle
- Kos Manor
- Kostel Castle
- Kozjak Castle
- Kravjek Castle
- Krško Castle
- Krumperk Castle
- Kunšperk

== L ==
- Leutemberg Castle
- Lihtenberk Castle
- Lipnica Castle
- Lož Castle
- Ljubljana Castle

== M ==
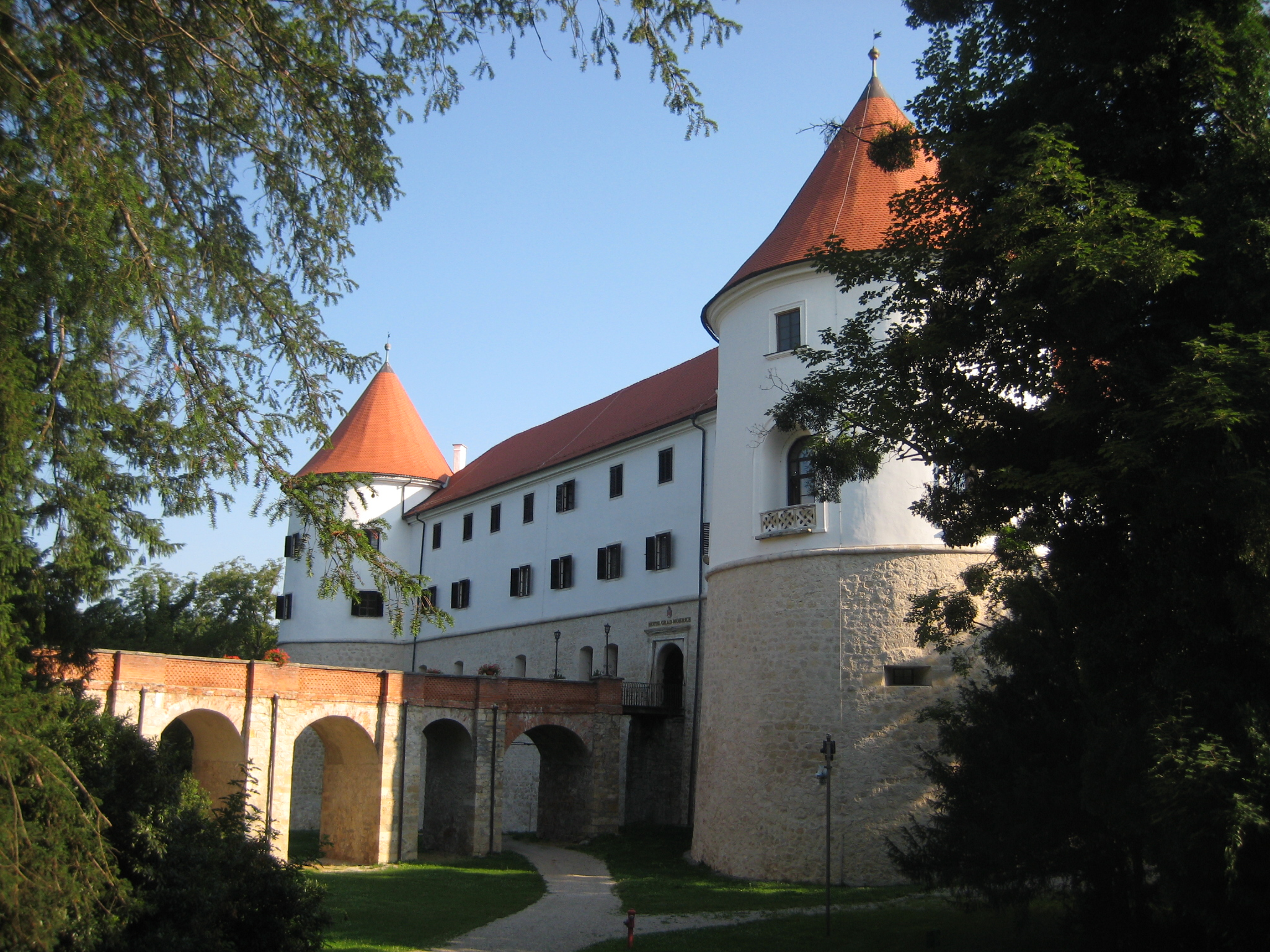
Mokrice Castle

- Maribor Castle
- Medija Castle
- Metlika Castle
- Miren Castle
- Mokrice Castle

== O ==
- Olimje Castle
- Ortnek Castle

== P ==
- Podsmreka Castle
- Polhov Gradec Castle
- Predjama Castle
- Ptuj Castle

== R ==
- Račji Dvor Manor
- Raka Castle
- Ravne Castle
- Rihemberk Castle
- Rajhenburg Castle

== S ==
- Strmol Mansion
- Strmol Castle

== Š ==
- Škrljevo Castle
- Štanjel Castle

== V ==
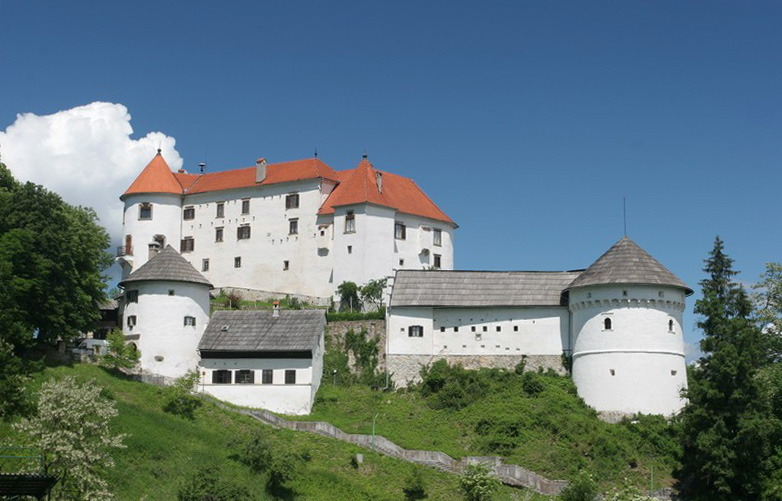
Velenje Castle

- Velenje Castle
- Vipava Castle

== W ==
- Water Tower, Maribor

== Z ==
- Zonec Castle

== Ž ==
- Žovnek Castle

== See also ==
- List of castles
