= Velenje Castle =

Castle in Slovenia

Velenje Castle Velenjski grad
- Velenje, Slovenia
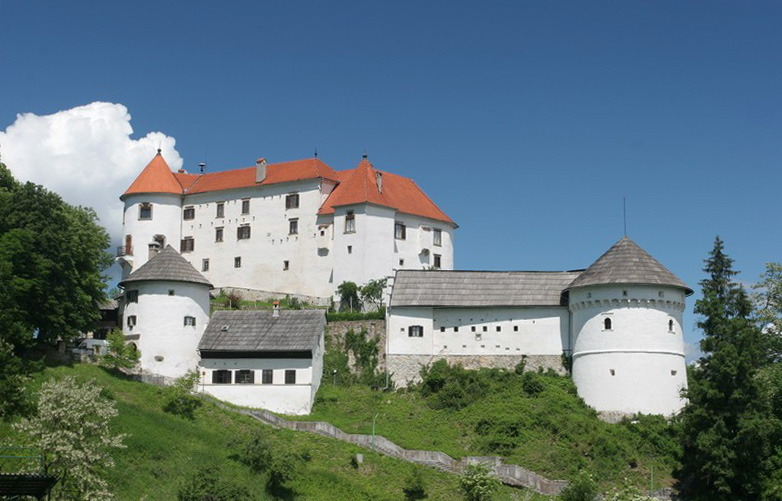
- Velenje Castle

Site information
- Owner: Government
- Controlled by: Government
- Open to the public: Yes
- Condition: Good

Location
- Location within Slovenia
- Coordinates: 46.358°N 15.108°E

Site history
- Built: 1270 AD
- Built by: Kunšperk family
- Materials: Limestone
- Events: Cultural and music festivals

Velenje Castle (Slovene: Velenjski grad) is a well-preserved castle in Velenje, Slovenia that was owned by the Kunšperk family, followed by their Ptuj relatives and the Lichtenberg family. The castle houses a museum of art and culture.

== Geography ==
The castle, above its town Velenje, is in the Šalek Valley (Slovene: Šaleška dolina), located on the top of a hill to the west of the town. Over the centuries this castle, along with two others in its vicinity, Šalek and Ekenštajn, has played a key role in controlling the routes from the Celje Basin to Carinthia. Archaeological excavations have revealed that the valley where the castle is located was the settlement of prehistoric man. Since medieval times, Velenje Castle in the Šalek Valley was also known as the "Valley of Castles" for the over twenty castles built in this valley.

Approach to the castle is from a foot track from the bus station in the town, and also by road from the old town.

== History ==
The castle was a strategically important fortress first mentioned in 1270; from it various owners controlled the routes from the Celje Basin to Carinthia. From the 14th century onward, the castle's ownership went through several noblemen. The castle seen in the present shape was fully refurbished in the early 16th century by the Wagen von Wagensberg family and also in subsequent centuries. Following the complete renovation, the castle became their Renaissance residence. In 1603, the castle was purchased by the von Sauer family and remained in their possession until 1797. In the 19th century, Karl and Bianca Adamovich de Csepin owned the castle. In 1918, the family sold the castle to their relatives, the noble Italian family Coronini von Cronberg from Gorizia, who were the last owners of the castle. It was used as the summer residence of Counts Corinini until 1943, when he was evicted by the Germans. After World War II, it became a government property. The castle was again renovated after 1957 and it now also houses a museum.

== Architecture ==
The castle has been built conforming to the topography of the land, on a rounded hill. It has a five-pronged exterior wall forming a large courtyard, which has a well and also a large flowerbed combined with an elegant arcade. A defense tower, a triangular shaped fortification, is built as part of the wall on the northeastern side of the courtyard. The residential buildings are located on the southeast corner; these are provided with basement cellars.

== Museum ==
Velenje Castle in 2026

The museum located within the castle premises has a diverse collection in its many galleries. Its unique art collections include African art (only one of its kind in Slovenia with 1000 art pieces which includes furniture, jewelry, music instruments, masks and puppets, and the carved sculptures of the donor), which was donated to the museum by the Czech-born sculptor Frančišek Foit; contemporary art by local artists of Slovenia, artifacts related to the history of the valley from the Roman period and Baroque of the Middle Ages through the centuries, including figureheads of Tito and Kardelj leaders of Yugoslavia during communist rule in Slovenia, remnants of two mastodons, a chronology of Velenje emerging as a town and Baroque artwork from the St. George's Church (Slovene: sv. Jurij) at Škale. The museum also has a reconstructed grocer's shop of the 20th century, a reconstructed inn of the 1930s, a model of a coal pit, and many other artifacts. The Slovenian Coal Mining Museum (Slovene: Muzej premogovništva) is also located in the vicinity of the castle where deep coal mining shafts are visitor attractions.

== Popular culture ==
The Velenje library holds cultural and music festivals within the precincts of castle.

== See also ==
- List of castles in Slovenia
