= Turn Castle =

Turn Castle may refer to several castles or manors in Slovenia:

- Turn Castle, Brestanica, a smaller castle below Rajhenburg Castle in the Municipality of Krško
- Turn Castle, Gornja Bitnja, a 17th-century mansion in the Municipality of Ilirska Bistrica
- Turn Castle, Ig, a 14th-century castle in the Municipality of Ig
- Turn Castle, Preddvor, a 14th-century castle in the Municipality of Preddvor
- Turn Castle, Leskovec pri Krškem, a 16th-century castle in the Municipality of Krško
- Turn Castle, Velenje, in the City Municipality of Velenje
