= Ajman (disambiguation) =

Ajman may refer to:

- Ajman, the capital of the emirate of Ajman, one of the seven emirates constituting the United Arab Emirates
- Ajman (tribe), a bedouin tribe of northeastern Arabia
- Ajman Club, football club from Ajman, United Arab Emirates
- Ajman Castle, Škofja Loka, Slovenia
- Ajman, or more commonly ajwain, a spice from south Asia
