= Raka Castle =

Castel in South Slovenia

Coordinates: 45.9278°N 15.3856°E

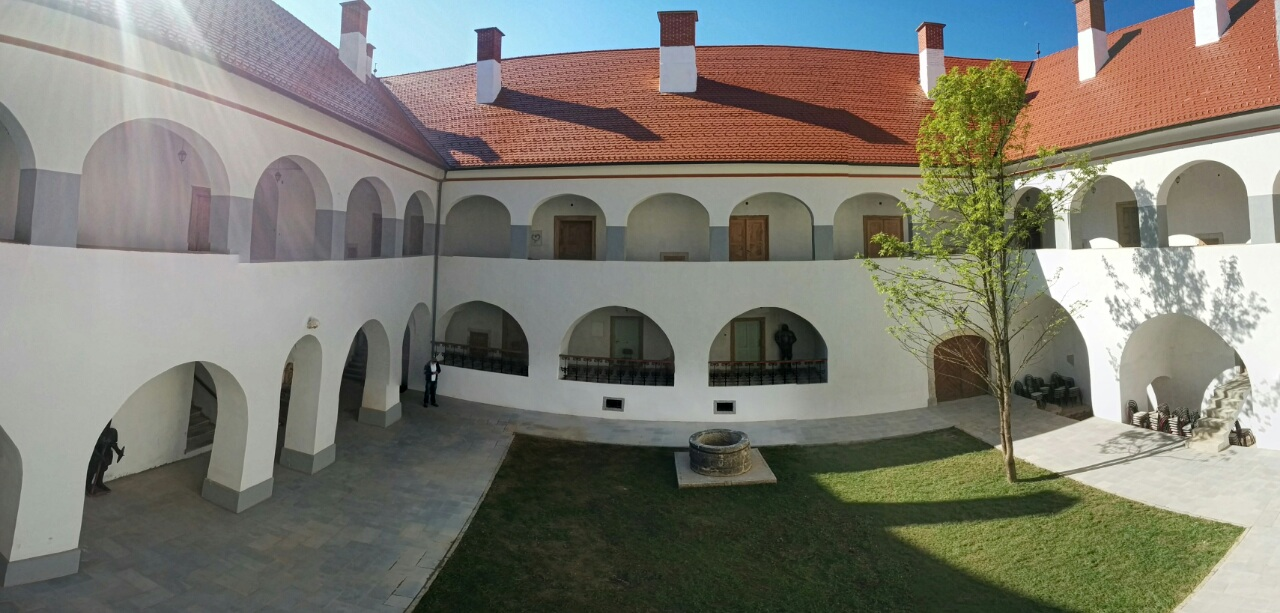
Courtyard of Raka Castle

Raka Castle (pronounced [ˈɾaːka]) is one of the oldest medieval castles in Slovenia. Raka is located in the City Municipality of Krško.

== History ==
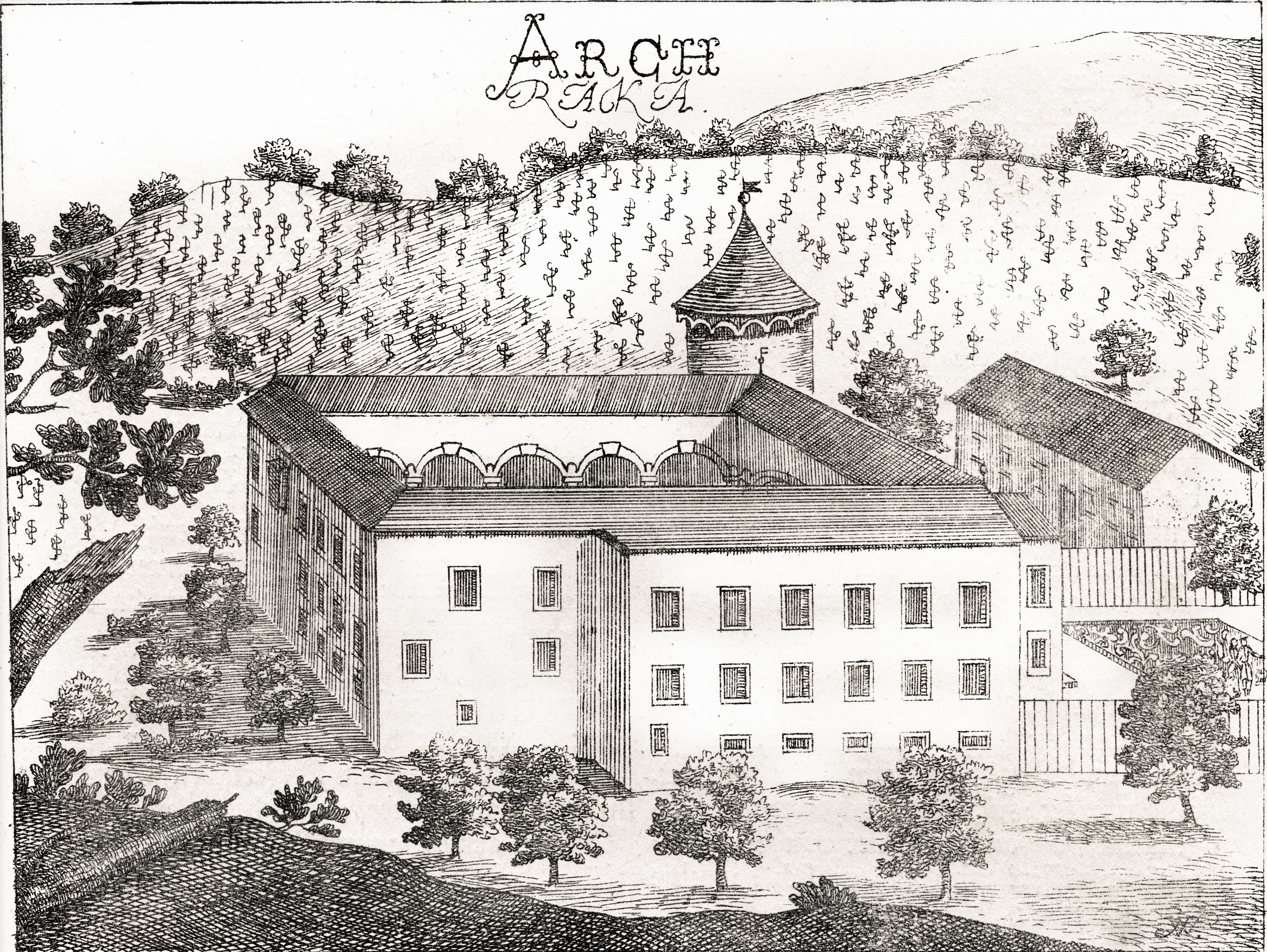
Raka Castel in 1679 (by Johann Weikhard von Valvasor)

Raka Castle (German: Arch) was documented as early as 1161 and explicitly mentioned as Castrum Arch in 1279. Built no later than the second half of the 12th century by the Counts of Bogen, it was inherited by the Counts of Andechs and then passed into the possession of the Dukes of Spanheim. The castle was sold by a relative of the Archer knights to Baron Georg von Scheyer.

The Archer knights oversaw Raka Castle from 1248 until the end of their line at the close of the 15th century. In 1501, a relative of theirs, Leonhard Herič from Kompolje in Blagovica, sold the castle to Baron Georg von Scheyer from Soteska. The castle was later burned in 1515 during a peasant revolt. In 1525, the castle and its estate were given in fief to Baron Johann Balthasar von Werneck by Archduke Karl. In the early 17th century, it was jointly owned by Baron Johann Ruess von Ruessenstein.

Later on, Baron Franz Karl Haller von Hallerstein preserved the old castle from dilapidation.

Through the 17th century, Raka Castle was owned by the Werneck barons and eventually sold to the Kajzelj family, who arranged greenhouse plots and a pond with crab breeding facilities below the castle. The old castle was preserved from its dilapidated state by Baron Franz Karl Haller von Hallerstein, who owned it from 1784 to 1825. He gave it a completely different and refined look, including new landscaped formal gardens and several purpose-built outbuildings. He further enlarged the Raka estate through purchases from the partial sale of the Studenice estate in 1800 and Dolenje Radulje in 1811.

Towards the end of the 19th century, the castle was owned by the nobleman Felix Lenck. After his marriage to a high-profile American woman, Lenck built a sawmill in the vicinity, planted vineyards, and had a piped water supply installed in the castle from nearby Polter Spring.

The castle was used as a military outpost during World War II. Between 1952 and 1961, Raka served as a municipal seat. In 1948, after expulsion from their convent, the Daughters of Charity moved into the castle, where they remained until 1998.

In 2007, the castle was declared a monument of special architectural or historic interest by the Municipality of Krško in order to protect the integrity of its landscape, architectural, artistic and historical value, strengthen its cultural testimony, present its cultural value in situ and in the media, and promote educational and research work.

== Architecture ==
Raka Castle is a quadrangular three-story building with a partial basement. It has an eleven-bay facade to the north and an eight-bay facade on its east side.

To the west and south, the mansion is surrounded by woodlands and thickets. Passage around the castle itself is possible along a narrow, untended path. One enters the arcaded courtyard through a grand, classicist style stone portal. The castle (mansion) has been vacant and empty since the departure of the Sisters of Charity in 1998. Some interior furniture, toilets, and bathrooms are intact.

The nuns installed plumbing in the mansion, enclosed the courtyard arcades with wood and glass, partially repaired the roof (which later fell into disrepair), and constructed a simple brick garage on the property behind the mansion. Only the south and the west wings of the building have basements, which can be accessed by broad wooden staircases directly off the courtyard.

In the recent past, the ground floor was used mainly for livestock. The granary and pantry, located on the elevated ground floor of the west wing, were fitted with floor compartments to store crops and with wooden ceiling beams for hanging produce, various products originating from the estate, and general useful items. Broad stone stairs, set in the middle of the east wing, lead from the arcaded corridor to the first floor rooms, some of which are partitioned. The wooden floors are covered with linoleum.

In the central part of the southern wing is a hall with a flat ceiling and a Baroque style parquet floor. One of the best preserved rooms is called Johanna's room. On the outer side a manual lift (dumbwaiter) was used to transfer food from the kitchen to the rooms. Also of interest is the food distribution area with a small, well preserved, built-in cabinet and barrier, and a distribution counter with cupboards.

Although this space is larger than other rooms, it is not central. Instead, it connects the southern wing with the western and leads to the only open arcade above the northern entrance, framing only a passage. The attic features original paved flooring in places.

The castle was purchased by Rok Mejak in December 2014.

The castle is closed to visitors until further notice. Renovation work is expected to begin in August 2015.
