= Velenje =

- Town
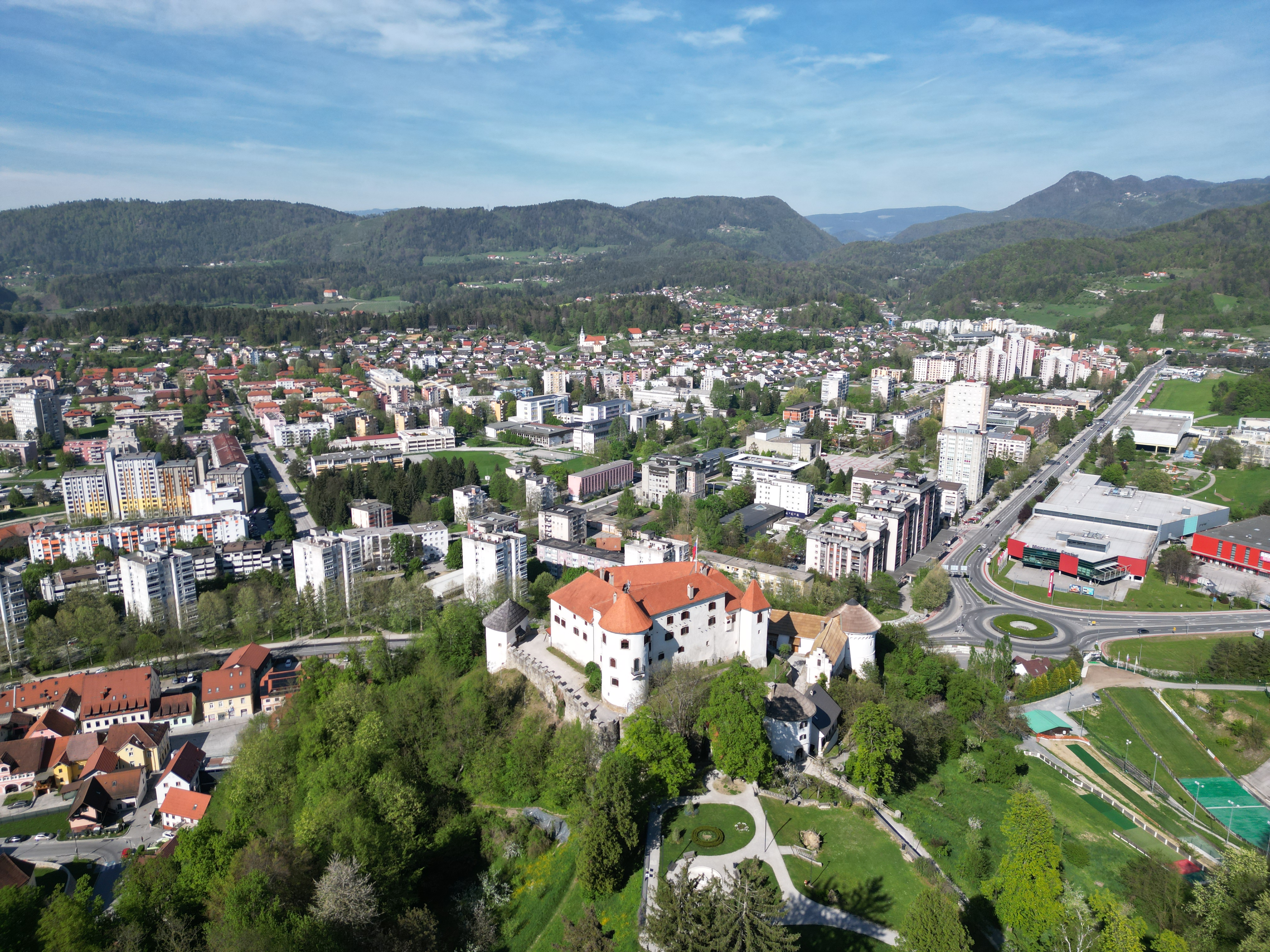
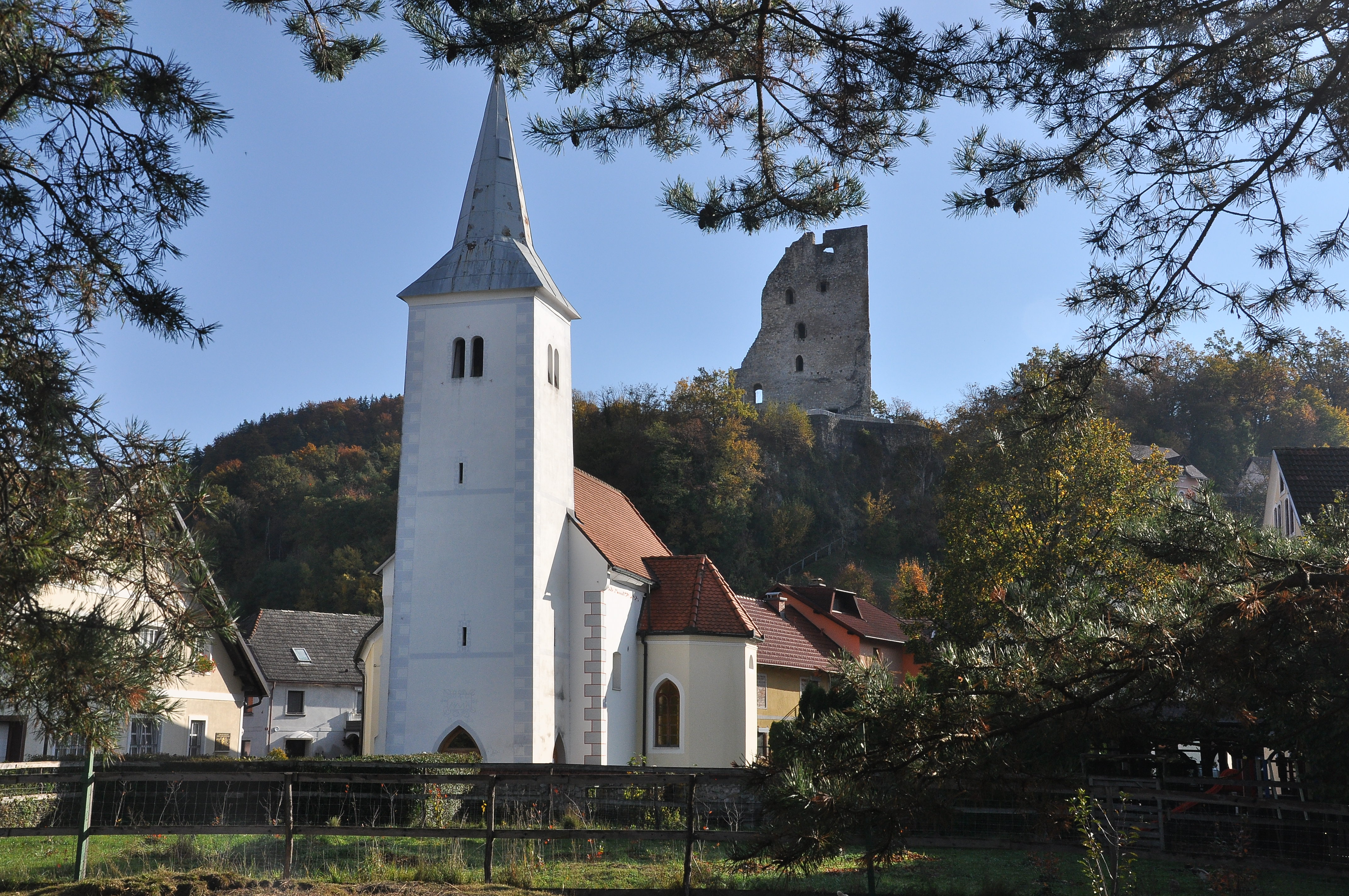
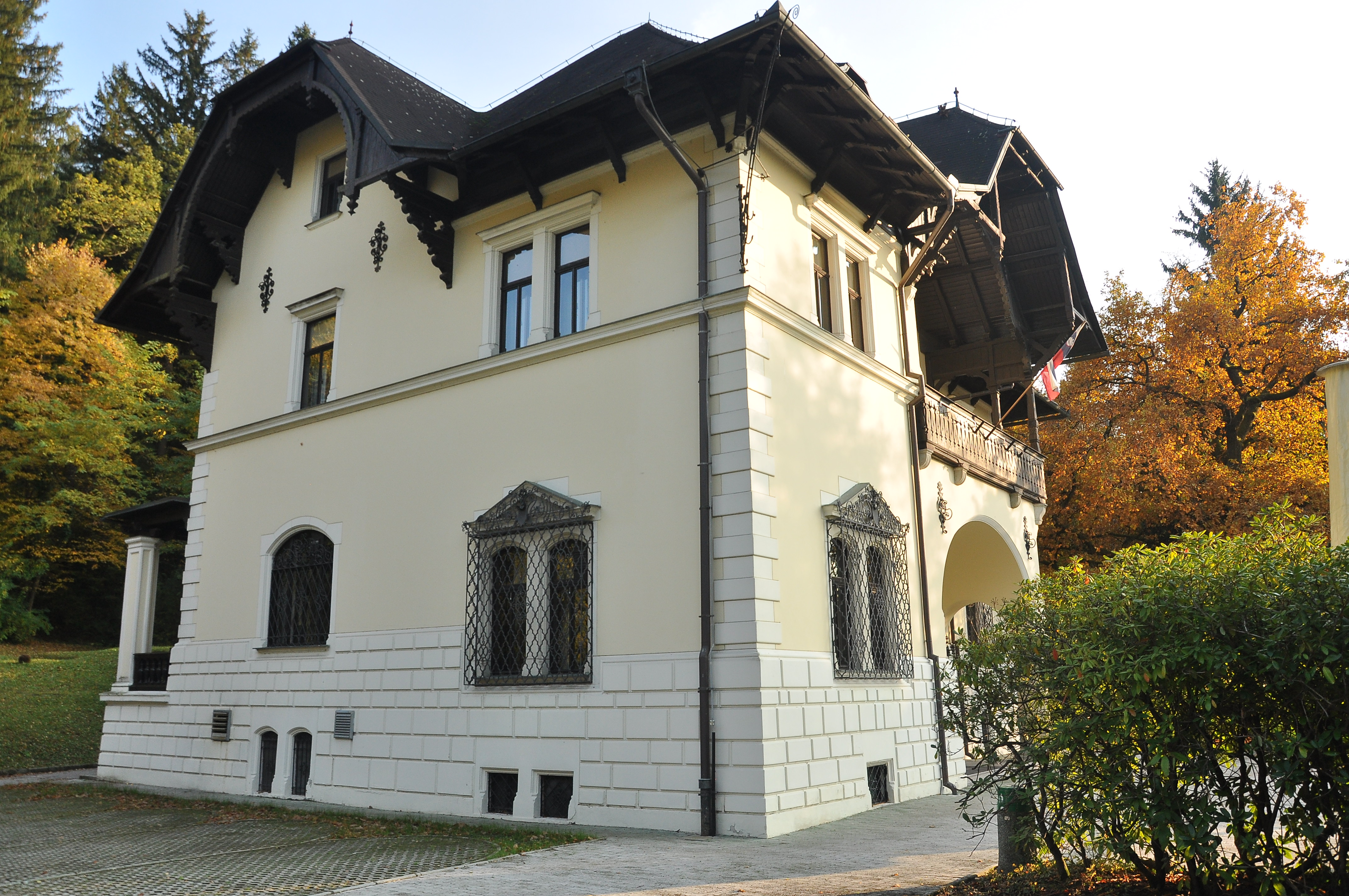
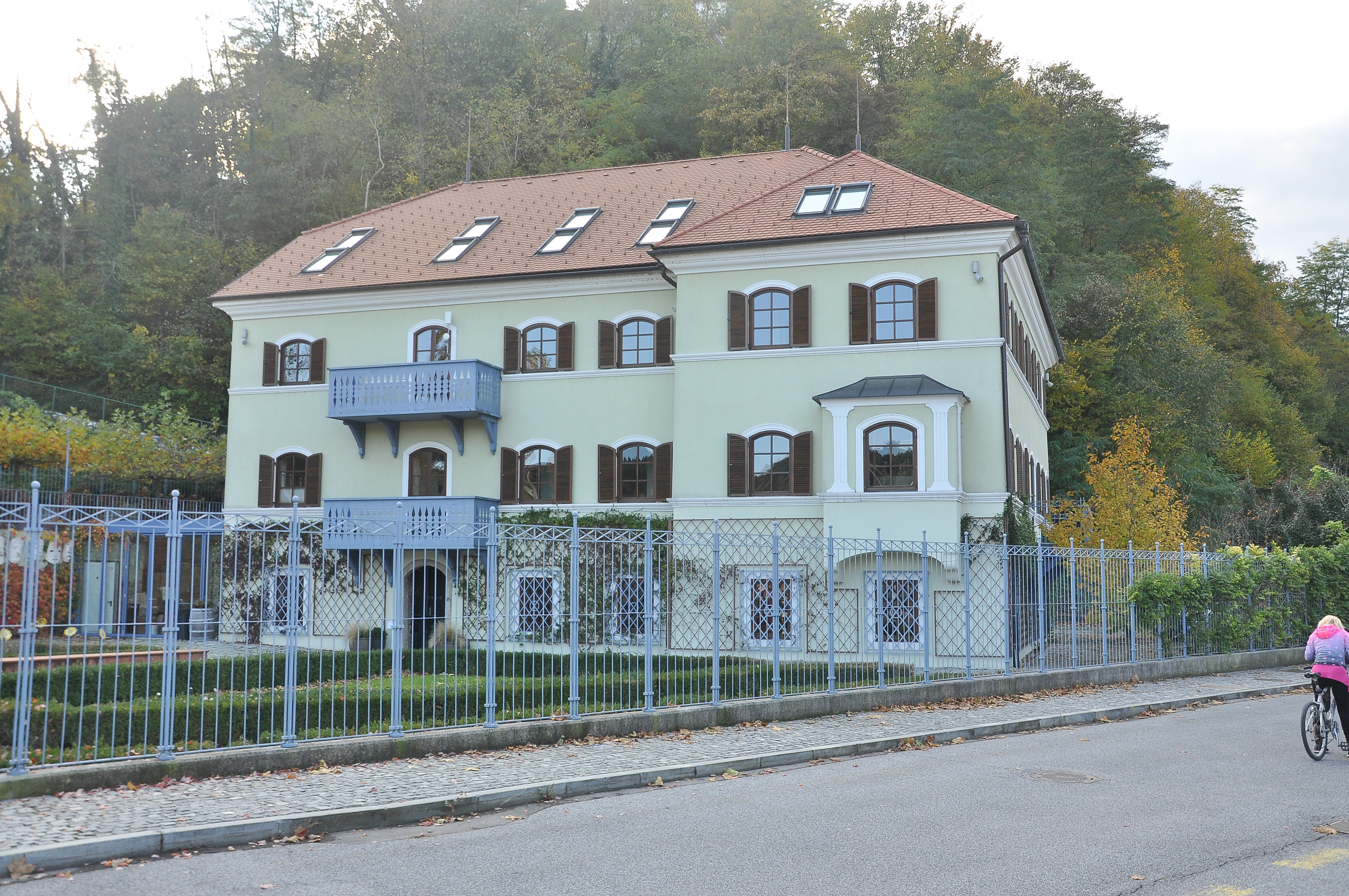
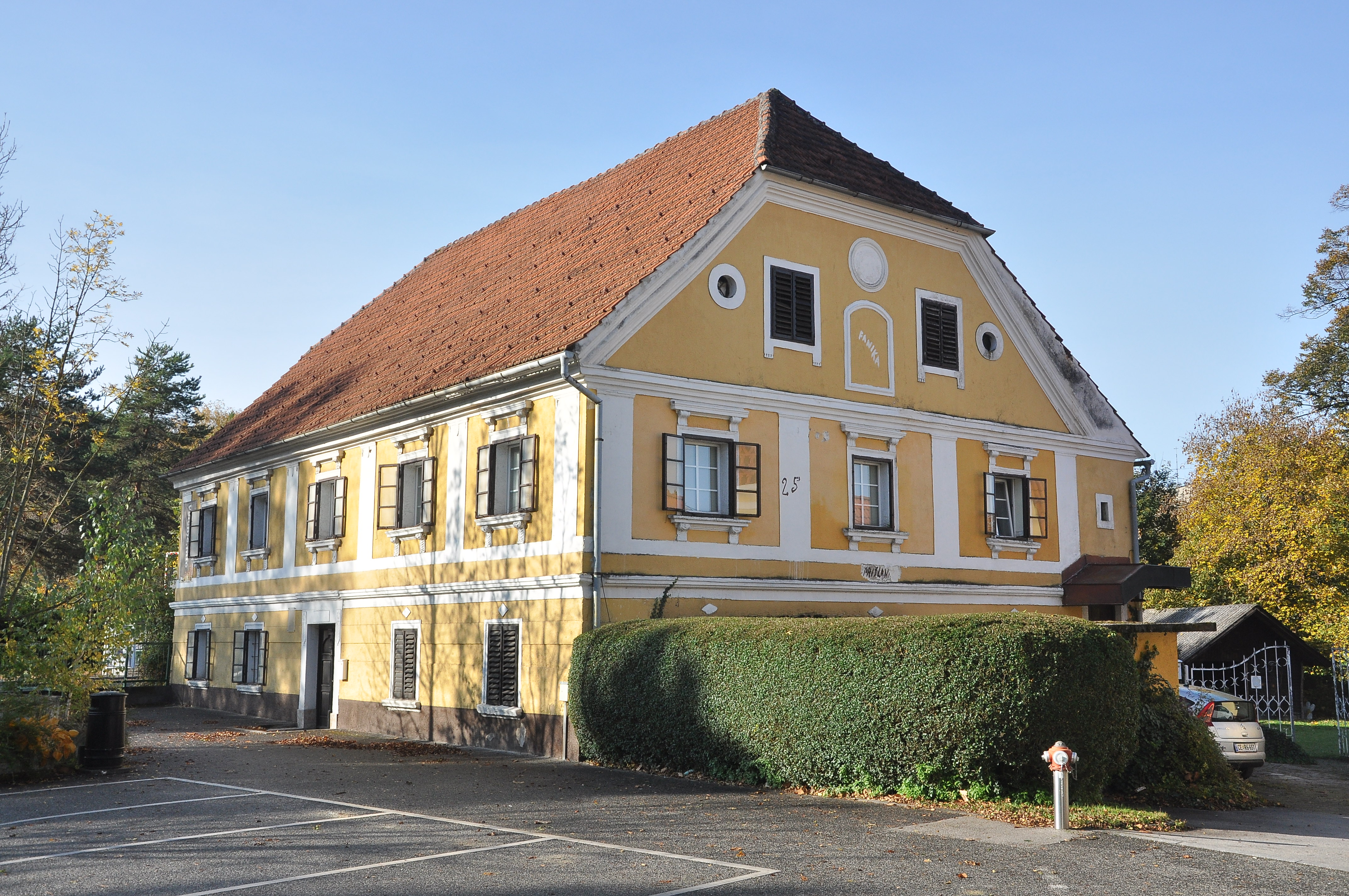
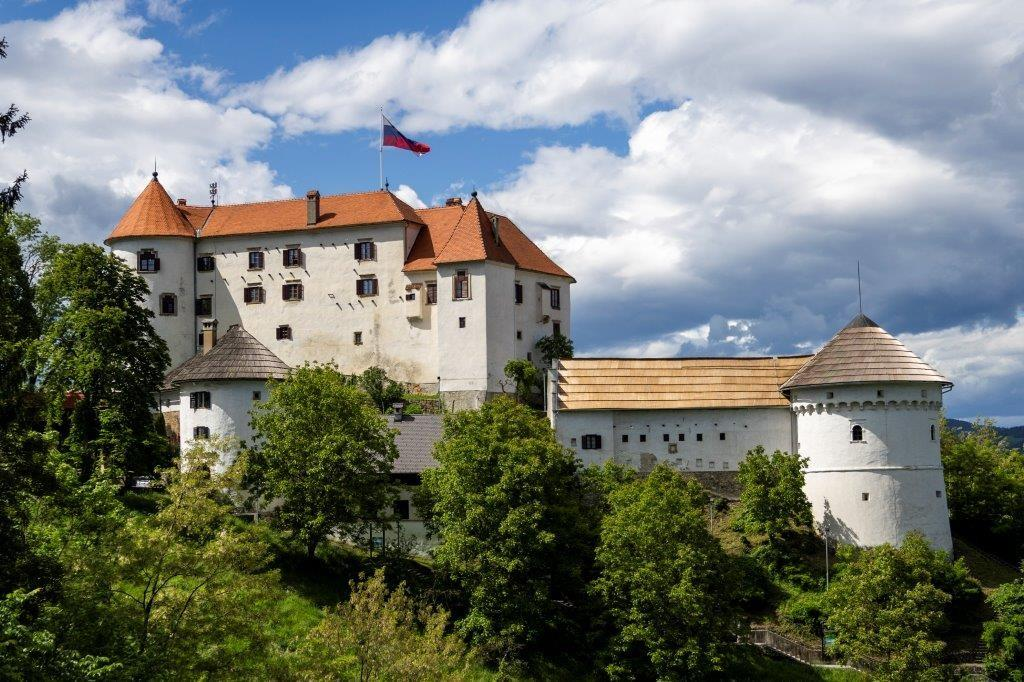
- Velenje from the air St. Andrew's Church and castle ruins Herberstein Mansion Bianca Mansion Prislan house Velenje Castle

- Flag Coat of arms

- Location in Slovenia
- Coordinates: 46°21′45″N 15°06′52″E
- Country: Slovenia
- Traditional region: Styria
- Statistical region: Savinja
- Municipality: Velenje
- Settled: 1889
- Town privileges: 1951

Government
  - Deputy Mayor: Aleksandra Vasiljević
  - Mayor: Peter Dermol (acting)

Area
  - Total: 12.59 km^{2} (4.86 sq mi)
- Elevation: 396 m (1,299 ft)

Population (2026)
  - Total: 25,617
  - Density: 2,035/km^{2} (5,270/sq mi)
- Vehicle registration: CE

Velenje (pronounced [ʋɛˈlɛ̀ːnjɛ]; German: Wöllan) is the sixth-largest city of Slovenia, and the seat of the Municipality of Velenje. Velenje was owned by the Habsburgs for several centuries, which is reflected in the exceptionally rich legacy of castles and manors. The city is located in the traditional Slovenian region of Styria, among the rolling green hills of the Šalek Valley, with the Kamnik–Savinja Alps to the west and the Pohorje Mountains to the east. The city of Velenje was officially opened on September 20, 1959, according to a unified construction plan. Velenje is marked by mining with the Velenje Coal Mine, popular due to its longwall mining method, opened in 1875 and still operating, where over 260 million tons of coal have been mined. The old part of the coal mine is home to the Slovenian Coal Mining Museum.

== Name ==
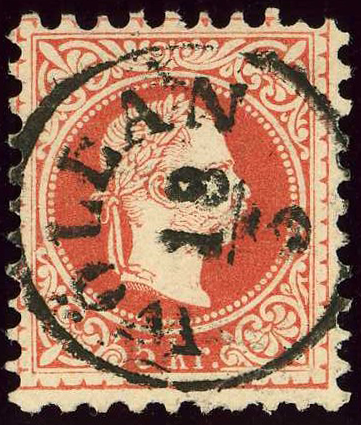
The name Wöllan was used on this Austro-Hungarian 1874 cancellation

Velenje was first attested in written sources in 1264 as Weln (and as Welan in 1270, and Belen and Welen in 1296). The name derives from *Velen′e selo 'Velenъ's village'. A less likely hypothesis derives the name from the Slovene common noun velen(je) 'pasture for livestock'. The name of the town was changed to Titovo Velenje (literally, 'Tito's Velenje') in 1981 in honor of the Yugoslav leader Josip Broz Tito. The name Velenje was restored in 1990, just before the declaration of Slovenian independence in 1991. In the past, the German name of the settlement was Wöllan.

== History ==
=== Mass grave ===
The Koželj Mass Grave (Slovene: Grobišče Koželj) from the period immediately after World War II, is located in the Goll Woods (Gollova hosta) below Big Koželj Hill (Veliki Koželj) beside a tributary of Trubušnica Creek. It contains the remains of a truckload of Slovene civilian prisoners, including many Velenje natives, that were transported from the prisons in Celje and shot on June 15, 1945. The site is marked by an official inventory sign and a small concrete plaque.

=== Modern history ===
The 1889 Old Velenje (Slovene: Staro Velenje), the old part of today's city, was a small market town with 364 citizens, located downtown at the foot of Velenje Castle. The lignite mining industry in the area contributed to the expansion of the town before World War II.

After the war, Velenje rapidly advanced and developed into a modern city. The city was planned and built in the 1950s, in the time of the Socialist Republic of Slovenia. The manufacturer of home appliances, Gorenje, moved its headquarters to the city from the nearby settlement of Gorenje. The Velenje Coal Mine, under the then-director Nestl Žganek, had by far the greatest influence on the development of the city. Words from that time that are still worth recording today: "The Velenje miners, who spend their working day underground, need large, bright, modern apartments, and lots of green spaces and parks around the housing estates!"

The central Tito Square officially opened on September 20, 1959, and features the tallest statue of the Yugoslav leader Tito in the world (about 10 m or 33 ft). It was designed by Antun Augustinčič and Vladimir Herljević. The square was once used as a meeting place of Nikita Khrushchev and Leonid Brezhnev, as well as Edward Gierek and Nicolae Ceaușescu. On December 6, 2025, the statue of Tito was decapitated.

== Geography ==
Velenje is located in northeast Slovenia, some 85 km from the capital Ljubljana, and the country's second- and third-largest cities Maribor and Celje, are 75 km and 25 km away, respectively, with Graz (Austria) around 130 km away. Zagreb is 175 km away and former capital of the Austria-Hungary Empire Vienna is 330 km away. Velenje is well connected by train and bus to other destinations, and is also easy to reach by car.

=== Climate ===
Climate data for Velenje, 1991–2020 normals, extremes 1951–2020
Month	Jan	Feb	Mar	Apr	May	Jun	Jul	Aug	Sep	Oct	Nov	Dec	Year
Record high °C (°F)	18.8 (65.8)	20 (68)	25.2 (77.4)	27.5 (81.5)	31.7 (89.1)	35 (95)	35.7 (96.3)	38.5 (101.3)	31.5 (88.7)	25.7 (78.3)	22.6 (72.7)	18.9 (66.0)	38.5 (101.3)
Mean daily maximum °C (°F)	4.8 (40.6)	7.0 (44.6)	11.5 (52.7)	16.3 (61.3)	20.8 (69.4)	24.5 (76.1)	26.3 (79.3)	26.1 (79.0)	20.9 (69.6)	15.9 (60.6)	9.8 (49.6)	5.1 (41.2)	15.8 (60.3)
Daily mean °C (°F)	0.3 (32.5)	1.8 (35.2)	5.8 (42.4)	10.6 (51.1)	15.1 (59.2)	18.9 (66.0)	20.5 (68.9)	20.0 (68.0)	15.1 (59.2)	10.4 (50.7)	5.6 (42.1)	1.1 (34.0)	10.4 (50.8)
Mean daily minimum °C (°F)	−2.9 (26.8)	−2.2 (28.0)	1.1 (34.0)	5.2 (41.4)	9.6 (49.3)	13.4 (56.1)	15.1 (59.2)	15.0 (59.0)	10.8 (51.4)	6.8 (44.2)	2.7 (36.9)	−1.8 (28.8)	6.1 (42.9)
Record low °C (°F)	−22.1 (−7.8)	−20.7 (−5.3)	−20.2 (−4.4)	−5.7 (21.7)	−3.3 (26.1)	1.1 (34.0)	4.7 (40.5)	5 (41)	−0.5 (31.1)	−5.7 (21.7)	−12.7 (9.1)	−19.7 (−3.5)	−22.1 (−7.8)
Average precipitation mm (inches)	45 (1.8)	55 (2.2)	61 (2.4)	72 (2.8)	93 (3.7)	123 (4.8)	123 (4.8)	116 (4.6)	133 (5.2)	112 (4.4)	102 (4.0)	75 (3.0)	1,110 (43.7)
Average snowfall cm (inches)	15 (5.9)	21 (8.3)	9 (3.5)	1 (0.4)	0 (0)	0 (0)	0 (0)	0 (0)	0 (0)	1 (0.4)	8 (3.1)	19 (7.5)	74 (29.1)
Average extreme snow depth cm (inches)	4 (1.6)	4 (1.6)	1 (0.4)	0 (0)	0 (0)	0 (0)	0 (0)	0 (0)	0 (0)	0 (0)	1 (0.4)	2 (0.8)	4 (1.6)
Average precipitation days (≥ 0.1 mm)	8	9	10	12	14	14	14	12	12	11	12	10	138
Average snowy days (≥ 1 cm)	3	4	1	0.2	0	0	0	0	0	0.2	1	3	12.4
Source: Slovenian Environment Agency (ARSO)

== Culture ==
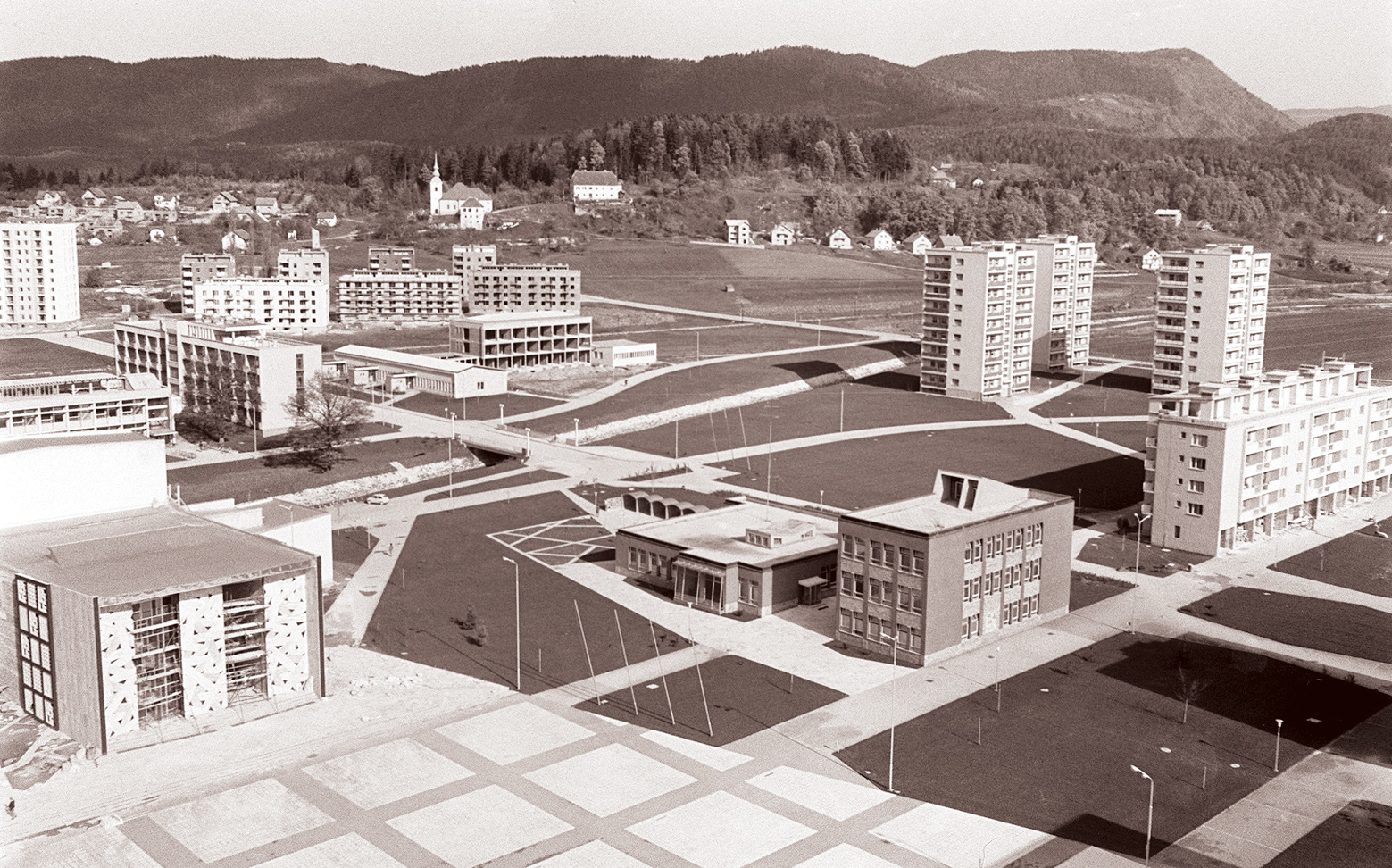
Newly built quarter of Velenje in 1960

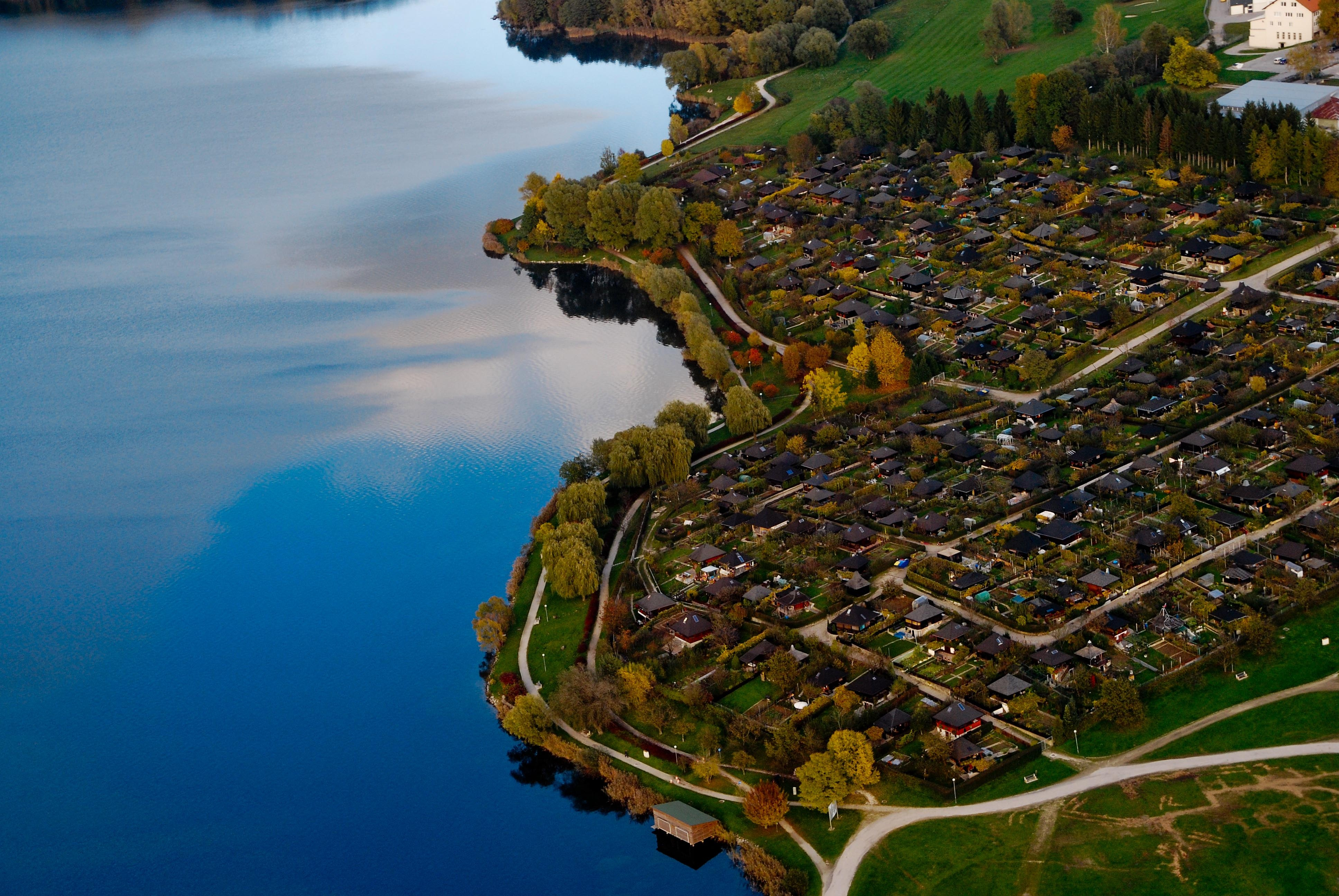
The shoreline of Lake Velenje

The Velenje Cultural Center, in the northwestern part of the square, was built in 1959 according to plans by Oton Gaspari, and opened in November 1960. Its façade was decorated with a relief by Stojan Batič, and its interior was designed by Riko Debenjak. The hall was the 1990s center of subcultures in Velenje. Today, it hosts the public institute Velenje Festival, which holds various cultural activities. The hall also houses a puppet theatre and a dance theatre.

== Economy and education ==
Velenje is one of the strongest economic centers in Slovenia, equipped with modern infrastructure. Economic development is based on the energy, metal-processing, and construction industries. The only operating lignite mine in Slovenia is located immediately west of the city. Environmental protection, craft, and trade services have been experiencing solid development. The city has three large shopping centers. These include Hypermarket Mercator Velenje, Velenjka, and Velenje Shopping Center.

Velenje is an employment, administrative, and educational center of the wider Savinja–Šalek region. It has six primary schools, seven secondary/high schools, a university, and a music school.

== Transportation ==
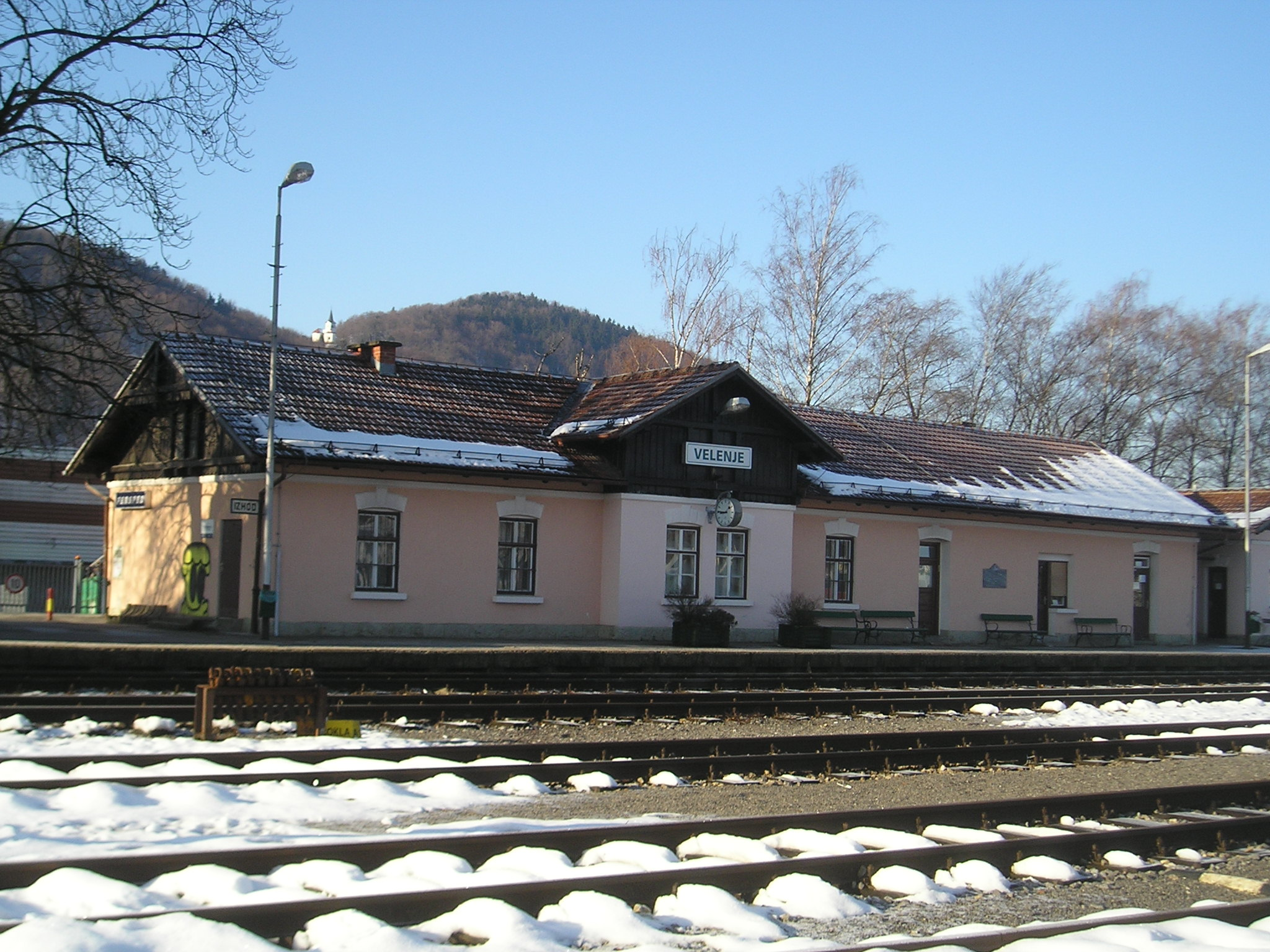
Velenje train station in 2010

The drive from Ljubljana takes about one hour. Velenje's city center is relatively easily covered on foot, or by bicycle. Bicycles can be rented from the tourist office in Villa Bianca.

There are up to 15 trains per day to Ljubljana and Maribor during the week, all of which require a transfer in Celje and take about 2 to 3 hours. Fares cost between €8 and €13 one-way. There are only four trains on Saturdays, and none on Sundays. Velenje's train station is located just west of the city centre.

Velenje's bus station is on Šalek Street (Slovene: Šaleška cesta), just east of the Mercator shopping center. There are frequent local and regional buses during the week, with up to five direct buses on weekdays to Ljubljana and up to 22 to Celje. Public city bus transport in Velenje is cost-free.

The nearest airport is Ljubljana Airport, with Graz, Klagenfurt, and Zagreb airports relatively nearby.

== Sports ==
Work in a coal mine was strenuous, but visionaries enabled miners to draft plans for a sports infrastructure that would be available in their free time. That infrastructure promoted an improved quality of life and health, despite working in harsh environments. The coal mine has always been a pillar of sports development and has created a host of sports and multi-purpose facilities that still serve people today.

Velenje holds the only 400-kilometre (250 mi) long adventure race in Slovenia, called Adventure Race Slovenia, which is known across Europe and is held every weekend in June. It was first held in 2003 by the Lake Dragon Scout Group.

The handball club RK Gorenje Velenje and football club NK Rudar Velenje are based in Velenje. The city is the birthplace of Jolanda Čeplak, a Slovenian middle distance athlete and Olympic bronze medalist. It is also the hometown of the Slovenian tennis player Katarina Srebotnik.

== Religion ==
The parish church in Velenje dates to the 13th century with 16th- and 17th-century additions. It is dedicated to Saint Martin, and belongs to the Roman Catholic Diocese of Celje. A significant portion of Velenje's populace today describe themselves as atheists.

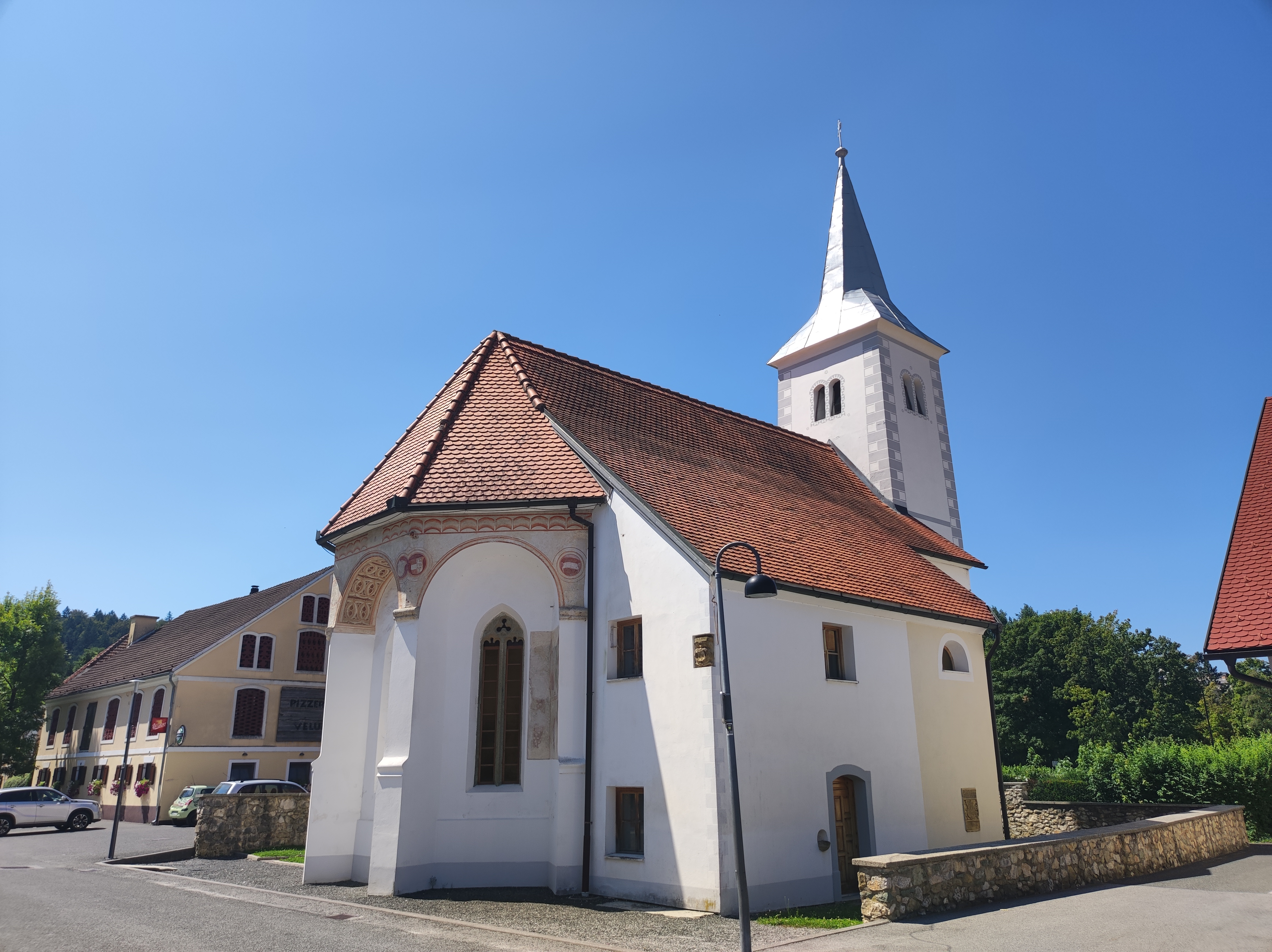
St. Andrew's filial church

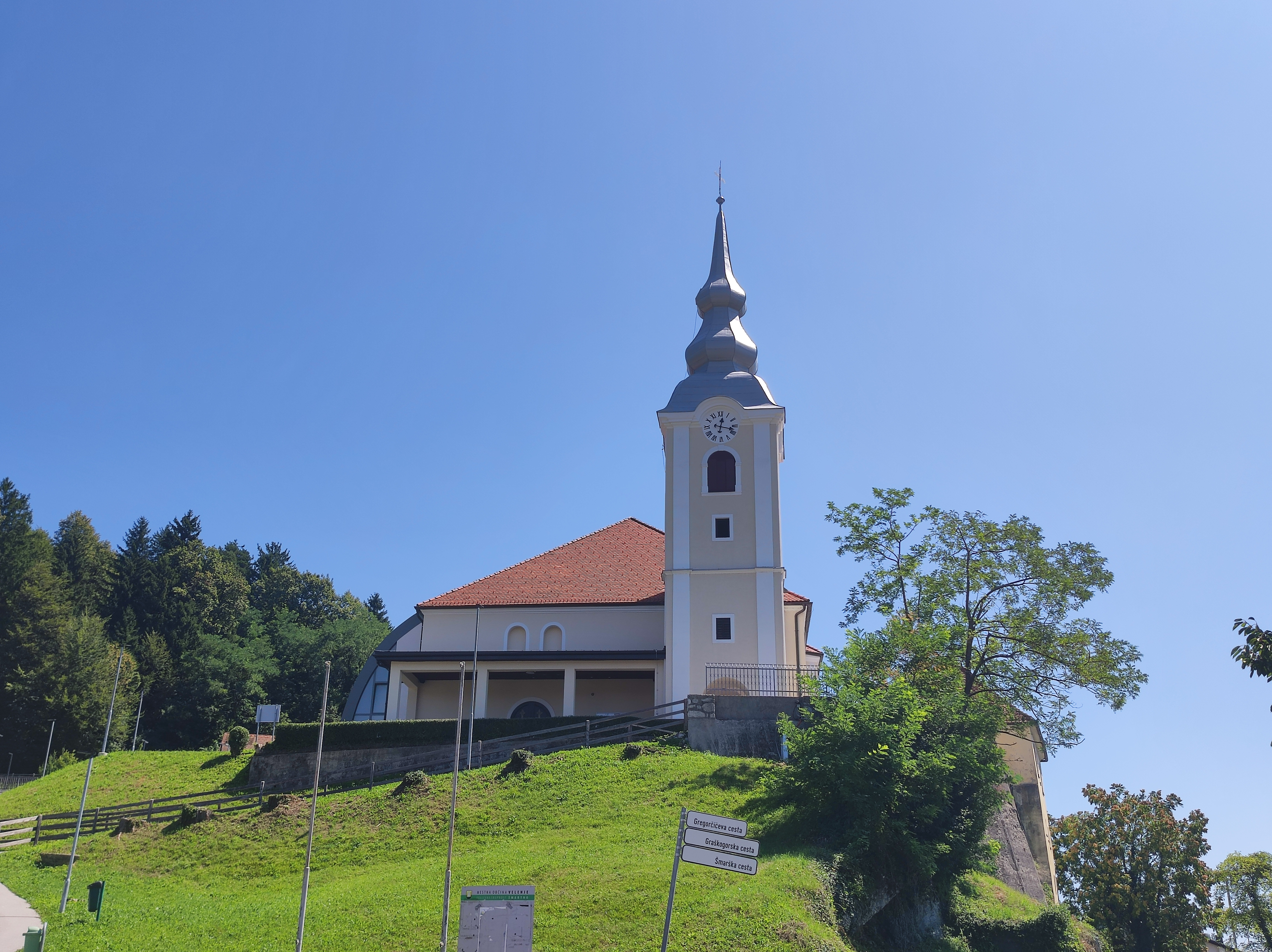
St. Martin's parish church

== International relations ==
=== Twin towns and sister cities ===
Velenje is twinned with:

- Esslingen am Neckar, Germany
- Neath Port Talbot, Wales
- Split, Croatia
- Pljevlja, Montenegro
- Udine, Italy
