= Kunšperk =

- Location in Slovenia
- Coordinates: 46°3′26″N 15°41′37″E
- Country: Slovenia
- Traditional region: Styria
- Statistical region: Lower Sava
- Municipality: Bistrica ob Sotli

Area
  - Total: 4.06 km^{2} (1.57 sq mi)
- Elevation: 351 m (1,152 ft)

Population (2020)
  - Total: 102
  - Density: 25.1/km^{2} (65.1/sq mi)

Kunšperk (pronounced [ˈkuːnʃpɛrk]; German: Königsberg) is a settlement on the right bank of the Sotla River in the Municipality of Bistrica ob Sotli in eastern Slovenia. The area is part of the traditional region of Styria. It is now included in the Lower Sava Statistical Region; until January 2014 it was part of the Savinja Statistical Region.

== Name ==
Kunšperk was first attested in written sources as Chuongisperch in 1167 (and as Chunigesperch in 1178 and Küngesberc in 1227). The name originally referred to the castle above the settlement. Until 1918, the settlement was officially known as Königsberg (literally, 'king's mountain') in German. The name was borrowed from Bavarian Middle High German into Slovene as *Kun(i)gšperk and then simplified to Kunšperk.

== History ==
Kunšperk developed as a typical market town below Kunšperk Castle. It was managed by the lords of Kunšperk until 1395. A defensive tower had been built in the town by 1368. Kunšperk was mentioned as having the right to a weekly fair in the 16th century. The architecture of the town today shows Classicist and Biedermeier features, as well as the work of local 18th- and 19th-century stone cutters.

== Churches ==
A church dedicated to Saint James stood in the town by 1490. Saint James' Church was abandoned under the rule of Joseph II and demolished, and a blacksmith's workshop was built in its place.

The parish church, dedicated to Saint Peter, formerly stood outside the town in the hamlet of Leskovec. During the Ottoman wars in Europe the church was converted into a strong fortification, causing the market town to gravitate toward it.

A third church, dedicated to Saint Catherine, stood in the settlement above Orešje na Bizeljskem near Kunšperk Castle. It was first mentioned in 1545, but was in ruins by the end of the 18th century.

== Kunšperk Castle ==
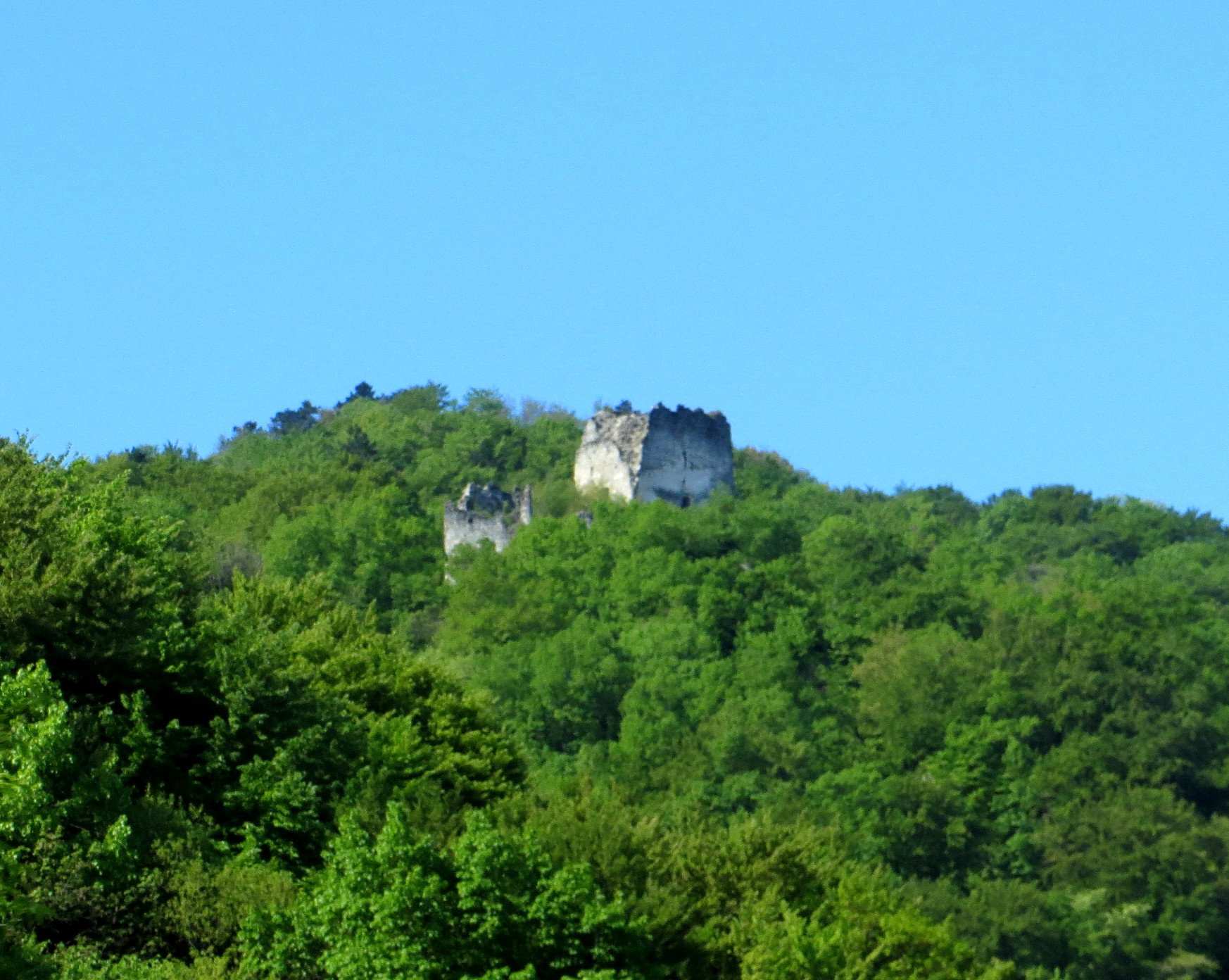
Ruins of Kunšperk Castle

The ruins of Kunšperk Castle (German: Königsberg) can still be seen on a steep hill south of the settlement. It was a Romanesque castle surrounded by defence walls built in the 12th century with later additions (a Gothic chapel and Renaissance fortifications). It was abandoned in the 17th century.
