= Baumkircher Tower =

Coordinates: 45°50′39.39″N 13°57′46.9″E

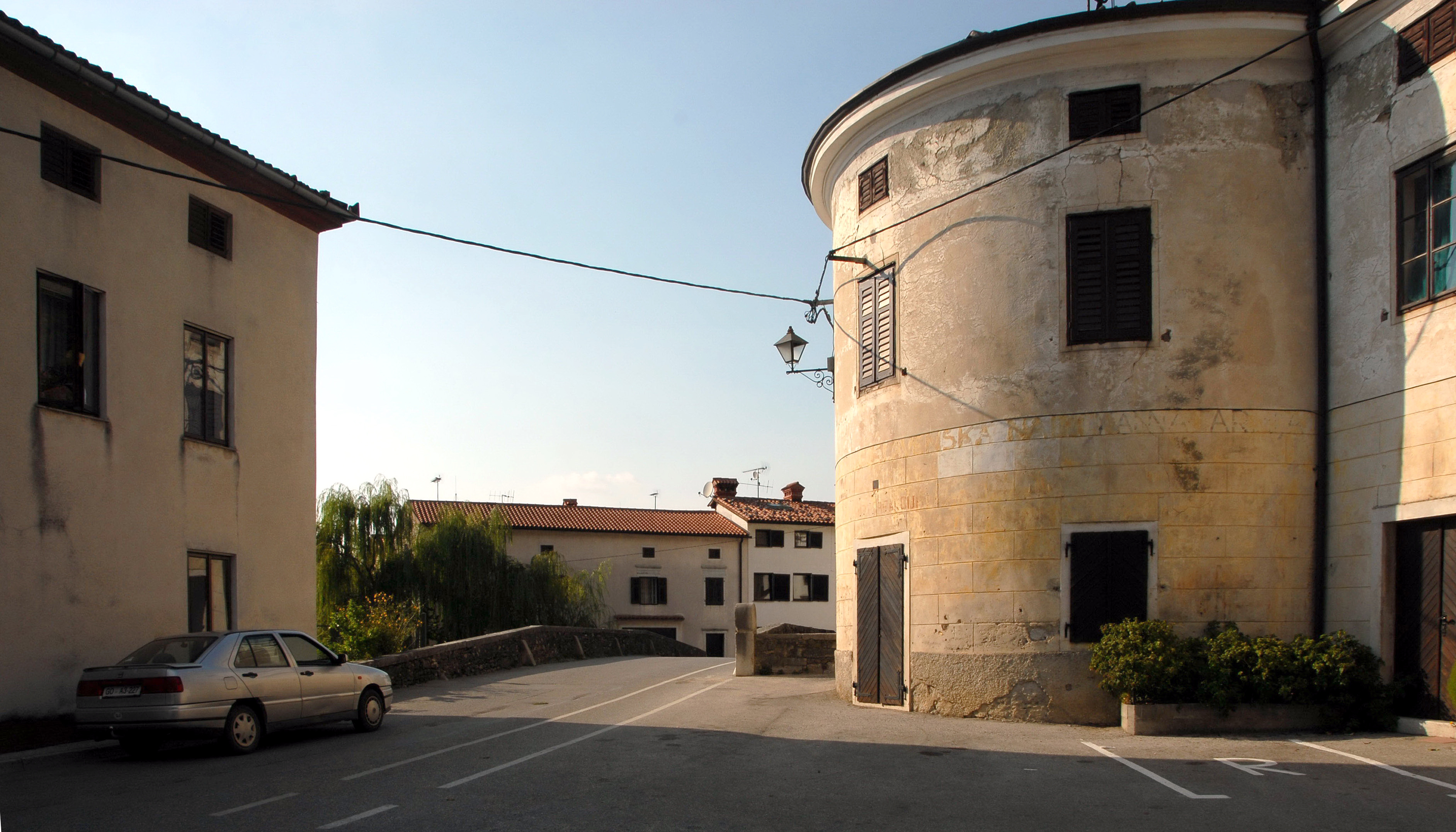
Baumkircher Tower (right)

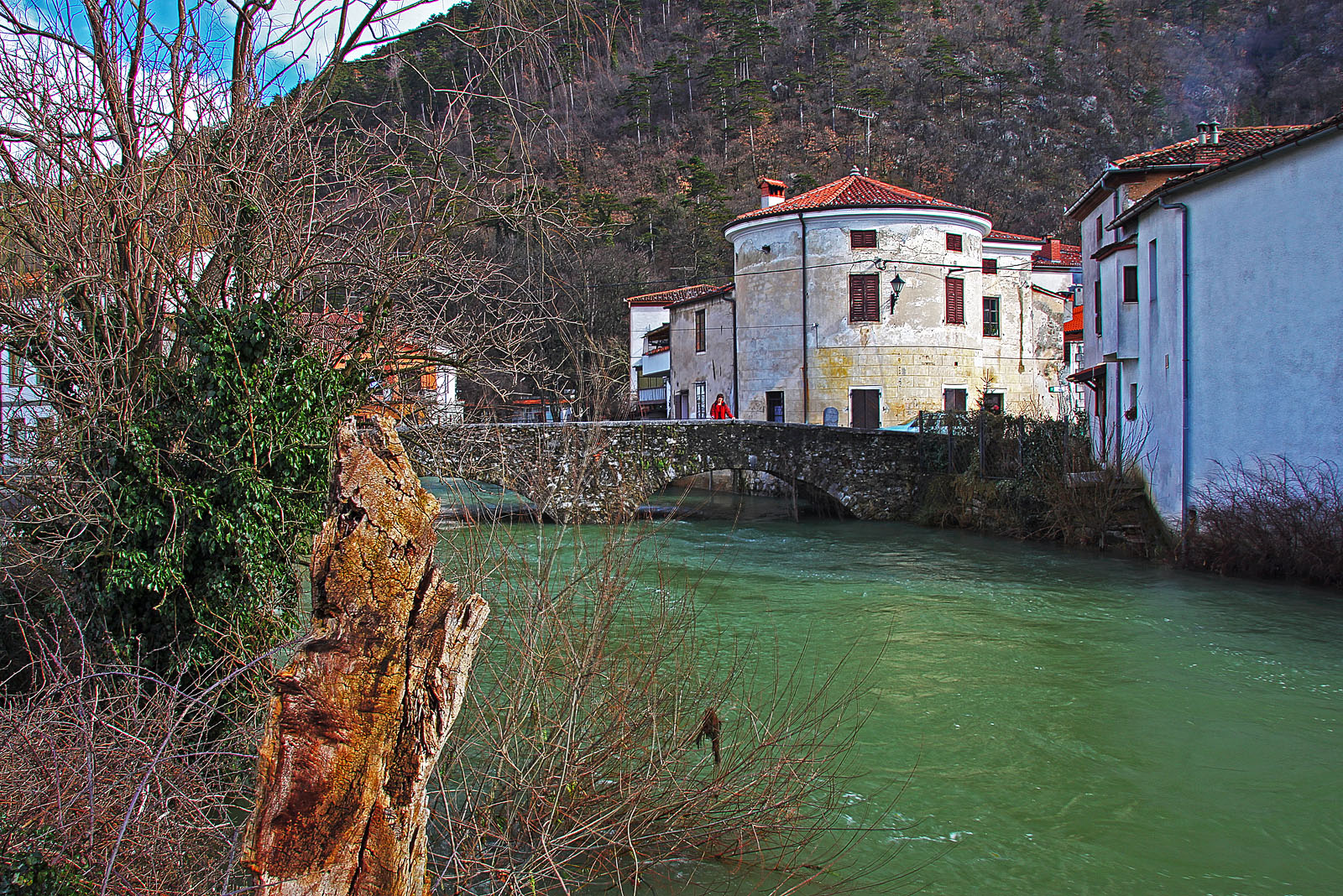
Tower and its bridge

The Baumkircher Tower (Slovene: Baumkircherjev Turn, from German: Baumkircher Turm), also known as Tabor Castle (Grad Tabor) or Lower Castle (Spodnji grad), is a defensive tower or small castle located in the town of Vipava in southwestern Slovenia.

== History ==
The tower was built by Herhlin Kranspergar in 1342, as a fortification guarding the adjacent stone bridge across the Vipava River. In 1386, the knight Haertl sold it to Hermann I of Celje After passing from their hands to the Patriarchate of Aquileia to the Habsburgs, it was given in fief to the knights Baumkircher, who lent it its current name. The family retained it until 1471, when then-owner Andreas Baumkircher instigated a revolt of the Styrian nobility against Holy Roman Emperor Frederick III, and was beheaded for treason in Graz. The castle then reverted to the duchy of Carniola, and was managed by its officers and leaseholders. The latter included Jurij Gallo, who between 1517 and 1521 subleased the tower to Carniolan vicedom (bishop's deputy in secular affairs) Erasmus Braunwart.

From either 1533 or 1624 (sources vary) to the end of World War I, the castle was a possession of the Lanthieri family.

The preserved elements of the structure include a part of the old main building, the defensive tower, and a partial wall with a gateway and a stone relief of the Lanthieri arms, dated 1653, set above the portal.

== Sources ==
- Castles, Mansions and Manors in Slovenia (Didakta, January 1995, ISBN 86-7707-084-2) by Ivan Jakič (Gradovi, dvorci in graščine na Slovenskem), (in Slovene)
- vlaki.net Photos of the castle at Vlaki.net (in Slovene)
