= Kalec Castle =

Castle in Slovenia

Coordinates: 45°38′29.53″N 14°14′44.5″E

- Slovenia
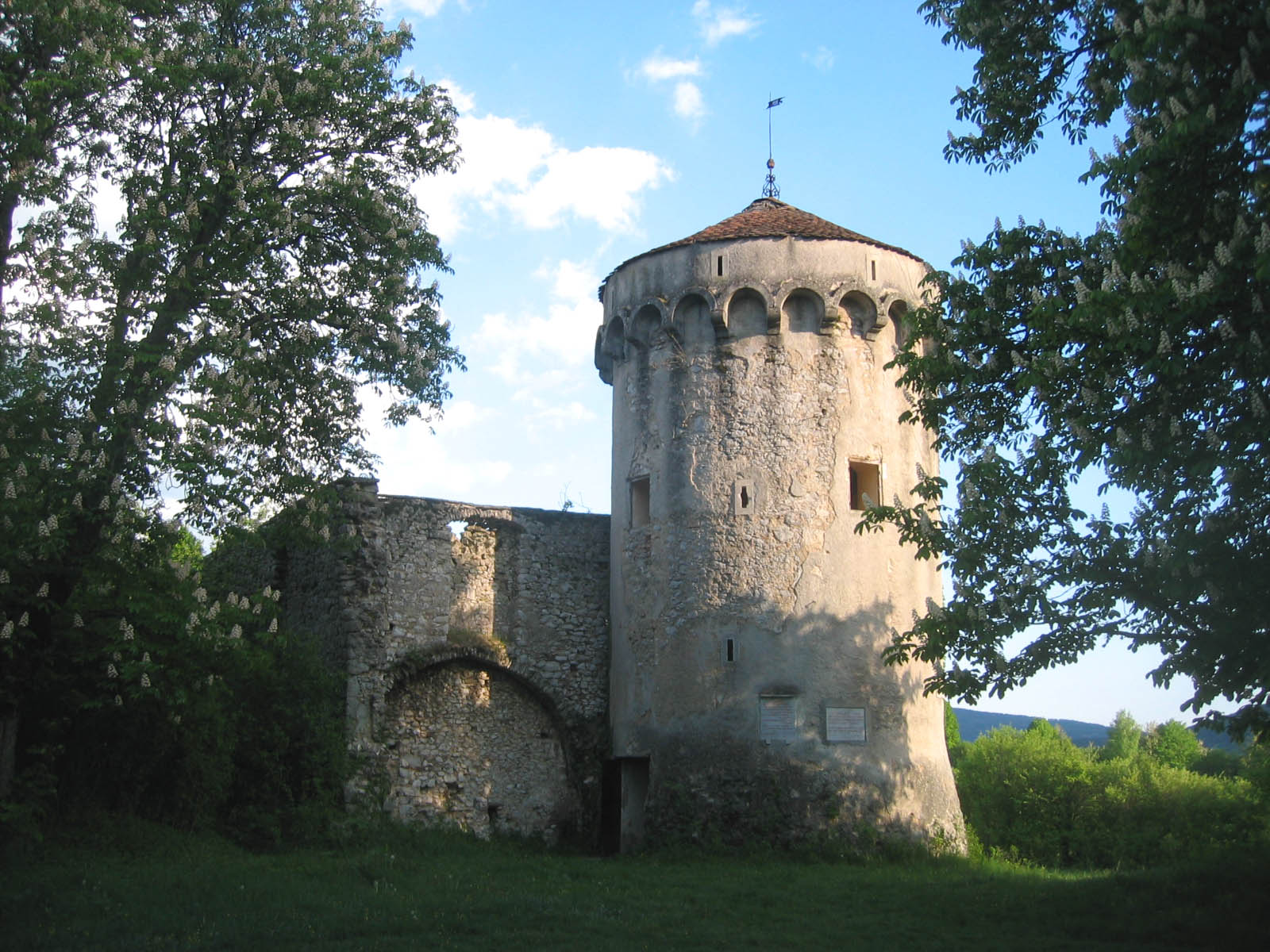
- Kalec Castle

Site history
- Materials: Limestone

Kalec Castle (Slovene: Grad Kalec, originally Kalc or Kauc; German: Steinberg or Stemberg) is a partially ruined castle in Bač in Slovenia.

The castle, of which only a single tower and some sections of wall survive intact, stands on a slope known as Breg, near the source of the Pivka River, at an elevation of 618 m.

Illustrated in Valvasor's 1689 Glory of the Duchy of Carniola, it was built in the mid-17th century by the noble house of Steinberg. Its later owners included the Auersperg family and the Slovene composer Miroslav Vilhar, who also died in it. The castle was abandoned by its last residents after World War I, and began falling apart.

In 1941 it hosted a meeting of the antifascist militant group TIGR.

Today the Krpan Hiking Trail passes beside the ruins, which are surrounded by a copse of old linden trees. The path to the castle is bordered by a row of chestnut trees.
