= Račji Dvor Mansion =

17th-century mansion in Maribor, Slovenia

Coordinates: 46°34′19.01″N 15°37′44.23″E

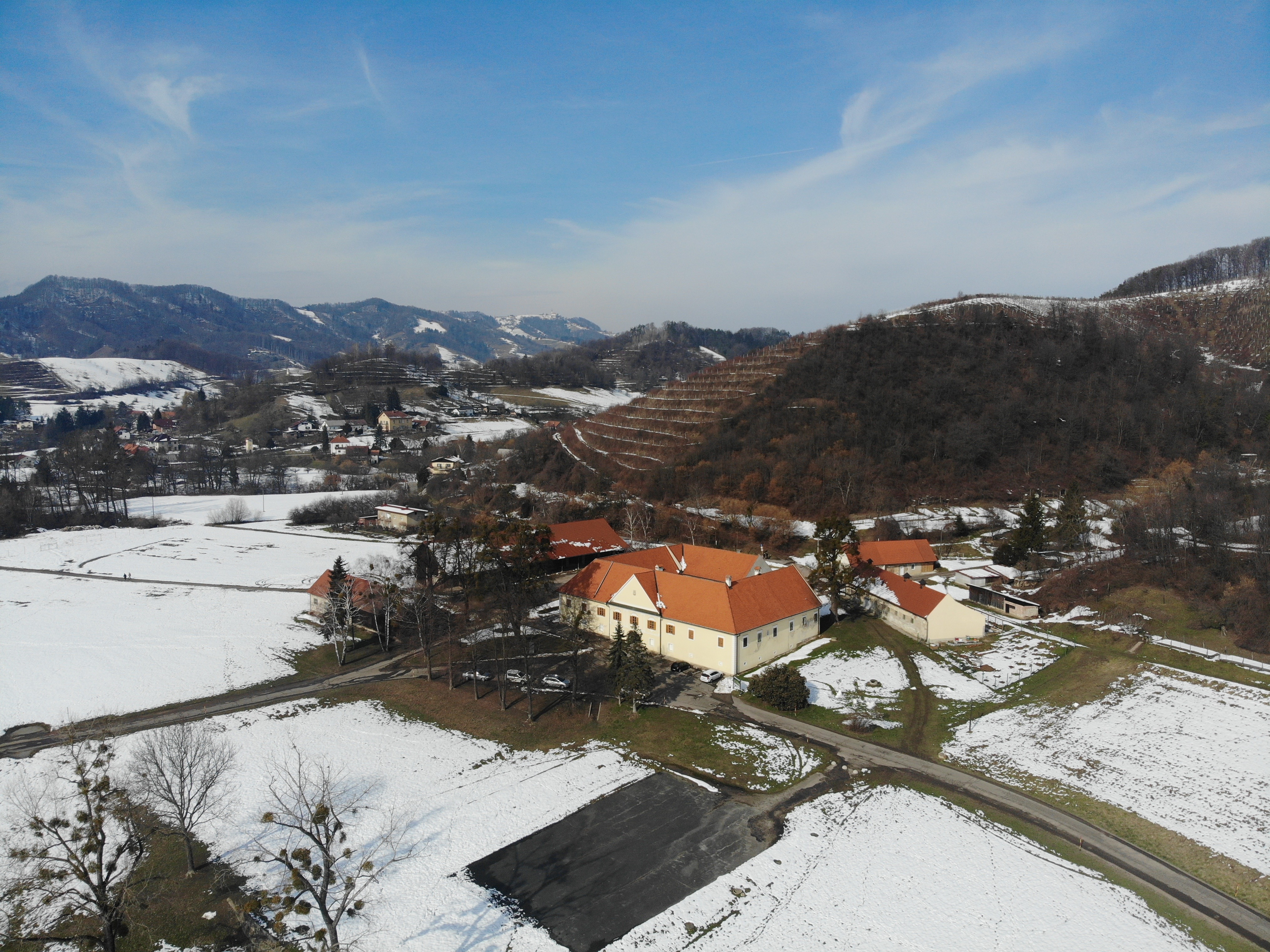
Račji dvor

Račji Dvor Mansion (Slovene: dvorec Račji dvor, literally "Ducks' Court Mansion") is a 17th-century mansion standing on a plain at the western edge of the town of Maribor, Slovenia, at the address of Raški dol 1. It has been protected as a cultural monument of national significance.

== Architecture ==
The mansion complex consists of four two-story non-connected buildings enclosing a central courtyard. The pediment of the facade of the main building bears the arms of the Admonts and the date "1778." The facades of the lesser buildings are more modest. The inner courtyard was once faced with arched arcades, since walled over.

== History ==
The mansion was first mentioned in 1284. It was rebuilt in 1414–16, and extensively altered during the 17th and 18th centuries. The east building is the oldest, dating from the 17th century. The 1733–34 rebuilding saw the southern (now main) wing enlarged. Between 1776 and 1778 the western (housekeeping) wing was added, the facades altered to their current form and the inner arcades filled in. The Northern wing was added in 1864.

== Open-air museum ==
An open-air museum lies on a plain directly adjacent to the mansion and below a series of hills covered with abandoned vineyards. The museum's central building is surrounded by examples of typical architecture from the neighboring areas of Drava Plain, Haloze, Slovene Hills, Pohorje and Kozjak. The complex is surrounded by heirloom orchards, gardens, pastures and fields.
