= Ajman Castle =

Coordinates: 46°11′17.62″N 14°19′38.72″E

- Ajmanov Grad
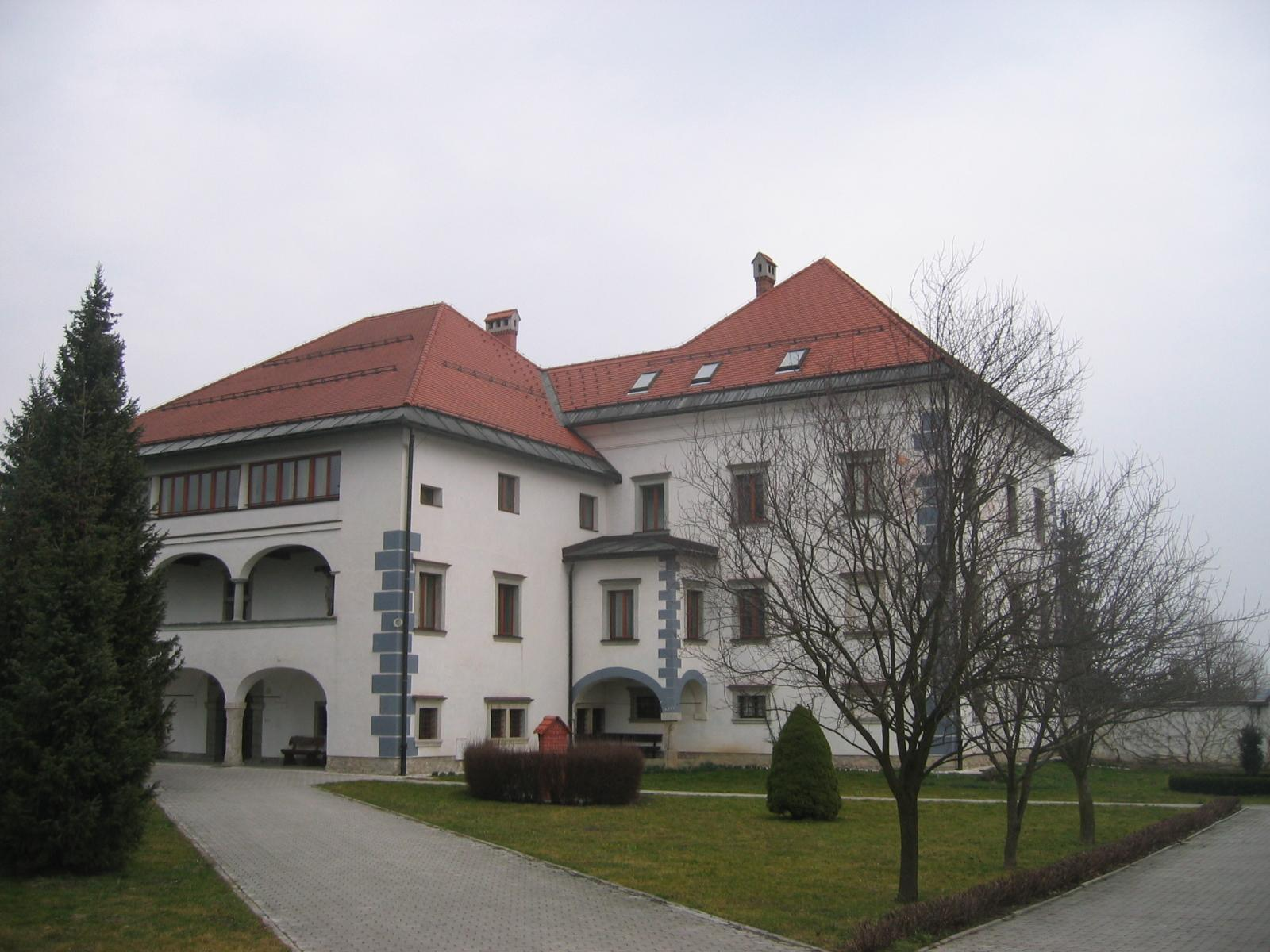
- Ajman Castle, Sveti Duh

General information
- Address: Sv. Duh 244, 4220
- Town or city: Sveti Duh
- Country: Slovenia
- Year(s) built: 1679 (initial construction); 1733 (expansion); c. 1970 (renovation)
- Destroyed: 30 April 1944

Ajman Castle (Slovene: Ajmanov grad, German: Schloss Ehrenau 'Ehrenau Castle') is a 17th-century manor located near the settlement of Sveti Duh in the Municipality of Škofja Loka, Slovenia.

The late-renaissance castle was built (as Ehrenau Castle) in 1679 by the governor of the Škofja Loka lordship, Franc Matija the noble Lampfrizhaimb. Successive owners included the noble families of Angerburg, Widmannsstätten, Dietrich, Zanetti, Flachenfeld, and Dienzl.

The manorial chapel of the Holy Virgin was built in 1733 and contains an altar-wall mural by Franc Jelovšek, one of the more prominent Slovene painters of the eighteenth century. Commissioned between 1739 and 1746 by its owner Kristof Laurenz von Flachenfeld, the painting features the Virgin flanked by St. John Nepomuk and St. Francis Xavier.

In 1746 the manor was sold to Adam Dinzl Angerburg. In the late 18th century it obtained its current name, Ajman Castle, after another owner named Heimann. In 1918 it passed into the hands of Marija Guzelj (née Detela), and then to the Demšar family, which held it until World War II. On 30 April 1944 the Partisans burned the manor down. It was thoroughly renovated some decades later. Today it houses an Ursuline monastery.
