= Orešje na Bizeljskem =

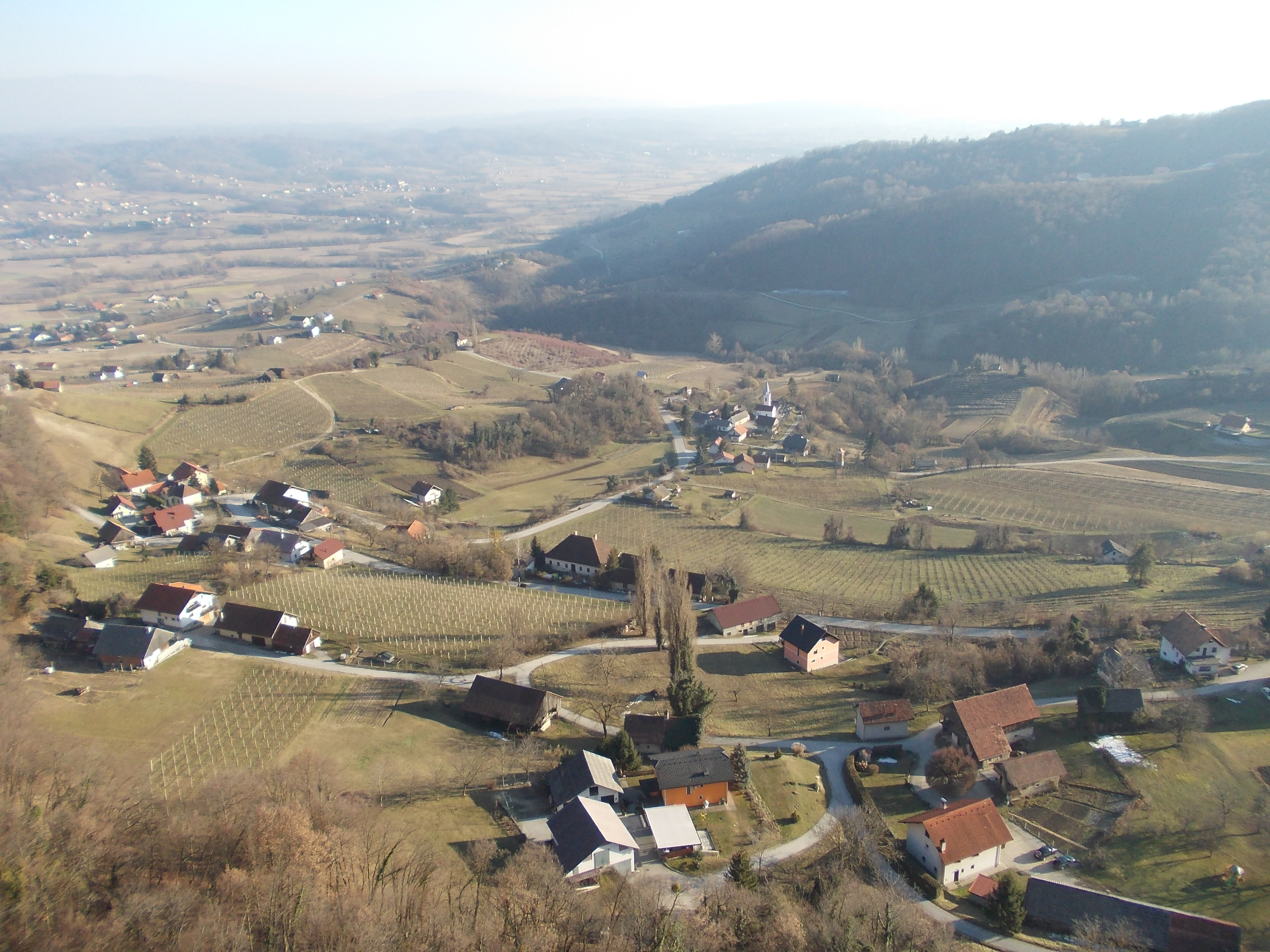

- Location in Slovenia
- Coordinates: 46°2′56.37″N 15°42′27.88″E
- Country: Slovenia
- Traditional region: Styria
- Statistical region: Lower Sava
- Municipality: Brežice

Area
  - Total: 2.86 km^{2} (1.10 sq mi)
- Elevation: 299 m (981 ft)

Population (2020)
  - Total: 207
  - Density: 72.4/km^{2} (187/sq mi)

Orešje na Bizeljskem (pronounced [ɔˈɾeːʃjɛ na biˈzeːlskɛm]; German: Nussdorf) is a settlement northeast of Bizeljsko in the Municipality of Brežice in eastern Slovenia, right on the border with Croatia. A minor border crossing connects the settlement to the town of Klanjec on the Croatian side. The area is part of the traditional region of Styria. It is now included in the Lower Sava Statistical Region. The settlement includes the hamlets of Rupe, Kozja Peč, Sveta Marjeta, Kupce, Gabrk (German: Gaisberg), Bohor, Graben, Hrašina (also known locally as Trojno mesto), and Šefce (also known locally as Ledine).

== Name ==
The name of the settlement was changed from Orešje to Orešje na Bizeljskem in 1953. In the past the German name was Nussdorf.

== Church ==
The local church is dedicated to Mary Magdalene and belongs to the Parish of Bizeljsko. It is a single-naved building first mentioned in written documents dating to 1545. Its polygonal sanctuary and belfry were added in the 1653. In 1842 the nave was extended and vaulted.
