= Sveti Duh, Škofja Loka =

Sveti Duh
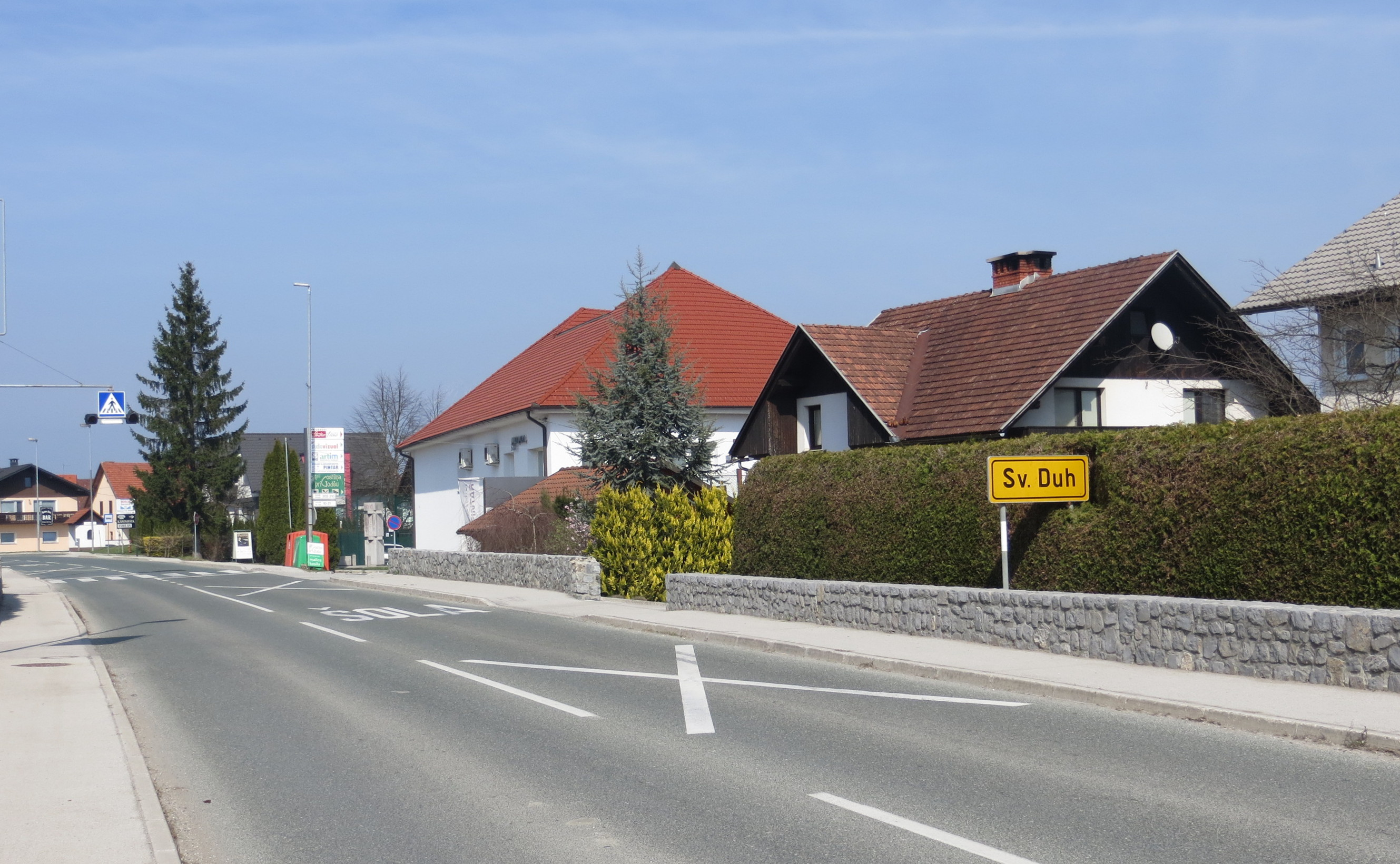

- Location in Slovenia
- Coordinates: 46°11′20.21″N 14°19′32.04″E
- Country: Slovenia
- Traditional region: Upper Carniola
- Statistical region: Upper Carniola
- Municipality: Škofja Loka

Area
  - Total: 3.13 km^{2} (1.21 sq mi)
- Elevation: 368.8 m (1,210 ft)

Population (2002)
  - Total: 930

Sveti Duh (pronounced [ˈsʋeːti ˈduːx]; German: Heiligengeist) is a village in the Municipality of Škofja Loka in the Upper Carniola region of Slovenia.

== Church ==
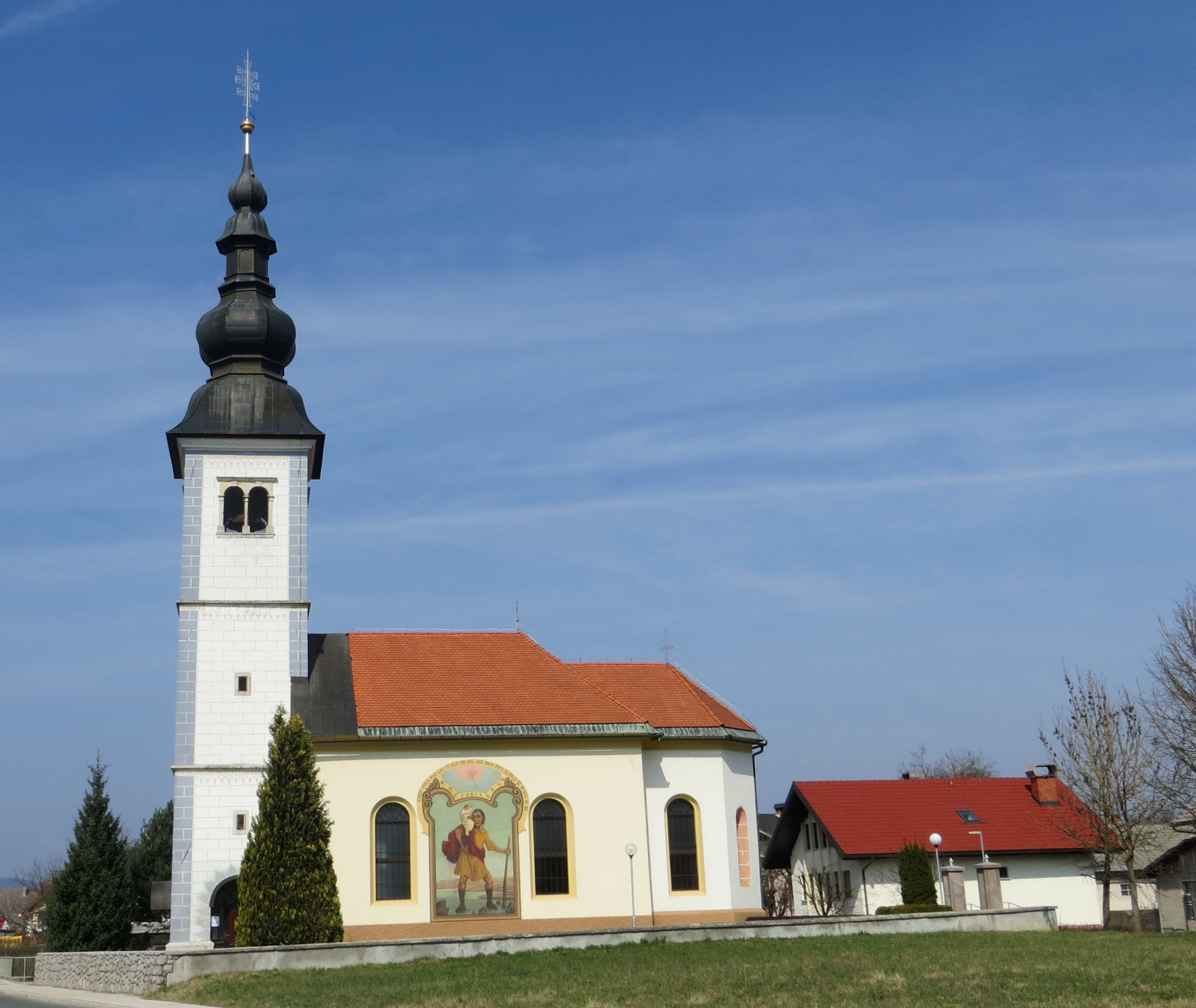
Holy Spirit Church

The church in the centre of the village is dedicated to the Holy Spirit. It is Gothic in its origins with the original sanctuary surviving, but was largely rebuilt in 1856. Some 15th-century frescos survive in the sanctuary and the belfry is from the 17th century. The high altar is from 1667, but was extensively renovated and repainted in 1860, when the two side altars were also made.
