= Jakobski Dol Castle =

17th century Slovenian castle

Coordinates: 46°37′40.24″N 15°44′5.63″E

Jakobski Dol Castle (Slovene: Grad Jakobski Dol, German: Schloss Laas) is a 17th-century castle located in the settlement of Spodnji Jakobski Dol, part of the municipality of Pesnica in northeastern Slovenia.

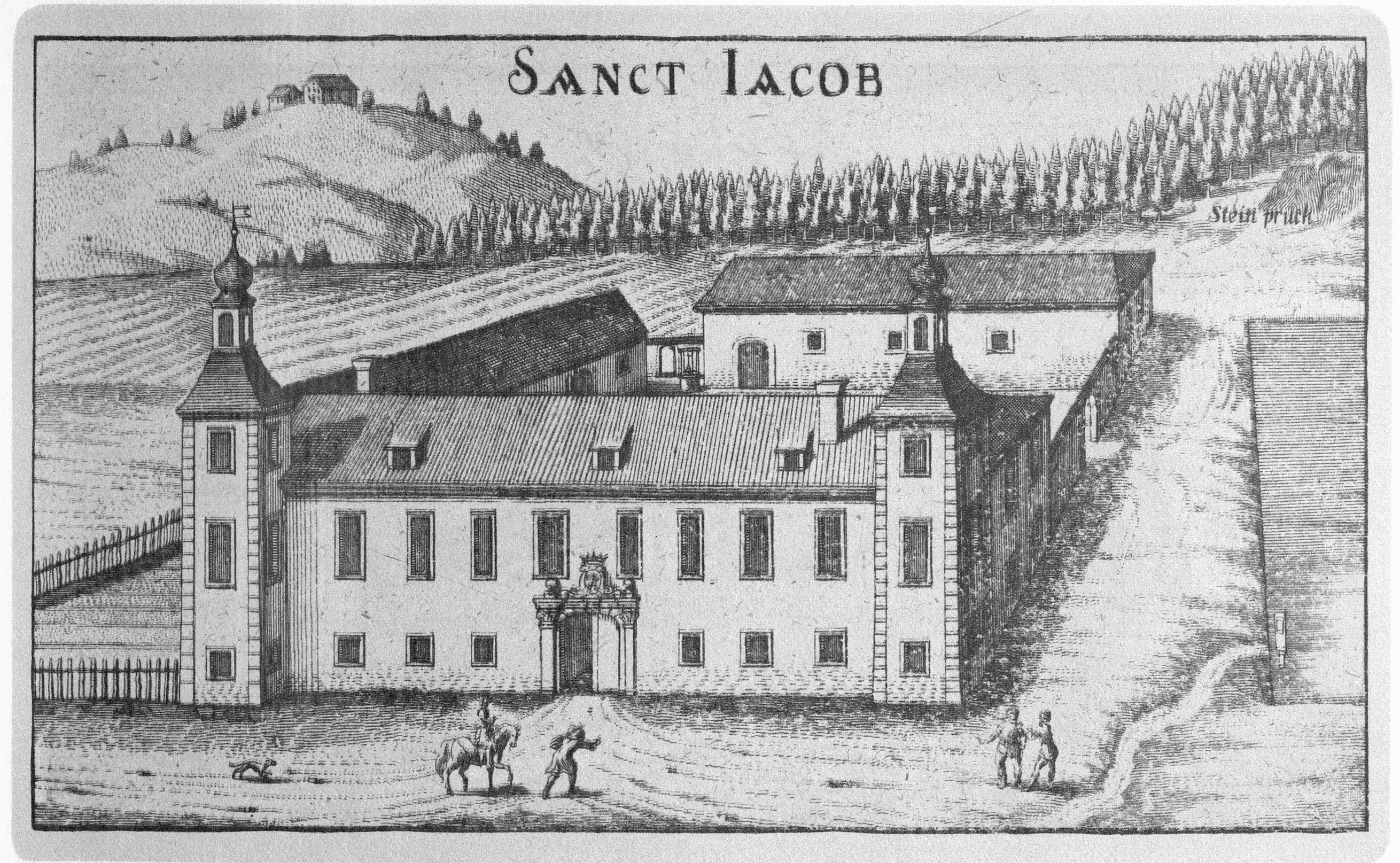
Illustration of Jakobski Dol by Georg Matthäus Vischer, 1681

== History ==
Sources mention a precursor of the present castle on the same site in the 15th and 16th centuries. The current structure was built in 1678 by the wife of Graz lawyer, provincial secretary and official dr. Gottfried von Beckham-Widmannstetter. After his death, the manor was inherited by his son, who died in battle soon after. The estate was then held by the Beckh family until 1768, when it was bought first by Kajetan Langenmanntel and then in 1779 by Count Kajetan Auersperg, the richest family in Carniolia. In 1784 it was purchased by Franz von Weisseneg, then by Anna the noble Edersheim, and in 1810 by Voss Ignatius, who in 1819 sold it to his son Jacob. In 1892 it was bought family Dolajš.
