= Ortnek Castle =

Coordinates: 45°46′57.76″N 14°40′13.71″E

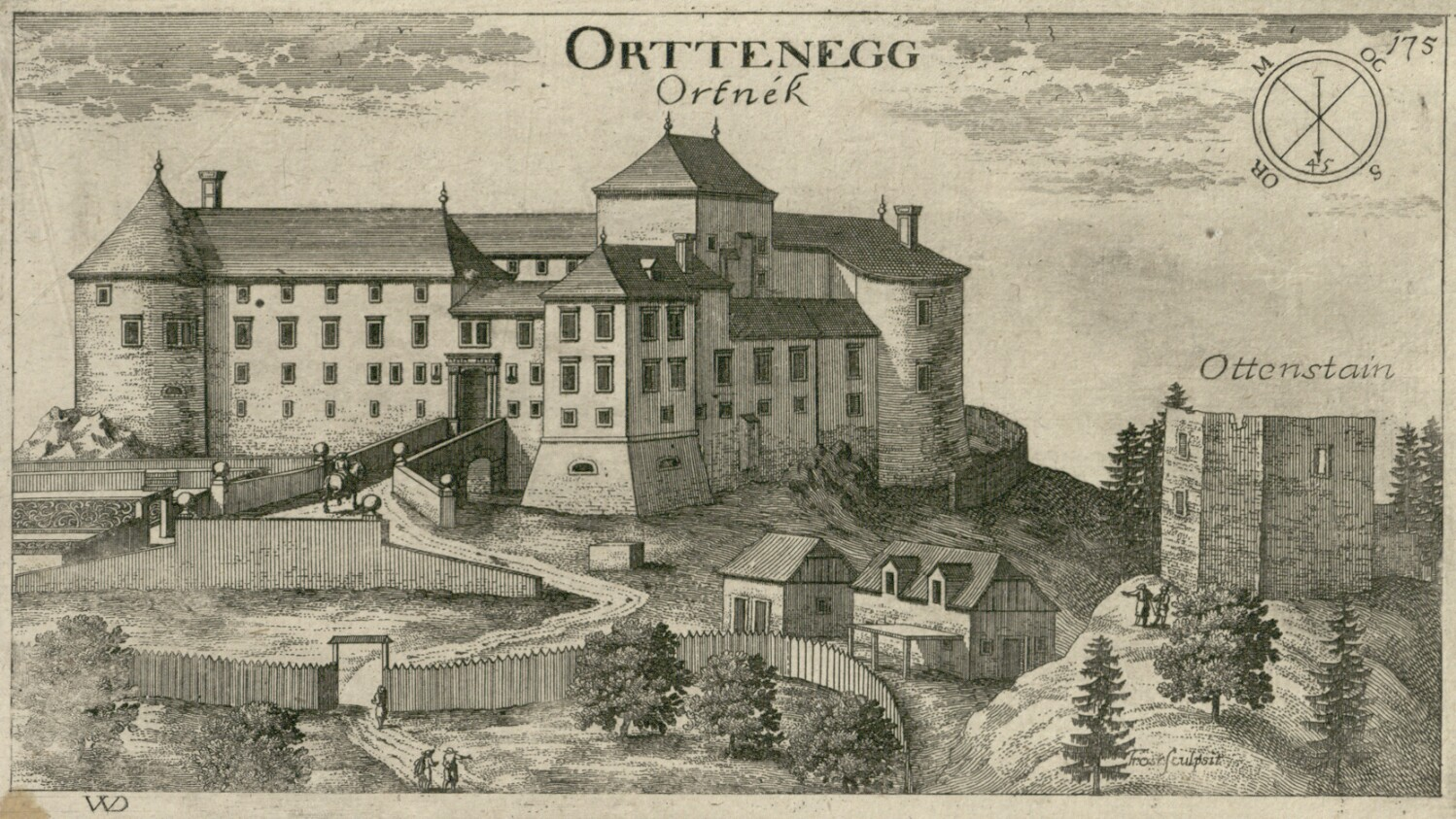
Ortnek Castle in a 1679 engraving by Valvasor

Ortnek Castle (Slovene: Ortneški grad; also known as the Old Castle (Stari grad)) is a 12th-century castle ruin in the vicinity of the town of Ribnica, Slovenia. The ruin stands on Big Žrnovec Hill (Veliki Žrnovec), near the village of Hudi Konec.

== History ==
In 1161, Count Otto II of Ortenburg erected a small fort at the site. By the early 15th century the castle was inherited by the Counts of Celje; in the late 15th century it passed from the Habsburgs to the house of Lamberg. Peasant revolts and Ottoman raids damaged the castle, necessitating a thorough Renaissance rebuilding. Sold off in the late 16th century, it lost most of its importance. Another remodeling followed in the 17th century, by the Counts of Moscon; the castle chapel of St. George dates from this phase. Its final owners were the Kosler family; The castle was acquired in 1823 by Johann Kosler Sr. (1780–1864), the father of Peter Kosler. Johann Kosler Jr. (1819–1898) and his family moved from the castle to the more convenient Lower Ortnek Castle on the road from Ljubljana to Kočevje in 1884. The last owner of the castle was Oskar Kosler (1898–1959), who lost the property when it was nationalized by Slovenia's postwar communist government in 1946.

== Current state ==
Several furnishings from the chapel of St. George, including three carved altars, paintings by Hans Georg Geigerfelder, and a pulpit dated 1641, were removed from the site for safekeeping. The chapel's icon of St. George can be seen in the National Gallery in Ljubljana.
