= Ig Castle =

Castle in Slovenia

Coordinates: 45°57′30.24″N 14°31′11.07″E

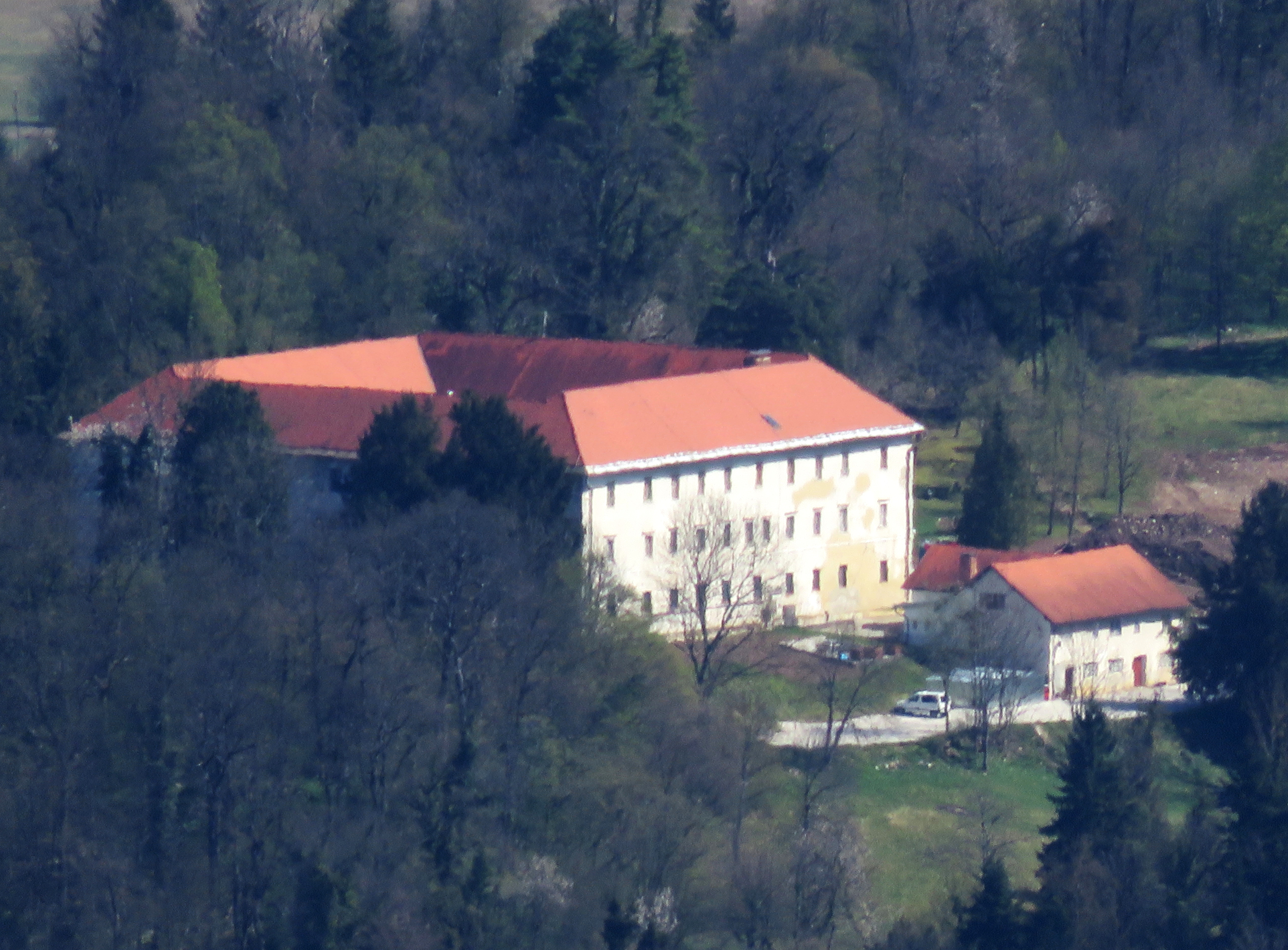
Ig Castle

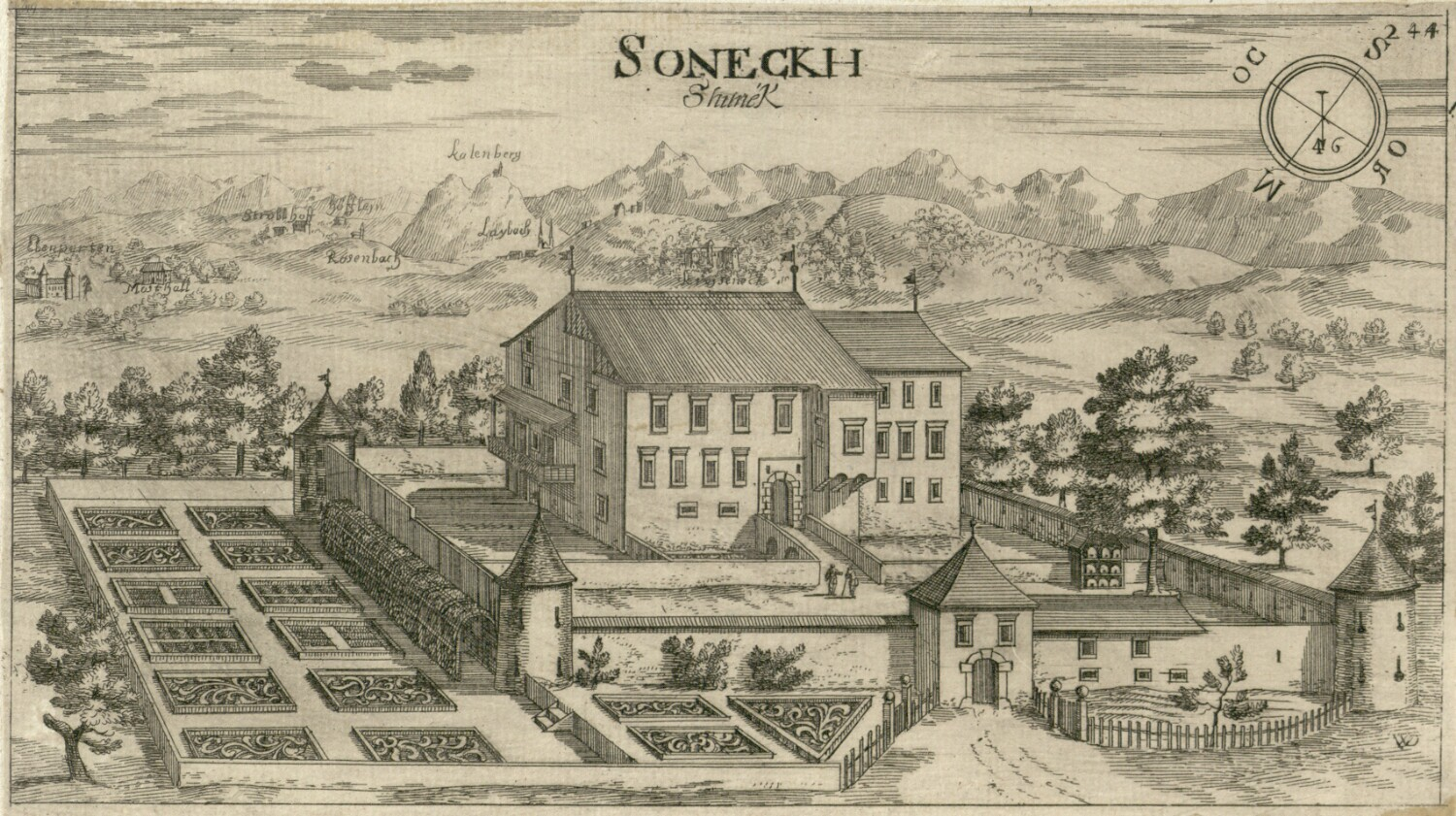
Ig Castle as depicted in 1679 by Johann Weikhard von Valvasor

Ig Castle (Slovene: Grad Ig or Ižanski grad, also known as Grad Iški Turn, Turnek), also Sonnegg Castle (German: Schloß Sonnegg) or Zonek Castle (Slovene: grad Zonek), stands on Pungart Hill (elevation 366 meters or 1,201 feet) above the settlement of Ig, on the southern outskirts of Ljubljana, the capital of Slovenia.

== History ==
The castle was first mentioned as hof Ig in 1369, when the noble house of Schnitzenbaum rebuilt an old estate building called Iški turn or Turnek as a defensive tower. In the late 15th century it was again rebuilt into a small manor and in 1510 sold to the house of Auersperg, which in 1581 sold it to the nobleman Johann Engelshauser. In 1717, Pope Clement XI authorized the opening of a private oratory at the castle. In 1805, the castle was inherited by a relative of the counts Engelshauser, Count Wilhelm Weikhard Auersperg.

The castle was the target of peasant revolts in 1515 and 1848, and was besieged by the Turks in 1528. During World War II, it served as an outpost for Italian carabinieri and Slovene Village Guard forces. In 1944, it was attacked and burned down by Partisans. After the war, it was repaired and converted into a women's prison. It is not currently open to the public.
