= Nemška vas =

Nemška Vas may refer to several places in Slovenia:

- Nemška Vas, Krško, a village in the Municipality of Krško
- Nemška Vas, Ribnica, a village in the Municipality of Ribnica
- Nemška Vas na Blokah, a village in the Municipality of Bloke
- Slovenska Vas, Pivka, a village in the Municipality of Pivka (known as Nemška Vas until 1955)
