= Štorovo =

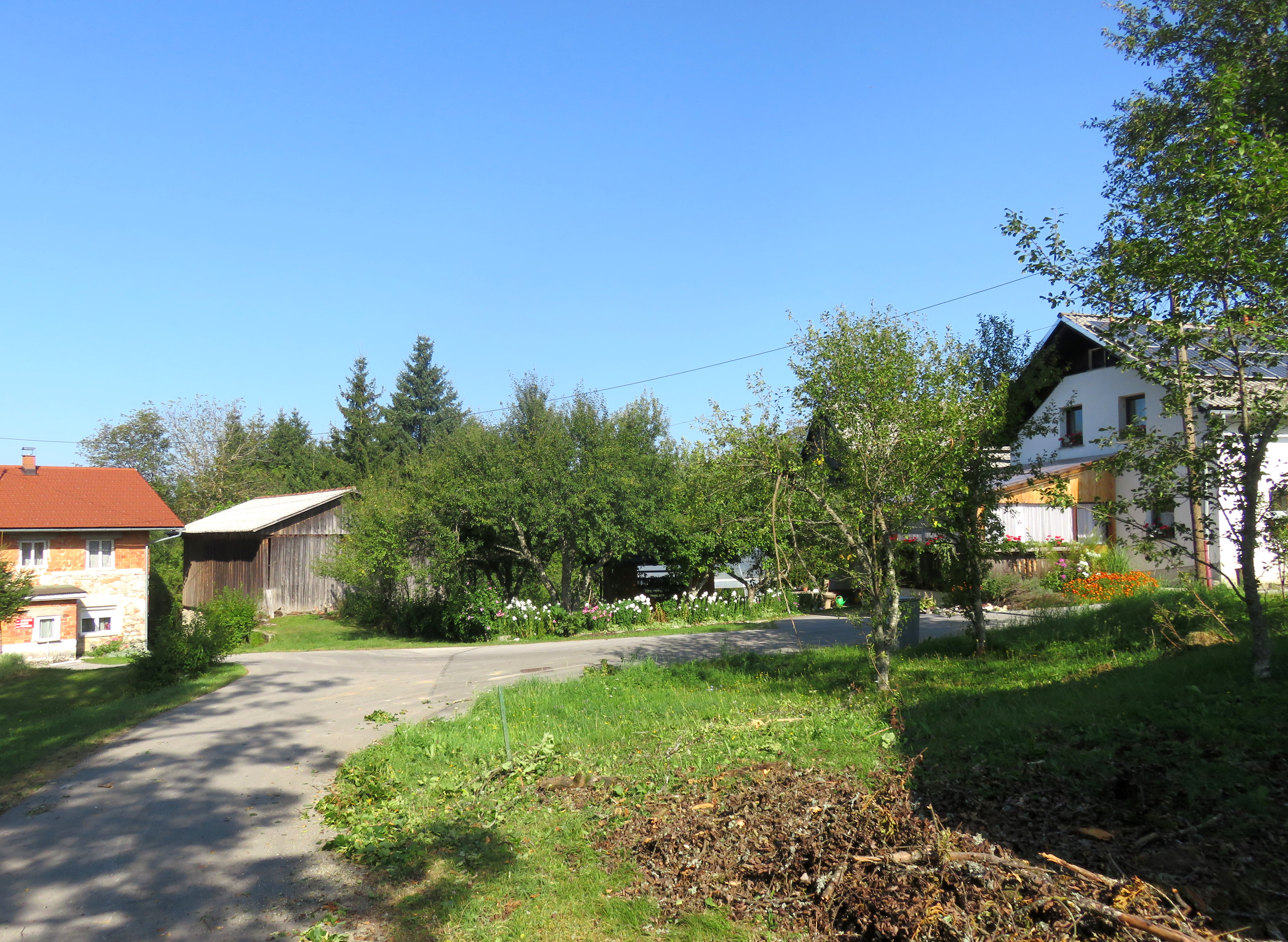

- Location in Slovenia
- Coordinates: 45°48′49.22″N 14°30′23.91″E
- Country: Slovenia
- Traditional region: Inner Carniola
- Statistical region: Littoral–Inner Carniola
- Municipality: Bloke

Area
  - Total: 1.39 km^{2} (0.54 sq mi)
- Elevation: 789.4 m (2,590 ft)

Population (2020)
  - Total: 4
  - Density: 2.9/km^{2} (7.5/sq mi)

Štorovo (pronounced [ˈʃtoːɾɔʋɔ]) is a small settlement north of the village of Ravnik in the Municipality of Bloke in the Inner Carniola region of Slovenia.
