= Gradiško =

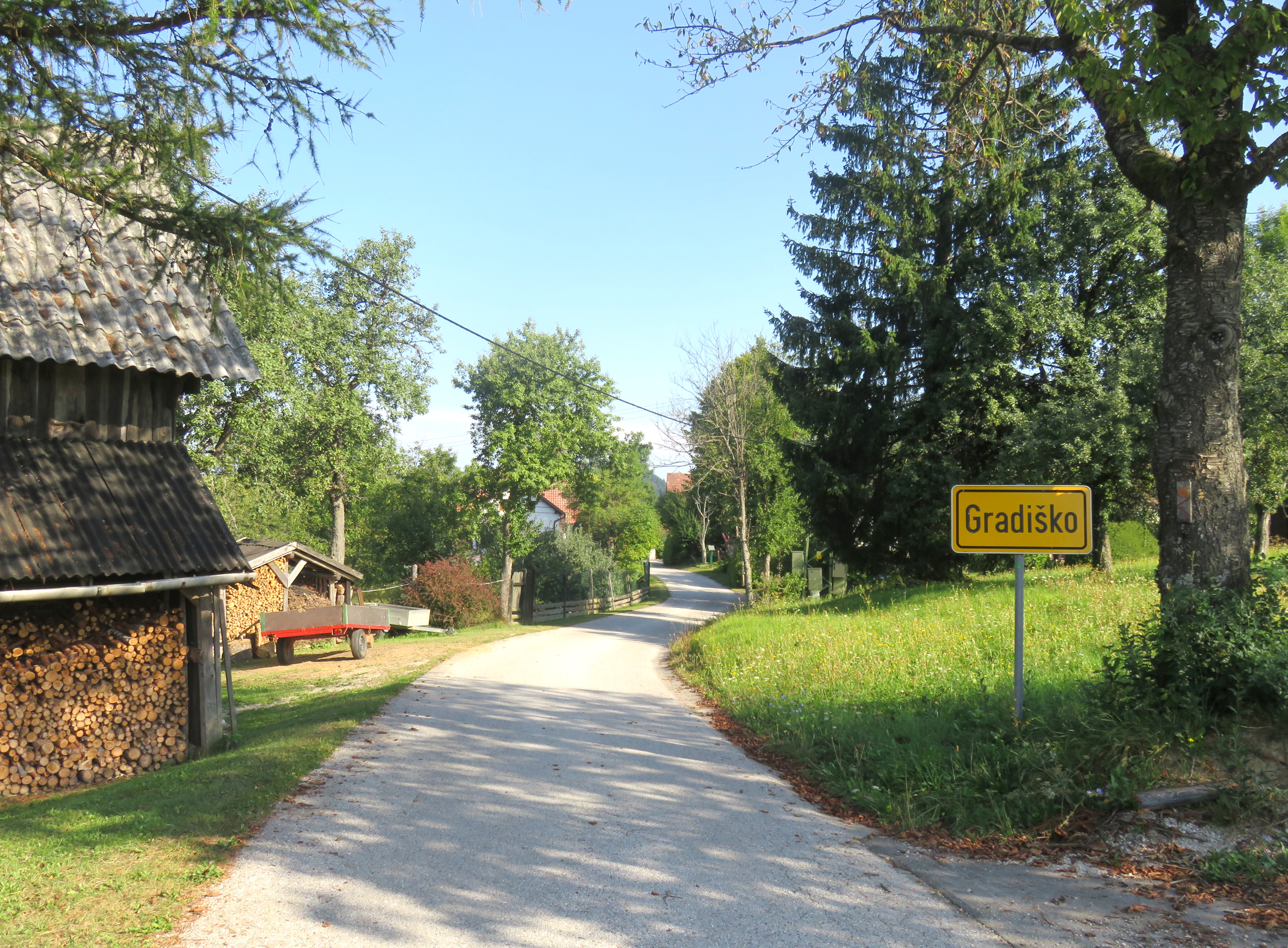

- Location in Slovenia
- Coordinates: 45°48′37.55″N 14°30′21.7″E
- Country: Slovenia
- Traditional region: Inner Carniola
- Statistical region: Littoral–Inner Carniola
- Municipality: Bloke

Area
  - Total: 0.50 km^{2} (0.19 sq mi)
- Elevation: 812.7 m (2,666 ft)

Population (2023)
  - Total: 14
  - Density: 28/km^{2} (73/sq mi)

Gradiško (pronounced [ɡɾaˈdiːʃkɔ], German: Gradischko) is small settlement in the Municipality of Bloke in the Inner Carniola region of Slovenia.
