= Ravne na Blokah =

- Location in Slovenia
- Coordinates: 45°45′10.95″N 14°33′15.65″E
- Country: Slovenia
- Traditional region: Inner Carniola
- Statistical region: Littoral–Inner Carniola
- Municipality: Bloke

Area
  - Total: 5.09 km^{2} (1.97 sq mi)
- Elevation: 753.5 m (2,472 ft)

Population (2020)
  - Total: 69
  - Density: 14/km^{2} (35/sq mi)

Ravne na Blokah (pronounced [ˈɾáːwnɛ na ˈblòːkax, - ˈblóː-]) is a village southeast of Nova Vas in the Municipality of Bloke in the Inner Carniola region of Slovenia.

== Name ==
The name of the settlement was changed from Ravne to Ravne na Blokah in 1953.

== Church ==
The local church in the settlement is dedicated to Saint Philip and Saint James and belongs to the Parish of Bloke.
