= Glina, Bloke =

Glina
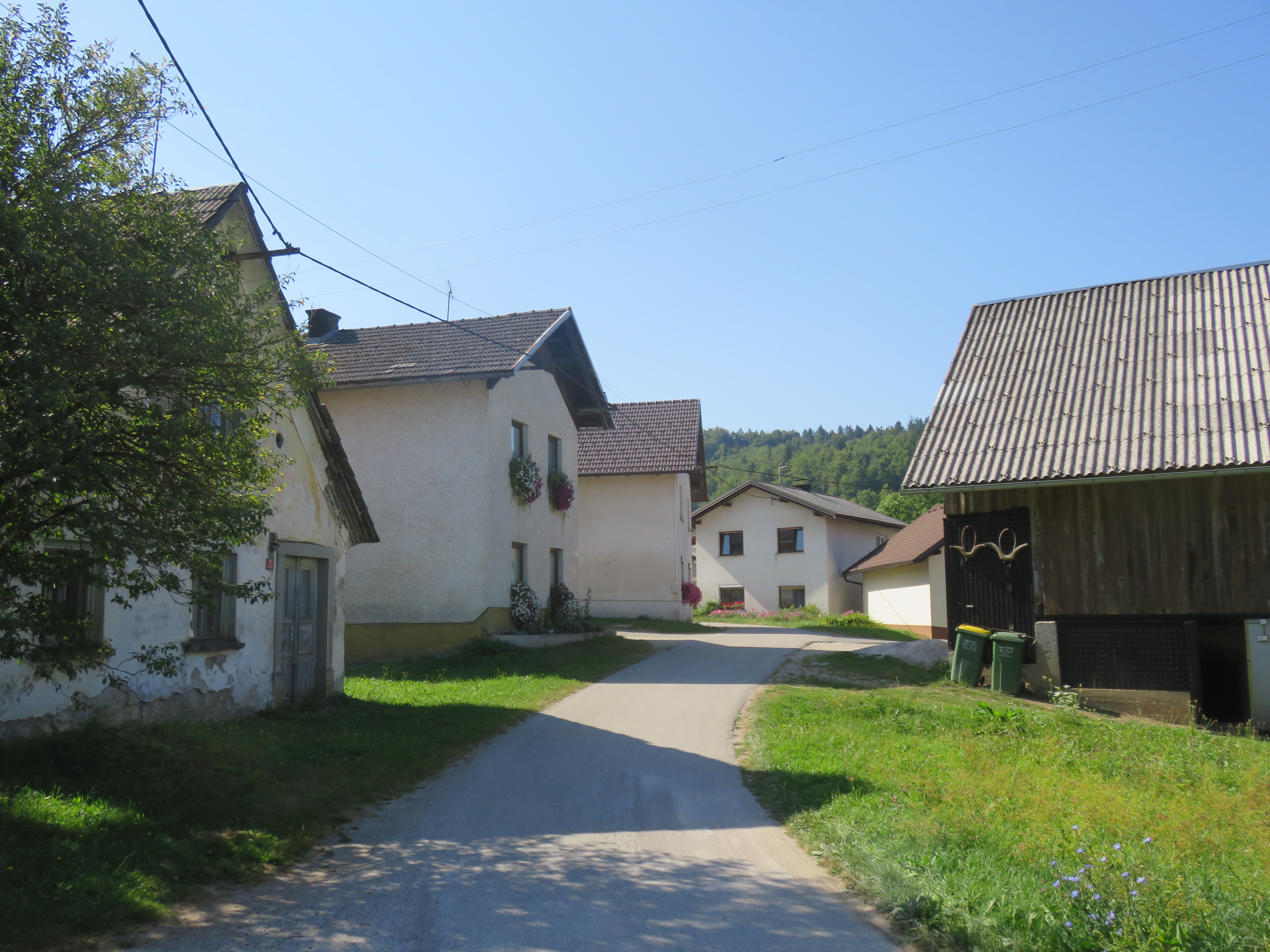

- Location in Slovenia
- Coordinates: 45°46′16.1″N 14°29′31.57″E
- Country: Slovenia
- Traditional region: Inner Carniola
- Statistical region: Littoral–Inner Carniola
- Municipality: Bloke

Area
  - Total: 1.03 km^{2} (0.40 sq mi)
- Elevation: 735.1 m (2,412 ft)

Population (2020)
  - Total: 40
  - Density: 39/km^{2} (100/sq mi)

Glina (pronounced [ˈɡliːna]) is small settlement just west of Nova Vas in the Municipality of Bloke in the Inner Carniola region of Slovenia.
