= Škrabče =

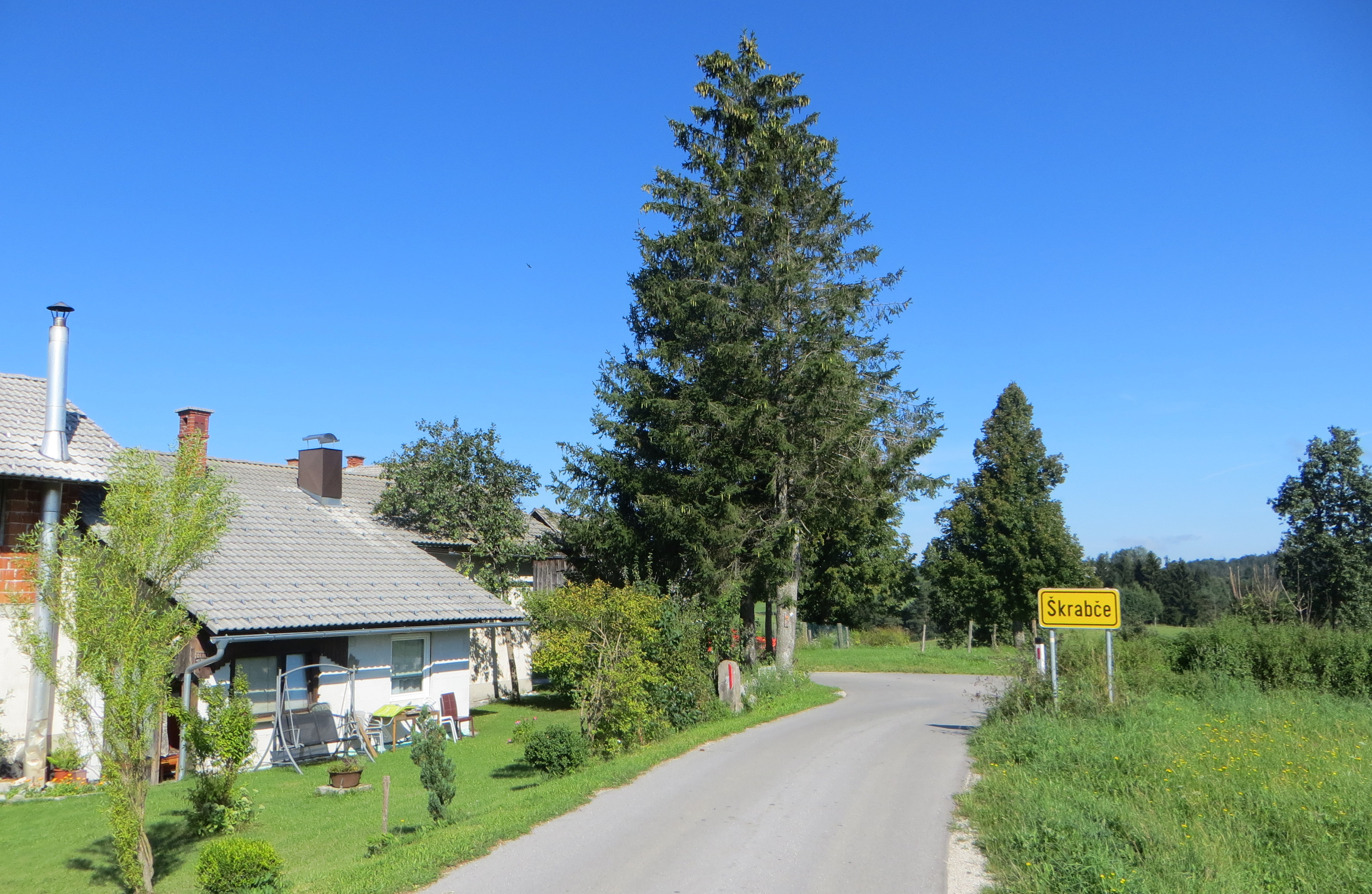

- Location in Slovenia
- Coordinates: 45°47′59.31″N 14°31′33.82″E
- Country: Slovenia
- Traditional region: Inner Carniola
- Statistical region: Littoral–Inner Carniola
- Municipality: Bloke

Area
  - Total: 1.7 km^{2} (0.66 sq mi)
- Elevation: 761.5 m (2,498 ft)

Population (2022)
  - Total: 16
  - Density: 9.4/km^{2} (24/sq mi)

Škrabče (pronounced [ˈʃkɾaːptʃɛ]) is a small dispersed settlement northeast of Nova Vas in the Municipality of Bloke in the Inner Carniola region of Slovenia.
