= Hudi Vrh =

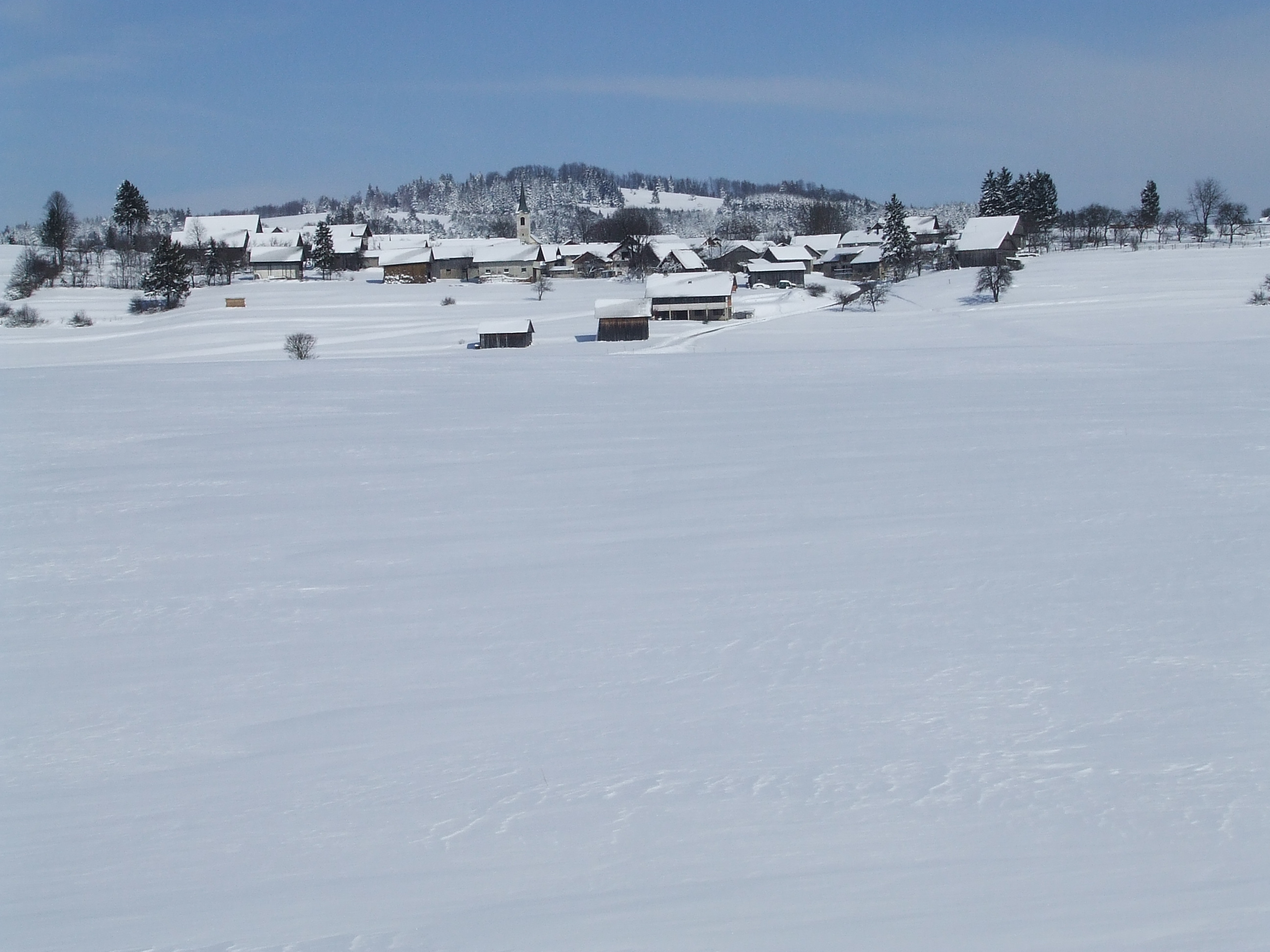

- Location in Slovenia
- Coordinates: 45°45′34.13″N 14°31′20.24″E
- Country: Slovenia
- Traditional region: Inner Carniola
- Statistical region: Littoral–Inner Carniola
- Municipality: Bloke

Area
  - Total: 2.79 km^{2} (1.08 sq mi)
- Elevation: 738.7 m (2,424 ft)

Population (2020)
  - Total: 54
  - Density: 19/km^{2} (50/sq mi)

Hudi Vrh (pronounced [ˈxuːdi ˈʋəɾx], German: Bösenberg) is a small village on a slight elevation south of Fara in the Municipality of Bloke in the Inner Carniola region of Slovenia.

== Name ==
Hudi Vrh was attested in written sources as Posenperg in 1436 and Pösen perg in 1499.

== Church ==
The local church in the settlement is dedicated to Saint Nicholas and belongs to the Parish of Bloke.
