= Rožanče =

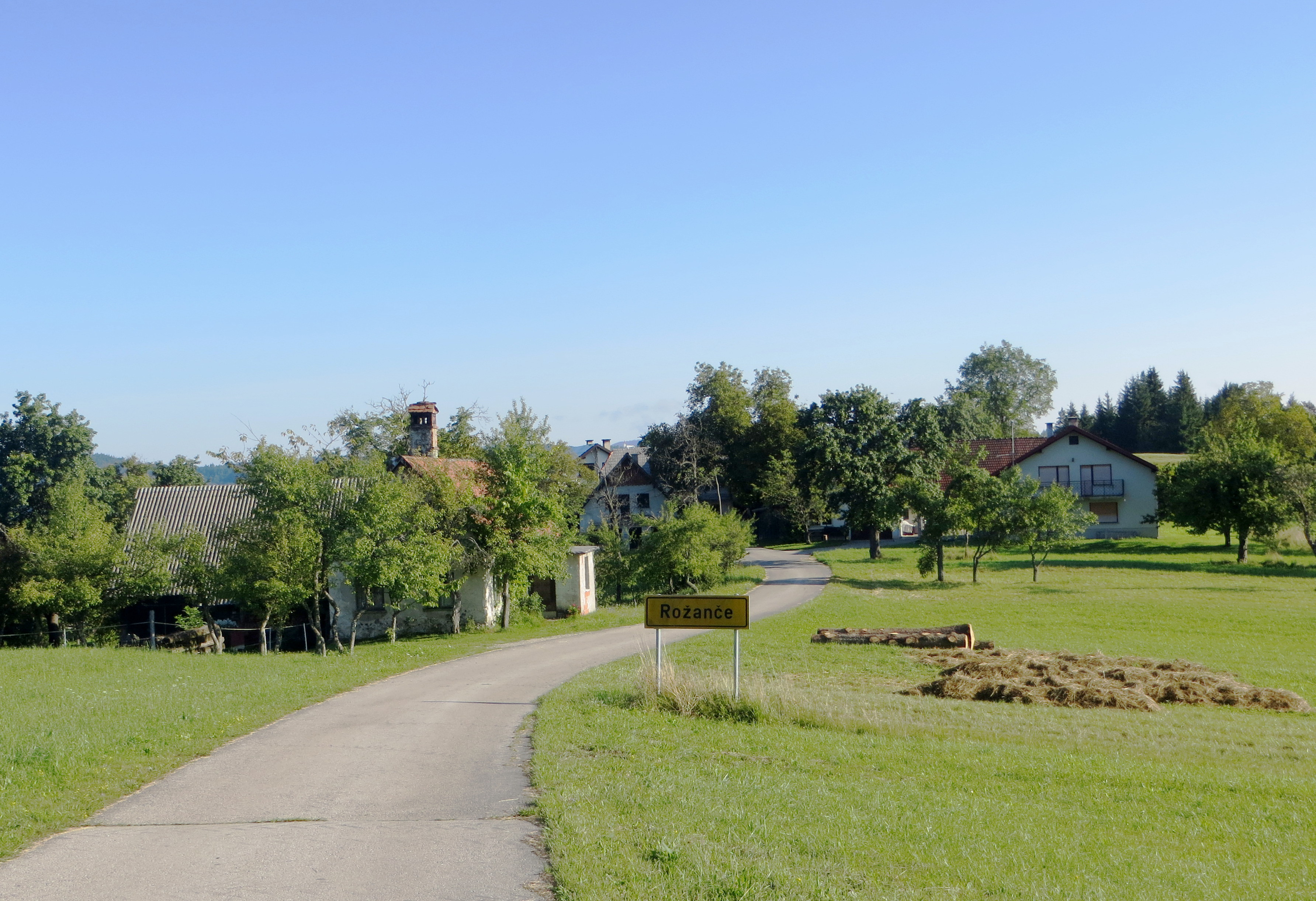

- Location in Slovenia
- Coordinates: 45°48′38.45″N 14°27′41.89″E
- Country: Slovenia
- Traditional region: Inner Carniola
- Statistical region: Littoral–Inner Carniola
- Municipality: Bloke

Area
  - Total: 1.2 km^{2} (0.46 sq mi)
- Elevation: 751.9 m (2,467 ft)

Population (2020)
  - Total: 8
  - Density: 6.7/km^{2} (17/sq mi)

Rožanče (pronounced [ɾɔˈʒaːntsɛ]) is a small settlement north of Velike Bloke in the Municipality of Bloke in the Inner Carniola region of Slovenia.
