= Ograda, Bloke =

Ograda
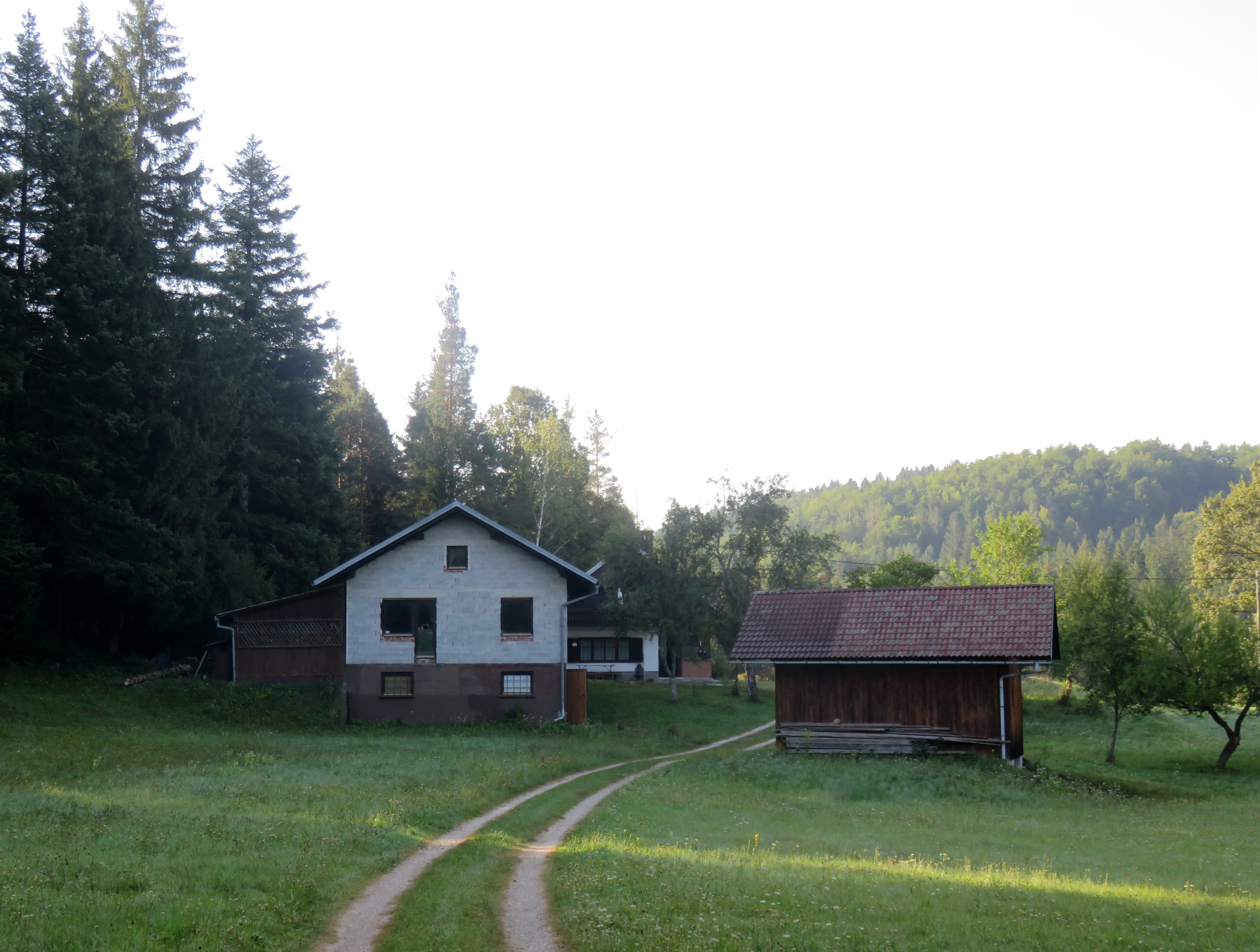

- Location in Slovenia
- Coordinates: 45°49′7.55″N 14°28′39.98″E
- Country: Slovenia
- Traditional region: Inner Carniola
- Statistical region: Littoral–Inner Carniola
- Municipality: Bloke

Area
  - Total: 0.31 km^{2} (0.12 sq mi)
- Elevation: 682.6 m (2,240 ft)

Population (2022)
  - Total: 6
  - Density: 19/km^{2} (50/sq mi)

Ograda (pronounced [ɔˈɡɾaːda]) is a small settlement north of Velike Bloke in the Municipality of Bloke in the Inner Carniola region of Slovenia.
