= Godičevo =

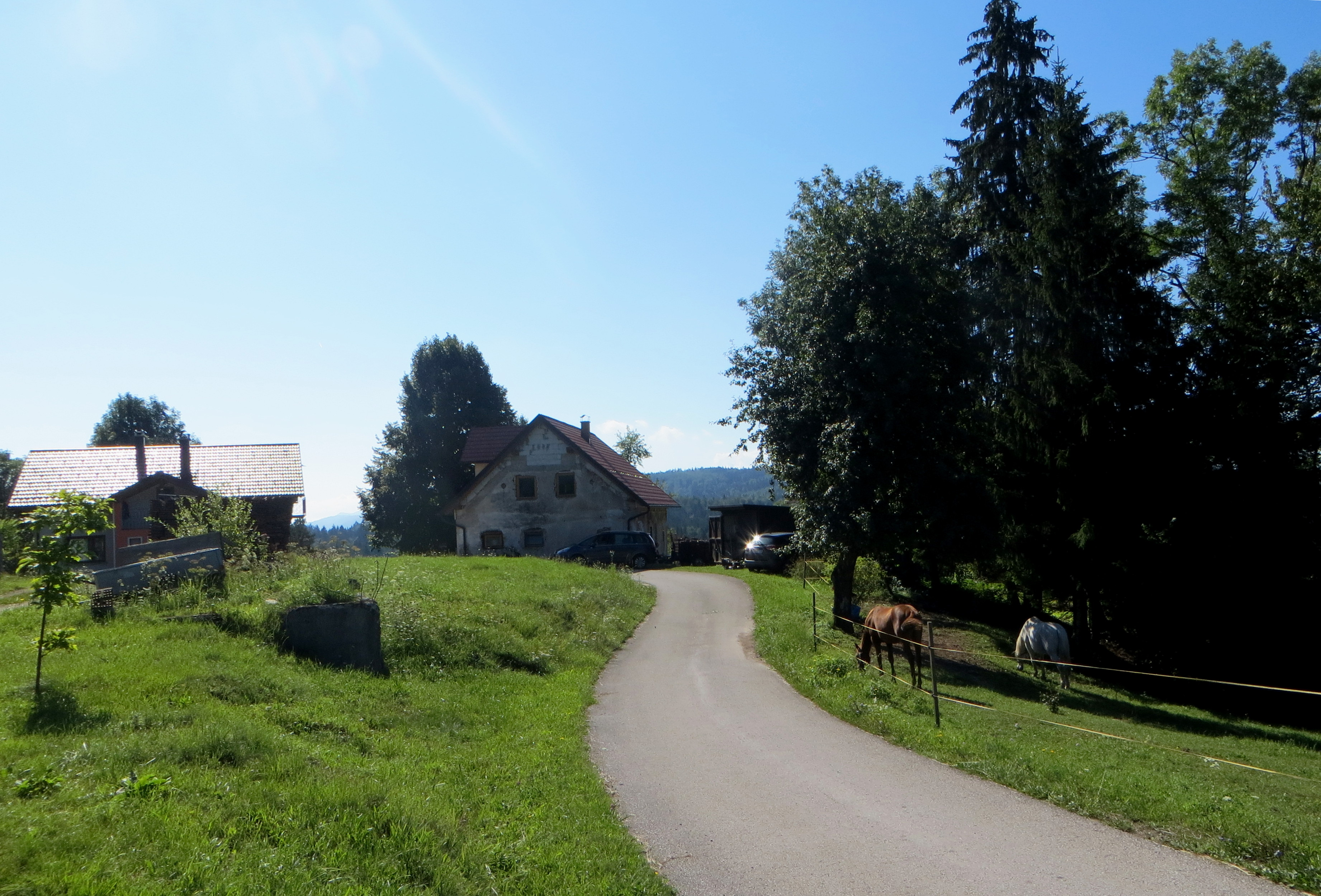

- Location in Slovenia
- Coordinates: 45°47′34.22″N 14°32′18.49″E
- Country: Slovenia
- Traditional region: Inner Carniola
- Statistical region: Littoral–Inner Carniola
- Municipality: Bloke

Area
  - Total: 0.61 km^{2} (0.24 sq mi)
- Elevation: 780.3 m (2,560 ft)

Population (2020)
  - Total: 5
  - Density: 8.2/km^{2} (21/sq mi)

Godičevo (pronounced [ɡɔˈdiːtʃɛʋɔ]) is small settlement northeast of Nova Vas in the Municipality of Bloke in the Inner Carniola region of Slovenia. It has six residents.
