= Ulaka, Bloke =

Ulaka
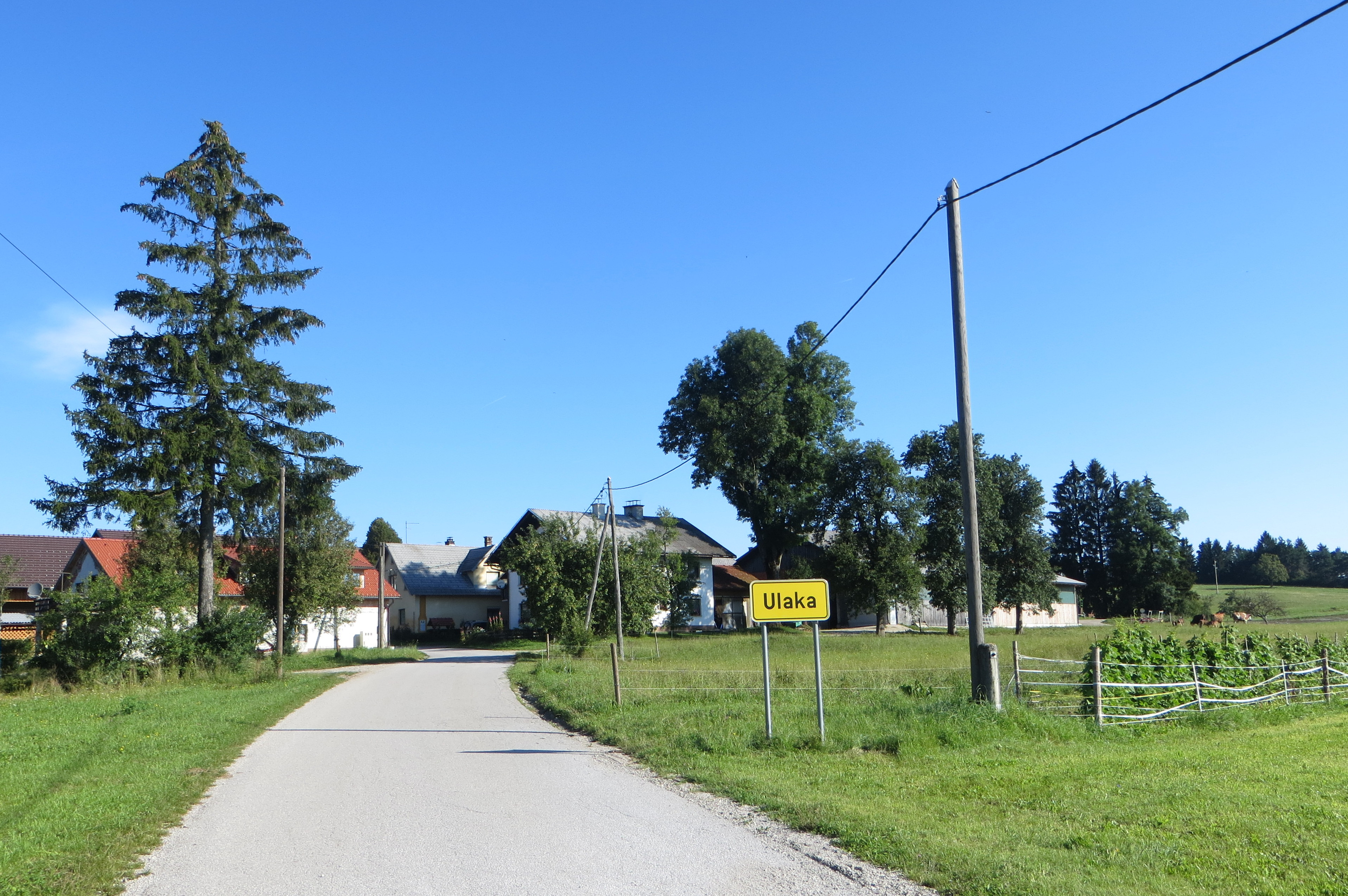

- Location in Slovenia
- Coordinates: 45°47′42.22″N 14°28′9.75″E
- Country: Slovenia
- Traditional region: Inner Carniola
- Statistical region: Littoral–Inner Carniola
- Municipality: Bloke

Area
  - Total: 1.63 km^{2} (0.63 sq mi)
- Elevation: 741.2 m (2,432 ft)

Population (2020)
  - Total: 43
  - Density: 26/km^{2} (68/sq mi)

Ulaka (pronounced [ˈuːlaka]) is a small village north of Velike Bloke in the Municipality of Bloke in the Inner Carniola region of Slovenia.

== Church ==
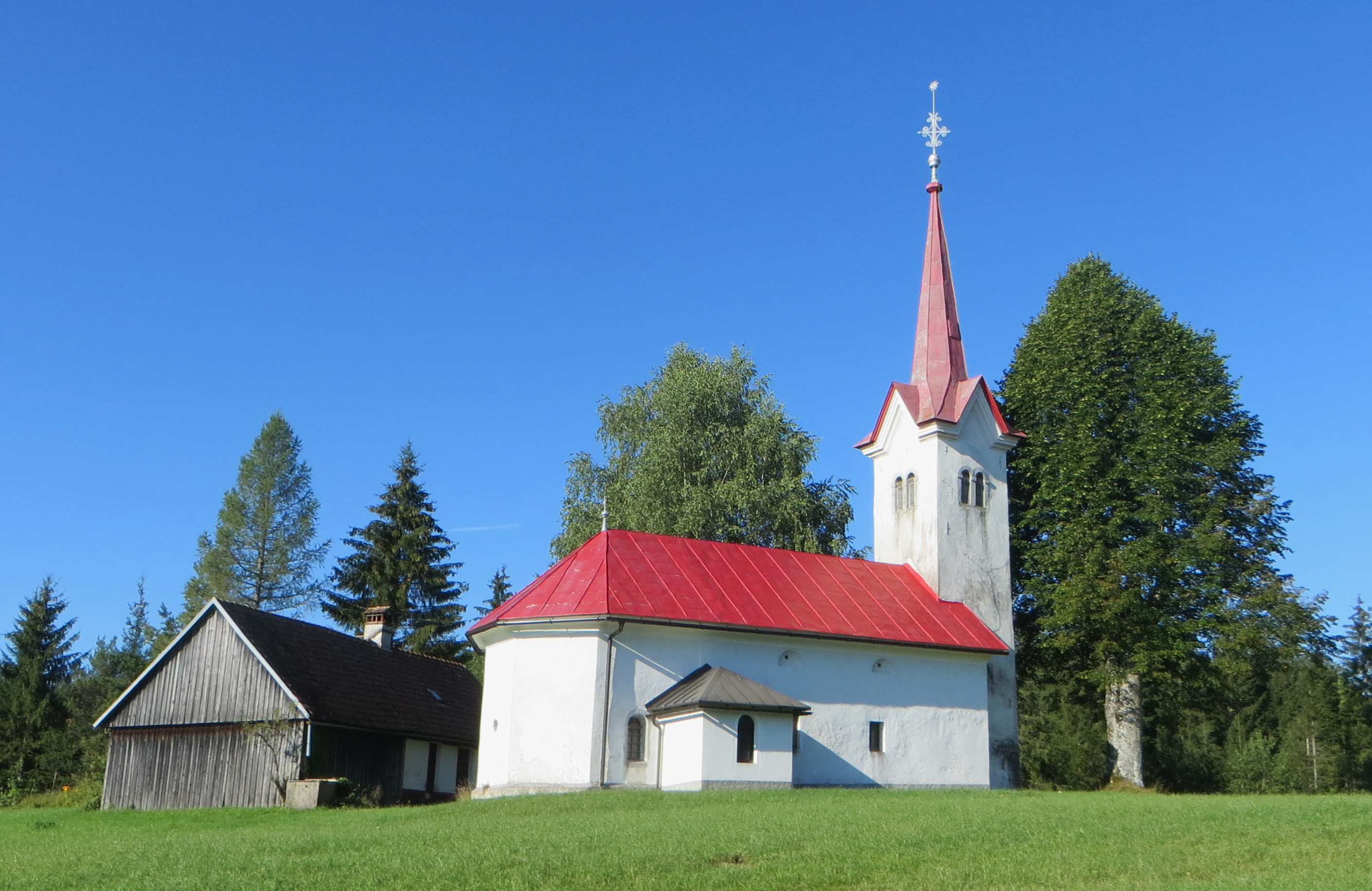
Saint Nicholas's Church

The local church, built north of the settlement, is dedicated to Saint Nicholas and belongs to the Parish of Sveta Trojica.
