= Zales, Bloke =

Zales
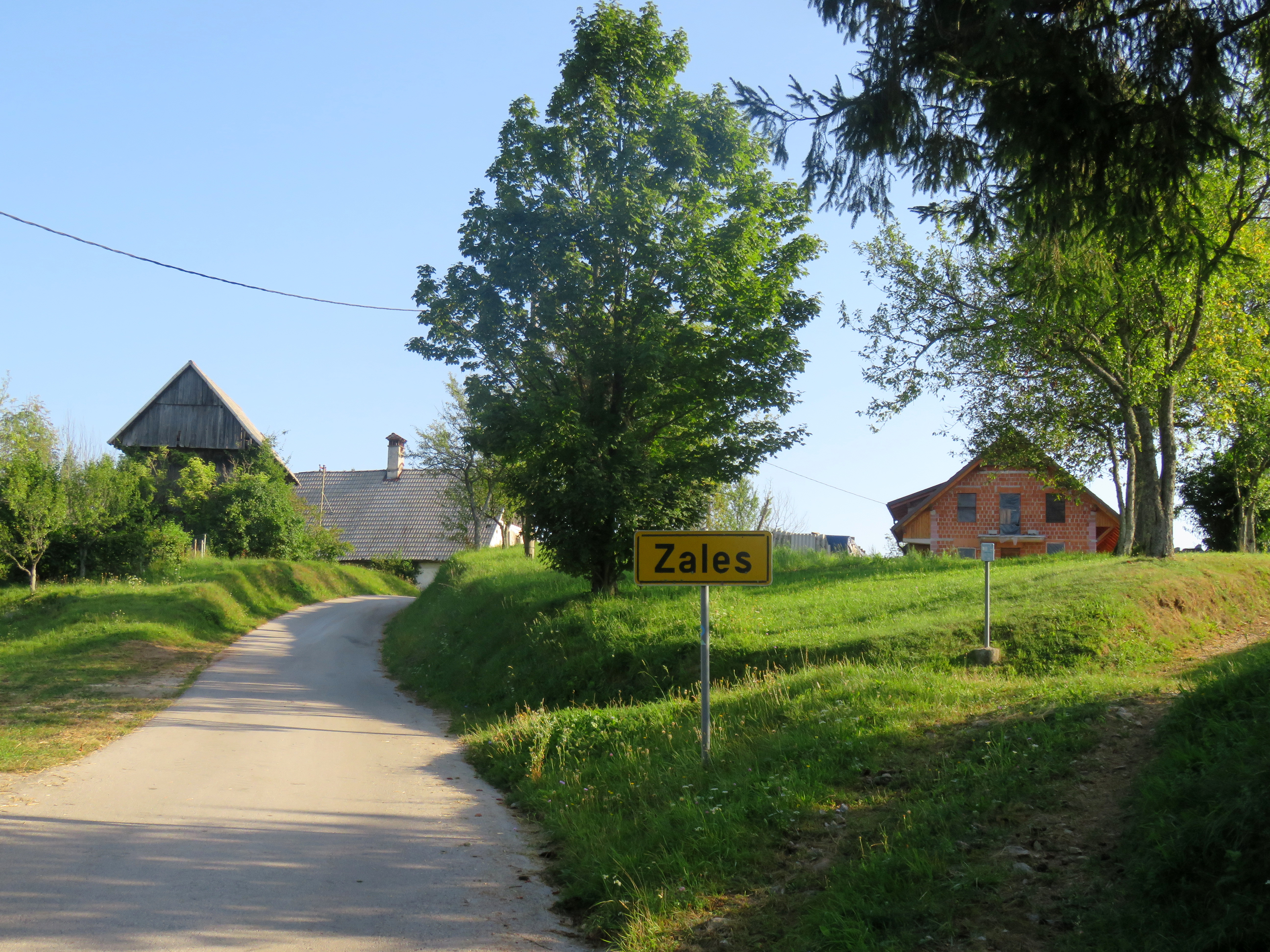

- Location in Slovenia
- Coordinates: 45°49′19.65″N 14°29′5.81″E
- Country: Slovenia
- Traditional region: Inner Carniola
- Statistical region: Littoral–Inner Carniola
- Municipality: Bloke

Area
  - Total: 0.98 km^{2} (0.38 sq mi)
- Elevation: 741.4 m (2,432 ft)

Population (2020)
  - Total: 6
  - Density: 6.1/km^{2} (16/sq mi)

Zales (pronounced [zaˈleːs], German: Saleis) is a small remote settlement north of Velike Bloke in the Municipality of Bloke in the Inner Carniola region of Slovenia.
