= Zakraj, Bloke =

Zakraj
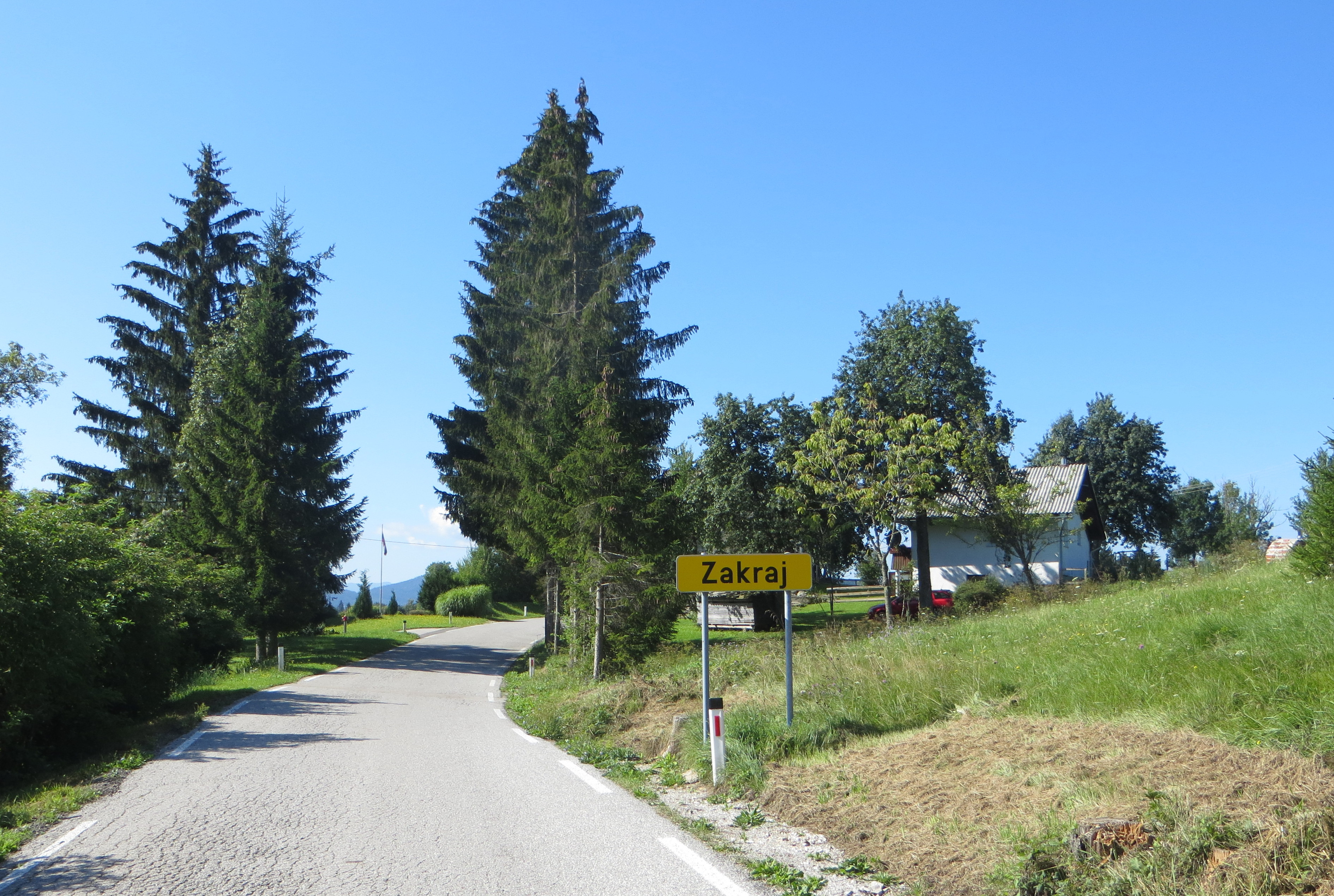

- Location in Slovenia
- Coordinates: 45°47′49.85″N 14°32′38.73″E
- Country: Slovenia
- Traditional region: Inner Carniola
- Statistical region: Littoral–Inner Carniola
- Municipality: Bloke

Area
  - Total: 1.3 km^{2} (0.50 sq mi)
- Elevation: 774.9 m (2,542 ft)

Population (2020)
  - Total: 4
  - Density: 3.1/km^{2} (8.0/sq mi)

Zakraj (pronounced [zaˈkɾai̯]) is a small settlement northeast of Nova Vas in the Municipality of Bloke in the Inner Carniola region of Slovenia.
