= Topol, Bloke =

Topol
- Location in Slovenia
- Coordinates: 45°45′16.5″N 14°32′6.66″E
- Country: Slovenia
- Traditional region: Inner Carniola
- Statistical region: Littoral–Inner Carniola
- Municipality: Bloke

Area
  - Total: 2.54 km^{2} (0.98 sq mi)
- Elevation: 722.2 m (2,369 ft)

Population (2020)
  - Total: 53
  - Density: 21/km^{2} (54/sq mi)

Topol (pronounced [ˈtɔːpɔu̯]) is a small settlement west of the village of Ravnik in the Municipality of Bloke in the Inner Carniola region of Slovenia.
