= Hribarjevo =

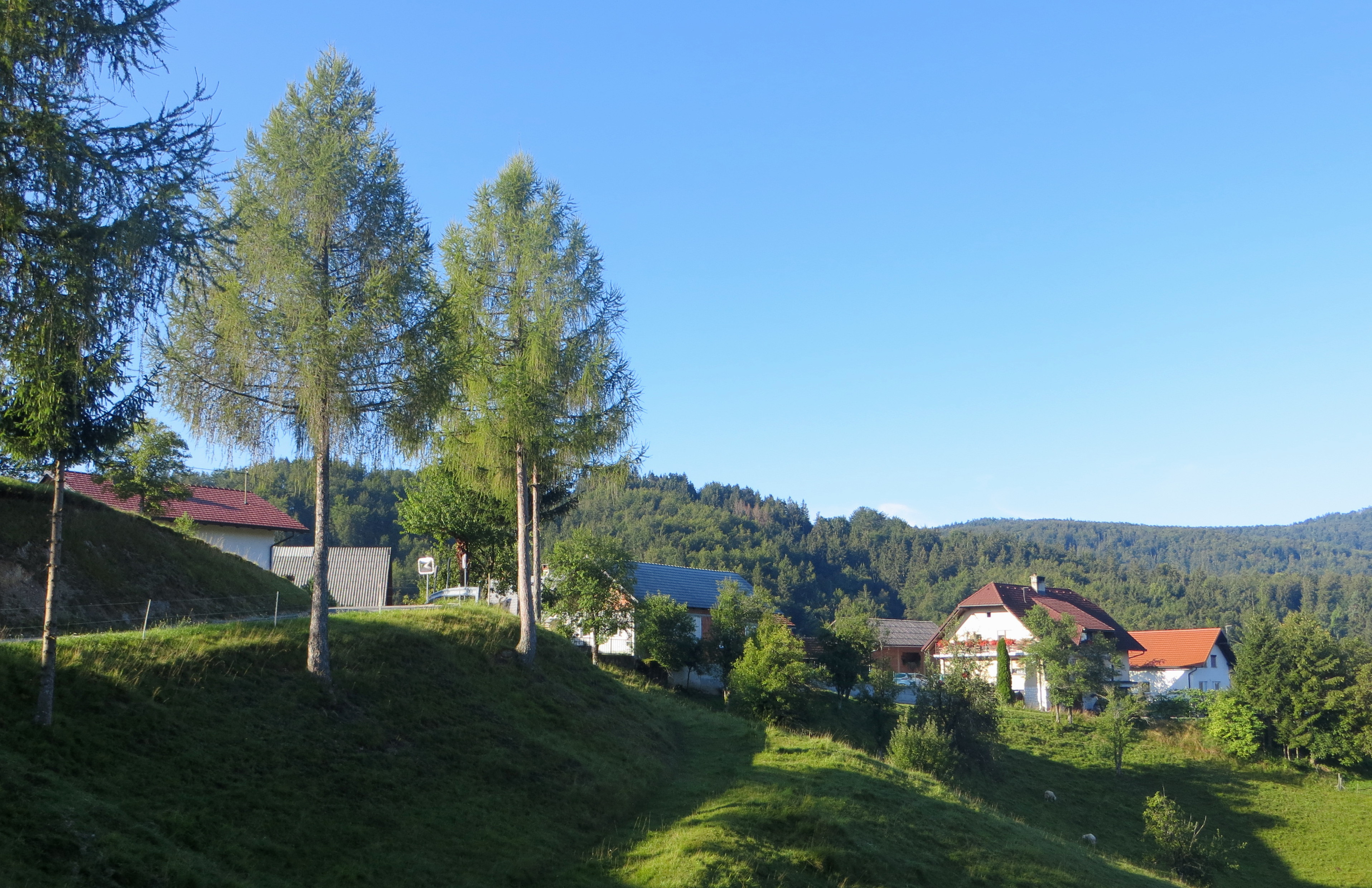

- Location in Slovenia
- Coordinates: 45°48′33.48″N 14°27′17.38″E
- Country: Slovenia
- Traditional region: Inner Carniola
- Statistical region: Littoral–Inner Carniola
- Municipality: Bloke

Area
  - Total: 0.75 km^{2} (0.29 sq mi)
- Elevation: 725.8 m (2,381 ft)

Population (2020)
  - Total: 19
  - Density: 25/km^{2} (66/sq mi)

Hribarjevo (pronounced [ˈxɾiːbaɾjɛʋɔ]) is a small settlement north of Velike Bloke in the Municipality of Bloke in the Inner Carniola region of Slovenia.
