= Andrejčje =

Andrejčje Andrejče (before 1990)
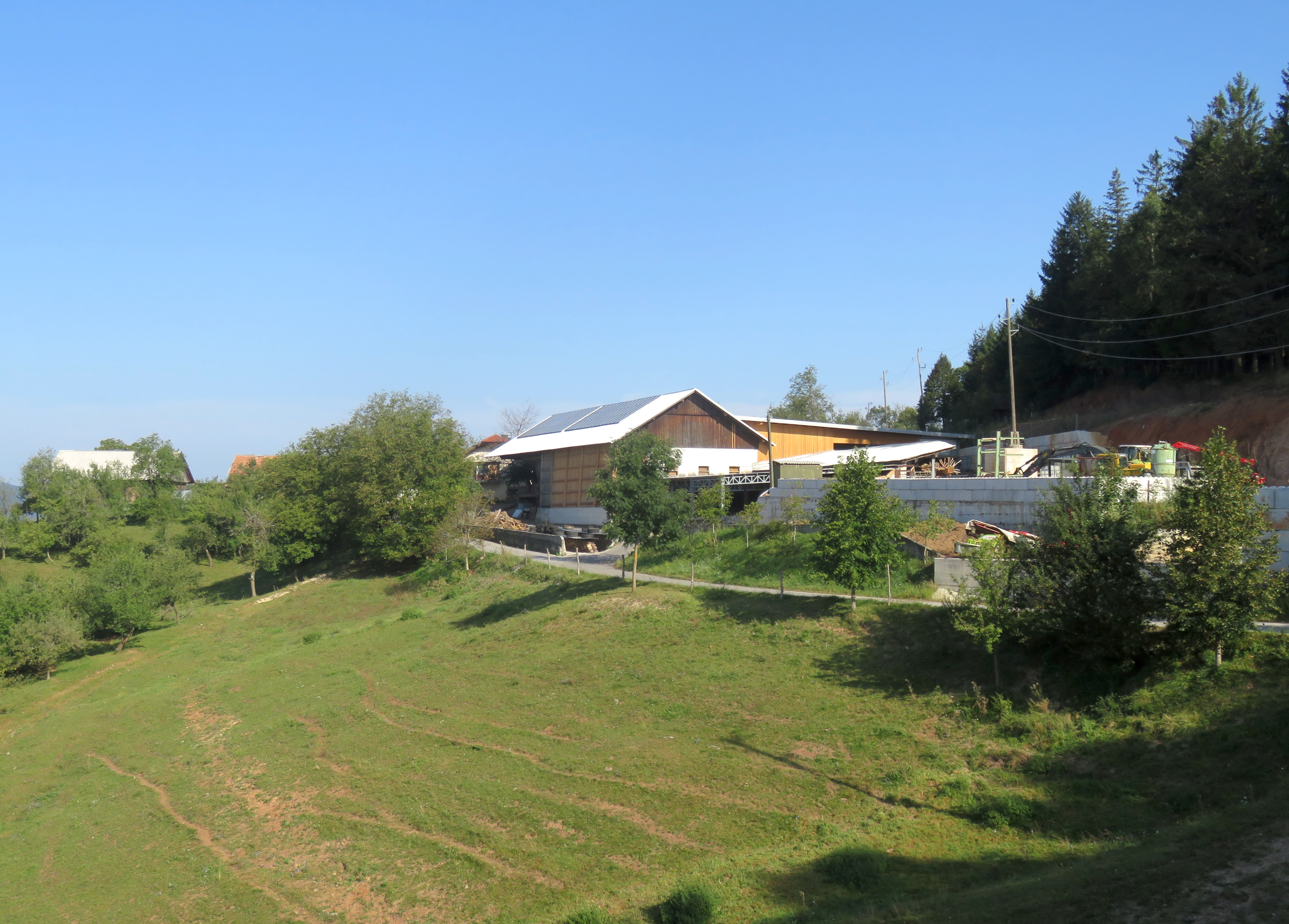

- Location in Slovenia
- Coordinates: 45°48′30.7″N 14°30′10.18″E
- Country: Slovenia
- Traditional region: Inner Carniola
- Statistical region: Littoral–Inner Carniola
- Municipality: Bloke

Area
  - Total: 0.65 km^{2} (0.25 sq mi)
- Elevation: 769.5 m (2,525 ft)

Population (2020)
  - Total: 8
  - Density: 12/km^{2} (32/sq mi)

Andrejčje (pronounced [anˈdɾeːi̯tʃɛ], in older sources Andrečje, German: Andreitsche) is a small settlement in the Municipality of Bloke in the Inner Carniola region of Slovenia.

== Name ==
Until 1990 the settlement was known as Andrejče.
