= Polšeče =

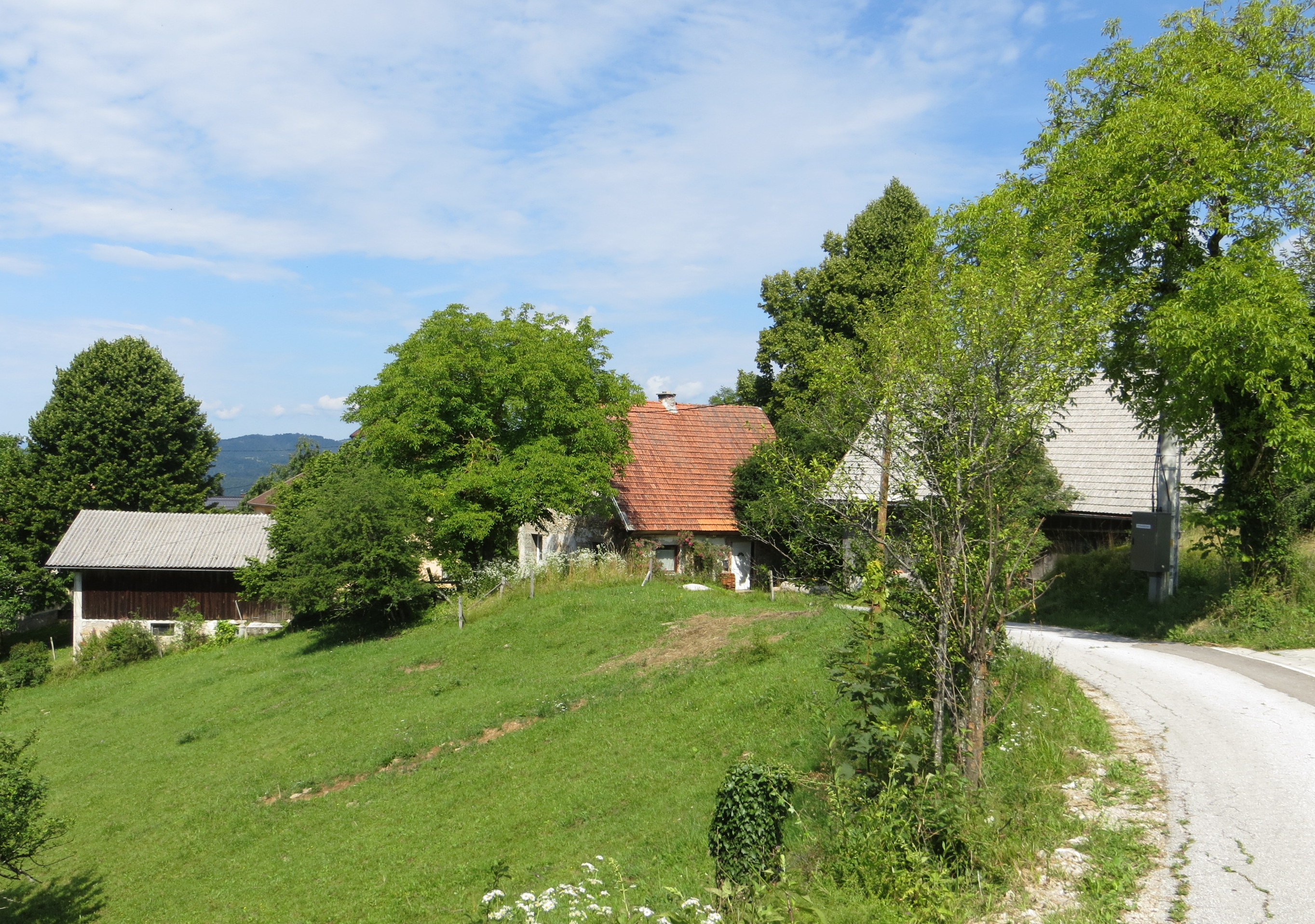

- Location in Slovenia
- Coordinates: 45°49′53.77″N 14°29′28.67″E
- Country: Slovenia
- Traditional region: Inner Carniola
- Statistical region: Littoral–Inner Carniola
- Municipality: Bloke

Area
  - Total: 1.19 km^{2} (0.46 sq mi)
- Elevation: 810.9 m (2,660 ft)

Population (2020)
  - Total: 13
  - Density: 11/km^{2} (28/sq mi)

Polšeče (pronounced [pɔu̯ˈʃeːtʃɛ]) is a small settlement in the hills north of Ravnik in the Municipality of Bloke in the Inner Carniola region of Slovenia.
