= Runarsko =

- Location in Slovenia
- Coordinates: 45°46′15.88″N 14°32′29.78″E
- Country: Slovenia
- Traditional region: Inner Carniola
- Statistical region: Littoral–Inner Carniola
- Municipality: Bloke

Area
  - Total: 2.15 km^{2} (0.83 sq mi)
- Elevation: 767 m (2,516 ft)

Population (2020)
  - Total: 69
  - Density: 32/km^{2} (83/sq mi)

Runarsko (pronounced [ˈɾuːnaɾskɔ]) is a small village east of Nova Vas in the Municipality of Bloke in the Inner Carniola region of Slovenia.

== Name ==
Runarsko was attested in historical sources as Wurnarisk and Runarisk in 1436, and as Runersko in 1505, among other spellings.

== Church ==
The local church in the settlement is dedicated to the Nativity of Mary and belongs to the Parish of Bloke.
