= Lovranovo =

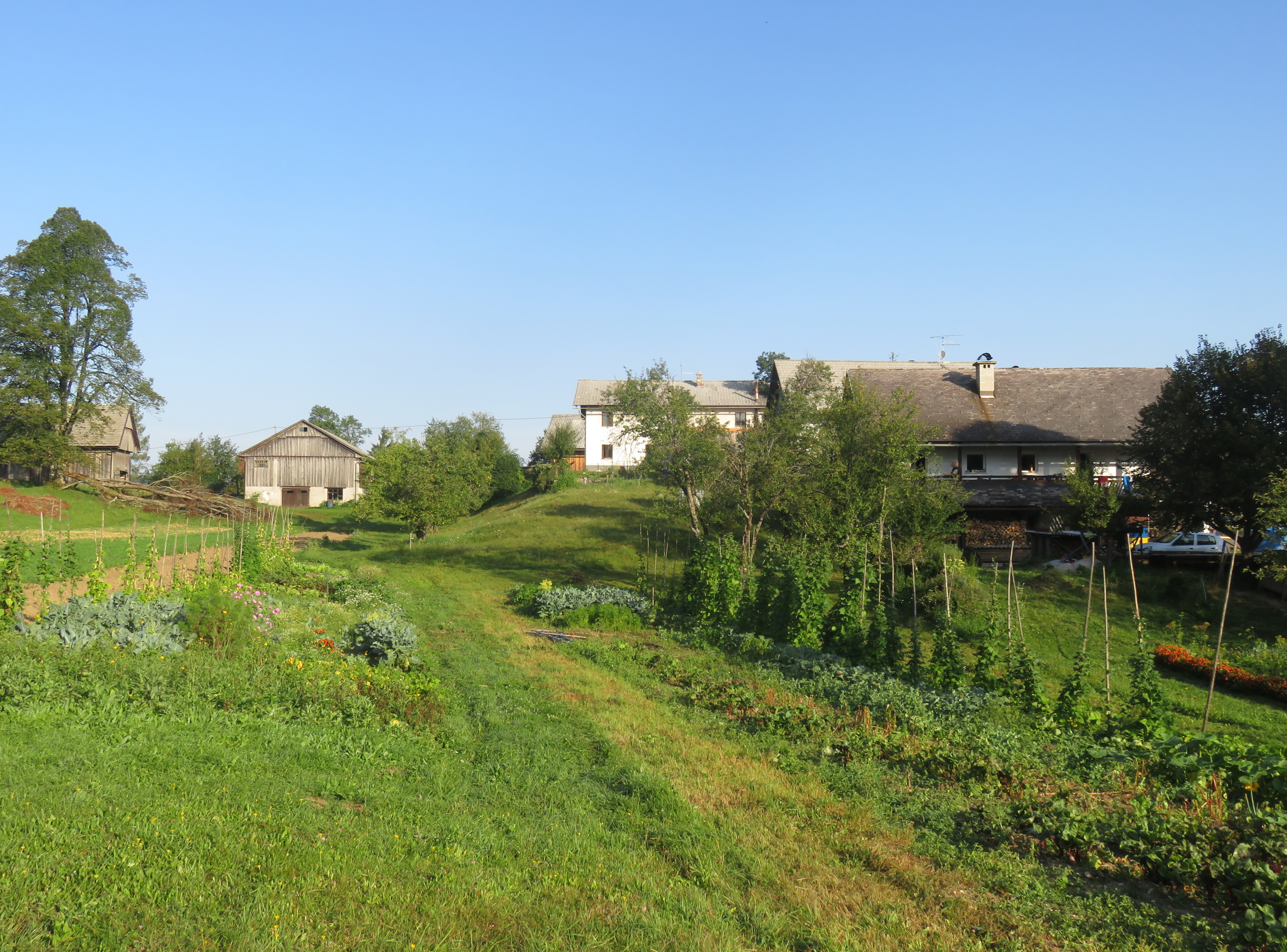

- Location in Slovenia
- Coordinates: 45°48′59.67″N 14°28′17.35″E
- Country: Slovenia
- Traditional region: Inner Carniola
- Statistical region: Littoral–Inner Carniola
- Municipality: Bloke

Area
  - Total: 0.53 km^{2} (0.20 sq mi)
- Elevation: 684.5 m (2,246 ft)

Population (2020)
  - Total: 25
  - Density: 47/km^{2} (120/sq mi)

Lovranovo (pronounced [lɔˈwɾaːnɔʋɔ]) is a small settlement north of Velike Bloke in the Municipality of Bloke in the Inner Carniola region of Slovenia.
