= Sleme, Bloke =

Sleme
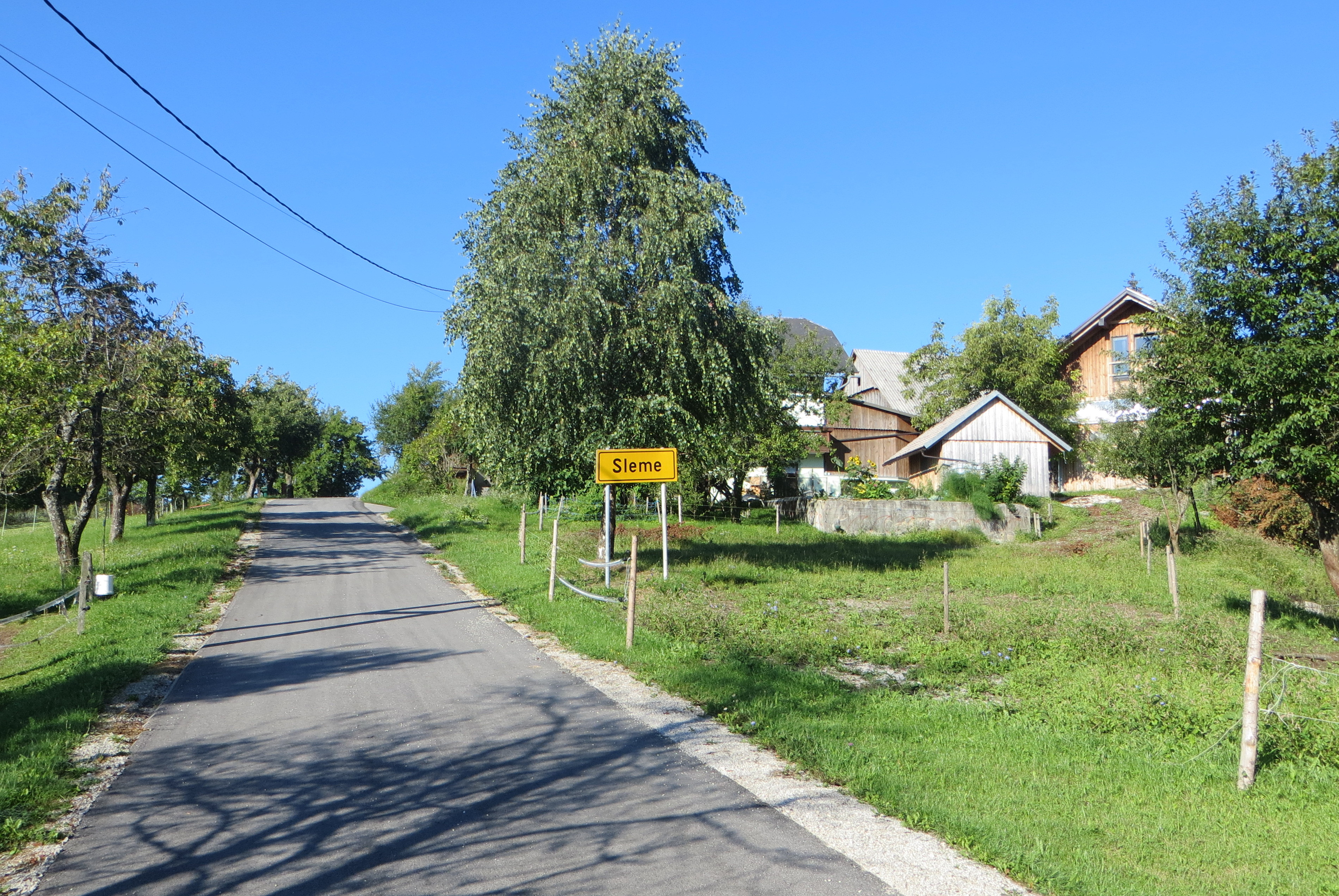

- Location in Slovenia
- Coordinates: 45°48′12.13″N 14°27′24.54″E
- Country: Slovenia
- Traditional region: Inner Carniola
- Statistical region: Littoral–Inner Carniola
- Municipality: Bloke

Area
  - Total: 1.29 km^{2} (0.50 sq mi)
- Elevation: 787 m (2,582 ft)

Population (2020)
  - Total: 8
  - Density: 6.2/km^{2} (16/sq mi)

Sleme (pronounced [ˈslɛːmɛ]; in older sources also Gorenje Sleme, German: Oberslemen) is a small settlement northwest of Velike Bloke in the Municipality of Bloke in the Inner Carniola region of Slovenia.
