= Studenec na Blokah =

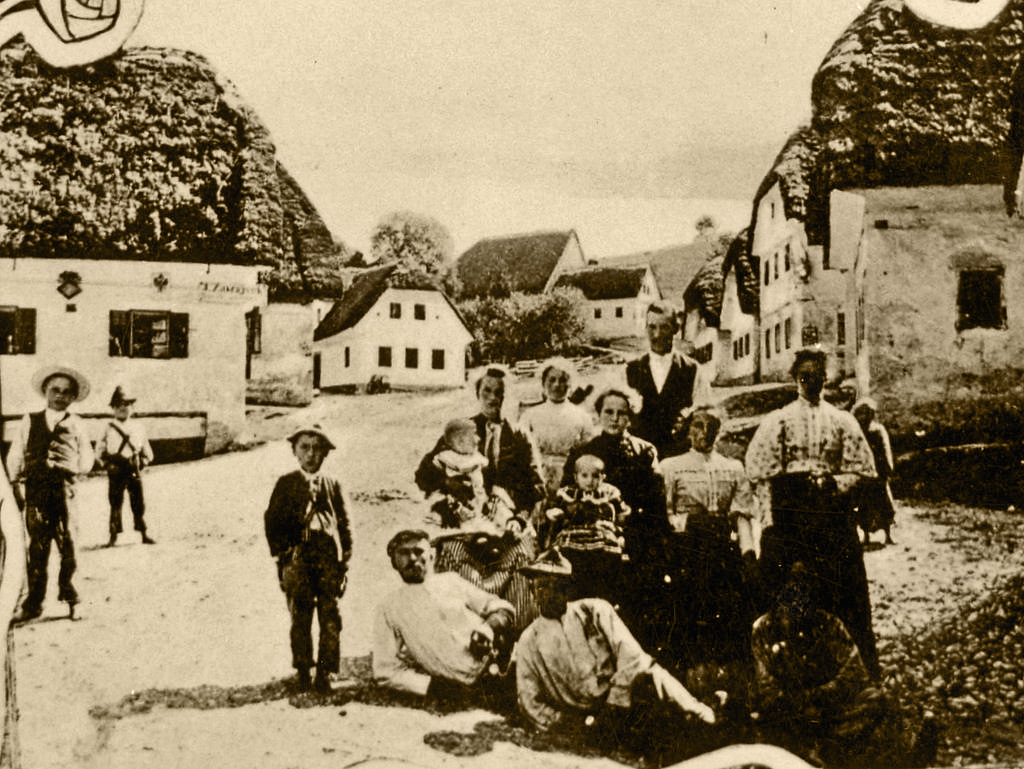
- 1905 postcard of Studenec na Blokah

- Location in Slovenia
- Coordinates: 45°45′56.34″N 14°32′4.48″E
- Country: Slovenia
- Traditional region: Inner Carniola
- Statistical region: Littoral–Inner Carniola
- Municipality: Bloke

Area
  - Total: 2.68 km^{2} (1.03 sq mi)
- Elevation: 762.8 m (2,503 ft)

Population (2020)
  - Total: 62
  - Density: 23/km^{2} (60/sq mi)

Studenec na Blokah (pronounced [stuˈdɛ̀ːnəts na ˈblòːkax, - ˈblóː-], German: Studenz) is a small village east of Nova Vas in the Municipality of Bloke in the Inner Carniola region of Slovenia.

== Name ==
The name of the settlement was changed from Studenec to Studenec na Blokah in 1953.

== Church ==
The local church in the settlement is dedicated to Saint Peter and belongs to the Parish of Bloke.
