= Bočkovo =

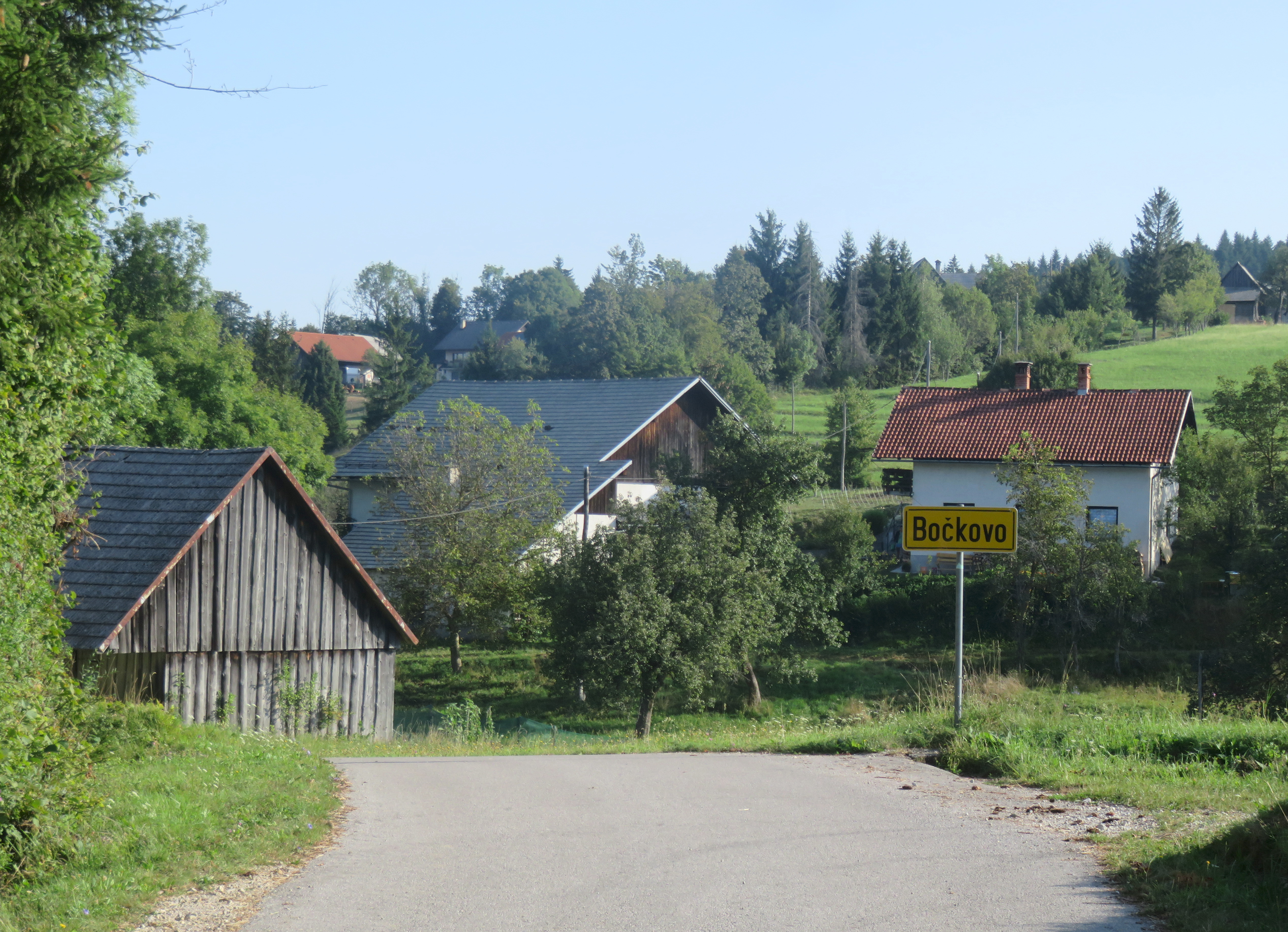

- Location in Slovenia
- Coordinates: 45°48′58.53″N 14°28′50.72″E
- Country: Slovenia
- Traditional region: Inner Carniola
- Statistical region: Littoral–Inner Carniola
- Municipality: Bloke

Area
  - Total: 0.44 km^{2} (0.17 sq mi)
- Elevation: 735.8 m (2,414 ft)

Population (2020)
  - Total: 16
  - Density: 36/km^{2} (94/sq mi)

Bočkovo (pronounced [ˈboːtʃkɔʋɔ]) is a small settlement north of Velike Bloke in the Municipality of Bloke in the Inner Carniola region of Slovenia.
