= Mramorovo pri Lužarjih =

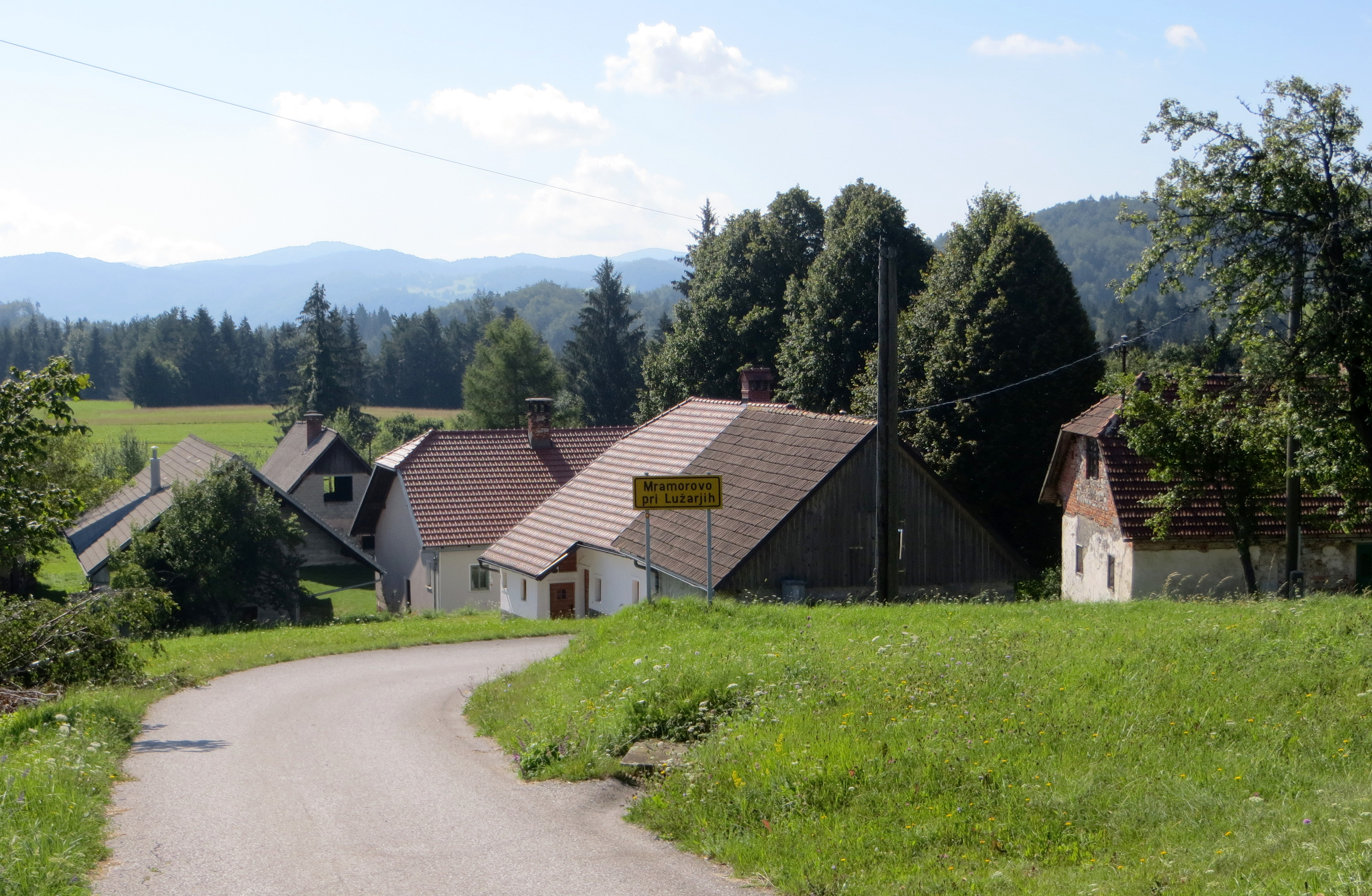

- Location in Slovenia
- Coordinates: 45°47′34.74″N 14°33′6.64″E
- Country: Slovenia
- Traditional region: Inner Carniola
- Statistical region: Littoral–Inner Carniola
- Municipality: Bloke

Area
  - Total: 1.45 km^{2} (0.56 sq mi)
- Elevation: 769.1 m (2,523 ft)

Population (2020)
  - Total: 2
  - Density: 1.4/km^{2} (3.6/sq mi)

Mramorovo pri Lužarjih (pronounced [mɾaˈmoːɾɔʋɔ pɾi ˈluːʒaɾjix]) is a small settlement northeast of Nova Vas in the Municipality of Bloke in the Inner Carniola region of Slovenia. It no longer has any permanent residents.
