= Benete =

- Location in Slovenia
- Coordinates: 45°46′9.72″N 14°33′53.14″E
- Country: Slovenia
- Traditional region: Inner Carniola
- Statistical region: Littoral–Inner Carniola
- Municipality: Bloke

Area
  - Total: 1.57 km^{2} (0.61 sq mi)
- Elevation: 806.1 m (2,645 ft)

Population (2020)
  - Total: 12
  - Density: 7.6/km^{2} (20/sq mi)

Benete (pronounced [bɛˈneːtɛ]) is a small settlement in the hills east of Nova Vas in the Municipality of Bloke in the Inner Carniola region of Slovenia.
