= Lahovo =

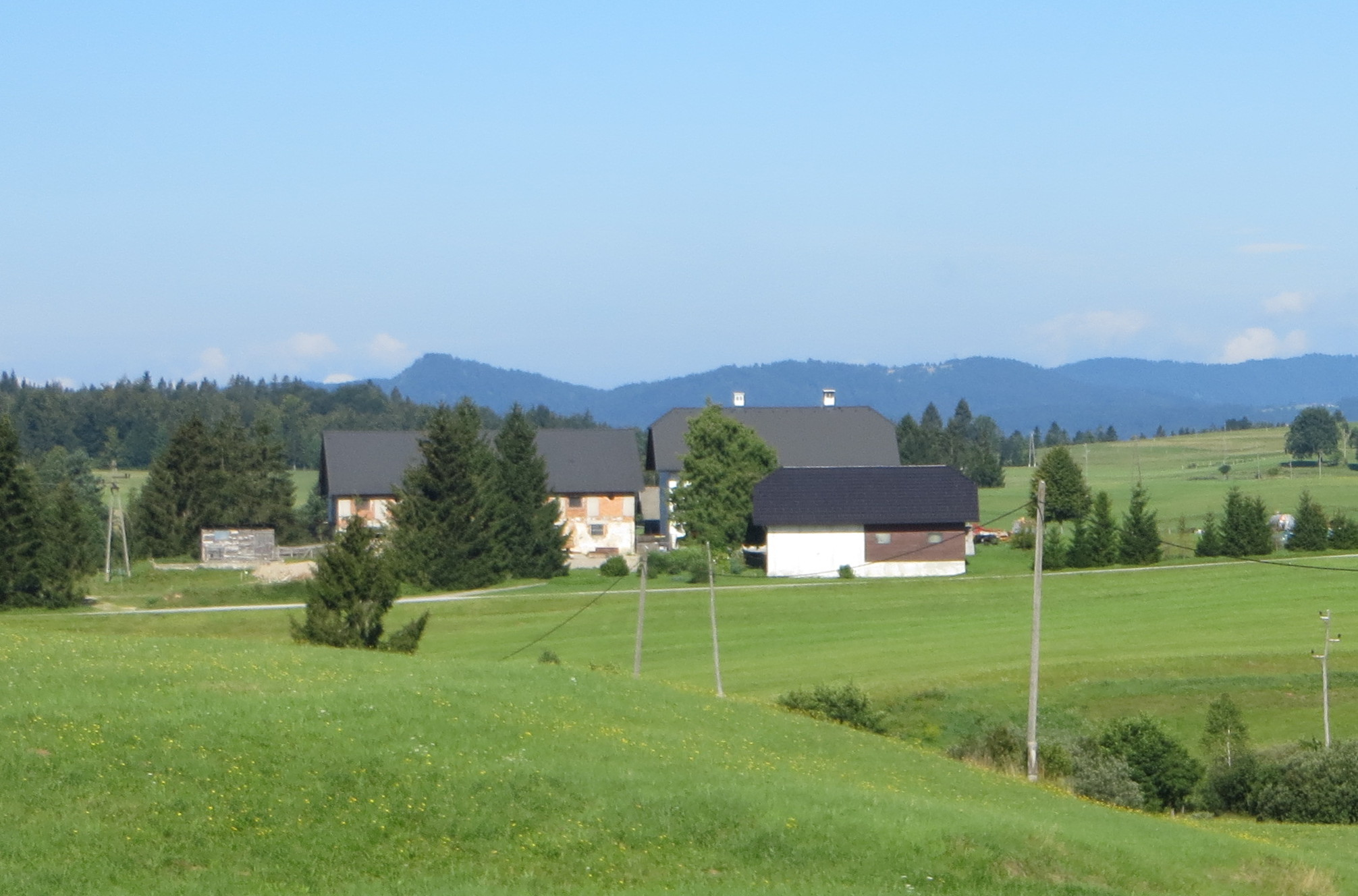

- Location in Slovenia
- Coordinates: 45°47′58.21″N 14°31′2.34″E
- Country: Slovenia
- Traditional region: Inner Carniola
- Statistical region: Littoral–Inner Carniola
- Municipality: Bloke

Area
  - Total: 0.52 km^{2} (0.20 sq mi)
- Elevation: 751.5 m (2,466 ft)

Population (2020)
  - Total: 8
  - Density: 15/km^{2} (40/sq mi)

Lahovo (pronounced [ˈlaːxɔʋɔ]) is a small settlement north of Nova Vas in the Municipality of Bloke in the Inner Carniola region of Slovenia.
