= Studeno na Blokah =

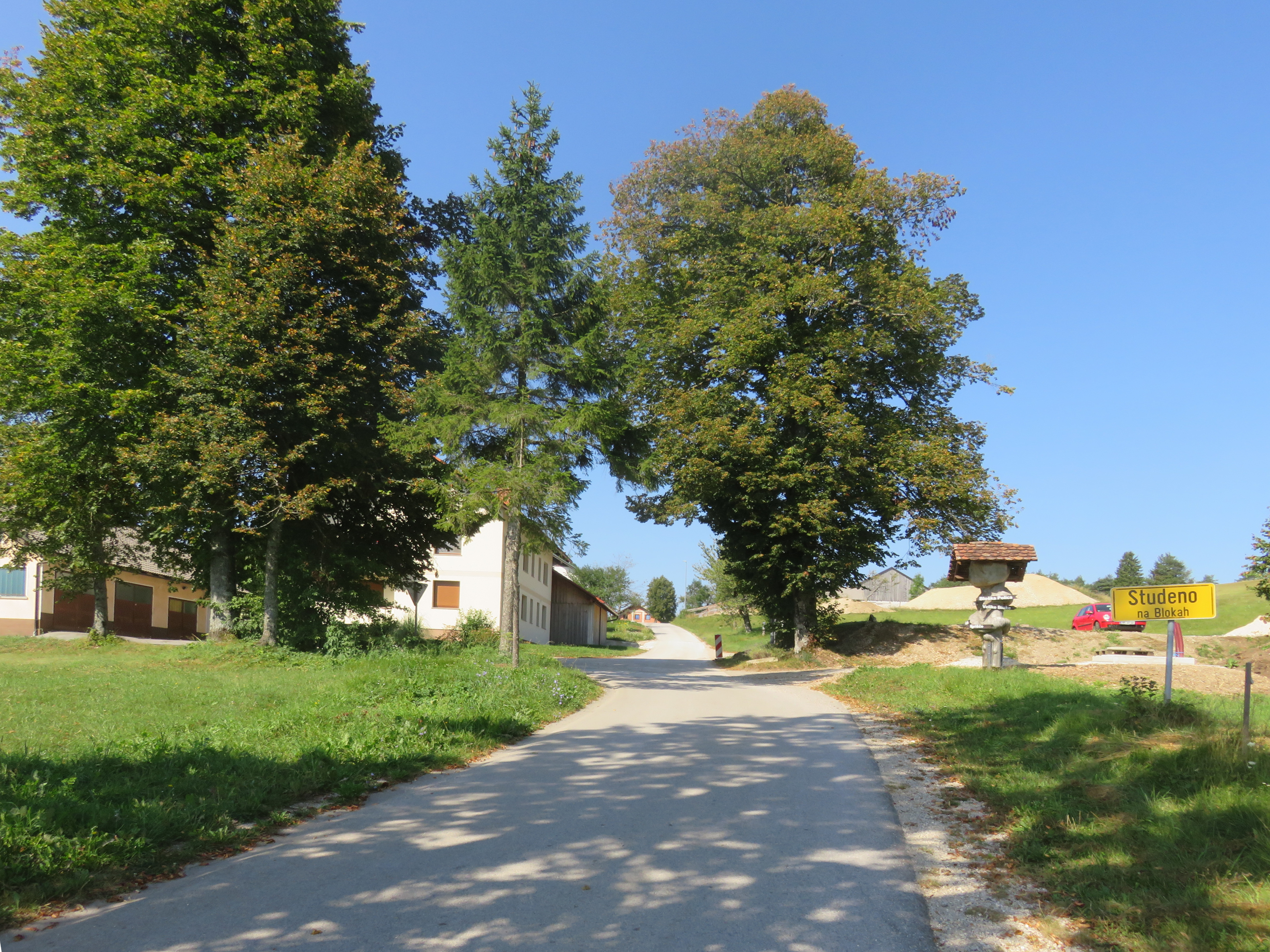

- Location in Slovenia
- Coordinates: 45°46′21.69″N 14°28′38.74″E
- Country: Slovenia
- Traditional region: Inner Carniola
- Statistical region: Littoral–Inner Carniola
- Municipality: Bloke

Area
  - Total: 1.54 km^{2} (0.59 sq mi)
- Elevation: 782.7 m (2,568 ft)

Population (2020)
  - Total: 42
  - Density: 27/km^{2} (71/sq mi)

Studeno na Blokah (pronounced [stuˈdéːnɔ na ˈblòːkax, -ˈdɛ̀ː-, - ˈblóː-]) is a small village west of Nova Vas in the Municipality of Bloke in the Inner Carniola region of Slovenia.

== Name ==
Studeno na Blokah was attested in historical sources as Chaltenvelt in 1332 and Kaltenfeld in 1436, among other spellings. The name of the settlement was changed from Studeno to Studeno na Blokah in 1953.

== Church ==
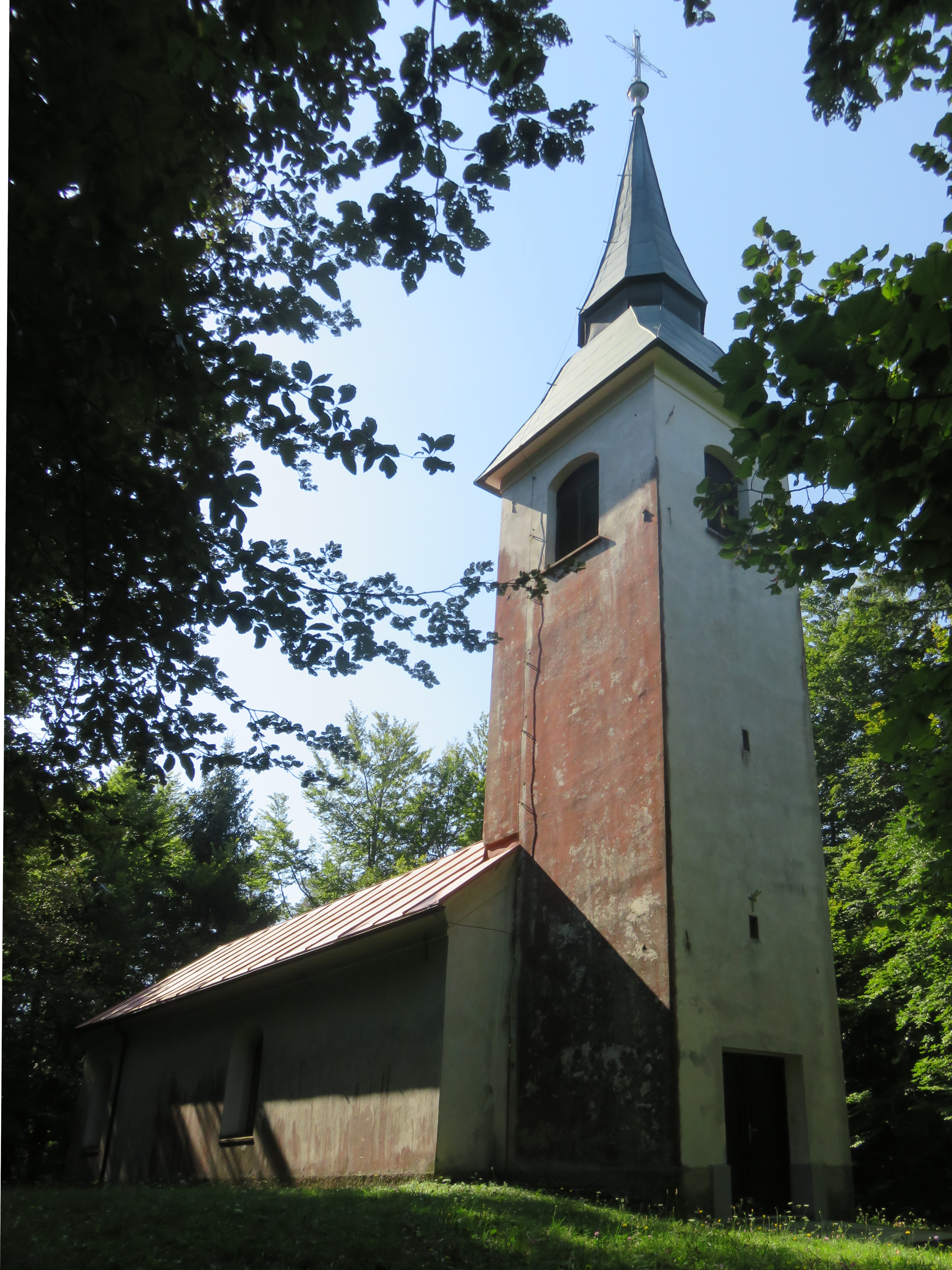
John the Baptist Church

The local church, built just south of the settlement, is dedicated to John the Baptist and belongs to the Parish of Bloke.
