= Radlek =

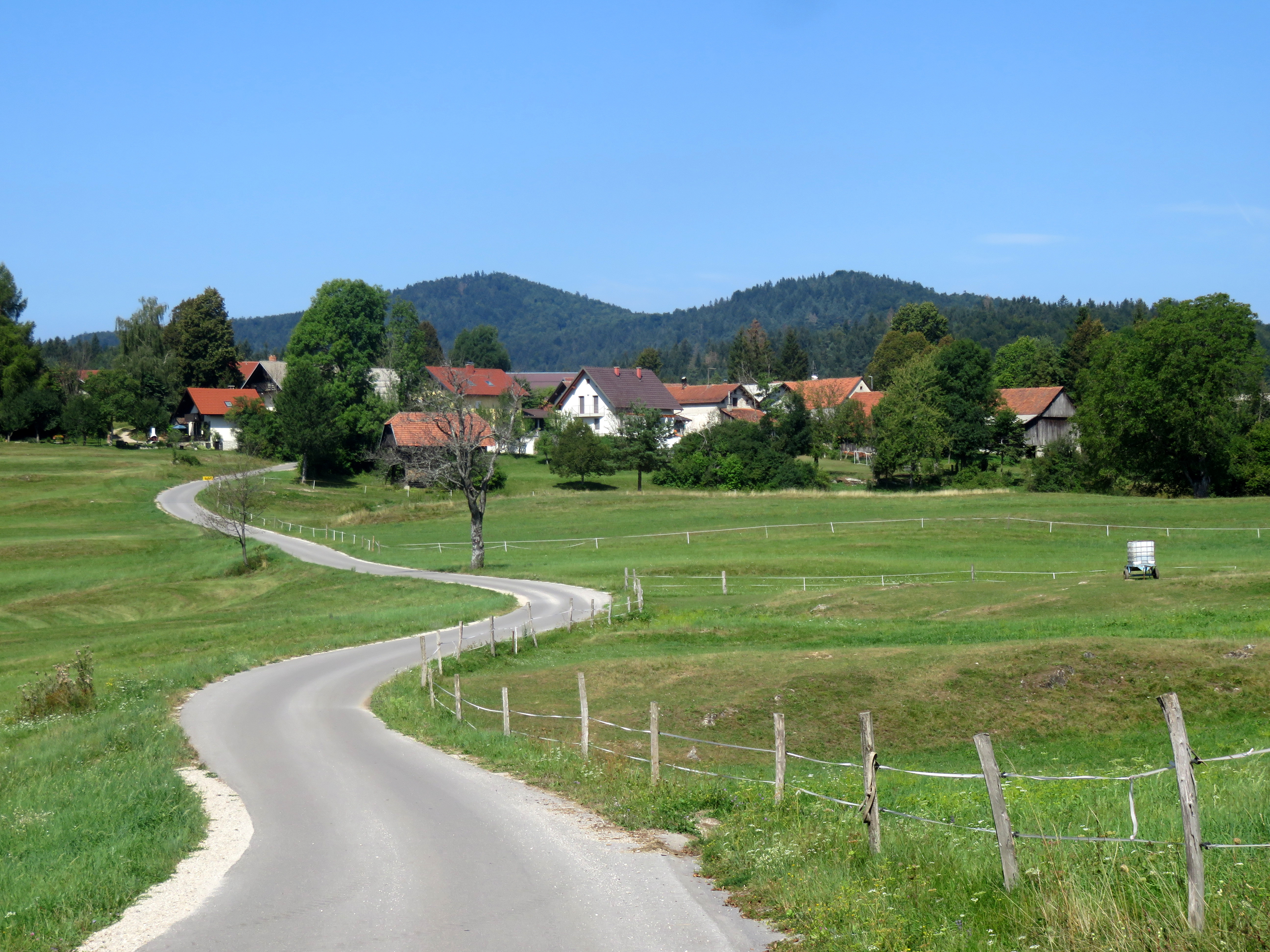

- Location in Slovenia
- Coordinates: 45°46′55.74″N 14°27′35.46″E
- Country: Slovenia
- Traditional region: Inner Carniola
- Statistical region: Littoral–Inner Carniola
- Municipality: Bloke

Area
  - Total: 3.44 km^{2} (1.33 sq mi)
- Elevation: 779.2 m (2,556 ft)

Population (2020)
  - Total: 35
  - Density: 10/km^{2} (26/sq mi)

Radlek (pronounced [ˈɾaːdlɛk], in older sources Radljak) is a small settlement west of Velike Bloke in the Municipality of Bloke in the Inner Carniola region of Slovenia.
