= Lepi Vrh =

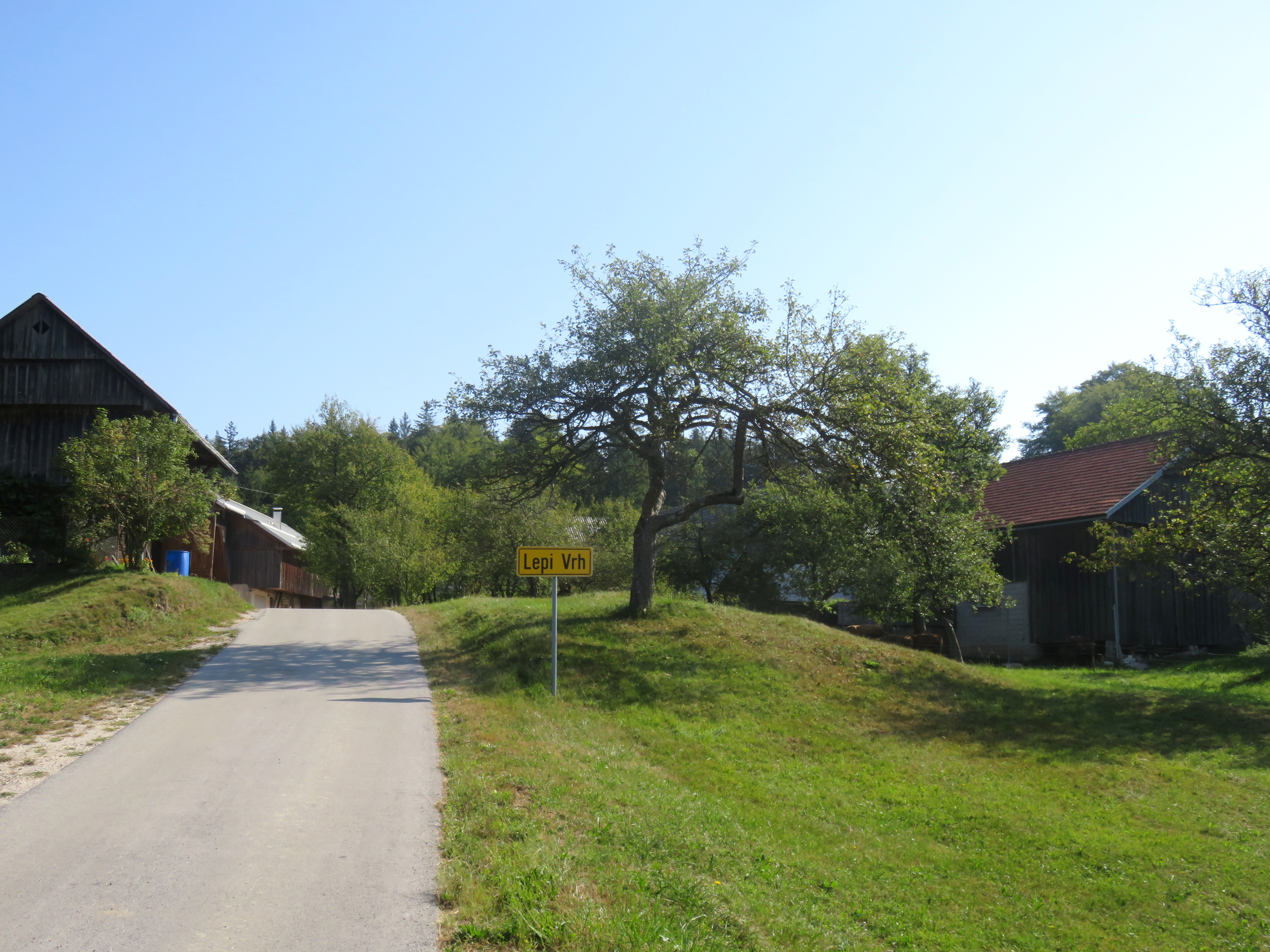

- Location in Slovenia
- Coordinates: 45°48′47.82″N 14°31′14.42″E
- Country: Slovenia
- Traditional region: Inner Carniola
- Statistical region: Littoral–Inner Carniola
- Municipality: Bloke

Area
  - Total: 2.31 km^{2} (0.89 sq mi)
- Elevation: 781.3 m (2,563 ft)

Population (2020)
  - Total: 11
  - Density: 4.8/km^{2} (12/sq mi)

Lepi Vrh (pronounced [ˈleːpi ˈʋəɾx]) is a small settlement northeast of Velike Bloke in the Municipality of Bloke in the Inner Carniola region of Slovenia.
