= Malni =

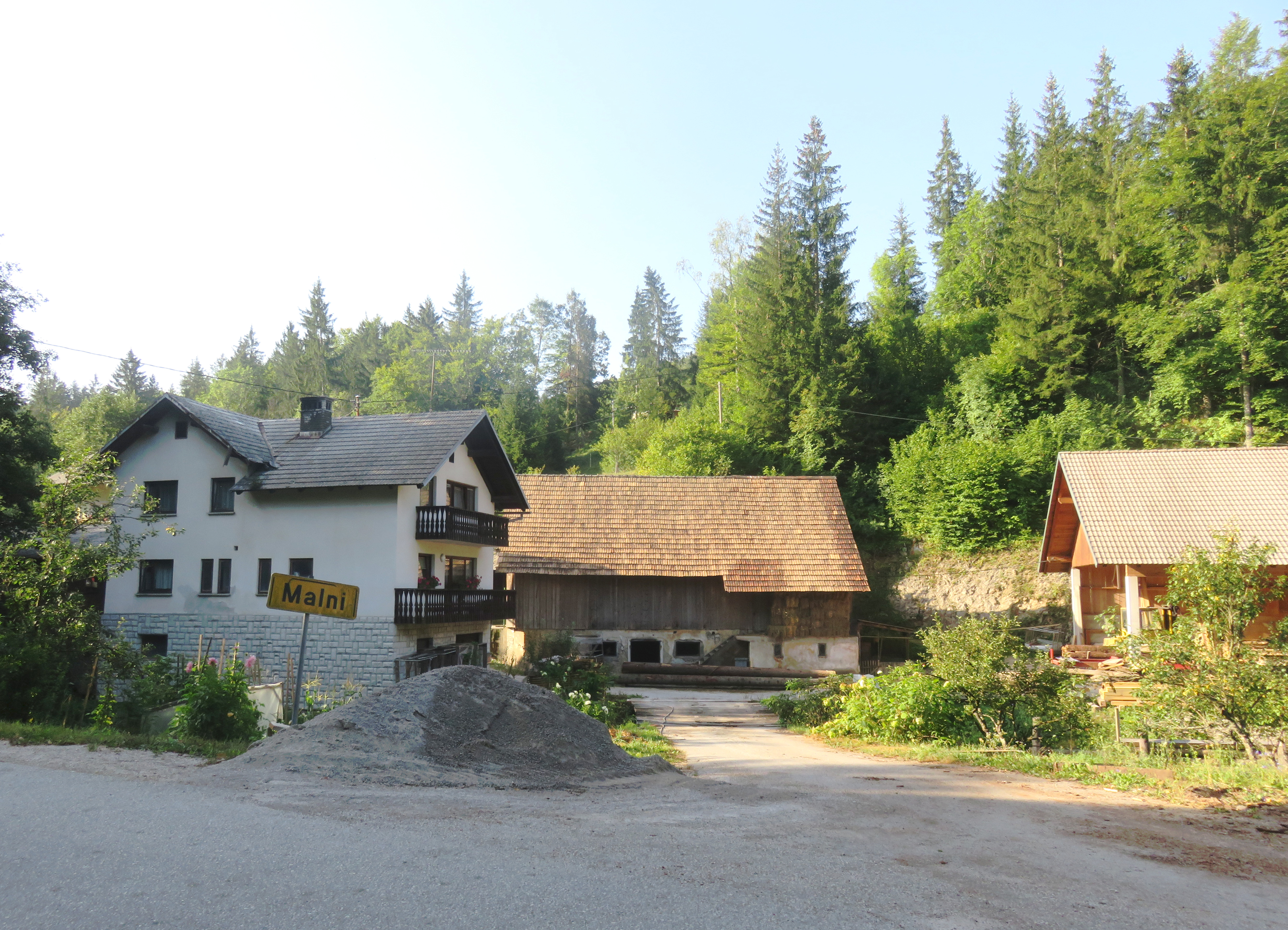

- Location in Slovenia
- Coordinates: 45°48′48.06″N 14°28′28.58″E
- Country: Slovenia
- Traditional region: Inner Carniola
- Statistical region: Littoral–Inner Carniola
- Municipality: Bloke

Area
  - Total: 0.1 km^{2} (0.039 sq mi)
- Elevation: 704.4 m (2,311 ft)

Population (2020)
  - Total: 5
  - Density: 50/km^{2} (130/sq mi)

Malni (pronounced [ˈmaːlni]) is a small settlement north of Velike Bloke in the Municipality of Bloke in the Inner Carniola region of Slovenia.
