= Škufče =

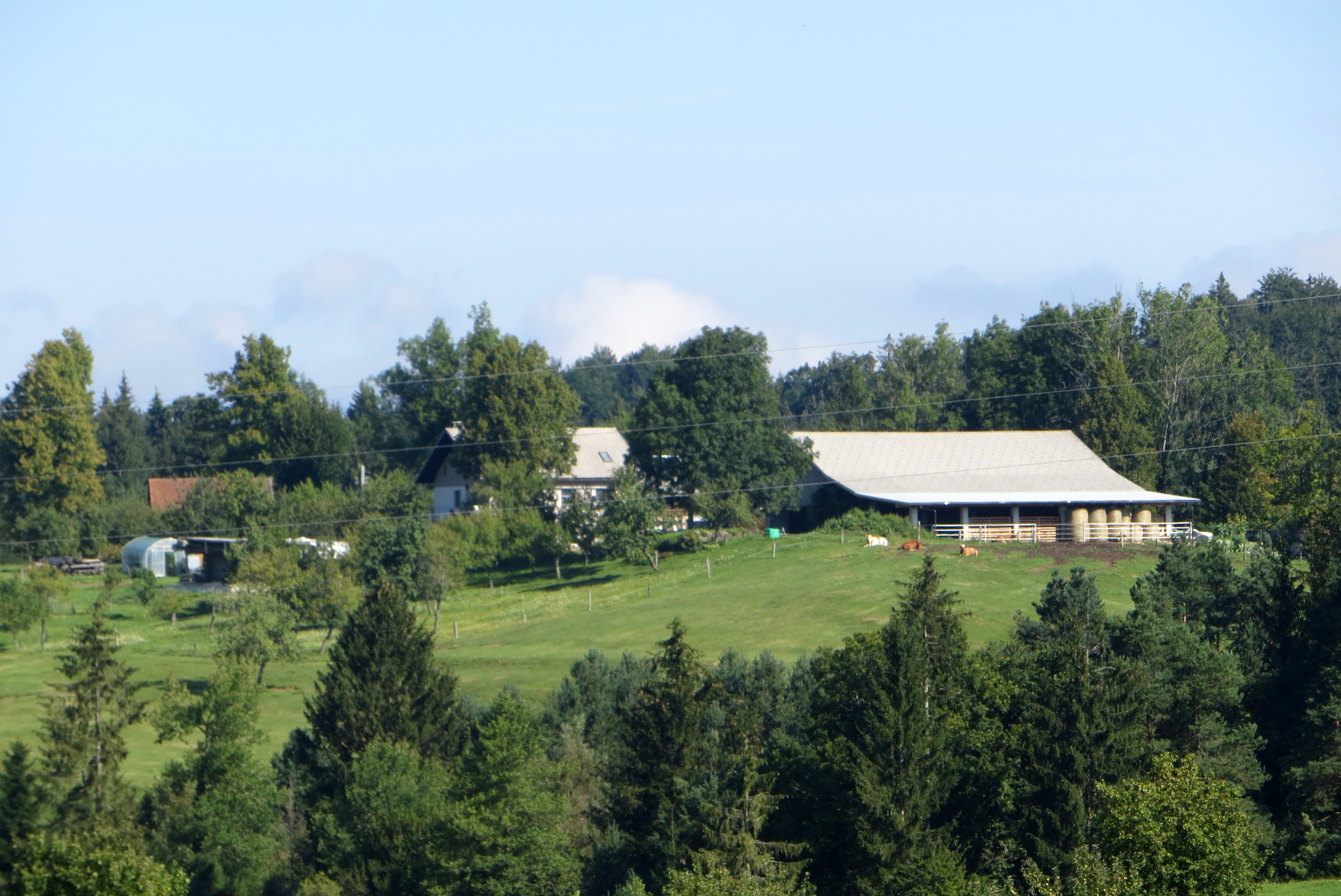

- Location in Slovenia
- Coordinates: 45°48′16.09″N 14°31′19.32″E
- Country: Slovenia
- Traditional region: Inner Carniola
- Statistical region: Littoral–Inner Carniola
- Municipality: Bloke

Area
  - Total: 0.27 km^{2} (0.10 sq mi)
- Elevation: 770.6 m (2,528 ft)

Population (2023)
  - Total: 3
  - Density: 11/km^{2} (29/sq mi)

Škufče (pronounced [ˈʃkuːftʃɛ]) is a small settlement east of the village of Ravnik in the Municipality of Bloke in the Inner Carniola region of Slovenia.
