= Veliki Vrh, Bloke =

Veliki Vrh
- Location in Slovenia
- Coordinates: 45°46′17.86″N 14°31′20.79″E
- Country: Slovenia
- Traditional region: Inner Carniola
- Statistical region: Littoral–Inner Carniola
- Municipality: Bloke

Area
  - Total: 3.2 km^{2} (1.2 sq mi)
- Elevation: 775 m (2,543 ft)

Population (2020)
  - Total: 47
  - Density: 15/km^{2} (38/sq mi)

Veliki Vrh (pronounced [ˈʋeːliki ˈʋəɾx], German: Großberg) is a small settlement east of Nova Vas in the Municipality of Bloke in the Inner Carniola region of Slovenia.

== Geography ==
Veliki Vrh includes the hamlet of Podveliki Vrh (German: Untergroßberg) south of the main part of the settlement.
