= Kramplje =

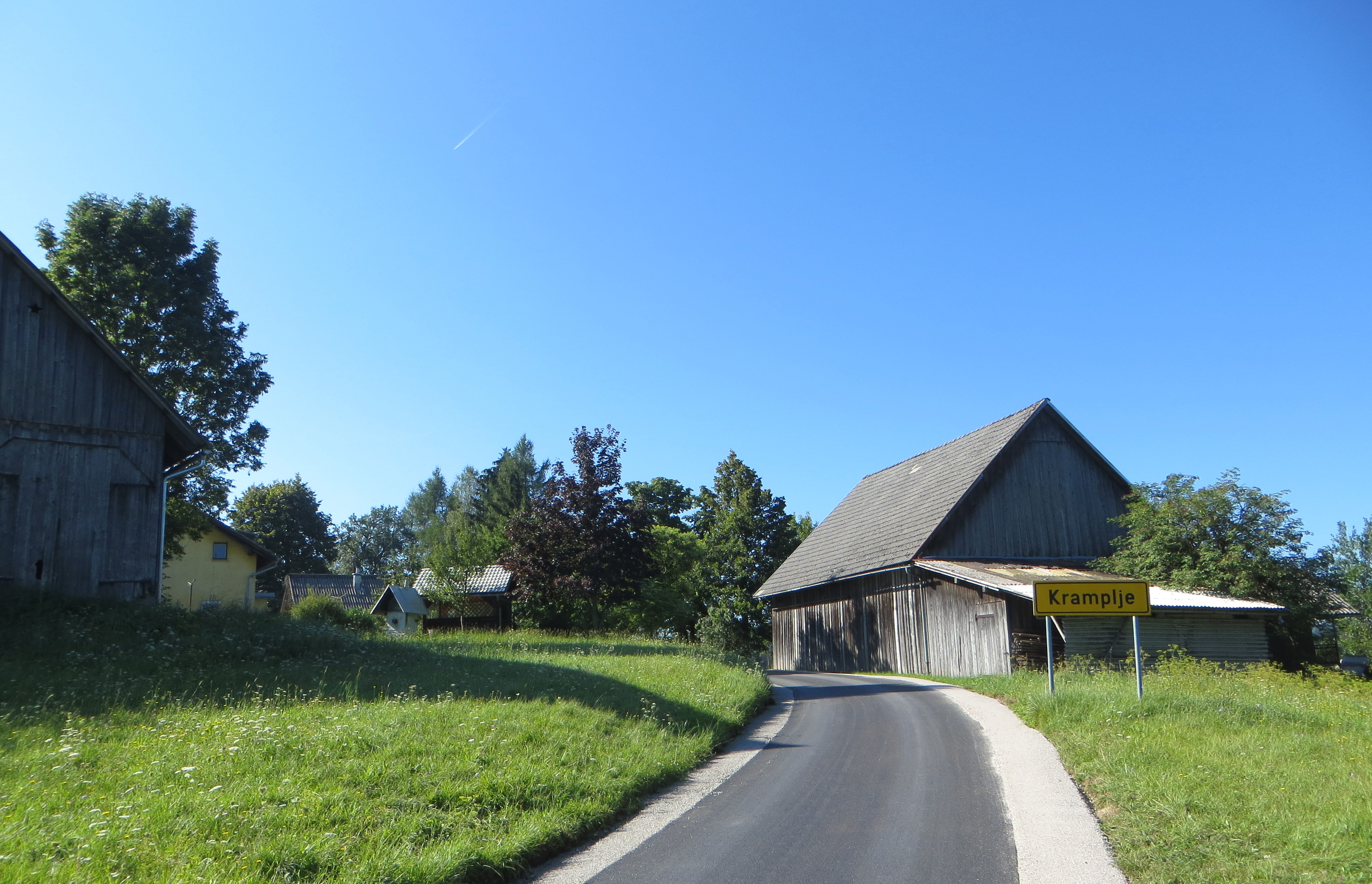

- Location in Slovenia
- Coordinates: 45°47′36.26″N 14°31′22.44″E
- Country: Slovenia
- Traditional region: Inner Carniola
- Statistical region: Littoral–Inner Carniola
- Municipality: Bloke
- Elevation: 753.6 m (2,472 ft)

Population (2020)
  - Total: 10

Kramplje (pronounced [ˈkɾaːmpljɛ]) is a small settlement north of Nova Vas in the Municipality of Bloke in the Inner Carniola region of Slovenia.
