= Metulje =

- Location in Slovenia
- Coordinates: 45°44′38.75″N 14°31′23.95″E
- Country: Slovenia
- Traditional region: Inner Carniola
- Statistical region: Littoral–Inner Carniola
- Municipality: Bloke

Area
  - Total: 4.91 km^{2} (1.90 sq mi)
- Elevation: 730.1 m (2,395 ft)

Population (2020)
  - Total: 55
  - Density: 11/km^{2} (29/sq mi)
- Time zone: GMT/UTC + 1 hour

Metulje (pronounced [mɛˈtuːljɛ]) is a small village south of Nova Vas in the Municipality of Bloke in the Inner Carniola region of Slovenia.

The local church in the settlement is dedicated to Saint Anthony of Padua and belongs to the Parish of Bloke.
