= Jeršanovo =

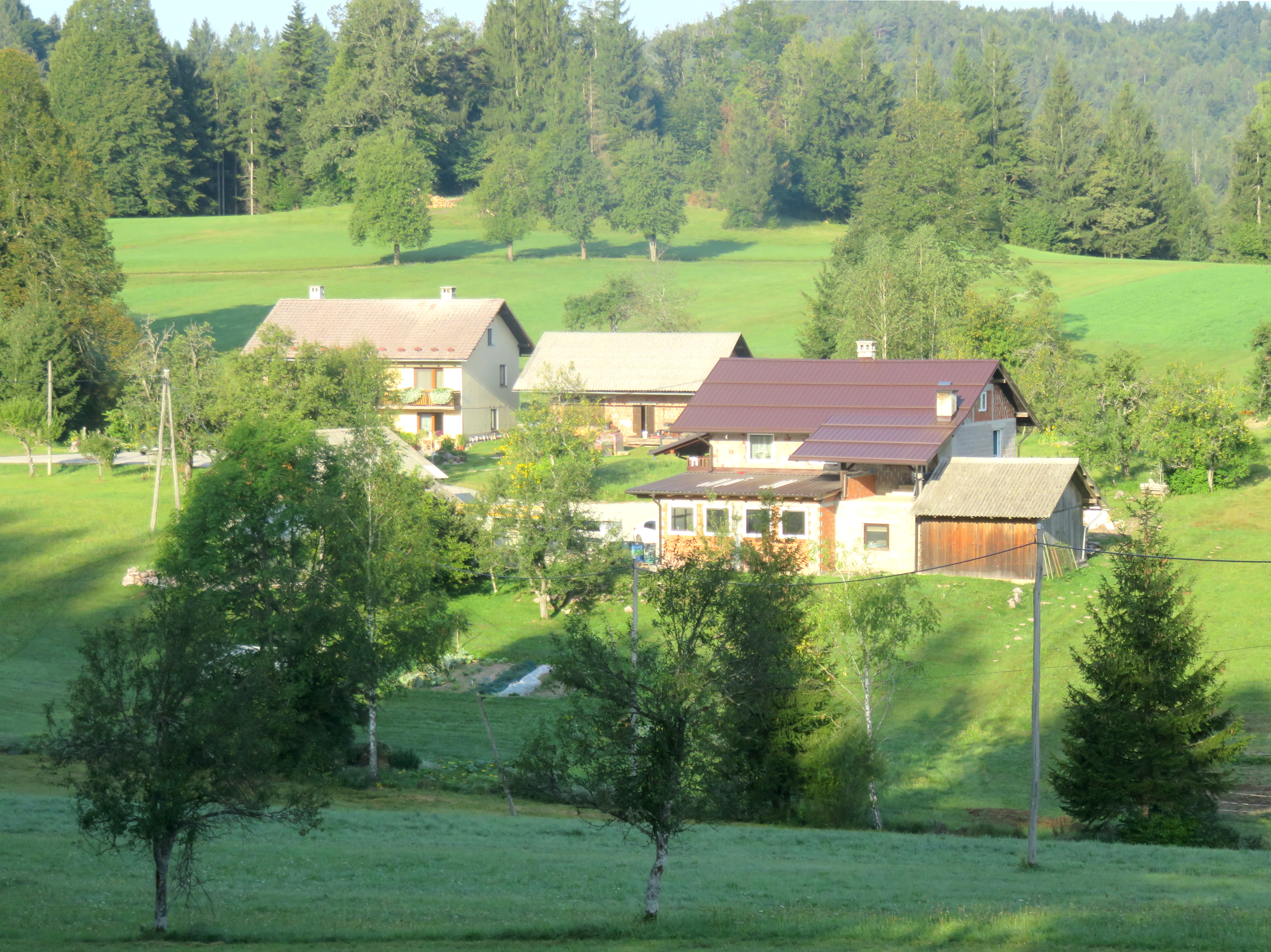

- Location in Slovenia
- Coordinates: 45°48′48.59″N 14°28′2.63″E
- Country: Slovenia
- Traditional region: Inner Carniola
- Statistical region: Littoral–Inner Carniola
- Municipality: Bloke

Area
  - Total: 0.45 km^{2} (0.17 sq mi)
- Elevation: 686.5 m (2,252 ft)

Population (2020)
  - Total: 21
  - Density: 47/km^{2} (120/sq mi)

Jeršanovo (pronounced [jɛɾˈʃaːnɔʋɔ]) is a small settlement north of Velike Bloke in the Municipality of Bloke in the Inner Carniola region of Slovenia. Ecclesiastically, it is located in the parish of Sveta Trojica nad Cerknico within the Archdiocese of Ljubljana.
