= Municipality of Bloke =

Municipality of Slovenia

Municipality of Bloke Občina Bloke
- Municipality
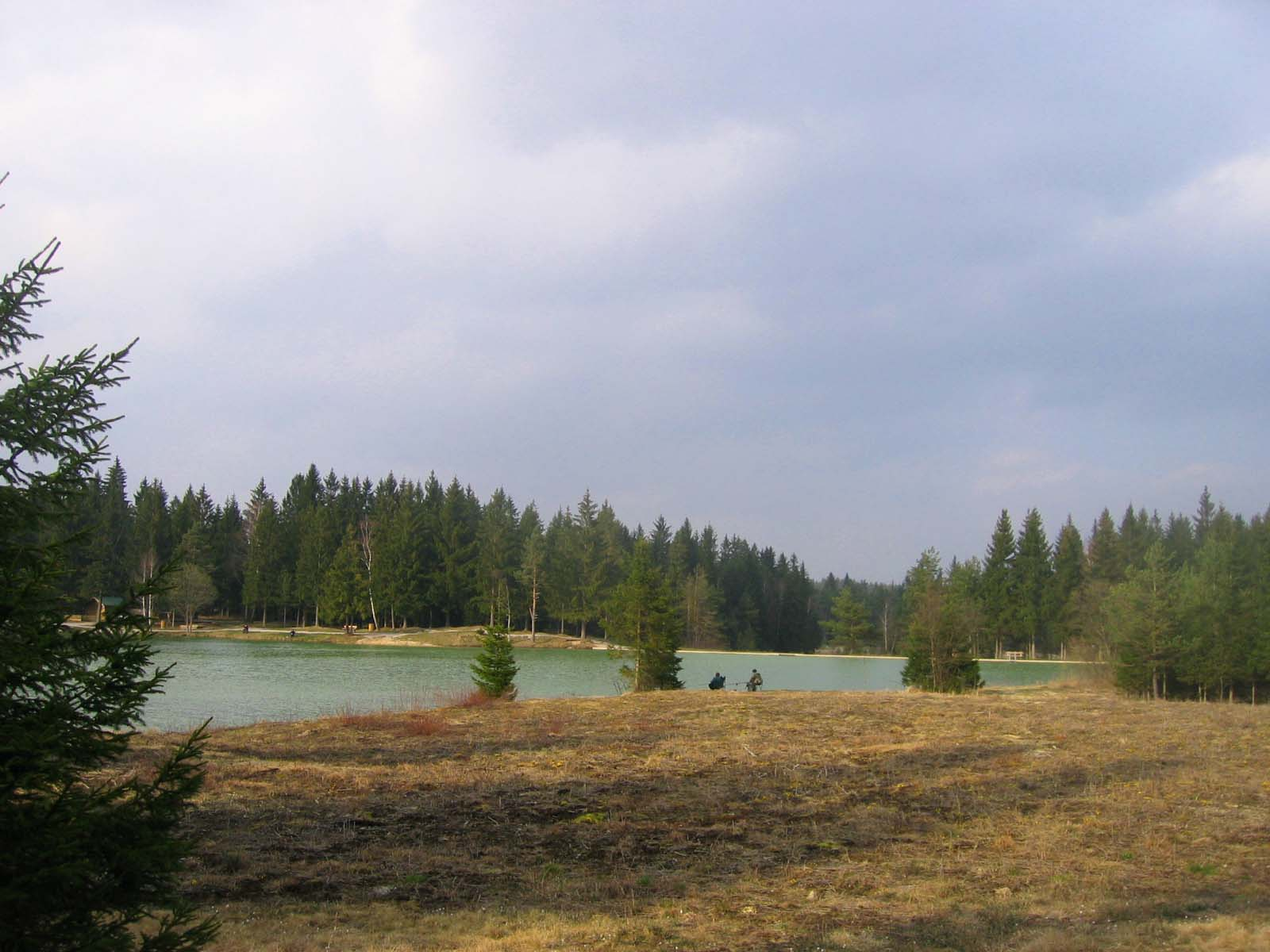
- Lake Bloke

- Flag

- Location of the Municipality of Bloke in Slovenia
- Coordinates: 45°47′N 14°29′E
- Country: Slovenia

Government
  - Mayor: Jože Doles (SLS)

Area
  - Total: 75.1 km^{2} (29.0 sq mi)
- Elevation: 750 m (2,460 ft)

Population (2002)
  - Total: 1,578
  - Density: 21.0/km^{2} (54.4/sq mi)
- Time zone: UTC+01 (CET)
  - Summer (DST): UTC+02 (CEST)
- Postal code: 1385
- Vehicle registration: LJ
- Website: www.bloke.si

The Municipality of Bloke (pronounced [ˈblòːkɛ, ˈblóːkɛ]; Slovene: Občina Bloke) is a municipality in Slovenia. Originally a municipality in its own right, it was incorporated into the Municipality of Cerknica in 1955 and it was included in the Municipality of Loška Dolina in 1994, when it split from Cerknica. It was re-established as an independent municipality in 1998.

== Etymology ==
The Municipality of Bloke is named after the karst Bloke Plateau, over which the majority of its 45 settlements are scattered. The name Bloke was first attested in written sources in 1230 as Oblach (and as Oblukch in 1260, Oblakh in 1360, and Obloc in 1581). These early attestations indicate that the name was originally *Obloke, probably derived from the prepositional phrase *ob(ь) lǫky or *ob(ь) lǫkaxъ 'next to the flood-meadow(s)'. Less likely theories connect the name to the meanings 'next to rough terrain' or 'arc, arch'.

== Settlements ==
In addition to the municipal seat of Nova Vas, the municipality also includes the following settlements:

- Andrejčje
- Benete
- Bočkovo
- Fara
- Glina
- Godičevo
- Gradiško
- Hiteno
- Hribarjevo
- Hudi Vrh
- Jeršanovo
- Kramplje
- Lahovo
- Lepi Vrh
- Lovranovo
- Malni
- Metulje
- Mramorovo pri Lužarjih
- Mramorovo pri Pajkovem
- Nemška Vas na Blokah
- Ograda
- Polšeče
- Radlek
- Ravne na Blokah
- Ravnik
- Rožanče
- Runarsko
- Škrabče
- Škufče
- Sleme
- Štorovo
- Strmca
- Studenec na Blokah
- Studeno na Blokah
- Sveta Trojica
- Sveti Duh
- Topol
- Ulaka
- Velike Bloke
- Veliki Vrh
- Volčje
- Zakraj
- Zales
- Zavrh

== Notable people ==
- Ivan Čampa, poet and writer (1914, Nemška Vas na Blokah – 1942, Sveti Vid)
- Jože Čampa, writer, postal clerk, researcher of rural life (1893, Benete – 1989, Ljubljana)
- Anton Drobnič, lawyer, attorney general, president of the New Slovenian Covenant (1928, Bloke – 2018, Ljubljana)
- Anton Hren, priest (1901, Verd – 1952, Nova Vas)
- Božidar Lavrič, Tito's doctor and Partisan (1899, Nova Vas – 1961, Ljubljana)
- Izidor Modic, linguist (1884, Lahovo – 1915, Renče)
- Josip Podbregar, railway official and musician (1880, Velike Bloke – 1948)
- Jernej Ponikvar, priest (1877, Velike Bloke – 1952, Cleveland)
- Ivan Prezelj, general in the Yugoslav Army in the Homeland and the Slovenian National Army (1895, Nova Vas – 1973, Cleveland)
- Josip Prezelj, linguist, translator (1894, Nova Vas – 1969, Ljubljana)
- Tone Šraj, nom de guerre Aljoša, Partisan (1912–1943)
- Ernest Tomec, politician and organizer (1885, Fara, Bloke – 1942, Ljubljana)
- Ivan Tomec, astronomer (1880, Fara, Bloke – 1950, Ljubljana)
- Louis Tomtz, born Alojz Tomc, priest (1903, Nova Vas – 1989, Cleveland)
- Janez Urbas, author of juvenile literature (1882, Volčje – 1903, Vavta Vas)
- Milena Usenik, athlete and painter (born 1934, Veliki Vrh)
- Iztok Winkler, forestry expert and politician (1939, Nova Vas – 2013)
- Miro Zakrajšek, journalist and editor (1921, Studenec na Blokah – 1981, Ljubljana)
- Miloš Zidanšek, political agitator, communist, Partisan, and People's Hero of Yugoslavia (1909, Straža na Gori pri Dramljah – 1942, Hribarjevo, Velike Bloke)
- Ivan Zidar, mechanical engineer and construction entrepreneur (born 1938, Škrabče)

== Gallery ==
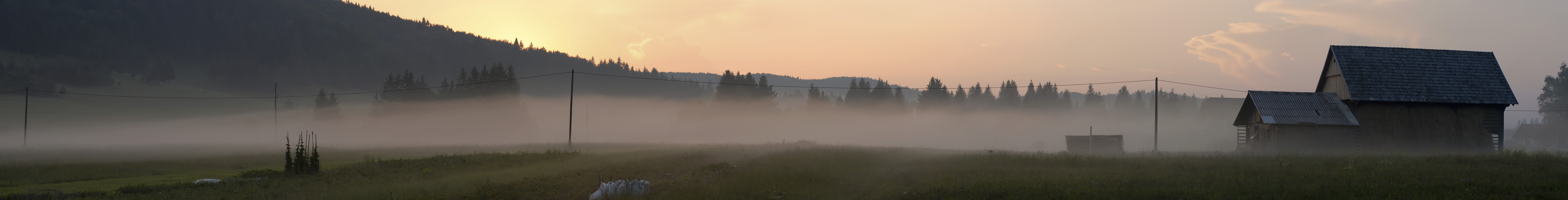
Panorama of the Bloke Plateau
