= Strmca, Bloke =

Strmca
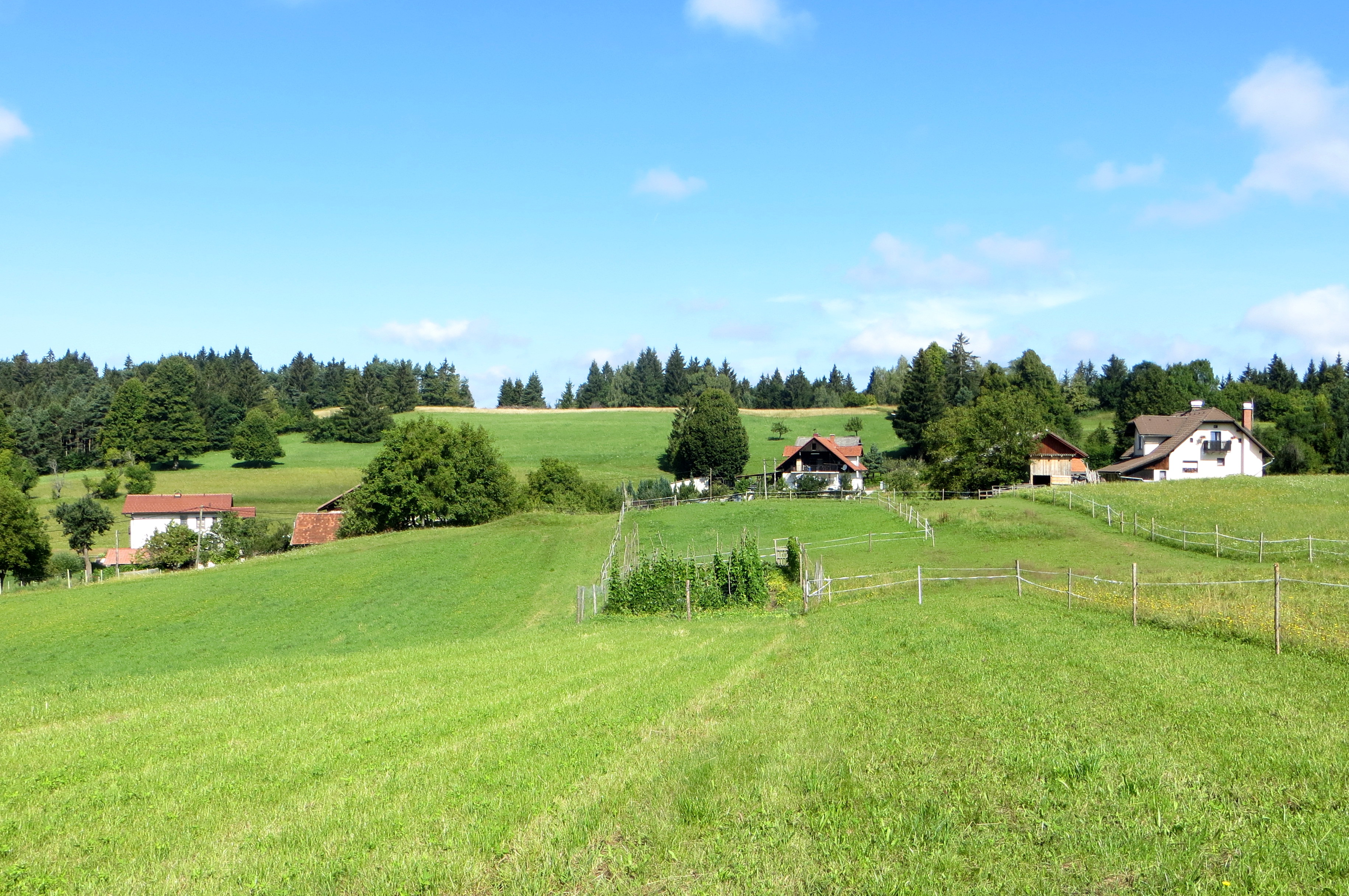

- Location in Slovenia
- Coordinates: 45°47′47″N 14°32′55″E
- Country: Slovenia
- Traditional region: Inner Carniola
- Statistical region: Littoral–Inner Carniola
- Municipality: Bloke

Area
  - Total: 0.65 km^{2} (0.25 sq mi)
- Elevation: 796.8 m (2,614 ft)

Population (2020)
  - Total: 25
  - Density: 38/km^{2} (100/sq mi)

Strmca (pronounced [ˈstəɾmtsa], in older sources Strmec, German: Stermez) is a small settlement northeast of Nova Vas in the Municipality of Bloke in the Inner Carniola region of Slovenia.
