= Mramorovo pri Pajkovem =

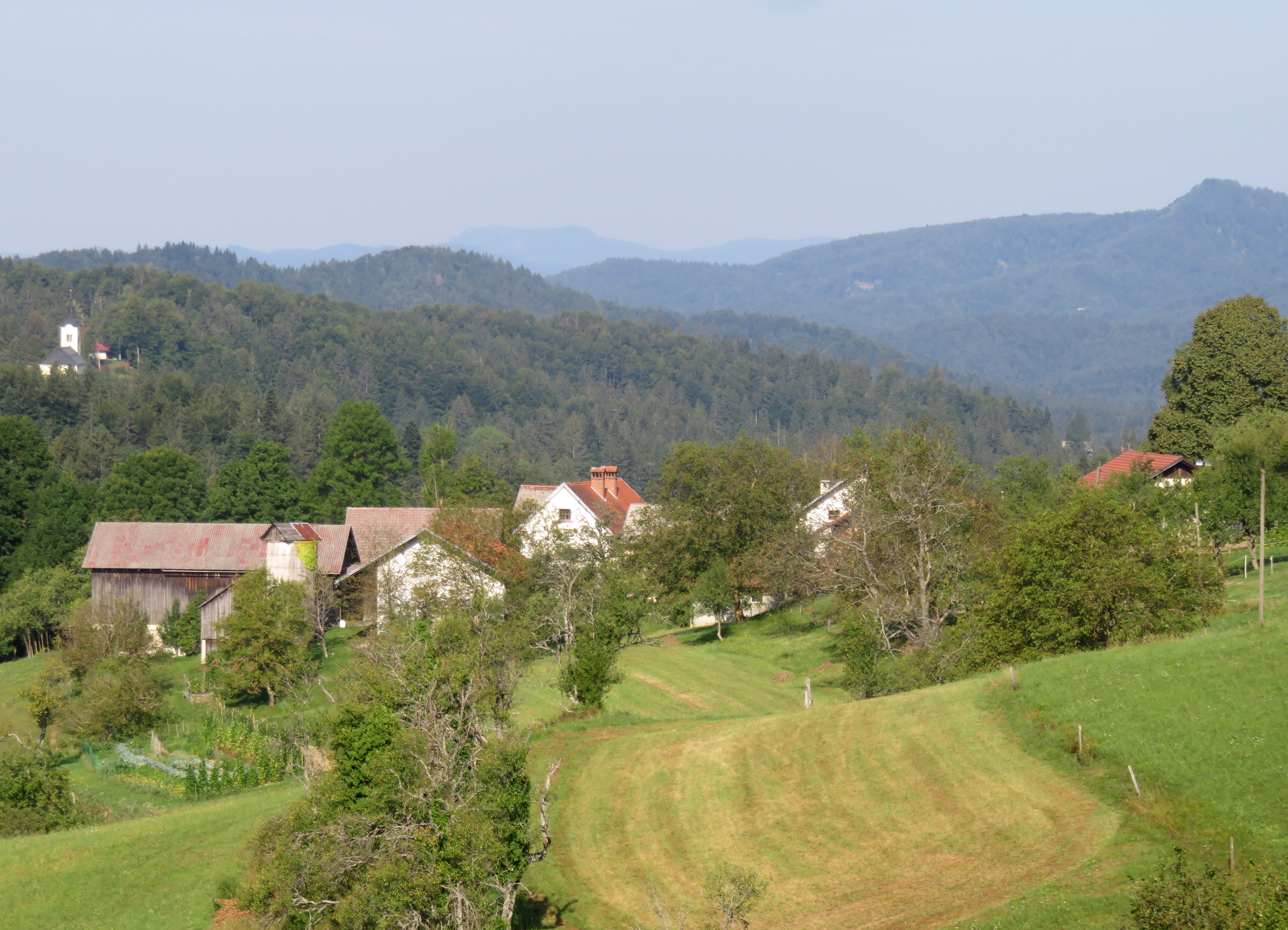

- Location in Slovenia
- Coordinates: 45°48′37.08″N 14°29′48.35″E
- Country: Slovenia
- Traditional region: Inner Carniola
- Statistical region: Littoral–Inner Carniola
- Municipality: Bloke
- Elevation: 741 m (2,431 ft)

Population (2020)
  - Total: 14

Mramorovo pri Pajkovem (pronounced [mɾaˈmoːɾɔʋɔ pɾi ˈpaːi̯kɔʋɛm]) is a small settlement northwest of Ravnik in the Municipality of Bloke in the Inner Carniola region of Slovenia.
