= Nemška Vas na Blokah =

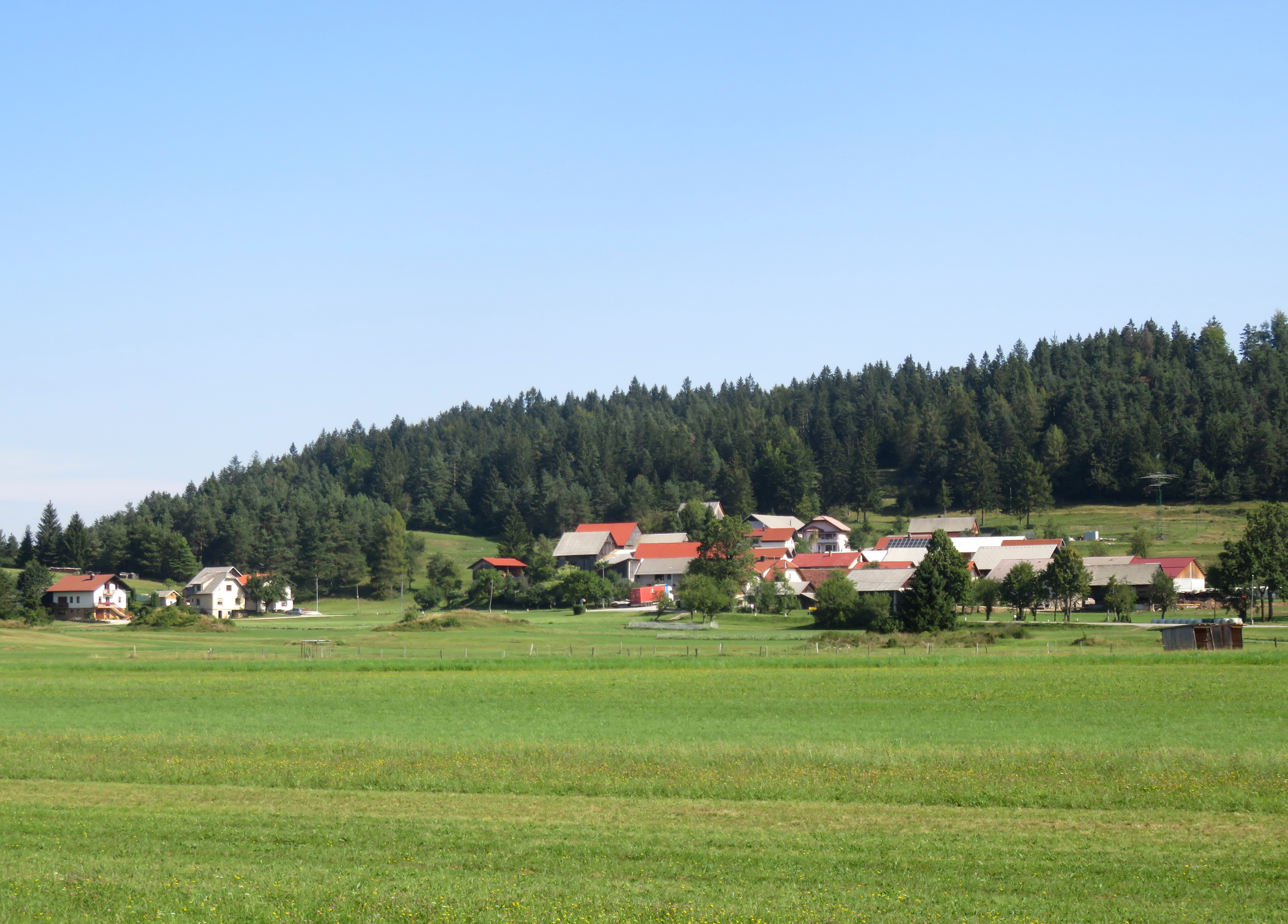

- Location in Slovenia
- Coordinates: 45°46′41.88″N 14°30′14.39″E
- Country: Slovenia
- Traditional region: Inner Carniola
- Statistical region: Littoral–Inner Carniola
- Municipality: Bloke

Area
  - Total: 1.45 km^{2} (0.56 sq mi)
- Elevation: 724.63 m (2,377.4 ft)

Population (2020)
  - Total: 30
  - Density: 21/km^{2} (54/sq mi)

Nemška Vas na Blokah (pronounced [ˈnéːmʃka ˈʋáːs na ˈblòːkax, - ˈblóː-]; German: Deutschdorf) is a small village immediately north of Nova Vas in the Municipality of Bloke in the Inner Carniola region of Slovenia.

== Name ==
Nemška Vas na Blokah was attested in historical sources as Theutstendorf in 1377 and Dewͤczendorff in 1427, among other spellings. The name of the settlement was changed from Nemška vas to Nemška vas na Blokah in 1953. Both the Slovene and German names of the village mean 'German village', referring to a settlement of ethnic Germans in what was otherwise Slovene ethnic territory.
