= List of cities, towns, and villages in Slovenia: Z =

This is a list of cities, towns, and villages in Slovenia, starting with Z.

Settlement	Municipality
Za Kalvarijo	Maribor
Zabava	Zagorje ob Savi
Zabavlje	Koper
Zabiče	Ilirska Bistrica
Zabočevo	Borovnica
Zabork	Zreče
Zaboršt pri Dolu	Dol pri Ljubljani
Zaboršt pri Šentvidu	Ivančna Gorica
Zaboršt	Domžale
Zaboršt	Krško
Zaboršt	Škocjan
Zabovci	Markovci
Zabrdje	Trebnje
Zabrdo	Železniki
Zabrekve	Železniki
Zabreznica	Žirovnica
Zabreznik	Zagorje ob Savi
Zabrež	Laško
Zabrežnik	Žiri
Zabukovica	Žalec
Zabukovje nad Sevnico	Sevnica
Zabukovje pri Raki	Krško
Zabukovje	Kranj
Zabukovje	Trebnje
Zabukovje	Vojnik
Začret	Celje
Zadlaz-Čadrg	Tolmin
Zadlaz-Žabče	Tolmin
Zadlog	Idrija
Zadniki	Ribnica
Zadnja vas	Radovljica
Zadobje	Gorenja vas-Poljane
Zadobrova	Celje
Zadolje	Ribnica
Zadraga	Naklo
Zadrže	Šmarje pri Jelšah
Zafara	Žužemberk
Zagaj pod Bočem	Rogaška Slatina
Zagaj pri Ponikvi	Šentjur
Zagaj	Bistrica ob Sotli
Zagajski Vrh	Gornja Radgona
Zagojiči	Gorišnica
Zagon	Postojna
Zagorci	Juršinci
Zagorica nad Kamnikom	Kamnik
Zagorica pri Čatežu	Trebnje
Zagorica pri Dobrniču	Trebnje
Zagorica pri Dolskem	Dol pri Ljubljani
Zagorica pri Rovah	Domžale
Zagorica pri Velikem Gabru	Trebnje
Zagorica	Dobrepolje
Zagorica	Litija
Zagorica	Mirna
Zagorje ob Savi	Zagorje ob Savi
Zagorje	Kozje
Zagorje	Ormož
Zagorje	Pivka
Zagozd	Litija
Zagozdac	Črnomelj
Zagrad pri Otočcu	Novo mesto
Zagrad	Prevalje
Zagrad	Radeče
Zagrad	Škocjan
Zagradec pri Grosupljem	Grosuplje
Zagradec	Ivančna Gorica
Zagradišče	Ljubljana
Zagrajec	Komen
Zagrič	Litija
Zahomce	Vransko
Zahrib	Cerknica
Zajasovnik - del	Kamnik
Zajasovnik - del	Vransko
Zajčje Polje	Kočevje
Zajčji Vrh pri Stopičah	Novo mesto
Zajčji Vrh	Črnomelj
Zajelše	Dol pri Ljubljani
Zajelšje	Ilirska Bistrica
Zakal	Kamnik
Zakl	Braslovče
Zakl	Podlehnik
Zaklanec	Horjul
Zakobiljek	Gorenja vas-Poljane
Zakojca	Cerkno
Zakraj	Bloke
Zakraj	Tolmin
Zakriž	Cerkno
Zala	Cerknica
Zala	Železniki
Zales	Bloke
Zali Breg	Brda
Zali Log	Železniki
Zalisec	Žužemberk
Zalog pod Sv. Trojico	Domžale
Zalog pod Uršulo	Šentjur
Zalog pri Cerkljah	Cerklje na Gorenjskem
Zalog pri Kresnicah	Moravče
Zalog pri Moravčah	Moravče
Zalog pri Šempetru	Žalec
Zalog pri Škocjanu	Škocjan
Zalog pri Škofljici	Škofljica
Zalog	Kranj
Zalog	Novo mesto
Zaloka	Trebnje
Zaloke	Krško
Zalošče	Nova Gorica
Zaloše	Radovljica
Zaloška Gorica	Žalec
Založe	Polzela
Zamarkova	Lenart
Zameško	Šentjernej
Zamostec	Sodražica
Zamušani	Gorišnica
Zanigrad	Koper
Zaplana - del	Logatec
Zaplana - del	Vrhnika
Zaplanina	Vransko
Zapodje	Litija
Zapoge	Vodice
Zapotok	Ig
Zapotok	Kanal
Zapotok	Sodražica
Zapreval	Gorenja vas-Poljane
Zapudje	Črnomelj
Zapuže pri Kostelu	Kostel
Zapuže pri Ribnici	Ribnica
Zapuže	Radovljica
Zapuže	Šentjernej
Zarečica	Ilirska Bistrica
Zarečje	Ilirska Bistrica
Zasadi	Destrnik
Zasadi	Križevci
Zasap	Brežice
Zasavci	Ormož
Zasip	Bled
Zastava	Črnomelj
Zastranje	Šmarje pri Jelšah
Zatolmin	Tolmin
Zavine	Zagorje ob Savi
Zavinek	Škocjan
Zavino	Ajdovščina
Zavodice	Nazarje
Zavodnje	Šoštanj
Zavrate	Radeče
Zavratec	Idrija
Zavratec	Sevnica
Zavrč	Zavrč
Zavrh nad Dobrno	Dobrna
Zavrh pod Šmarno Goro	Medvode
Zavrh pri Borovnici	Vrhnika
Zavrh pri Črnivcu	Kamnik
Zavrh pri Galiciji	Žalec
Zavrh pri Trojanah	Lukovica
Zavrh	Bloke
Zavrh	Lenart
Zavrh	Litija
Zavrh	Trebnje
Zavrhek	Divača
Zavrstnik	Litija
Završe pri Dobjem	Dobje
Završe pri Grobelnem	Šmarje pri Jelšah
Završe	Mislinja
Završje	Trbovlje
Zavrtače	Ivančna Gorica
Zazid	Koper
Zbelovo	Slovenske Konjice
Zbelovska Gora	Slovenske Konjice
Zbigovci	Gornja Radgona
Zbilje	Medvode
Zbure	Novo mesto
Zdenska vas	Dobrepolje
Zdihovo	Kočevje
Zdole	Kozje
Zdole	Krško
Zduša	Kamnik
Zeče pri Bučah	Kozje
Zeče	Slovenske Konjice
Zelen Breg	Ravne na Koroškem
Zelše	Cerknica
Zemelj	Metlika
Zemono	Vipava
Zenkovci	Puconci
Zglavnica	Litija
Zgonče	Velike Lašče
Zgornja Bačkova	Sveta Ana
Zgornja Bela	Preddvor
Zgornja Besnica	Kranj
Zgornja Besnica	Ljubljana
Zgornja Bistrica	Slovenska Bistrica
Zgornja Brežnica	Slovenska Bistrica
Zgornja Dobrava	Moravče
Zgornja Dobrava	Radovljica
Zgornja Draga	Ivančna Gorica
Zgornja Gorica	Rače-Fram
Zgornja Hajdina	Hajdina
Zgornja Jablanica	Litija
Zgornja Javoršica	Moravče
Zgornja Jevnica	Litija
Zgornja Kapla	Podvelka
Zgornja Korena	Duplek
Zgornja Kostrivnica	Rogaška Slatina
Zgornja Kungota	Kungota
Zgornja Lipnica	Radovljica
Zgornja Ložnica	Slovenska Bistrica
Zgornja Luša	Škofja Loka
Zgornja Nova vas	Slovenska Bistrica
Zgornja Orlica	Ribnica na Pohorju
Zgornja Pohanca	Brežice
Zgornja Polskava	Slovenska Bistrica
Zgornja Pristava	Slovenske Konjice
Zgornja Pristava	Videm
Zgornja Radovna	Kranjska Gora
Zgornja Rečica	Laško
Zgornja Ročica	Sveta Ana
Zgornja Selnica	Selnica ob Dravi
Zgornja Senarska	Lenart
Zgornja Senica	Medvode
Zgornja Slivnica	Grosuplje
Zgornja Sorica	Železniki
Zgornja Sveča	Majšperk
Zgornja Ščavnica	Sveta Ana
Zgornja Velka	Šentilj
Zgornja Vižinga	Radlje ob Dravi
Zgornja Voličina	Lenart
Zgornje Bitnje	Kranj
Zgornje Danje	Železniki
Zgornje Dobrenje	Šentilj
Zgornje Duplice	Grosuplje
Zgornje Duplje	Naklo
Zgornje Gameljne	Ljubljana
Zgornje Gorče	Braslovče
Zgornje Gorje	Bled
Zgornje Gradišče	Šentilj
Zgornje Gruškovje	Podlehnik
Zgornje Grušovje	Oplotnica
Zgornje Grušovlje	Žalec
Zgornje Hlapje	Pesnica
Zgornje Hoče	Hoče-Slivnica
Zgornje Jablane	Kidričevo
Zgornje Jarše	Domžale
Zgornje Jezersko	Jezersko
Zgornje Konjišče	Gornja Radgona
Zgornje Koseze	Moravče
Zgornje Laze	Bled
Zgornje Laže	Slovenske Konjice
Zgornje Loke	Lukovica
Zgornje Mladetiče	Sevnica
Zgornje Negonje	Rogaška Slatina
Zgornje Palovče	Kamnik
Zgornje Partinje	Lenart
Zgornje Pirniče	Medvode
Zgornje Pobrežje	Mozirje
Zgornje Poljčane	Slovenska Bistrica
Zgornje Prapreče	Lukovica
Zgornje Prebukovje	Slovenska Bistrica
Zgornje Roje	Žalec
Zgornje Sečovo	Rogaška Slatina
Zgornje Selce	Šentjur
Zgornje Slemene	Šentjur
Zgornje Stranje	Kamnik
Zgornje Škofije	Koper
Zgornje Tinsko	Šmarje pri Jelšah
Zgornje Verjane	Lenart
Zgornje Vetrno	Tržič
Zgornje Vodale	Sevnica
Zgornje Vrtiče	Kungota
Zgornji Boč	Selnica ob Dravi
Zgornji Brnik	Cerklje na Gorenjskem
Zgornji Čačič	Osilnica
Zgornji Duplek	Duplek
Zgornji Gabrnik	Rogaška Slatina
Zgornji Gasteraj	Lenart
Zgornji Hotič	Litija
Zgornji Jakobski Dol	Pesnica
Zgornji Janževski Vrh	Ribnica na Pohorju
Zgornji Kamenščak	Ljutomer
Zgornji Kocjan	Radenci
Zgornji Kozji Vrh	Radlje ob Dravi
Zgornji Lehen na Pohorju	Ribnica na Pohorju
Zgornji Leskovec	Videm
Zgornji Log	Litija
Zgornji Motnik	Kamnik
Zgornji Obrež	Brežice
Zgornji Otok	Radovljica
Zgornji Petelinjek	Lukovica
Zgornji Porčič	Lenart
Zgornji Prekar	Moravče
Zgornji Prhovec	Zagorje ob Savi
Zgornji Razbor	Slovenj Gradec
Zgornji Slemen - del	Maribor
Zgornji Slemen - del	Selnica ob Dravi
Zgornji Tuhinj	Kamnik
Zgornji Tuštanj	Moravče
Zgornji Velovlek	Destrnik
Zgornji Žerjavci	Lenart
Zgoša	Radovljica
Zibika	Šmarje pri Jelšah
Zibiška vas	Šmarje pri Jelšah
Zibovnik	Cerknica
Zidani Most	Laško
Zidani Most	Trebnje
Zilje	Črnomelj
Zimica	Duplek
Zlakova	Zreče
Zlateče pri Šentjurju	Šentjur
Zlateče	Vojnik
Zlatenek	Lukovica
Zlati Rep	Ribnica
Zlato Polje	Lukovica
Zlatoličje	Starše
Zloganje	Škocjan
Zlogona Gora	Oplotnica
Zlogona vas	Oplotnica
Zminec	Škofja Loka
Znojile pri Krki	Ivančna Gorica
Znojile pri Studencu	Sevnica
Znojile	Kamnik
Znojile	Tolmin
Znojile	Zagorje ob Savi
Zorenci	Črnomelj
Zreče	Zreče
Zrkovci	Maribor
Zvirče	Tržič
Zvodno	Celje
