= Zavrh =

Zavrh may refer to:

== Slovenia ==
- Zavrh, Bloke, a village in Inner Carniola
- Zavrh, Lenart, a village in Styria
- Zavrh, Litija, a village in Lower Carniola
- Zavrh, Trebnje, a village in Lower Carniola
- Zavrh nad Dobrno, a village in Styria
- Zavrh pod Šmarno Goro, a village in Medvode, Upper Carniola
- Zavrh pri Borovnici, a village in Vrhnika, Inner Carniola
- Zavrh pri Galiciji, a village in Žalec, Styria
- Zavrh pri Trojanah or Za Vrhom, a village in Lukovica, Upper Carniola
- Zavrh pri Črnivcu, a village in Kamnik, Upper Carniola
- Zavrh Mass Grave, a cemetery for German soldiers near Podbeže, Inner Carniola

== Croatia ==
- Zavrh, Croatia, a village near Brod Moravice
