= Groblje =

Groblje may refer to:

In Serbia:

- Novo groblje, Belgrade, a cemetery complex
- Staro Groblje, a neighborhood of Niš

In Slovenia:

- Groblje, a hamlet of Buče, Kozje in the Municipality of Kozje
- Groblje, a hamlet of Dekmanca in the Municipality of Bistrica ob Sotli
- Groblje, a hamlet of Rodica, Domžale in the Municipality of Domžale
- Groblje pri Prekopi, a settlement in the Municipality of Šentjernej
