= Drensko Rebro =

- Location in Slovenia
- Coordinates: 46°6′31.89″N 15°32′12.66″E
- Country: Slovenia
- Traditional region: Styria
- Statistical region: Savinja
- Municipality: Kozje

Area
  - Total: 3.16 km^{2} (1.22 sq mi)
- Elevation: 438 m (1,437 ft)

Population (2002)
  - Total: 173

Drensko Rebro (pronounced [ˈdɾeːnskɔ ˈɾɛːbɾɔ]) is a settlement in the Municipality of Kozje in eastern Slovenia. It lies in the hills northeast of Lesično. The area is part of the historical Styria region. The municipality is now included in the Savinja Statistical Region.

== Mass graves ==
Drensko Rebro is the site of two known mass graves from the end of the Second World War. They both contain the remains of Croatians that were disarmed and murdered in May 1945 along the road to Virštanj and at the crossroads between Drensko Rebro and Lesično. The House No. 8a Mass Grave (Slovene: Grobišče pri hiši 8a) is located 700 meters (2,300 ft) north of Pilštanj, between a roadside ditch and a slope. The Sušica Creek Mass Grave (Grobišče ob potoku Sušica) is located in a meadow between Sušica Creek and the road to Pilštanj, between electric poles numbered 41 and 42.
