= Znojile =

Znojile may refer to several settlements in Slovenia:

- Znojile, Kamnik, a settlement in the Municipality of Kamnik
- Znojile pri Čepljah, a former settlement in the Municipality of Lukovica
- Znojile pri Krki, a settlement in the Municipality of Ivančna Gorica
- Znojile pri Studencu, a settlement in the Municipality of Sevnica
- Znojile, Tolmin, a settlement in the Municipality of Tolmin
- Znojile, Zagorje ob Savi, a settlement in the Municipality of Zagorje ob Savi
