= Topolovo =

- Location in Slovenia
- Coordinates: 46°6′18.13″N 15°29′11.84″E
- Country: Slovenia
- Traditional region: Styria
- Statistical region: Savinja
- Municipality: Kozje

Area
  - Total: 1.39 km^{2} (0.54 sq mi)
- Elevation: 436.9 m (1,433 ft)

Population (2002)
  - Total: 45

Topolovo (pronounced [tɔpɔˈlɔːʋɔ] or [tɔpɔˈloːʋɔ]) is a dispersed settlement in the Municipality of Kozje in eastern Slovenia. It lies in the Sava Hills (Slovene: Posavsko hribovje), west of Lesično. The area is part of the historical Styria region and is included in the Savinja Statistical Region.
