= Vojsko =

Vojsko may refer to several villages in Slovenia:

- Vojsko, Idrija
- Vojsko, Kozje
- Vojsko, Vodice
