= Klake, Kozje =

Klake
- Location in Slovenia
- Coordinates: 46°7′8.57″N 15°30′45.91″E
- Country: Slovenia
- Traditional region: Styria
- Statistical region: Savinja
- Municipality: Kozje

Area
  - Total: 1.15 km^{2} (0.44 sq mi)
- Elevation: 428.1 m (1,405 ft)

Population (2002)
  - Total: 179

Klake (pronounced [ˈklaːkɛ]) is a small dispersed settlement in the Municipality of Kozje in eastern Slovenia. It lies in the hills east of Pilštanj. The area is part of the historical Styria region. The municipality is included in the Savinja Statistical Region.

== Name ==
The name Klake is derived from the Slovene common noun tlaka through dissimilation (tl- > kl-). The term tlaka originally referred to voluntary collective labor, and later to corvée under feudalism. The name refers to a place where collective labor was performed. Because places with this name generally do not lie near old Roman roads, the suggestion that the name is derived from tlak 'pavement' is unlikely.
