= Gradišče, Kozje =

Gradišče
- Location in Slovenia
- Coordinates: 46°3′32.7″N 15°35′42.15″E
- Country: Slovenia
- Traditional region: Styria
- Statistical region: Savinja
- Municipality: Kozje

Area
  - Total: 2.54 km^{2} (0.98 sq mi)
- Elevation: 390 m (1,280 ft)

Population (2002)
  - Total: 53

Gradišče (pronounced [ɡɾaˈdiːʃtʃɛ]) is a settlement above Podsreda in the Municipality of Kozje in eastern Slovenia. The area is part of the historical Lower Styria region. The municipality is now included in the Savinja Statistical Region.

The local church, built on a hill south of the settlement known as Old Holy Mount (Slovene: Stara sveta gora), is dedicated to Mary of the Seven Sorrows and belongs to the Parish of Podsreda. It dates to the first half of the 14th century. A series of thirteen chapels representing Calvary and the Stations of the Cross was built along the path leading up the hill to the church in 1834.
