= Ortnice =

- Location in Slovenia
- Coordinates: 46°6′42.93″N 15°33′13.77″E
- Country: Slovenia
- Traditional region: Styria
- Statistical region: Savinja
- Municipality: Kozje

Area
  - Total: 0.84 km^{2} (0.32 sq mi)
- Elevation: 290.2 m (952 ft)

Population (2002)
  - Total: 25

Ortnice (pronounced [ˈoːɾtnitsɛ]) is a small settlement west of Buče in the Municipality of Kozje in eastern Slovenia. The Kozje area is part of the historical Styria region and is included in the Savinja Statistical Region.
