= Hiteno =

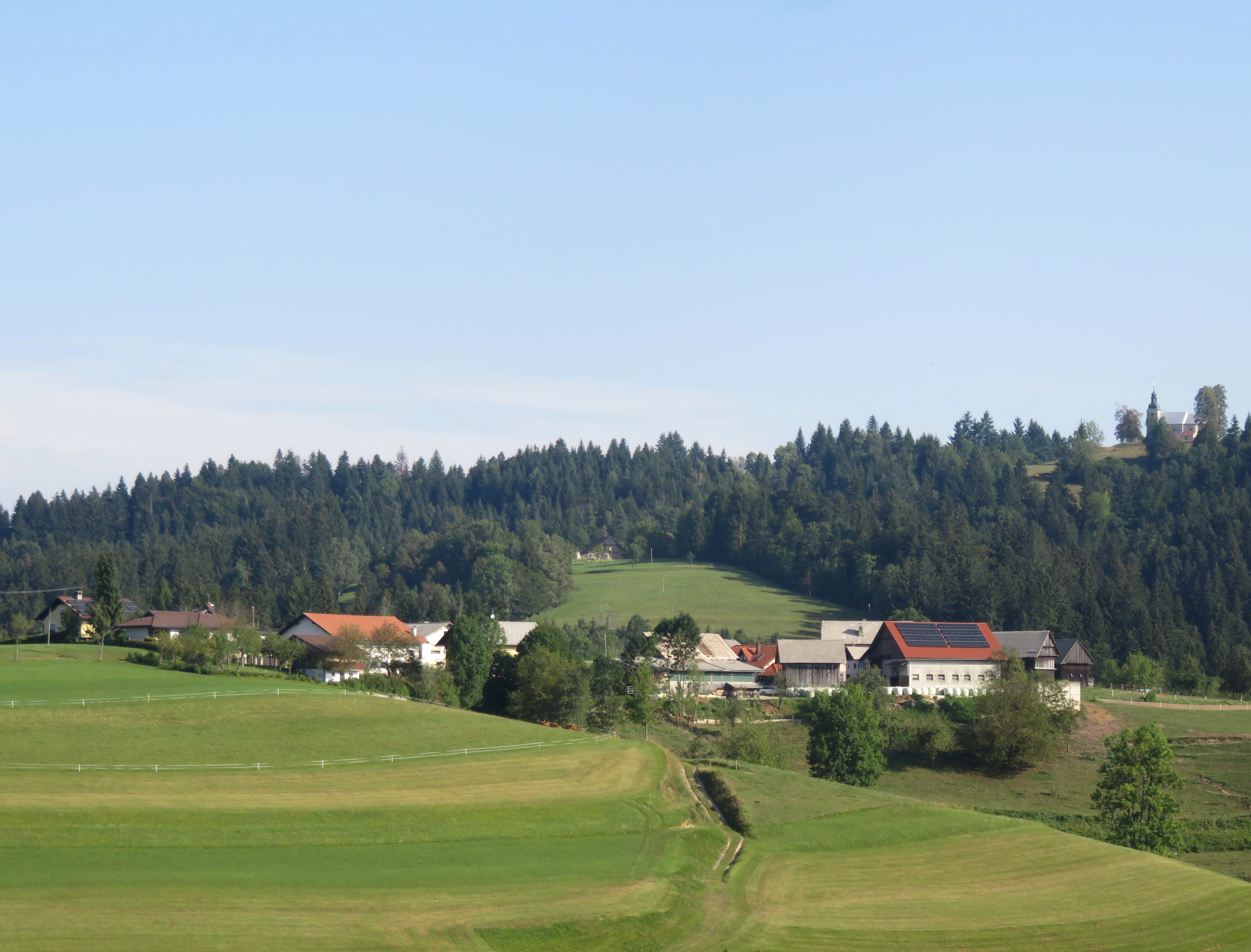

- Location in Slovenia
- Coordinates: 45°49′4.26″N 14°29′39.77″E
- Country: Slovenia
- Traditional region: Inner Carniola
- Statistical region: Littoral–Inner Carniola
- Municipality: Bloke

Area
  - Total: 1.5 km^{2} (0.58 sq mi)
- Elevation: 741.1 m (2,431 ft)

Population (2020)
  - Total: 18
  - Density: 12/km^{2} (31/sq mi)

Hiteno (pronounced [xiˈteːnɔ]) is a small settlement north of Nova Vas in the Municipality of Bloke in the Inner Carniola region of Slovenia.

== Church ==
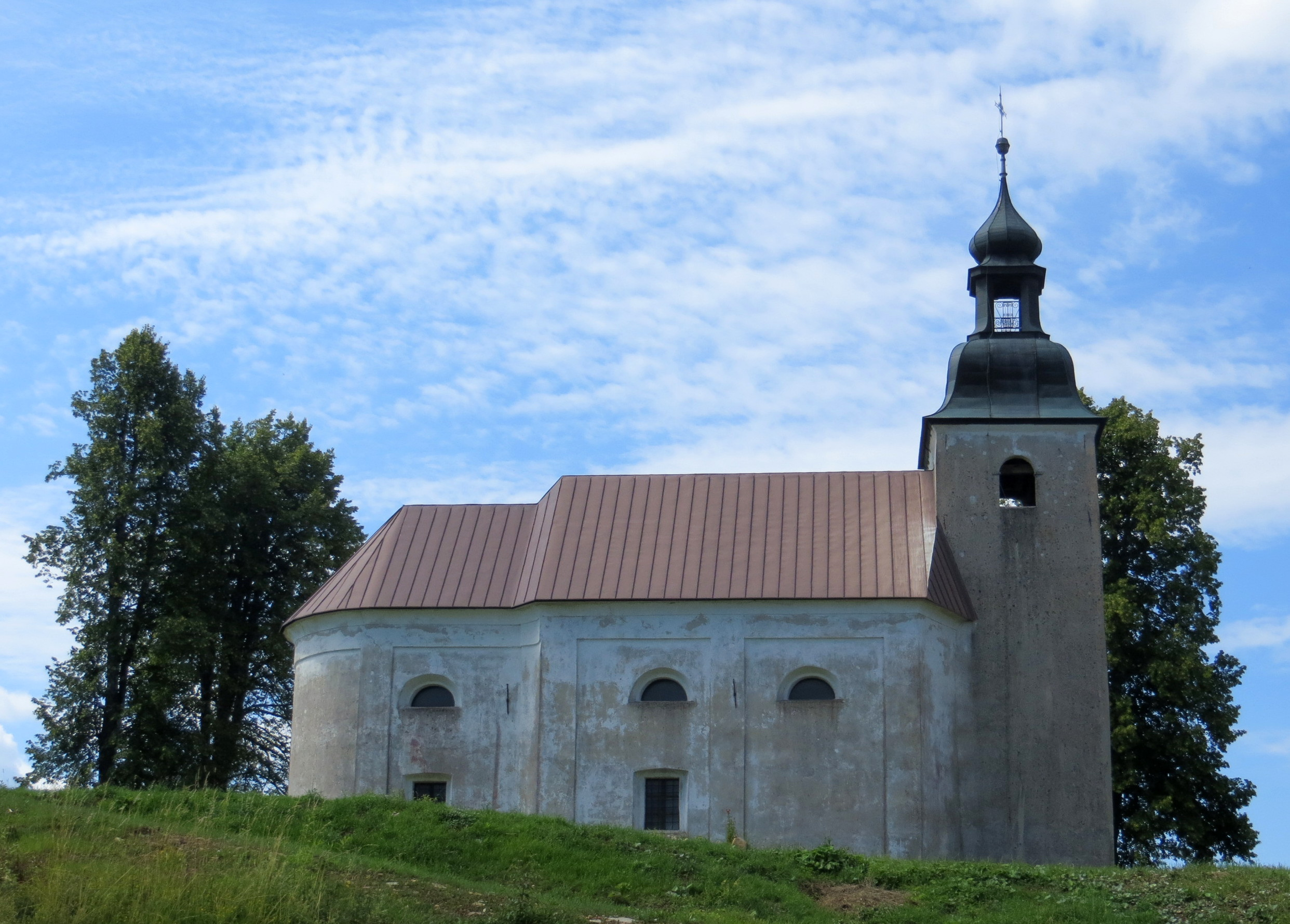
Saint Ulrich's Church

The local church, located closer to the settlement of Zavrh, and known locally as the Tabor by Zavrh church, is dedicated to Saint Ulrich and belongs to the Parish of Sveta Trojica nad Cerknico.

== Nadlišek Castle ==
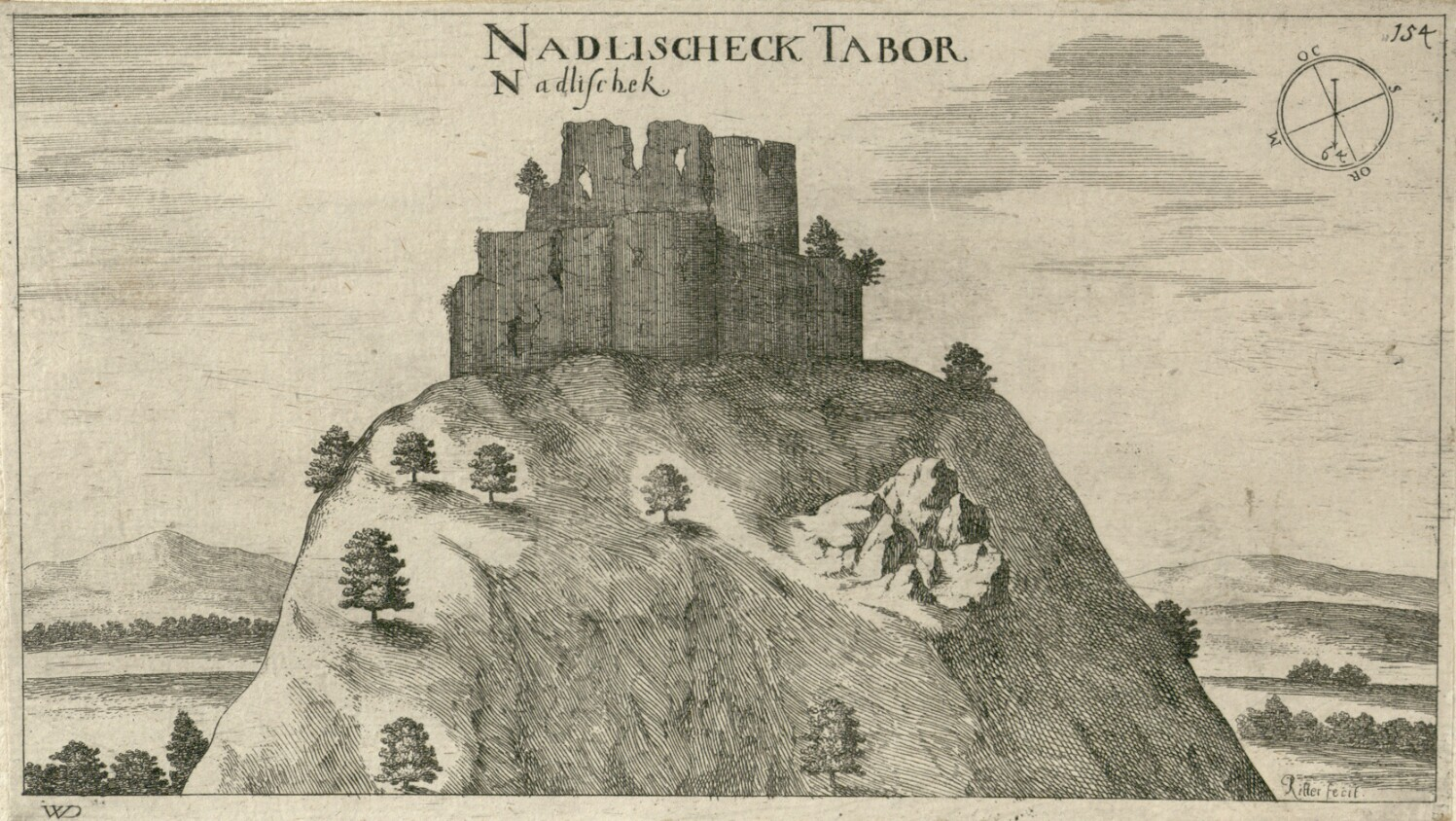
Nadlischeck Castle in the 17th century

Saint Ulrich's church stands on the remains of medieval Nadlischeck (Nadlišek) Castle. The castle was abandoned by the late 17th century, when its owners, the Auersperg counts of Turjak Castle, built a small manor house on a ridge above Hiteno. The manor house, New Nadlischeck, was used as a hunting lodge. It was burned in 1942 by the Royal Italian Army.
