= Bistrica, Kozje =

Bistrica
- Location in Slovenia
- Coordinates: 46°6′33.14″N 15°28′45.89″E
- Country: Slovenia
- Traditional region: Styria
- Statistical region: Savinja
- Municipality: Kozje

Area
  - Total: 2.36 km^{2} (0.91 sq mi)
- Elevation: 341.9 m (1,122 ft)

Population (2002)
  - Total: 56

Bistrica (pronounced [ˈbiːstɾitsa]) is a settlement in the Municipality of Kozje in eastern Slovenia. It lies in the Sava Hills (Slovene: Posavsko hribovje) northwest of Kozje. The area is part of the historical Styria region. The municipality is now included in the Savinja Statistical Region.

The local church, built in the hamlet of Pokorna Vas (Slovene: Pokorna vas) in the settlement, is dedicated to Saint Andrew and belongs to the Parish of Zagorje. It dates to the first half of the 16th century.
