= Gorjane =

- Location in Slovenia
- Coordinates: 46°2′18.39″N 15°33′59.49″E
- Country: Slovenia
- Traditional region: Styria
- Statistical region: Savinja
- Municipality: Kozje

Area
  - Total: 2.56 km^{2} (0.99 sq mi)
- Elevation: 412.3 m (1,353 ft)

Population (2002)
  - Total: 158

Gorjane (pronounced [ɡɔɾˈjaːnɛ]) is a settlement west of Podsreda in the Municipality of Kozje in eastern Slovenia. The area is part of the traditional region of Styria. The municipality is now included in the Savinja Statistical Region.
