= Vrenska Gorca =

- Location in Slovenia
- Coordinates: 46°5′40.81″N 15°35′10.01″E
- Country: Slovenia
- Traditional region: Styria
- Statistical region: Savinja
- Municipality: Kozje

Area
  - Total: 3.58 km^{2} (1.38 sq mi)
- Elevation: 225 m (738 ft)

Population (2002)
  - Total: 175

Vrenska Gorca (pronounced [ˈwɾeːnska ˈɡoːɾtsa], German: Wrenskagorza) is a settlement south of Buče in the Municipality of Kozje in eastern Slovenia. The municipality is included in the Savinja Statistical Region. The area is part of the historical region of Styria.
