= Ples, Bistrica ob Sotli =

Ples
- Location in Slovenia
- Coordinates: 46°4′29.9″N 15°39′2.9″E
- Country: Slovenia
- Traditional region: Styria
- Statistical region: Lower Sava
- Municipality: Bistrica ob Sotli

Area
  - Total: 1.32 km^{2} (0.51 sq mi)
- Elevation: 239.2 m (785 ft)

Population (2020)
  - Total: 77
  - Density: 58/km^{2} (150/sq mi)

Ples (pronounced [ˈpleːs], sometimes Ples ob Sotli) is a settlement in the hills above the right bank of the Sotla River in the Municipality of Bistrica ob Sotli in eastern Slovenia. The area is part of the traditional region of Styria. It is now included in the Lower Sava Statistical Region; until January 2014 it was part of the Savinja Statistical Region.

== Geography ==
Ples is a scattered village at the foot and on the slopes of Mount Vina (Slovene: Vina gora, elevation 327 meters or 1,073 feet) between the Sotla River and the road from Bistrica ob Sotli to Podčetrtek. The soil is loamy. Tilled fields are found at the base of Mount Vina, and vineyards are planted on its slopes.

== Mass graves ==
Ples is the site of two known mass graves associated with the Second World War. The Mount Vina 1 and 2 mass graves (Slovene: Grobišče pod hribom Vina gora 1, 2) are located on the southern slope of Mount Vina and contain the remains of about 25 victims. Their nationality and whether they were soldiers or civilians is not known. The first grave is located in a woods and the second grave is in a meadow on somewhat leveled terrain below Holy Cross Church.

== Church ==
The local church is built on a hill known as Mount Vina (Slovene: Vina gora) and is dedicated to the Holy Cross and belongs to the Parish of Sveti Peter pod Svetimi Gorami. It was built in 1607 and the belfry was added in the last quarter of the 19th century.
