= Zeče pri Bučah =

- Location in Slovenia
- Coordinates: 46°5′50.7″N 15°33′31.87″E
- Country: Slovenia
- Traditional region: Styria
- Statistical region: Savinja
- Municipality: Kozje

Area
  - Total: 1.2 km^{2} (0.46 sq mi)
- Elevation: 343.8 m (1,128 ft)

Population (2002)
  - Total: 47

Zeče pri Bučah (pronounced [ˈzeːtʃɛ pɾi ˈbuːtʃax]) is a settlement west of Buče in the Municipality of Kozje in eastern Slovenia. The municipality is included in the Savinja Statistical Region and the entire area is part of the historical region of Styria.

== Name ==
The name of the settlement was changed from Zeče to Zeče pri Bučah in 1953.
