= Trebče =

- Location in Slovenia
- Coordinates: 46°2′43.74″N 15°37′50.01″E
- Country: Slovenia
- Traditional region: Styria
- Statistical region: Lower Sava
- Municipality: Bistrica ob Sotli

Area
  - Total: 5.18 km^{2} (2.00 sq mi)
- Elevation: 252.5 m (828 ft)

Population (2020)
  - Total: 231
  - Density: 44.6/km^{2} (115/sq mi)

Trebče (pronounced [ˈtɾeːptʃɛ]) is a settlement in the Municipality of Bistrica ob Sotli in eastern Slovenia. It lies on the main road leading west from Bistrica ob Sotli to Podsreda in the adjacent Municipality of Kozje. The area is part of the traditional region of Styria. It is now included in the Lower Sava Statistical Region; until January 2014 it was part of the Savinja Statistical Region.

== Mass grave ==
On May 13, 2026, the Slovenian Directorate for War Veterans and Military Heritage handed over the remains of Croatian victims of the killings after the Second World War to Croatia in Dobrava Memorial Park near Maribor. Ten of the victims were men 18 to 40 years old, exhumed from 2013 to 2017 in Trebče. The victims were buried in a ceremony at Donji Macelj, Croatia, on August 22, 2026.
