= Dobležiče =

- Location in Slovenia
- Coordinates: 46°7′16.9″N 15°32′15.42″E
- Country: Slovenia
- Traditional region: Styria
- Statistical region: Savinja
- Municipality: Kozje

Area
  - Total: 1.87 km^{2} (0.72 sq mi)
- Elevation: 339.5 m (1,114 ft)

Population (2002)
  - Total: 127

Dobležiče (pronounced [ˈdoːblɛʒitʃɛ]) is a settlement in the Municipality of Kozje in eastern Slovenia. The area is part of the historical Styria region. The municipality is now included in the Savinja Statistical Region.

The local church is dedicated to the Holy Trinity (Slovene: Sveta Trojica) and belongs to the Parish of Pilštanj. It has a Romanesque core with major 18th-century rebuilding phases.
