= Poklek pri Podsredi =

- Location in Slovenia
- Coordinates: 46°1′58″N 15°33′57.42″E
- Country: Slovenia
- Traditional region: Styria
- Statistical region: Savinja
- Municipality: Kozje

Area
  - Total: 1.98 km^{2} (0.76 sq mi)
- Elevation: 339.5 m (1,114 ft)

Population (2002)
  - Total: 119

Poklek pri Podsredi (pronounced [ˈpoːklɛk pɾi pɔˈtsɾeːdi]) is a small settlement west of Podsreda in the Municipality of Kozje in eastern Slovenia. It is part of the traditional region of Styria. The municipality is now included in the Savinja Statistical Region.

== Name ==
The name of the settlement was changed from Poklek to Poklek pri Podsredi in 1953.
