= Gubno =

- Location in Slovenia
- Coordinates: 46°7′8.57″N 15°30′45.91″E
- Country: Slovenia
- Traditional region: Styria
- Statistical region: Savinja
- Municipality: Kozje

Area
  - Total: 3.26 km^{2} (1.26 sq mi)
- Elevation: 428.1 m (1,405 ft)

Population (2002)
  - Total: 179

Gubno (pronounced [ˈɡuːbnɔ]) is a village in the Municipality of Kozje in eastern Slovenia. The area is part of the historical Styria region. The municipality is now included in the Savinja Statistical Region.

The local church is dedicated to Saints Primus and Felician and belongs to the Parish of Pilštanj. It dates to the 16th century with later reworking in the Baroque style.
