= Municipality of Kozje =

Municipality of Slovenia

Municipality of Kozje Občina Kozje
- Municipality
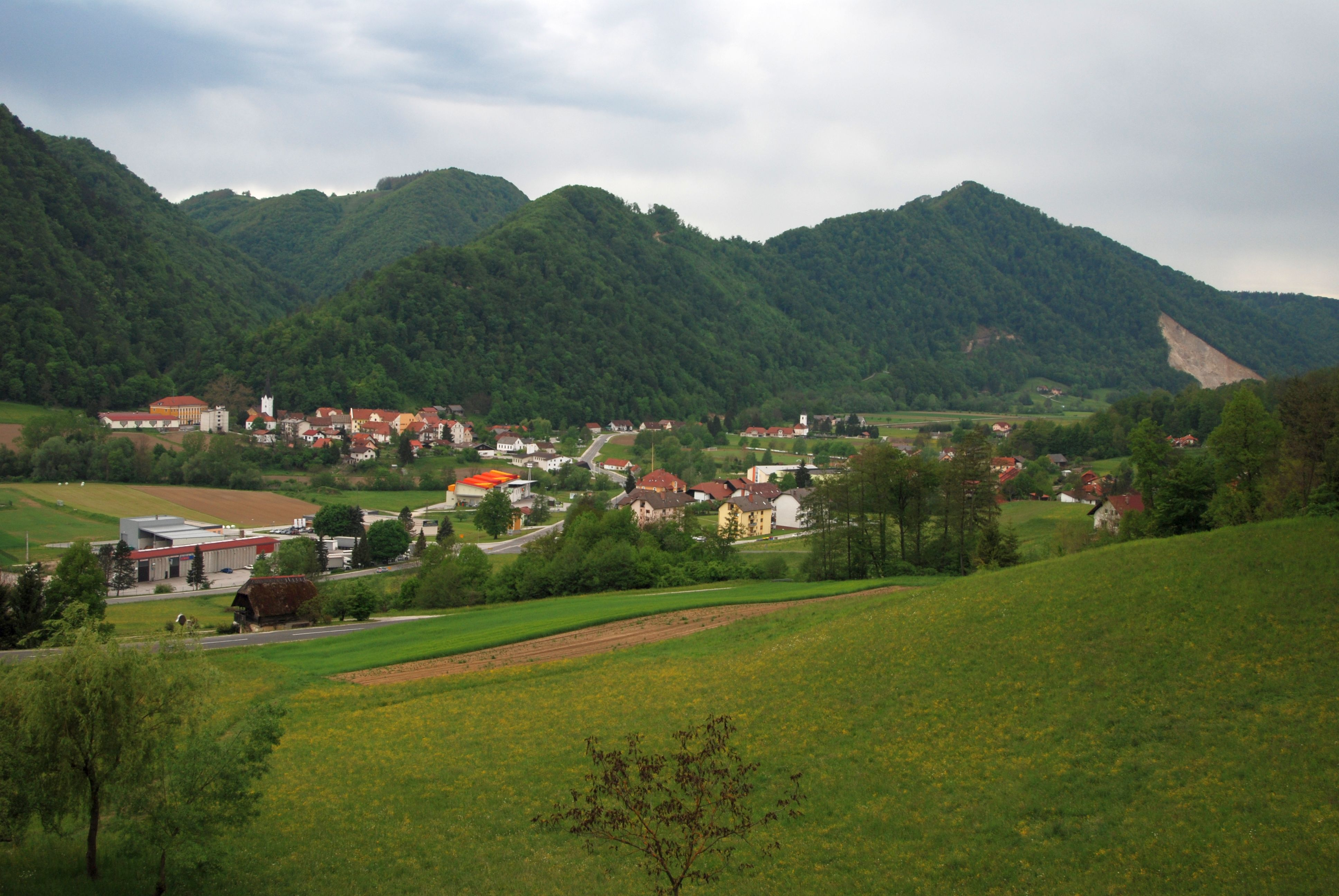

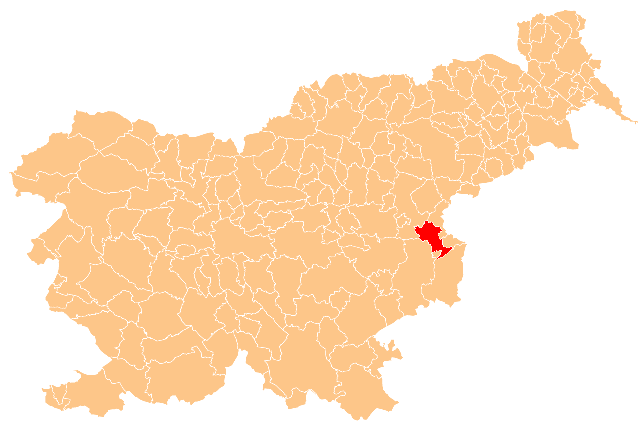
- Location of the Municipality of Kozje in Slovenia
- Coordinates: 46°06′N 15°31′E
- Country: Slovenia

Government
  - Mayor: Milenca Krajnc (Independent)

Area
  - Total: 89.7 km^{2} (34.6 sq mi)

Population (2021)
  - Total: 3,010
  - Density: 33.6/km^{2} (86.9/sq mi)
- Time zone: UTC+01 (CET)
  - Summer (DST): UTC+02 (CEST)
- Website: www.obcina-kozje.si

The Municipality of Kozje (pronounced [ˈkoːzjɛ]; Slovene: Občina Kozje) is a municipality in the traditional region of Styria in northeastern Slovenia. The seat of the municipality is the town of Kozje. Kozje became a municipality in 1994.

== Settlements ==
In addition to the municipal seat of Kozje, the municipality also includes the settlements of Bistrica, Buče, Dobležiče, Drensko Rebro, Gorjane, Gradišče, Gubno, Ješovec pri Kozjem, Klake, Lesično, Ortnice, Osredek pri Podsredi, Pilštanj, Podsreda, Poklek pri Podsredi, Topolovo, Vetrnik, Vojsko, Vrenska Gorca, Zagorje, Zdole, and Zeče pri Bučah.
