= Vetrnik =

- Location in Slovenia
- Coordinates: 46°4′9.03″N 15°31′5.65″E
- Country: Slovenia
- Traditional region: Styria
- Statistical region: Savinja
- Municipality: Kozje

Area
  - Total: 12.06 km^{2} (4.66 sq mi)
- Elevation: 652.2 m (2,140 ft)

Population (2002)
  - Total: 153

Vetrnik (pronounced [ˈʋeːtəɾnik]) is a dispersed settlement in the Municipality of Kozje in eastern Slovenia. It lies in the southern part of the Sava Hills (Slovene: Posavsko hribovje) west and south of Kozje. The area is part of the historical Styria region. The municipality is now included in the Savinja Statistical Region.
