= Polje pri Bistrici =

- Location in Slovenia
- Coordinates: 46°4′0.24″N 15°39′34.66″E
- Country: Slovenia
- Traditional region: Styria
- Statistical region: Lower Sava
- Municipality: Bistrica ob Sotli

Area
  - Total: 1.91 km^{2} (0.74 sq mi)
- Elevation: 179 m (587 ft)

Population (2020)
  - Total: 69
  - Density: 36/km^{2} (94/sq mi)

Polje pri Bistrici (pronounced [ˈpoːljɛ pɾi ˈbiːstɾitsi]) is a settlement on the right bank of the Sotla River in the Municipality of Bistrica ob Sotli in eastern Slovenia, right on the border with Croatia. The area is part of the traditional region of Styria. It is now included in the Lower Sava Statistical Region; until January 2014 it was part of the Savinja Statistical Region.
