= Municipality of Bistrica ob Sotli =

Municipality of Slovenia

Municipality of Bistrica ob Sotli Občina Bistrica ob Sotli
- Municipality
- Location of the Municipality of Bistrica ob Sotli in Slovenia
- Coordinates: 46°3′32″N 15°39′51″E
- Country: Slovenia

Government
  - Mayor: Franjo Debelak (Independent)

Area
  - Total: 31.1 km^{2} (12.0 sq mi)
- Elevation: 230 m (750 ft)

Population (July 1, 2018)
  - Total: 1,350
  - Density: 43.4/km^{2} (112/sq mi)
- Time zone: UTC+01 (CET)
  - Summer (DST): UTC+02 (CEST)
- Postal code: 3256
- Vehicle registration: CE
- Website: www.bistricaobsotli.si

The Municipality of Bistrica ob Sotli (pronounced [ˈbiːstɾitsa ɔp ˈsoːtli]; Slovene: Občina Bistrica ob Sotli) is a municipality in eastern Slovenia. It has been an independent municipality since 1999; before, it was part of the Municipality of Podčetrtek. The seat of the municipality is the town of Bistrica ob Sotli. The area belongs to the traditional region of Styria. It is now included in the Lower Sava Statistical Region; until January 2014, it was part of the Savinja Statistical Region. It borders Croatia.

== Settlements ==
In addition to the municipal seat of Bistrica ob Sotli, the municipality also includes the following settlements:

- Črešnjevec ob Bistrici
- Dekmanca
- Hrastje ob Bistrici
- Križan Vrh
- Kunšperk
- Ples
- Polje pri Bistrici
- Srebrnik
- Trebče
- Zagaj

== Demographics ==
Population by native language, 2002 Census

Slovene	1,354
Croatian	57
Serbo-Croatian	4
Bosnian	3
German	3
Others	4
Unknown	35
