= Ješovec pri Kozjem =

- Location in Slovenia
- Coordinates: 46°4′42.47″N 15°34′13.54″E
- Country: Slovenia
- Traditional region: Styria
- Statistical region: Savinja
- Municipality: Kozje

Area
  - Total: 2.86 km^{2} (1.10 sq mi)
- Elevation: 339.6 m (1,114 ft)

Population (2002)
  - Total: 155

Ješovec pri Kozjem (pronounced [jɛˈʃɔːʋəts pɾi ˈkoːzjɛm] or [jɛˈʃoːʋəts pɾi ˈkoːzjɛm]) is a dispersed settlement in the hills east of Kozje in eastern Slovenia. The area is part of the historical Styria region. The Municipality of Kozje is now included in the Savinja Statistical Region.

== Name ==
The name of the settlement was changed from Ješovec to Ješovec pri Kozjem in 1953.

== Cultural heritage ==
A small chapel-shrine in the settlement dates to 1820.
