= Črešnjevec ob Bistrici =

- Location in Slovenia
- Coordinates: 46°3′9.64″N 15°37′53.56″E
- Country: Slovenia
- Traditional region: Styria
- Statistical region: Lower Sava
- Municipality: Bistrica ob Sotli

Area
  - Total: 1.44 km^{2} (0.56 sq mi)
- Elevation: 259.1 m (850 ft)

Population (2020)
  - Total: 77
  - Density: 53/km^{2} (140/sq mi)

Črešnjevec ob Bistrici (pronounced [ˈtʃɾeːʃnjɛʋəts ɔb ˈbiːstɾitsi]) is a settlement in the Municipality of Bistrica ob Sotli in eastern Slovenia. The area is part of the traditional region of Styria. It is now included in the Lower Sava Statistical Region; until January 2014 it was part of the Savinja Statistical Region.

== Name ==
The name of the settlement was changed from Črešnjevec to Črešnjevec ob Bistrici in 1953.
