= Križan Vrh =

- Location in Slovenia
- Coordinates: 46°3′53.39″N 15°36′49.85″E
- Country: Slovenia
- Traditional region: Styria
- Statistical region: Lower Sava
- Municipality: Bistrica ob Sotli

Area
  - Total: 4.06 km^{2} (1.57 sq mi)
- Elevation: 351 m (1,152 ft)

Population (2020)
  - Total: 69
  - Density: 17/km^{2} (44/sq mi)

Križan Vrh (pronounced [ˈkɾiːʒaɱ ˈʋəɾx]) is a settlement in the Municipality of Bistrica ob Sotli in eastern Slovenia. The area is part of the traditional region of Styria. It is now included in the Lower Sava Statistical Region; until January 2014 it was part of the Savinja Statistical Region.

The hamlet of Trebeže in the settlement with its traditional mid–19th-century farmhouses, barns, and outbuildings has been protected as a national heritage site by the Slovenian Ministry of Culture.
