= Dekmanca =

- Location in Slovenia
- Coordinates: 46°4′50.41″N 15°37′47.27″E
- Country: Slovenia
- Traditional region: Styria
- Statistical region: Lower Sava
- Municipality: Bistrica ob Sotli

Area
  - Total: 2.59 km^{2} (1.00 sq mi)
- Elevation: 199.7 m (655 ft)

Population (2020)
  - Total: 109
  - Density: 42.1/km^{2} (109/sq mi)

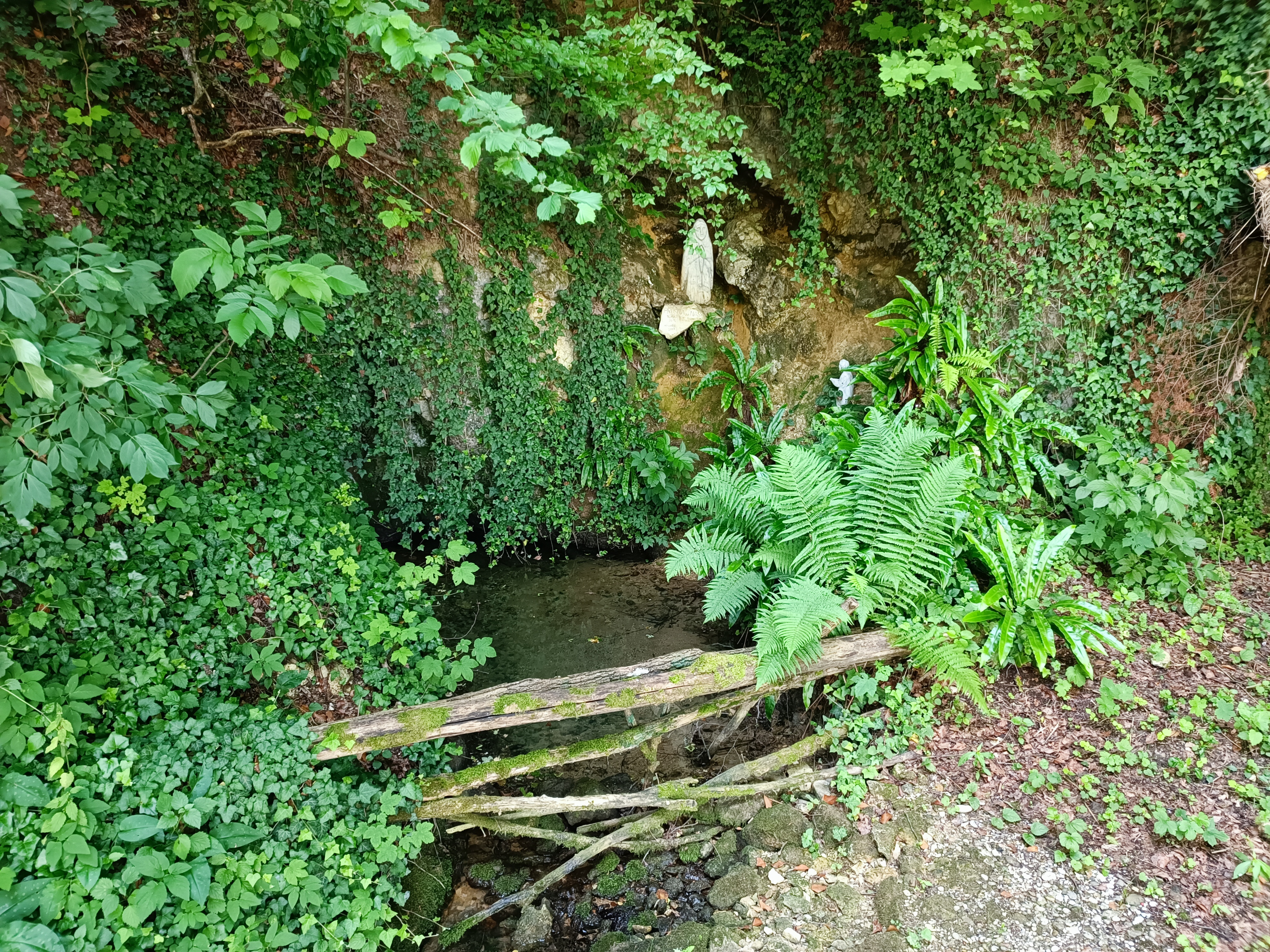
Davjek karst spring

Dekmanca (pronounced [ˈdeːkmantsa]; German: Deckmannsdorf) is a settlement on the right bank of the Sotla River in the Municipality of Bistrica ob Sotli in eastern Slovenia, right on the border with Croatia. The area is part of the traditional region of Styria. It is now included in the Lower Sava Statistical Region; until January 2014 it was part of the Savinja Statistical Region. The settlement includes the hamlets of Graben, Bobovec, and Gmajna.

== Name ==
Dekmanca was attested in written sources in 1351 as Dyͤtmarstorff (and as Dietmarsdorf in 1404, Dietmansdorf in 1426, and Dietmannsdorff in 1480). The name is derived from the German personal name Dietmar or Dietman. Locally, Dekmanca is known as Dekmarca. In modern German it was known as Deckmannsdorf.

== History ==
There is surface evidence of an Ancient Roman settlement in the Groblje area in Dekmanca. The site has been protected as a national heritage site by the Slovenian Ministry of Culture, but it has not been investigated in any detail so far.

== Davjek karst spring ==
Davjek, a karst spring, is in the isolated karst of Kozje Regional Park (Slovene: Kozjanski regijski park). The spring measures 1 meter (3 ft 3 in) in diameter and continues into a stream, where there is another smaller spring, which is also used for drinking. The stream flows into the Sotla River. The basin itself is about 10 meters (33 ft) long and 8 meters (26 ft) wide. The spring was formed at the contact between the slope and the surrounding plain, at the juncture between permeable limestone and impermeable marl. People have picnics, take walks in the area, and hold small parties near the spring.
