= Zafara, Žužemberk =

Zafara
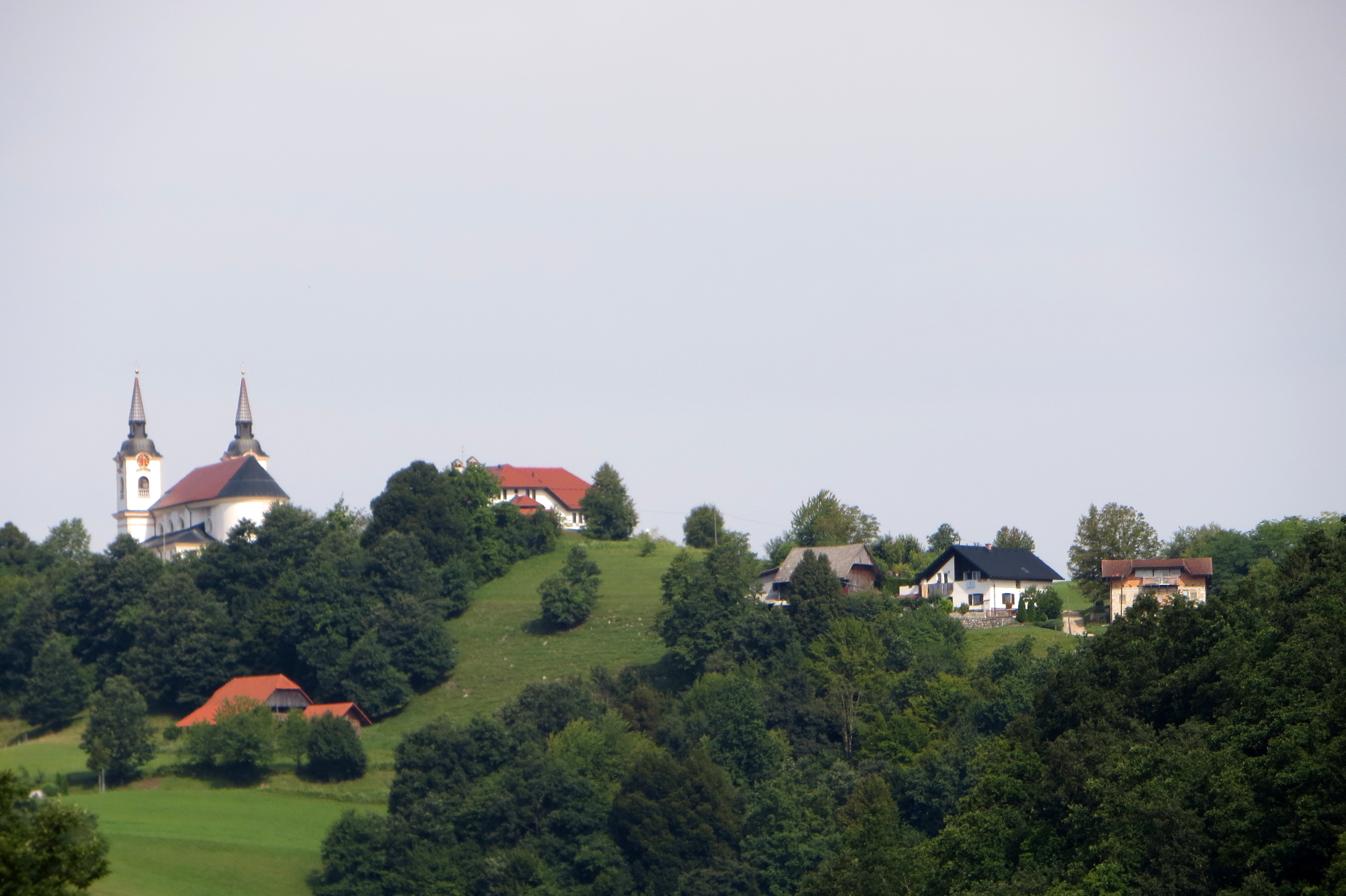

- Location in Slovenia
- Coordinates: 45°50′1.33″N 14°56′30.97″E
- Country: Slovenia
- Traditional region: Lower Carniola
- Statistical region: Southeast Slovenia
- Municipality: Žužemberk

Area
  - Total: 3.01 km^{2} (1.16 sq mi)
- Elevation: 303.5 m (996 ft)

Population (2002)
  - Total: 39

Zafara (pronounced [zaˈfaːɾa]) is a settlement on the eastern outskirts of Žužemberk in southeastern Slovenia. The area is part of the historical region of Lower Carniola. The Municipality of Žužemberk is now included in the Southeast Slovenia Statistical Region.

== Church of Saints Hermagoras and Fortunatus ==
The Žužemberk parish church, dedicated to Saints Hermagoras and Fortunatus, is located in Zafara. It was burned down by the Partisans in 1944 after it had been used by the Home Guard. The Home Guard troops had entrenched themselves there on 23 April 1944 together with a group of Germans. The Partisans attached on 2 May in an operation led by Franc Rozman, forcing the Home Guard to withdraw. After this, the Partisans announced that they planned to destroy the church. They filled the church with hay and straw on 3 May and burned it down on 4 May. Dean Karel Gnidovec (1877–1962) managed to save some of the church's statues and paintings by transporting them to a barn at Cvibelj pri Žužemberku, but this was later hit during a bombing raid and the artworks were destroyed. The day after the church was burned, the Partisans dynamited the walls of the church and the parsonage, and burned the roof of the castle in Žužemberk. The church was rebuilt in the late 20th century.
