= Zidani Most, Trebnje =

Zidani Most
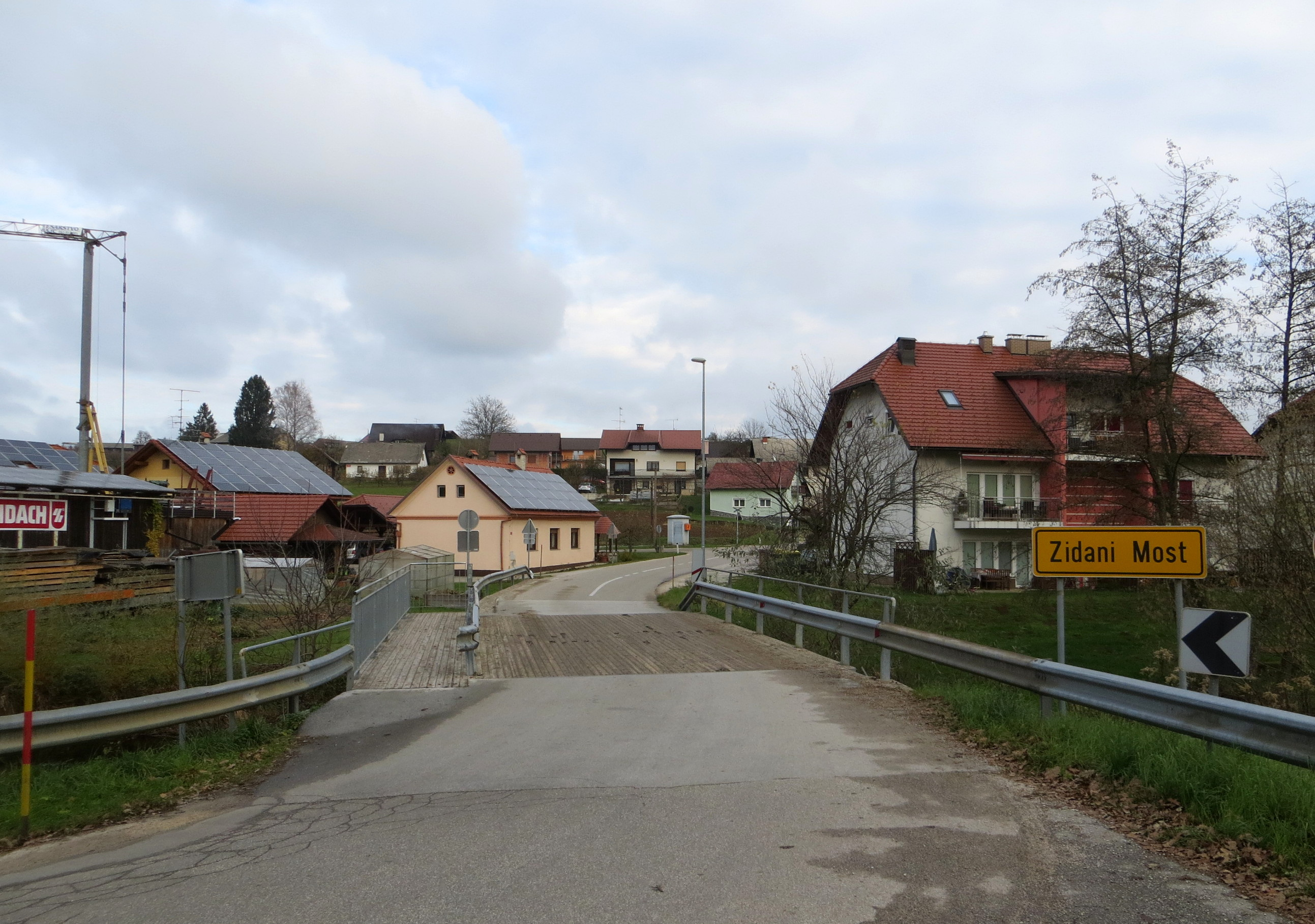

- Location in Slovenia
- Coordinates: 45°54′45.78″N 14°58′48.97″E
- Country: Slovenia
- Traditional region: Lower Carniola
- Statistical region: Southeast Slovenia
- Municipality: Trebnje

Area
  - Total: 0.05 km^{2} (0.019 sq mi)
- Elevation: 275.7 m (905 ft)

Population (2002)
  - Total: 13

Zidani Most (pronounced [ˈziːdani ˈmoːst]) is a small settlement on the Temenica River east of Trebnje in the historical region of Lower Carniola in Slovenia. The municipality is now included in the Southeast Slovenia Statistical Region.
