= Zabava, Zagorje ob Savi =

Zabava
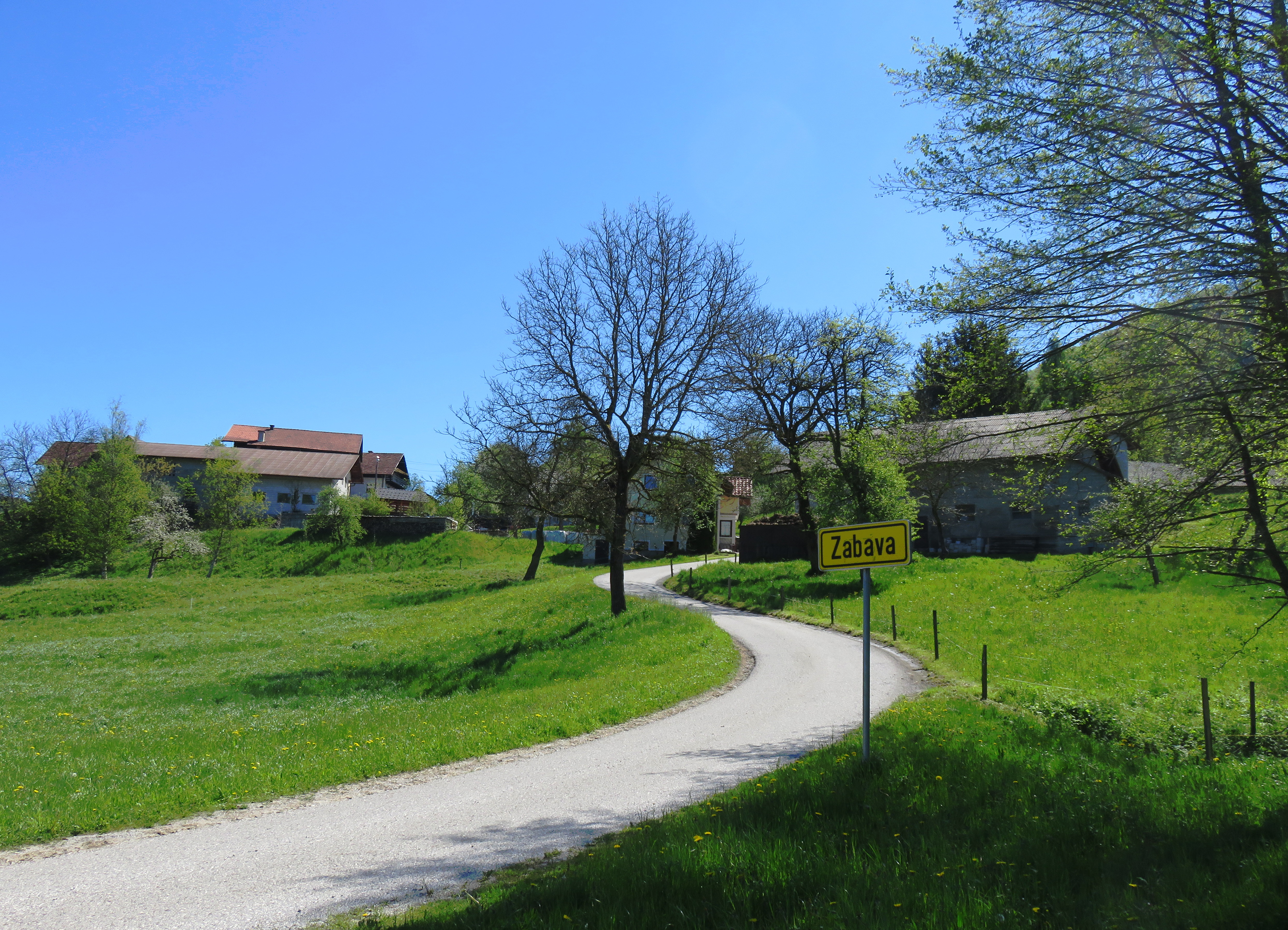

- Location in Slovenia
- Coordinates: 46°8′38.05″N 14°53′4.79″E
- Country: Slovenia
- Traditional region: Upper Carniola
- Statistical region: Central Sava
- Municipality: Zagorje ob Savi

Area
  - Total: 0.82 km^{2} (0.32 sq mi)
- Elevation: 431 m (1,414 ft)

Population (2002)
  - Total: 47
- Postal code: 1411

Zabava (pronounced [zaˈbaːʋa]; German: Sabawa) is a settlement in the Municipality of Zagorje ob Savi in central Slovenia. It lies just off the main road leading west from Izlake, south of Mlinše. The area is part of the traditional region of Upper Carniola. It is now included with the rest of the municipality in the Central Sava Statistical Region.

== Name ==
Zabava was attested in historical sources as Sagaw in 1319, Zapaw in 1332, and Sabaw in 1496. The Slovene common noun zabava has the meaning 'obstacle, hindrance; quarrel' (the modern meaning 'party' was later borrowed from other Slavic languages, and it is not related to the name of the settlement). The motivation for the name may lie in some sort of property dispute in the past.
