= Lesično =

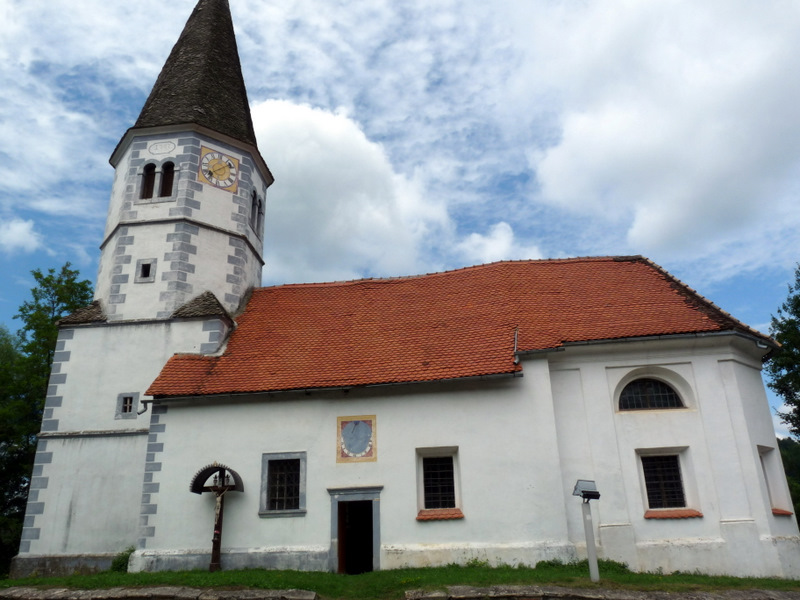

- Location in Slovenia
- Coordinates: 46°6′20.67″N 15°30′37.08″E
- Country: Slovenia
- Traditional region: Styria
- Statistical region: Savinja
- Municipality: Kozje

Area
  - Total: 8.03 km^{2} (3.10 sq mi)
- Elevation: 337.7 m (1,108 ft)

Population (2002)
  - Total: 195

Lesično (pronounced [lɛˈsiːtʃnɔ], German: Fuchsdorf) is a village in the Municipality of Kozje in eastern Slovenia. The area is part of the historical Styria region. The municipality is included in the Savinja Statistical Region.

The local church is dedicated to Saint Ulrich (Slovene: sveti Urh) and belongs to the Parish of Pilštanj. It was first mentioned in written documents dating to 1394.
