= Zagaj, Bistrica ob Sotli =

Zagaj
- Location in Slovenia
- Coordinates: 46°3′2.02″N 15°39′21.4″E
- Country: Slovenia
- Traditional region: Styria
- Statistical region: Lower Sava
- Municipality: Bistrica ob Sotli

Area
  - Total: 3.8 km^{2} (1.5 sq mi)
- Elevation: 204.3 m (670 ft)

Population (2020)
  - Total: 124
  - Density: 33/km^{2} (85/sq mi)

Zagaj (pronounced [zaˈɡaːi̯]) is a settlement in the Municipality of Bistrica ob Sotli in eastern Slovenia. The area is part of the traditional region of Styria. It is now included in the Lower Sava Statistical Region; until January 2014 it was part of the Savinja Statistical Region.
