= Znojile pri Čepljah =

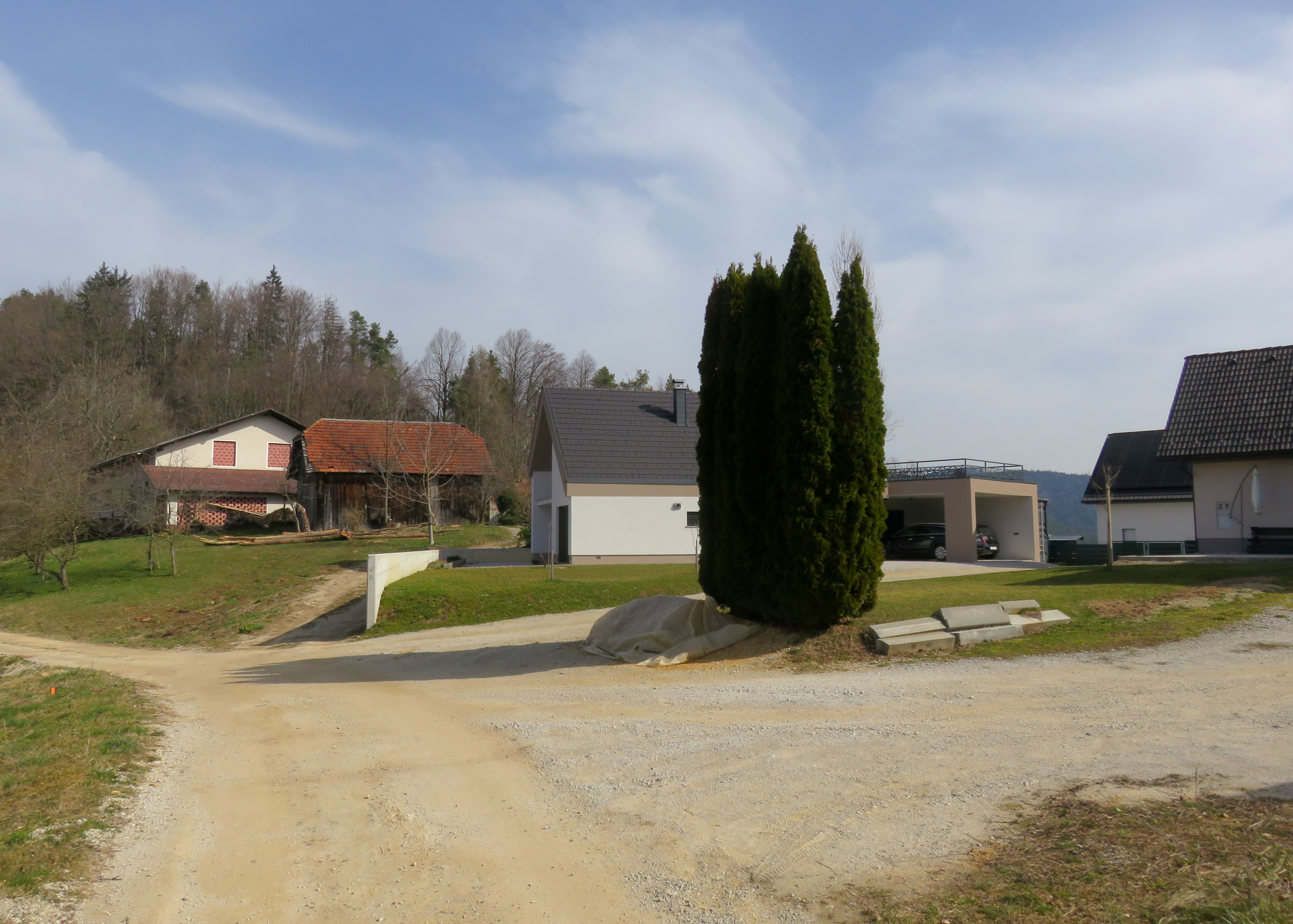

- Location in Slovenia
- Coordinates: 46°10′35″N 14°42′23″E
- Country: Slovenia
- Traditional region: Upper Carniola
- Statistical region: Central Slovenia
- Municipality: Lukovica
- Elevation: 504 m (1,654 ft)

Znojile pri Čepljah (pronounced [znɔˈjiːlɛ pɾi ˈtʃeːpljax], in older sources Snojle, locally Znojilo) is a former village in central Slovenia in the Municipality of Lukovica. It is now part of the village of Čeplje. It is part of the traditional region of Upper Carniola and is now included in the Central Slovenia Statistical Region.

== Geography ==
Znojile pri Čepljah stands on a dolomite ridge northeast of Lukovica pri Domžalah.

== Name ==
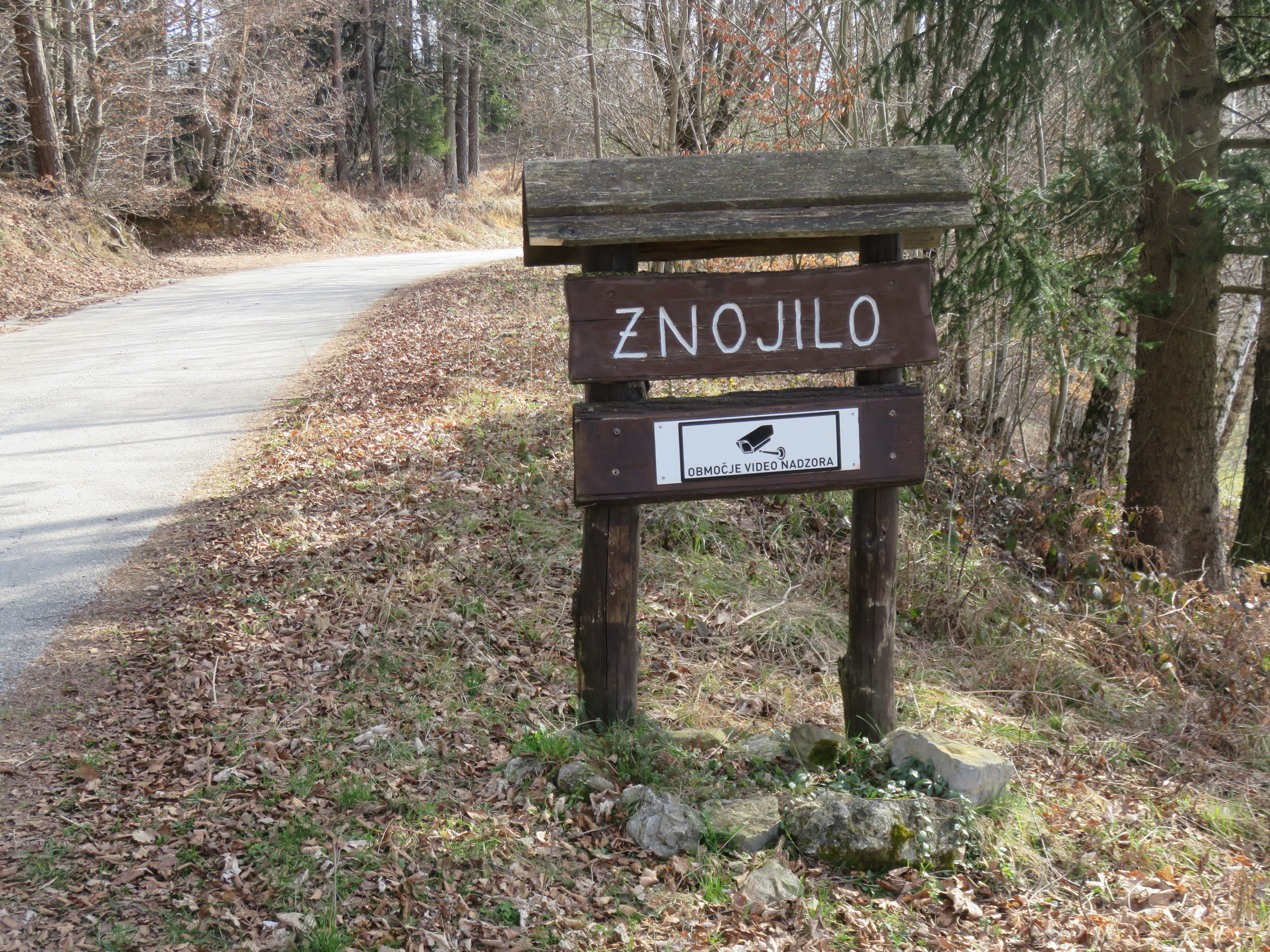
A sign for Znojile pri Čepljah (Znojilo)

The name Znojile is derived from *znoji(d)lo 'sunny or sun-facing area' from the verb *znojiti 'to be warmed by the sun'. The name therefore refers to the geographical orientation of the place.

== History ==
According to oral tradition, French soldiers from the French administration at the beginning of the 19th century are buried below Znojile pri Čepljah and the neighboring hamlet of Gorišek (a.k.a. Goriškovo). During the Second World War, the Partisans built a bunker about 300 meters (980 ft) below Znojile pri Čepljah in June 1942, where they treated wounded soldiers. The bunker was supplied by the nearby farm known as Pri treh sestrah (At the Three Sisters), and Milan Cunder (1908–1970) was one of the physicians that treated patients at the bunker.

Znojile pri Čepljah had a population of 20 (in three houses) in 1880, and 19 (in three houses) in 1900. Znojile pri Čepljah was annexed by Čeplje in 1955, ending its existence as a separate settlement.
