= Zavrh pri Črnivcu =

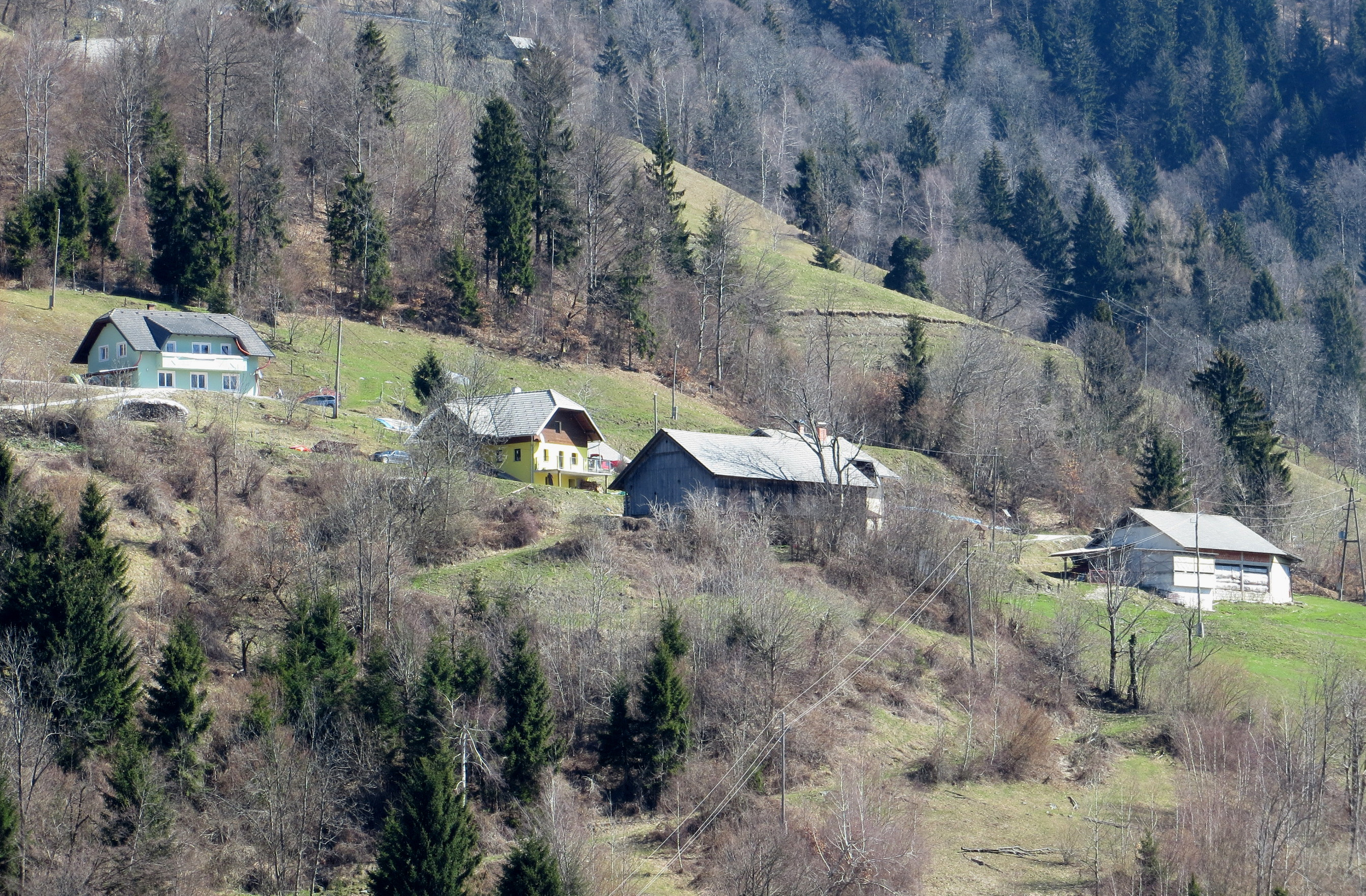

- Location in Slovenia
- Coordinates: 46°15′43.89″N 14°40′46.99″E
- Country: Slovenia
- Traditional region: Upper Carniola
- Statistical region: Central Slovenia
- Municipality: Kamnik

Area
  - Total: 0.63 km^{2} (0.24 sq mi)
- Elevation: 792 m (2,598 ft)

Population (2002)
  - Total: 18

Zavrh pri Črnivcu (pronounced [zaˈʋəɾx pɾi tʃəɾˈniːu̯tsu]) is a dispersed settlement near the Črnivec Pass in the Municipality of Kamnik in the Upper Carniola region of Slovenia.

== Name ==
The name of the settlement was changed from Zavrh to Zavrh pri Črnivcu in 1953.
