= Bistrica ob Sotli =

Bistrica ob Sotli Sveti Peter pod Svetimi Gorami (until 1952)
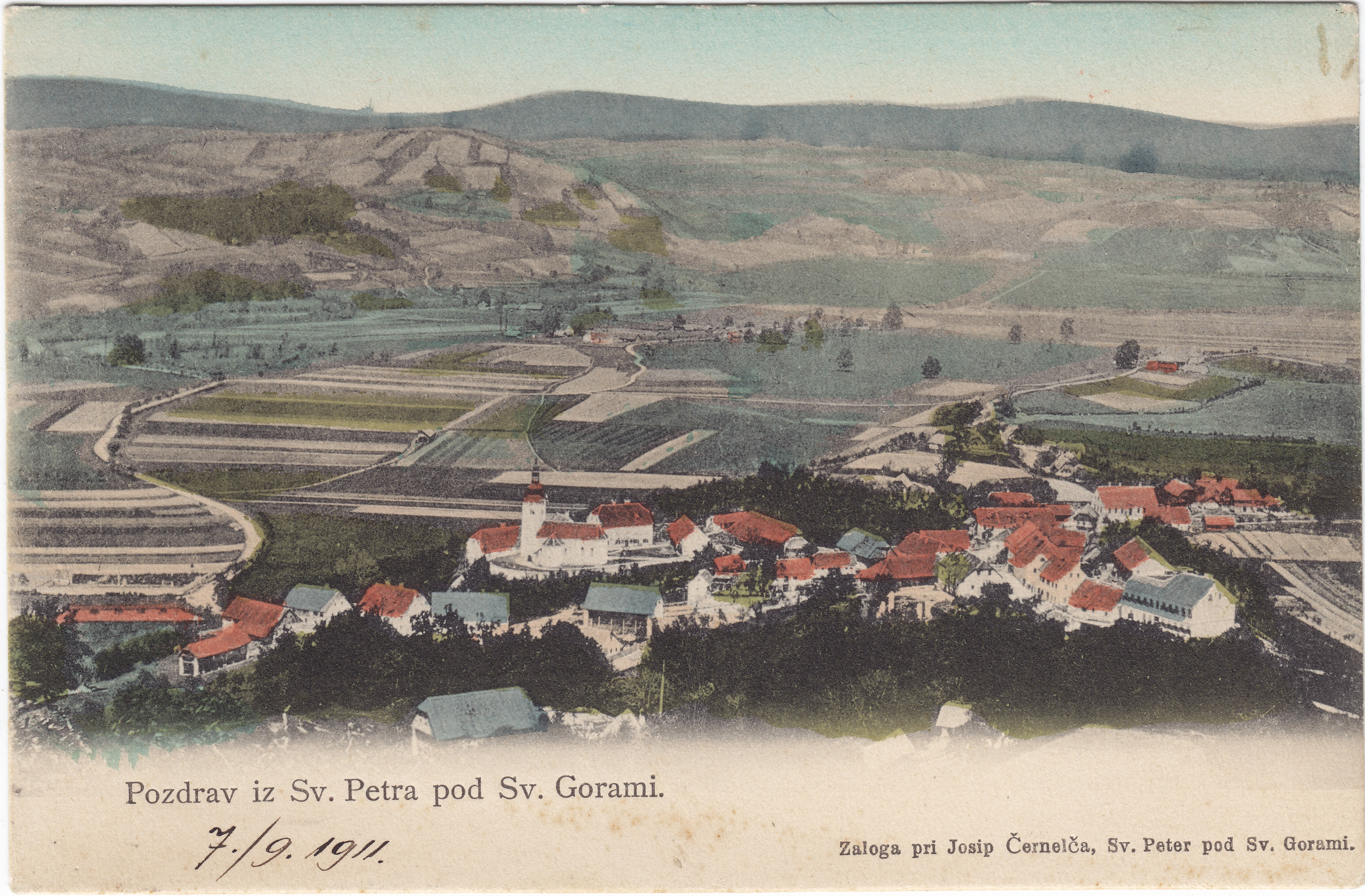
- Postcard of Bistrica ob Sotli (1911)

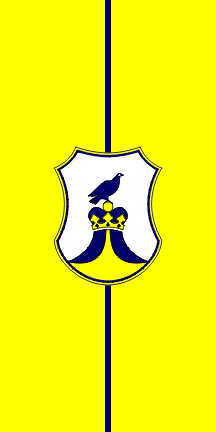
- Flag

- Location of Bistrica ob Sotli in Slovenia
- Coordinates: 46°3′32″N 15°39′51″E
- Country: Slovenia
- Traditional region: Styria
- Statistical region: Lower Sava
- Municipality: Bistrica ob Sotli

Government
  - Mayor: Franjo Debelak (Independent)

Area
  - Total: 2.1 km^{2} (0.81 sq mi)
- Elevation: 230 m (750 ft)

Population (2020)
  - Total: 235
  - Density: 110/km^{2} (290/sq mi)
- Time zone: UTC+01 (CET)
  - Summer (DST): UTC+02 (CEST)
- Website: bistricaobsotli.si

Bistrica ob Sotli (pronounced [ˈbiːstɾitsa ɔp ˈsoːtli]) is a settlement in eastern Slovenia. It is the seat of the Municipality of Bistrica ob Sotli. The settlement lies on a river terrace above the right bank of the Sotla River. The area traditionally belonged to the region of Styria. It is now included in the Lower Sava Statistical Region; until January 2014 it was part of the Savinja Statistical Region. The settlement includes the hamlets of Čehovec, Koče, and Marof.

== Name ==
The settlement was initially known as Leskovec in the Middle Ages. The modern name of the settlement was changed from Sveti Peter pod Svetimi Gorami (literally, 'Saint Peter below the Holy Mountains') to Bistrica ob Sotli (literally, 'clear brook on the Sotla River') in 1952. The name was changed on the basis of the 1948 Law on Names of Settlements and Designations of Squares, Streets, and Buildings as part of efforts by Slovenia's postwar communist government to remove religious elements from toponyms. Locally, the settlement was known as Šempeter. The name Bistrica was originally a hydronym; the Bistrica River flows past the settlement and is a tributary of the Sotla River. In the past, the settlement was known as Sankt Peter bei Königsberg in German. During the Second World War, the settlement was temporarily renamed Königsberg am Sattelbach as part of the Rann Triangle (German: Ranner Dreieck) and designated for resettlement by Gottschee Germans.

== History ==
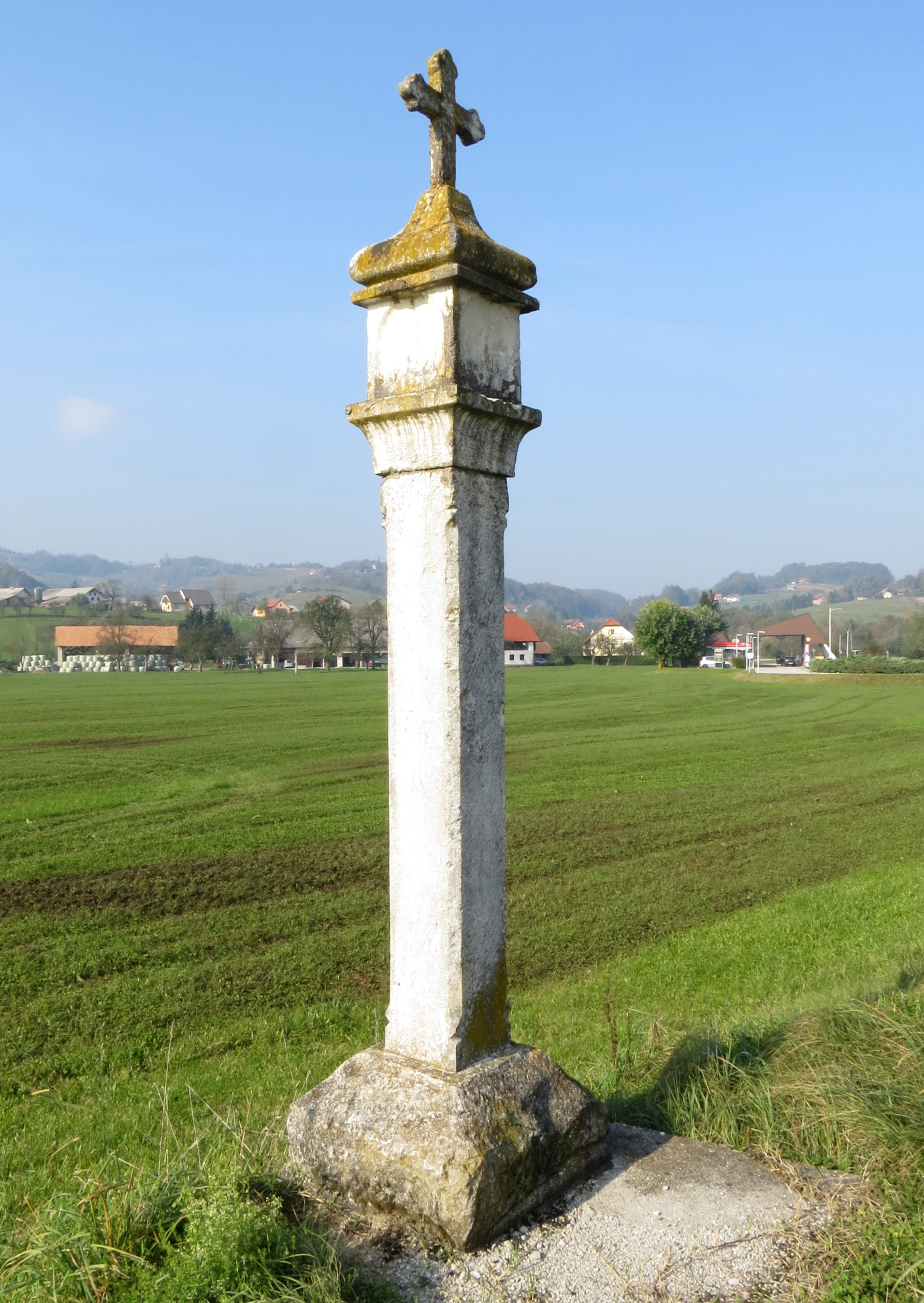
Plague column

Archaeological finds in the area date back to the Illyrians. In 1472, Ottoman forces returning from Carinthia defeated troops under Colonel Seifried von Pohlheim in Bistrica ob Sotli. A peasant army led by Ilija Gregorič defeated forces of the Styrian Estates here on 8 February 1573. The settlement was devastated by the plague in 1645 and 1646, commemorated by a column with a white cross between the settlement and the hamlet of Štadler in neighboring Hrastje ob Bistrici. A school was established in Bistrica ob Sotli in 1829. A stonemason's workshop was active in the settlement in the first half of the 19th century.

In the fall of 1941, the native population was mostly evicted and Gottschee Germans were settled here. 22 November was commemorated as the village holiday in memory of the evicted population. The Partisan soldier Janko Skvarča (a.k.a. Modras, 1915–1943), later proclaimed a People's Hero of Yugoslavia, fell during fighting in Bistrica ob Sotli on 20 December 1943.

=== Mass graves ===
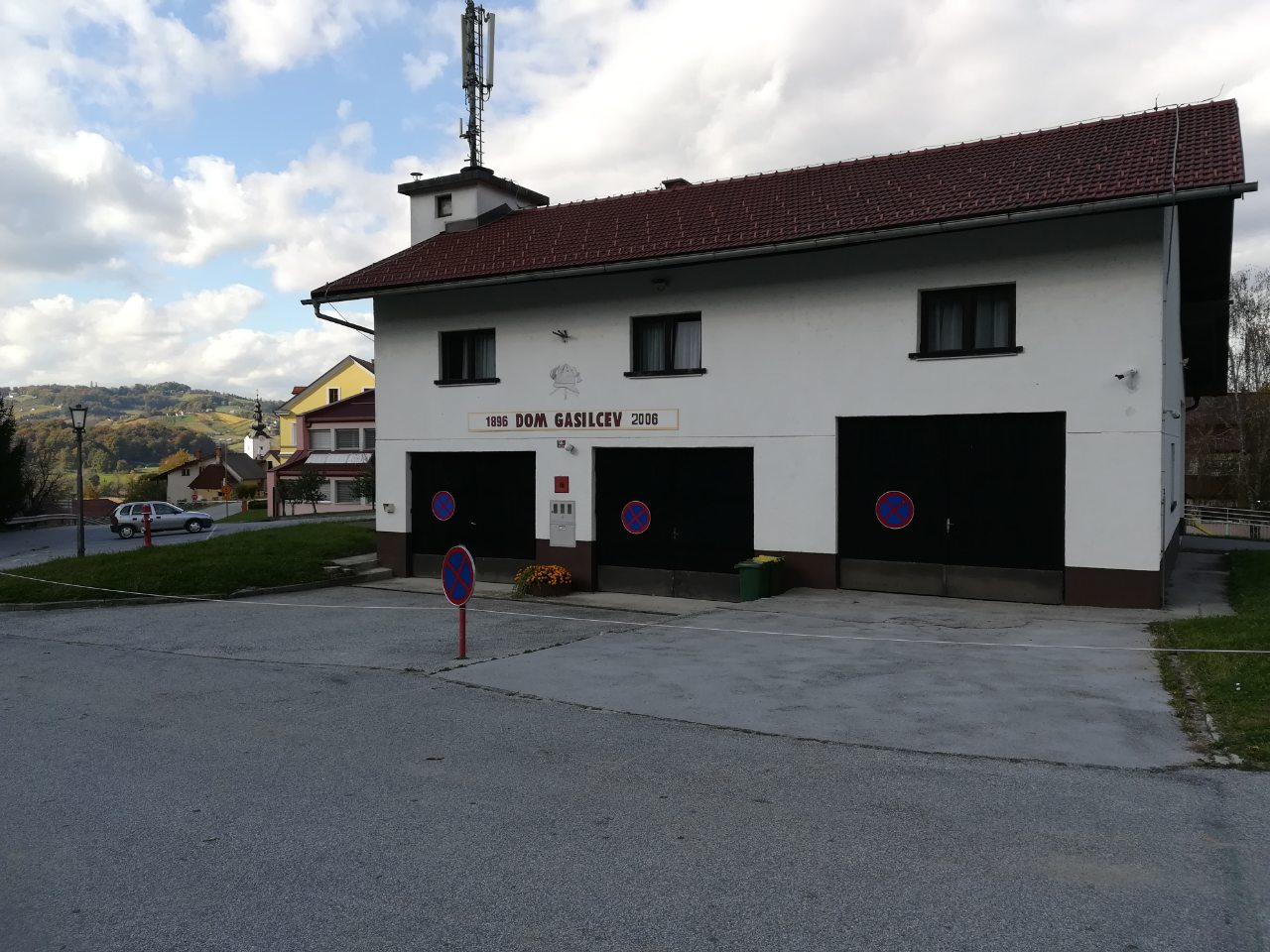
New Fire Station Mass Grave

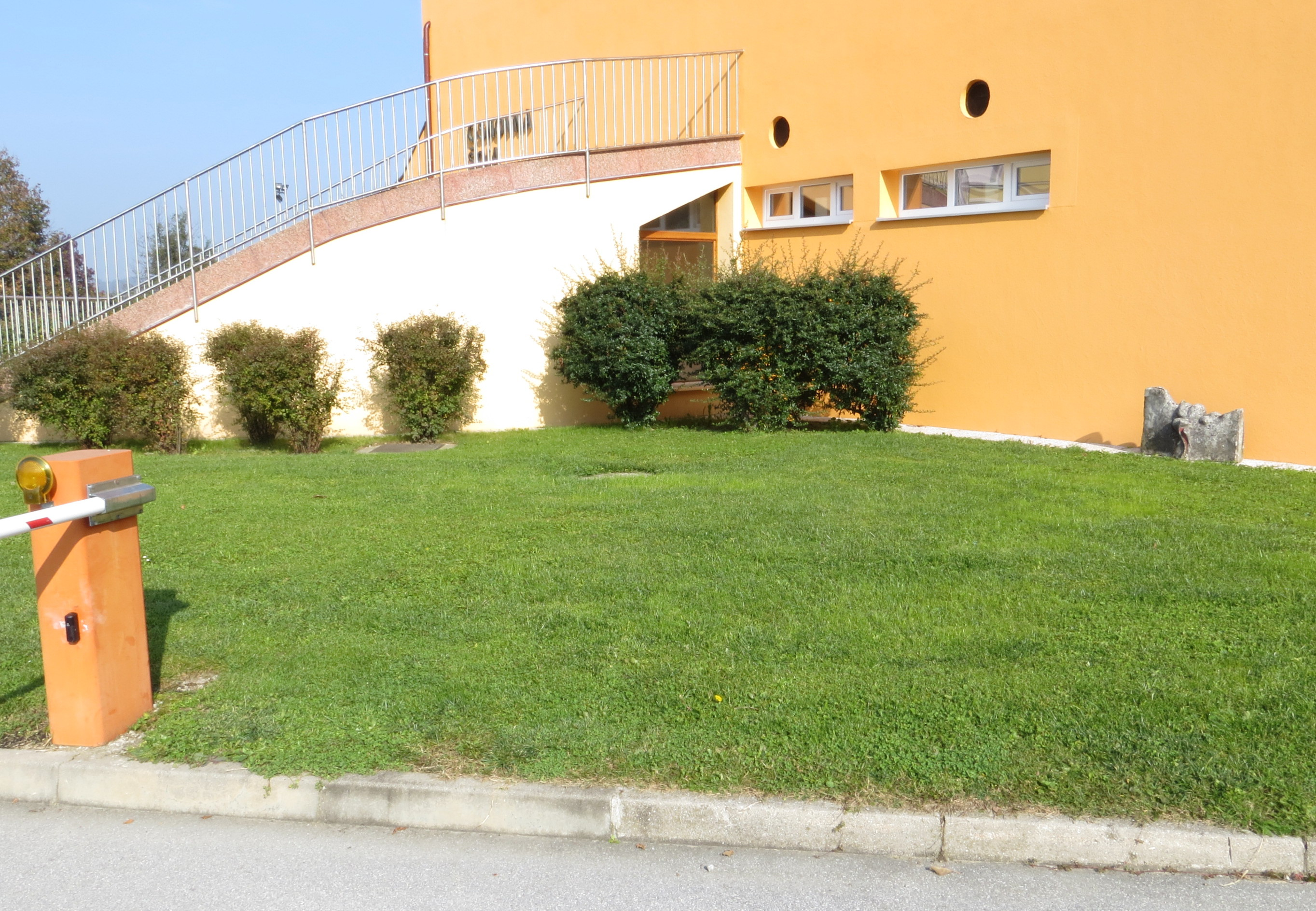
Primary School Mass Grave

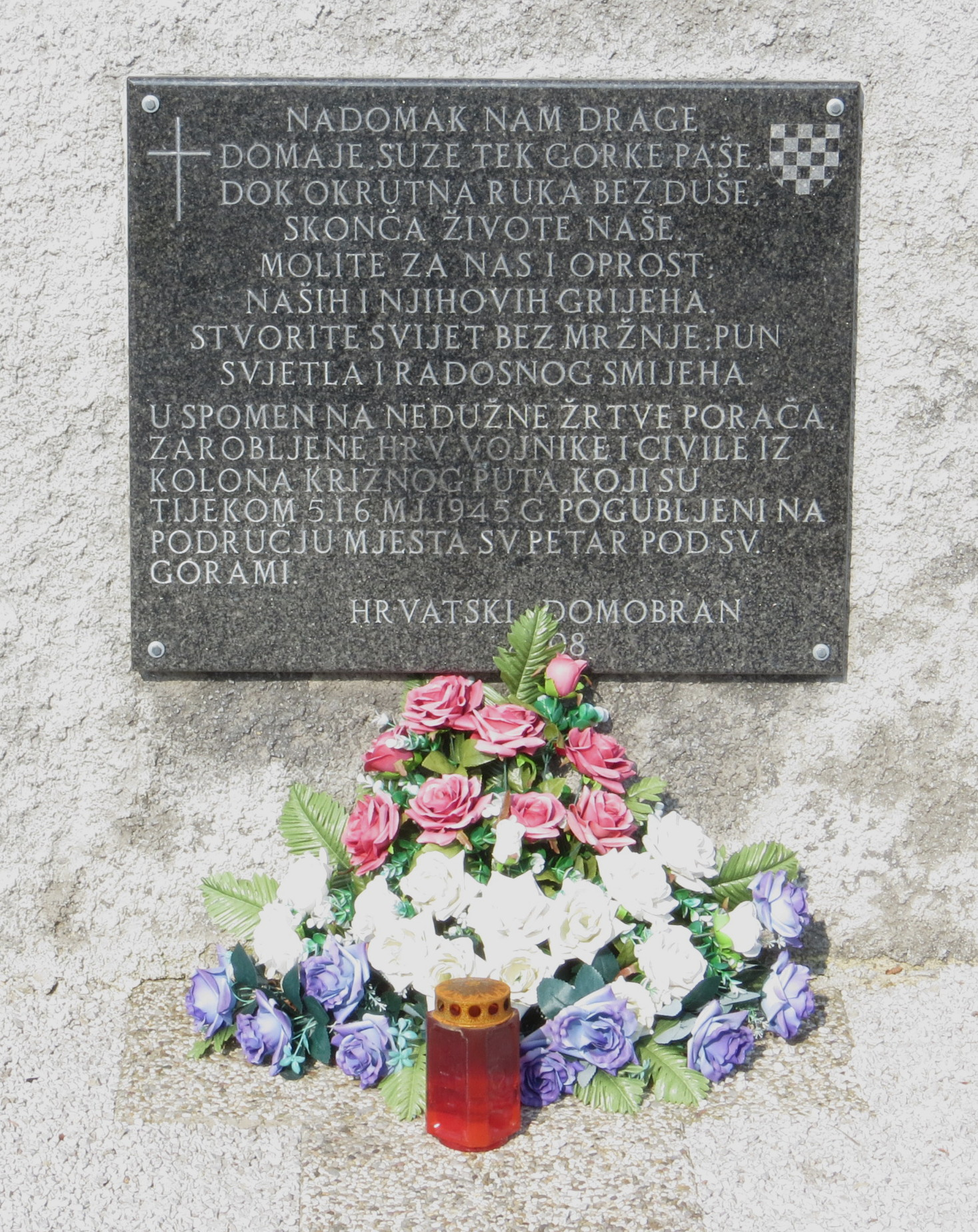
Cemetery plaque

Mass Graves in Bistrica ob Sotli

Bistrica ob Sotli is the site of four known mass graves from the period immediately after the Second World War. Approximately 1,000 Croatian refugees were murdered in several locations in Bistrica ob Sotli in May 1945. All four graves contain the bodies of Croatian civilians and Ustaša soldiers. The Old Fire Station Mass Grave (Slovene: Grobišče pri starem gasilskem domu) is located in a meadow southeast of the old fire station. The New Fire Station Mass Grave (Grobišče pri novem gasilskem domu) extends from the old fire station to the new fire station south of Marija Broz Primary School. The Primary School Mass Grave (Grobišče pri osnovni šoli) was uncovered during excavation work in 1979 for Marija Broz Primary School, revealing human remains and telephone wire. The remains were covered over and the work continued. The Firing Trench below Čehovec Hill Mass Grave (Grobišče strelski jarek pod hribom Čehovec) is located east of the town center in an anti-tank trench or firing trench extending from the slope of Čehovec Hill, about 100 m east of the primary school, north to the road to Kunšperk and then to the northwest.

== Church ==
The parish church in the settlement is dedicated to Saint Peter and belongs to the Roman Catholic Diocese of Celje. The parish is known as Sveti Peter pod Svetimi gorami. The site of the church has evidence of prehistoric and Roman settlement. The actual church building is a Pre-Romanesque building. Most of the internal church furnishings date to the 19th century. The church was first mentioned in written sources in 1257. It was elevated to a parish on 1 October 1640. The chancel is late Gothic and contains frescoes dating to the 15th century. The bell tower was built in 1654, and two chapels and a sacristy were added around 1700. The nave was raised and re-vaulted in the mid-18th century, when a triumphal arch was also added. The bells date to 1582 and 1745. The rectory was built in 1814, and the curate's office in 1830.

== Notable people ==
Notable people that were born or lived in Bistrica ob Sotli include:

- Friderk Degen (1906–2001), economist
- Ivan Geršak (1838–1911), notary, legal writer, and journalist
- Josip Hohnjec (1873–1964), religious writer and politician
- Ivan Lipold (1842–1897), politician and journalist
- Darian Ado Moric (1895–1966), music teacher and opera tenor
- Andrej Reya (1752–1830), religious writer
- Josip Ulaga (1826–1881), religious writer and editor
- Jožef Zabukovšek (1804–1870), religious writer
