= Zdole, Kozje =

Zdole
- Location in Slovenia
- Coordinates: 46°5′20.68″N 15°33′10.62″E
- Country: Slovenia
- Traditional region: Styria
- Statistical region: Savinja
- Municipality: Kozje

Area
  - Total: 2.26 km^{2} (0.87 sq mi)
- Elevation: 425.1 m (1,395 ft)

Population (2002)
  - Total: 115

Zdole (pronounced [ˈzdoːlɛ]) is a settlement in the Municipality of Kozje in eastern Slovenia. It lies in the hills just north of Kozje. The area is part of the historical Styria region. The municipality is now included in the Savinja Statistical Region.
