= Vojsko, Kozje =

Vojsko
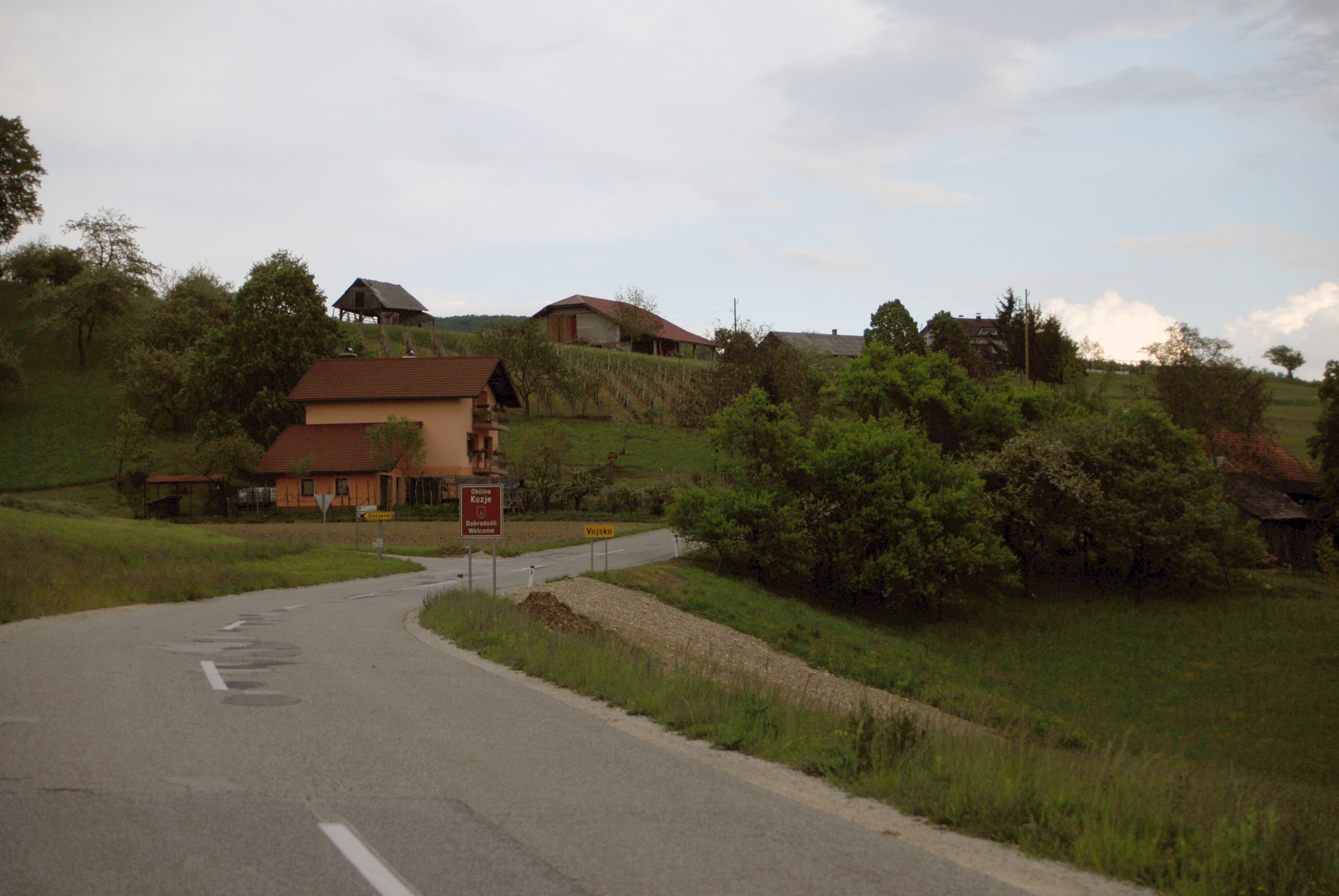

- Location in Slovenia
- Coordinates: 46°1′50.82″N 15°33′1.54″E
- Country: Slovenia
- Traditional region: Styria
- Statistical region: Savinja
- Municipality: Kozje

Area
  - Total: 2.94 km^{2} (1.14 sq mi)
- Elevation: 345 m (1,132 ft)

Population (2002)
  - Total: 94

Vojsko (pronounced [ʋɔi̯ˈskoː]) is a settlement in the Municipality of Kozje in eastern Slovenia. The area is part of the traditional region of Styria. The municipality is now included in the Savinja Statistical Region.
