= Hrastje ob Bistrici =

- Location in Slovenia
- Coordinates: 46°3′45.59″N 15°38′52.6″E
- Country: Slovenia
- Traditional region: Styria
- Statistical region: Lower Sava
- Municipality: Bistrica ob Sotli

Area
  - Total: 2.37 km^{2} (0.92 sq mi)
- Elevation: 198.5 m (651 ft)

Population (2020)
  - Total: 148
  - Density: 62.4/km^{2} (162/sq mi)

Hrastje ob Bistrici (pronounced [ˈxɾaːstjɛ ɔb ˈbiːstɾitsi]) is a settlement in the Municipality of Bistrica ob Sotli in eastern Slovenia. The area is part of the traditional region of Styria. It is now included in the Lower Sava Statistical Region; until January 2014 it was part of the Savinja Statistical Region.

== Name ==
The name of the settlement was changed from Hrastje to Hrastje ob Bistrici (literally, 'Hrastje on the Bistrica River') in 1953. The name Hrastje is derived from the Slovene common noun hrast 'oak', referring to the local vegetation.

== Cultural heritage ==
There is surface evidence and some architectural remains of an Ancient Roman settlement at the area known as Banova Njiva next to the Gorenje factory in the settlement. Although the site has been protected as a national heritage site by the Slovenian Ministry of Culture, it has so far not been investigated in any detail.
