= Zaboršt, Domžale =

Zaboršt
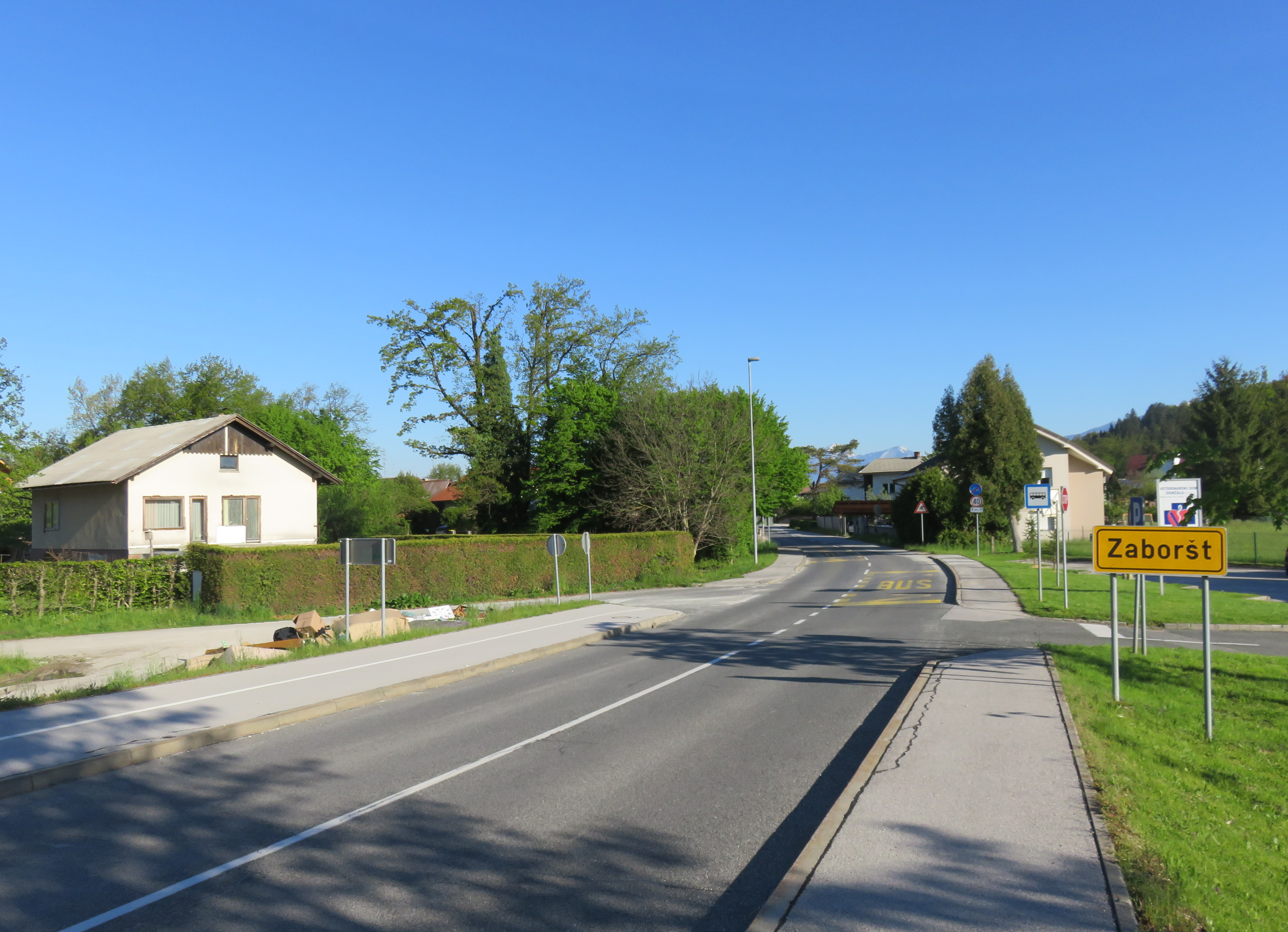

- Location in Slovenia
- Coordinates: 46°8′2.54″N 14°36′42.72″E
- Country: Slovenia
- Traditional region: Upper Carniola
- Statistical region: Central Slovenia
- Municipality: Domžale

Area
  - Total: 1.41 km^{2} (0.54 sq mi)
- Elevation: 294.7 m (967 ft)

Population (2020)
  - Total: 787
  - Density: 558/km^{2} (1,450/sq mi)

Zaboršt (pronounced [zaˈbɔɾʃt]) is a settlement on the left bank of the Kamnik Bistrica River on the outskirts of Domžale in the Upper Carniola region of Slovenia.
