= Zavrh, Trebnje =

Zavrh
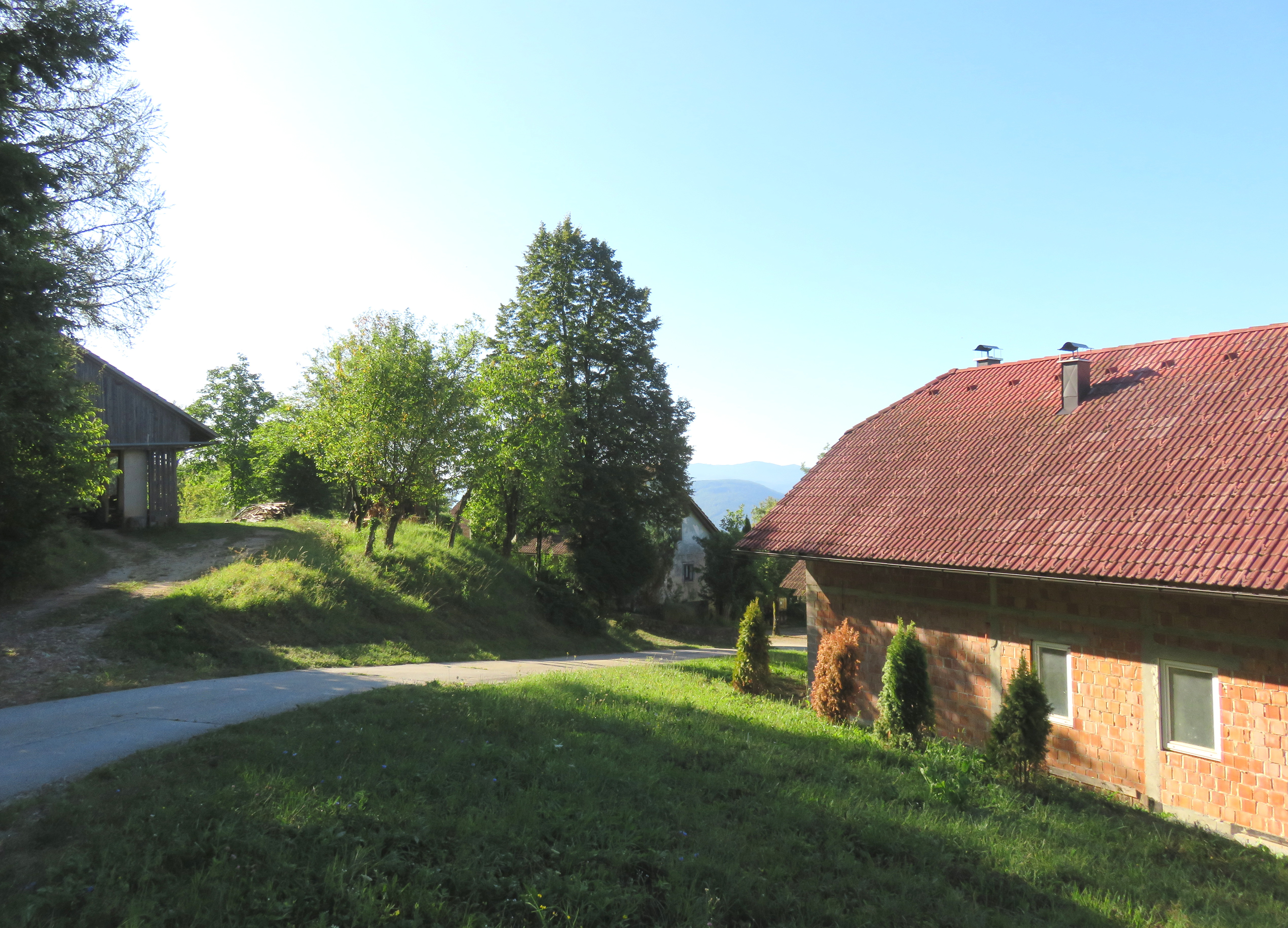

- Location in Slovenia
- Coordinates: 45°52′13.66″N 14°53′8.19″E
- Country: Slovenia
- Traditional region: Lower Carniola
- Statistical region: Southeast Slovenia
- Municipality: Trebnje

Area
  - Total: 1.04 km^{2} (0.40 sq mi)
- Elevation: 432.9 m (1,420 ft)

Population (2002)
  - Total: 5

Zavrh (pronounced [zaˈʋəɾx]) is a small village in the Municipality of Trebnje in eastern Slovenia. It is relatively remote and lies in the hills northwest of Žužemberk and is accessible from Sela pri Šumberku. The area is part of the historical region of Lower Carniola. The municipality is now included in the Southeast Slovenia Statistical Region.
