= Zagorje, Kozje =

Zagorje
- Location in Slovenia
- Coordinates: 46°5′47.25″N 15°29′27.82″E
- Country: Slovenia
- Traditional region: Styria
- Statistical region: Savinja
- Municipality: Kozje

Area
  - Total: 5.67 km^{2} (2.19 sq mi)
- Elevation: 439 m (1,440 ft)

Population (2002)
  - Total: 207

Zagorje (pronounced [ˈzaːɡɔɾjɛ]) is a village in the Municipality of Kozje in eastern Slovenia. It lies in the southern part of the Sava Hills (Slovene: Posavsko hribovje). The area is part of the historical Styria region. The municipality is now included in the Savinja Statistical Region.

The local parish church is dedicated to Mary Help of Christians (Slovene: Marija Pomočnica) and belongs to the Roman Catholic Diocese of Celje. It dates to the 15th century with later reworking in the Baroque style.
