= Zavrh, Litija =

Zavrh
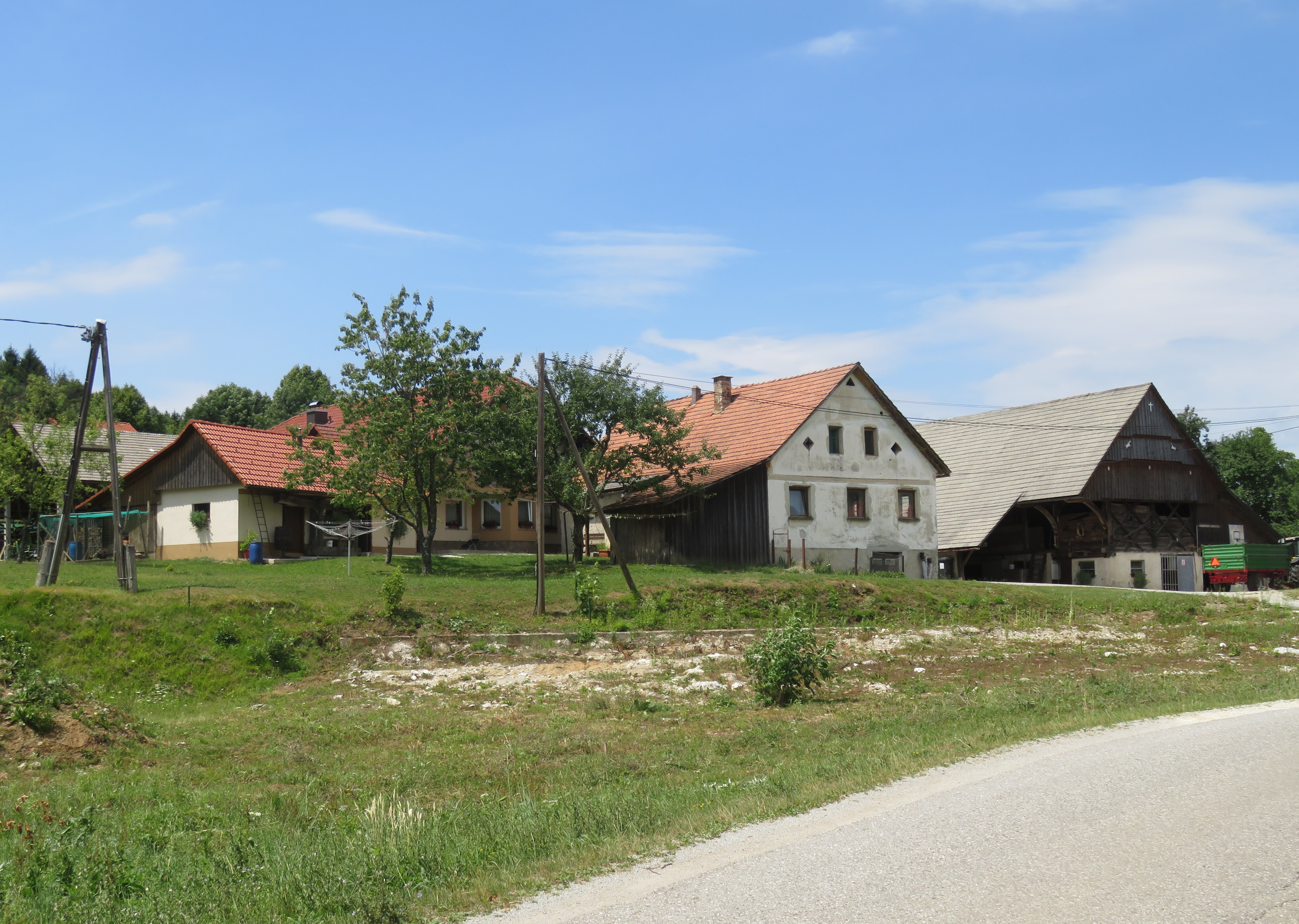

- Location in Slovenia
- Coordinates: 46°3′2.67″N 15°1′20.47″E
- Country: Slovenia
- Traditional region: Lower Carniola
- Statistical region: Central Sava
- Municipality: Litija

Area
  - Total: 2.27 km^{2} (0.88 sq mi)
- Elevation: 730.6 m (2,397 ft)

Population (2002)
  - Total: 26
- Postal code: 1273

Zavrh (pronounced [zaˈʋəɾx]; German: Neudorf) is a settlement north of Dole in the Municipality of Litija in central Slovenia. The area is part of the traditional region of Lower Carniola and is now included with the rest of the municipality in the Central Sava Statistical Region.
