= Zavrh, Lenart =

Zavrh
- Location in Slovenia
- Coordinates: 46°32′22.77″N 15°50′3.09″E
- Country: Slovenia
- Traditional region: Styria
- Statistical region: Drava
- Municipality: Lenart

Area
  - Total: 1.34 km^{2} (0.52 sq mi)
- Elevation: 343.3 m (1,126 ft)

Population (2002)
  - Total: 320

Zavrh (pronounced [ˈzaːʋəɾx], German: Sauerberg [ˈzaʊ̯ɐbɛɐ̯k]) is a settlement in the Municipality of Lenart in northeastern Slovenia. It lies in the Slovene Hills (Slovene: Slovenske gorice) above the valley of the Pesnica River The area is part of the traditional region of Styria. It is now included in the Drava Statistical Region.

In a house in the village where the Slovene general Rudolf Maister occasionally stayed a memorial room was set up in 1986. There is also a 17 m high observation tower known as Maister's Observation Tower (Slovene: Maistrov razgledni stolp) in the settlement. It is a metal structure erected in 1982 to replace an earlier wooden structure based on plans by Maister's son Borut from 1963.
