= Znojile, Zagorje ob Savi =

Znojile
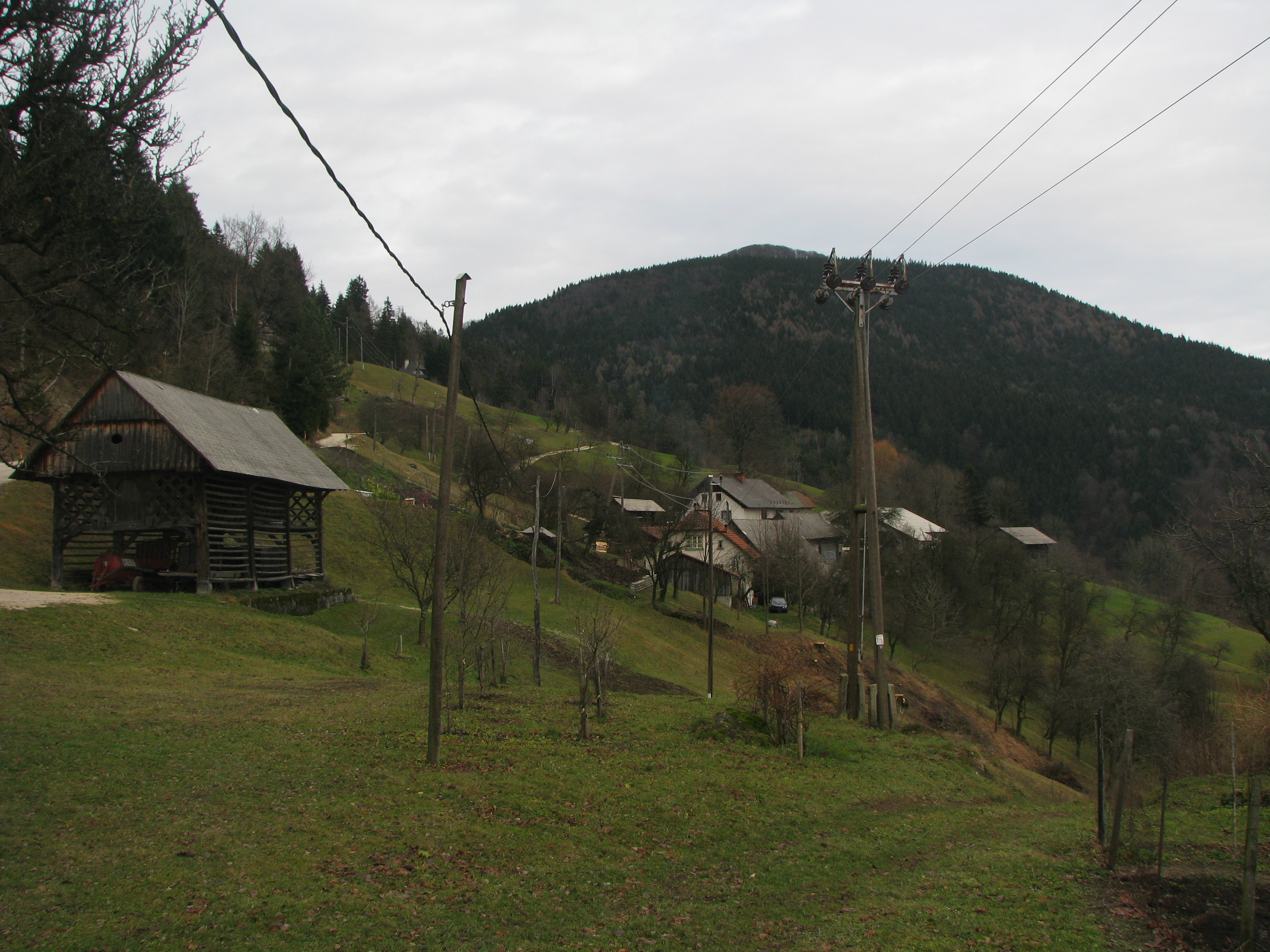

- Location in Slovenia
- Coordinates: 46°10′39.39″N 14°59′11.04″E
- Country: Slovenia
- Traditional region: Upper Carniola
- Statistical region: Central Sava
- Municipality: Zagorje ob Savi

Area
  - Total: 5.3 km^{2} (2.0 sq mi)
- Elevation: 513.7 m (1,685 ft)

Population (2002)
  - Total: 144
- Postal code: 1413

Znojile (pronounced [znɔˈjiːlɛ]) is a settlement in the hills north of the Zagorje ob Savi in central Slovenia. The area is part of the traditional region of Upper Carniola. It is now included with the rest of the Municipality of Zagorje ob Savi in the Central Sava Statistical Region.

== Name ==
The name Znojile is derived from *znoji(d)lo 'sunny or sun-facing area' from the verb *znojiti 'to be warmed by the sun'. The name therefore refers to the geographical orientation of the place.

== Church ==
The local church, built on a hill northeast of the settlement, is dedicated to Saint Leonard. It is a Gothic building that was restyled in the Baroque in the mid-18th century.
