= Zavrh, Bloke =

Zavrh
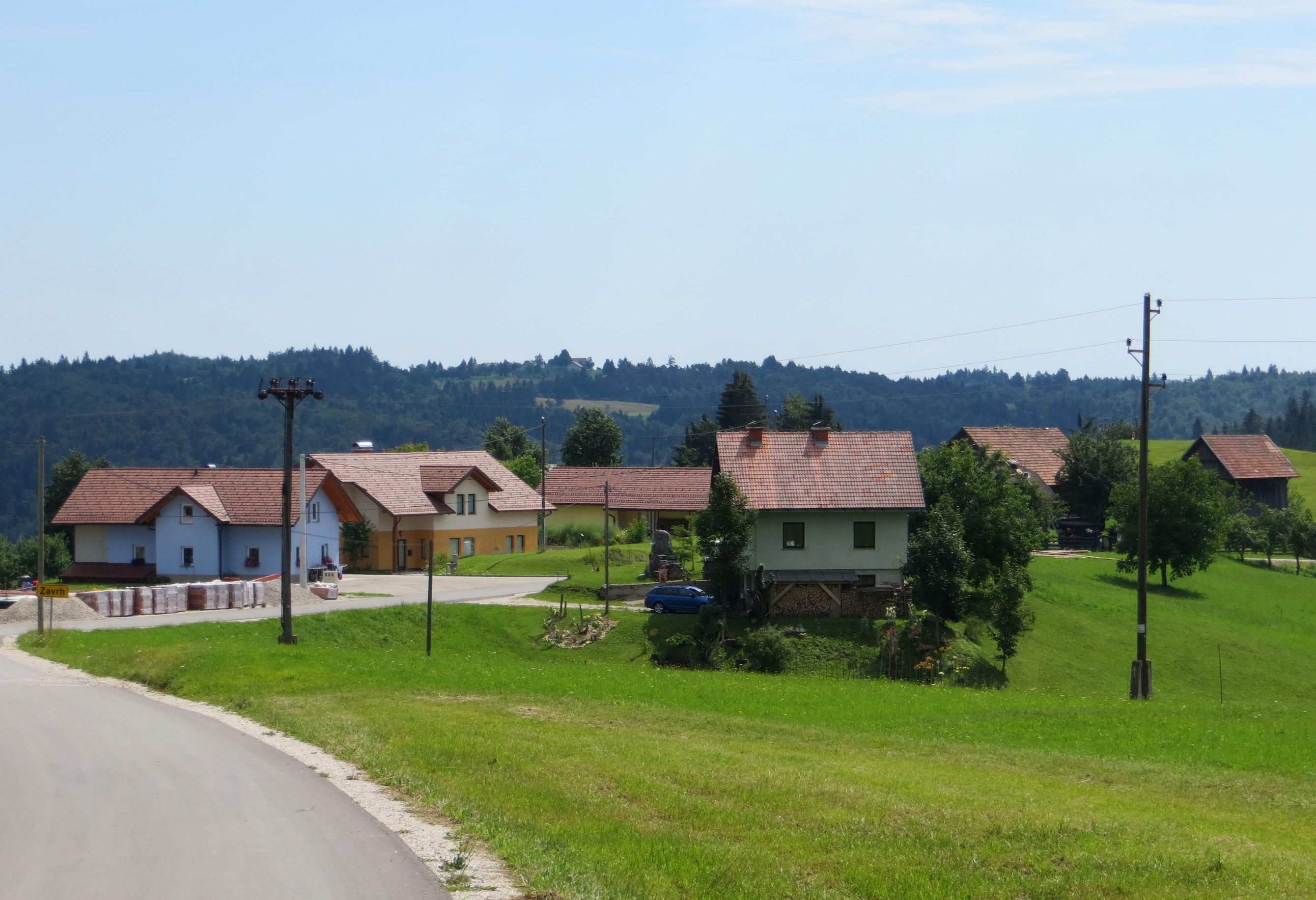

- Location in Slovenia
- Coordinates: 45°49′42.59″N 14°30′4.91″E
- Country: Slovenia
- Traditional region: Inner Carniola
- Statistical region: Littoral–Inner Carniola
- Municipality: Bloke

Area
  - Total: 2.97 km^{2} (1.15 sq mi)
- Elevation: 800.7 m (2,627 ft)

Population (2020)
  - Total: 16
  - Density: 5.4/km^{2} (14/sq mi)

Zavrh (pronounced [zaˈʋəɾx]) is a remote dispersed settlement north of Ravnik in the Municipality of Bloke in the Inner Carniola region of Slovenia.
