= Buče, Kozje =

Buče Fautsch
- Location in Slovenia
- Coordinates: 46°6′15.35″N 15°34′30.33″E
- Country: Slovenia
- Traditional region: Styria
- Statistical region: Savinja
- Municipality: Kozje

Area
  - Total: 2.46 km^{2} (0.95 sq mi)
- Elevation: 250.8 m (823 ft)

Population (2002)
  - Total: 145

Buče (pronounced [ˈbuːtʃɛ], German: Fautsch) is a settlement in the Municipality of Kozje in eastern Slovenia. It lies in the Sava Hills (Slovene: Posavsko hribovje) northeast of Kozje. The area is part of the historical Styria region. The municipality is now included in the Savinja Statistical Region.

The Buče parish church, built on the southeastern edge of the settlement, is dedicated to Saint Peter and belongs to the Roman Catholic Diocese of Celje. The current building dates to the 18th century, although a church on this site is mentioned in written documents dating to 1545.

The site of a Roman villa rustica has been partially excavated in the hamlet of Groblje in the settlement.
