= Podsreda =

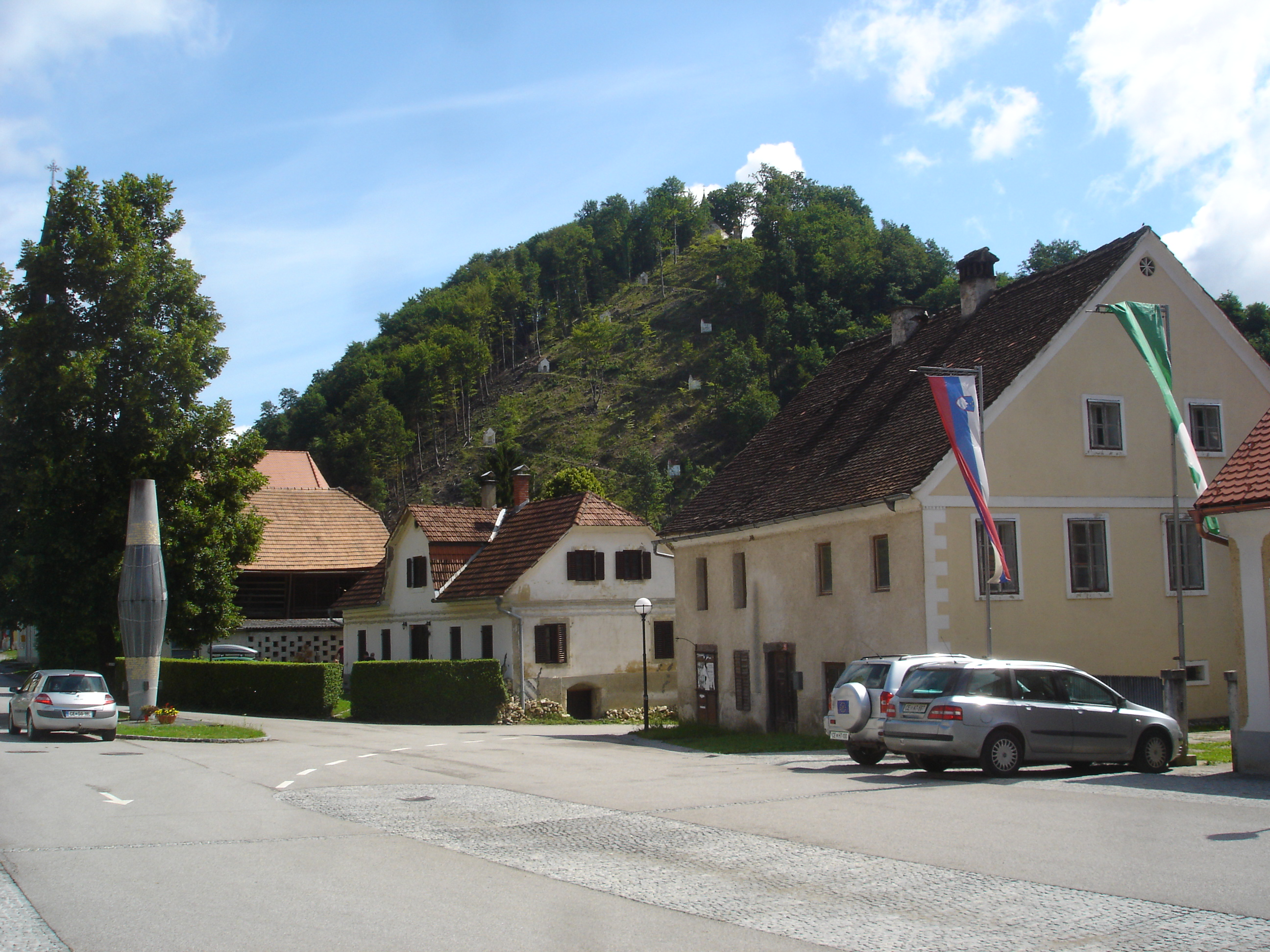
- Podsreda

- Location in Slovenia
- Coordinates: 46°2′22.5″N 15°35′23.35″E
- Country: Slovenia
- Traditional region: Styria
- Statistical region: Savinja
- Municipality: Kozje

Area
  - Total: 9.24 km^{2} (3.57 sq mi)
- Elevation: 245.5 m (805 ft)

Population (2002)
  - Total: 206

Podsreda (pronounced [pɔˈtsɾeːda]; German: Hörberg) is a village in the Municipality of Kozje in eastern Slovenia. It is located near the Croatian border, in the traditional region of Styria. It is known for its market, which takes place every Sunday, and for Podsreda Castle, located above the village itself.

The parish church in the settlement is dedicated to John the Baptist and belongs to the Roman Catholic Diocese of Celje. It was built between 1802 and 1810.

Podsreda Castle is a castle south of the main settlement. It dates to around 1150 and is probably the best-preserved example of secular Romanesque architecture in Slovenia. It features a typical 12th-century defensive tower (keep), a Romanesque chapel, and two wings from about the same period. The orderly, rectangular plan is also typical of the late Romanesque period.

== People ==
Marija Javeršek (1864–1918), the mother of the Yugoslav communist leader Josip Broz Tito, was from Podsreda. Tito spent part of his childhood in Podsreda with his maternal grandparents.
