= Pilštanj =

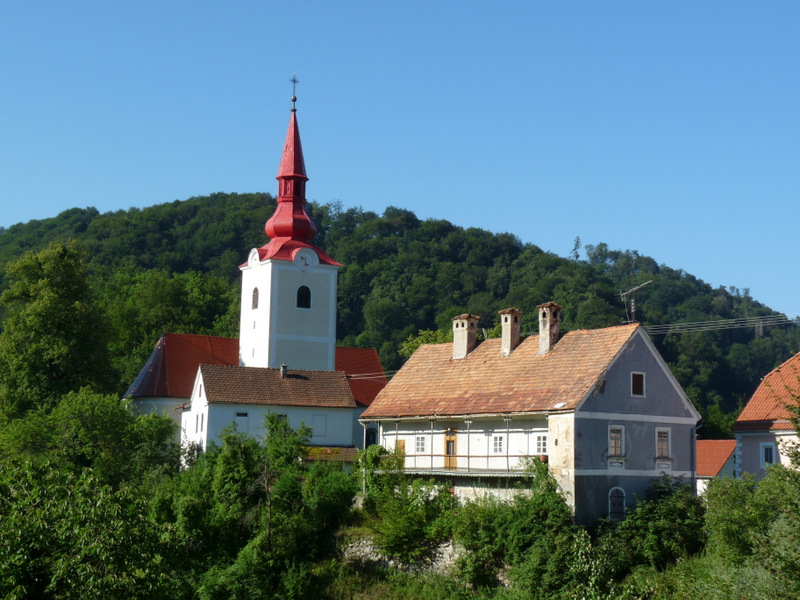

- Location in Slovenia
- Coordinates: 46°6′0.34″N 15°31′31.37″E
- Country: Slovenia
- Traditional region: Styria
- Statistical region: Savinja
- Municipality: Kozje

Area
  - Total: 2.46 km^{2} (0.95 sq mi)
- Elevation: 376.9 m (1,237 ft)

Population (2002)
  - Total: 127

Pilštanj (pronounced [ˈpiːlʃtan], German: Peilenstein) is a village in the Municipality of Kozje in eastern Slovenia. The area is part of the historical Styria region. The municipality is included in the Savinja Statistical Region.

The parish church in the settlement is dedicated to Saint Michael and belongs to the Roman Catholic Diocese of Celje. It was first mentioned in written documents dating to 1167. The current church was built in the 15th century and redone in Baroque style in the 18th century.

There are ruins of two castles near the settlement. Pilštanj Castle (Germ. Peilenstein) on a steep hill south of the settlement is mentioned in a number of documents dating to the 11th century. It was abandoned by the late 17th century. Hartenštajn Castle (Germ. Hartenstein), of which very few ruins remain, was a 13th-century castle northwest of the settlement.
