= Bločice Karst Field =

Coordinates: 45°45′38″N 14°27′8″E

The Bločice Karst Field (pronounced [ˈbloːtʃitsɛ]; Slovene: Bločiško polje) is a dry karst field in Inner Carniola.

== Geography ==
The Bločice Karst Field lies near the village of Bločice, east of the Cerknica Karst Field, west of the village of Bloška Polica, and south of the Bloke Plateau. Several karst springs are located on the east side of the karst field, and Cold Cave (Slovene: Mrzla jama) is located at the southern edge. Cold Cave is one of only three known habitats in Slovenia of the vulnerable freshwater snail Belgrandiella globulosa. The catchment area of the karst field belongs to the Bloke Plateau.

The Bločice Karst Field has a patchwork cultural landscape of alternating tilled fields and pastures, orchards, and isolated trees, with a clear forested margin. It has been registered as cultural heritage and new construction in the karst field is prohibited.
