= Matilda Tomšič Sebenikar =

Slovenian innkeeper and writer (1847–1933)

Matilda Tomšič Sebenikar – Desimira
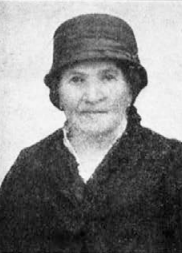
- Matilda Tomšič Sebenikar in 1920s
- Born: Matilda Tomšič; 13 February 1847; Trebnje, Slovenia
- Died: 12 September 1933 (aged 86); Unec, Slovenia
- Occupations: Innkeeper, poet, writer, national activist
- Relatives: Rudolf Maister (nephew)

Matilda Tomšič Sebenikar, also known under the pseudonym Desimira, (13 February 1847 – 12 September 1933) was a Slovenian innkeeper, poet, writer and national activist. She was one of the first Slovenian children literature writers.

== Early life ==
She was born on 13 February 1847 in a Slovenian family in Trebnje. Her mother was innkeeper Frančiška Novak, and her father was teacher and inn owner Matija Tomšič. Among her siblings was the teacher and politician Emanuel Tomšič (1824–1881). From her father's first marriage she also had a half-brother, Bernard Tomšič (1811–1856), a teacher and writer. Her father died when she was three years old.

== Career ==
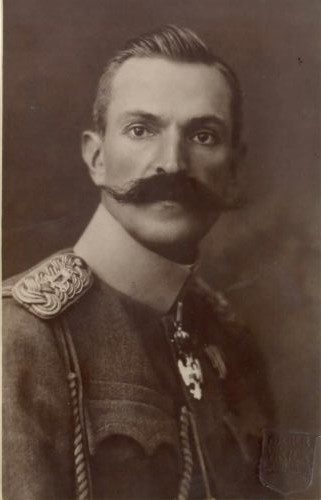
Her nephew, general and poet Rudolf Maister

After schooling she began working in the family inn, where she learned the inn trade. On 17 November 1875 she married the postmaster Lovro Sebenikar from Zabreznica, who was stationed in Rakek. Soon after their wedding they opened an inn in Rakek, which she managed for almost three decades. She successfully renovated it into a large restaurant, noted for good food she prepared herself.

In 1876 their only son, Adolf, was born. He died at the age of seven. In 1887 her widowed sister moved in with her children, among them Rudolf Maister, later general and poet. Matilda and her husband financed his education.

In 1903 she and her husband retired. They sold the house and inn in Rakek and purchased a large property with a former toll house and school at Unec, where they settled.

== Literary activity ==
She began writing at a young age. She wrote poems, stories, and novellas, but also word games. Her poems are mostly narrative and humorous in character. She also wrote several ballads. She published her works under the pseudonym Desimira. Her first publications were in 1871 in the youth magazine Vrtec (1871–1944) in Ljubljana, one of first newspapers for children in Slovenian, founded by the teacher and writer Ivan Tomšič, son of her half-brother Bernard. Later she published in the Trieste newspaper Slovenka, in the children's magazine Zvonček, the Trieste newspaper Edinost, and the literary journal Dom in svet. She published over several decades. She was one of the most important contributors to the first Slovene women's newspaper Slovenka. In 2025 a selected volume of her works was published: Naj besede povedo: izbor po revijah in časnikih objavljenih del Matilde Sebenikar – Desimire (Let the Words Speak: A Selection of Works by Matilda Sebenikar – Desimira Published in Magazines and Newspapers).

== National work ==
She was very active in the Society of Sts. Cyril and Methodius, a private, supra-party national-defense and educational organization. Due to her efforts, in January 1896 a local branch covering Rakek, Cerknica, and Planina was founded. She served as its first president. Later she served as its treasurer. She also supported Slovenian students in Vienna. In 1911 she and her husband were among the founding members of the fire brigade in Unec.

== Later life and death ==
In 1923 she gifted the estate in Unec to Rudolf Maister's sons, Hrvoje and Borut Maister. After his retirement, Rudolf Maister spent every summer with her in Unec, where in 1934, one year after her death, he also died. She died on 12 September 1933 in Unec.

== Bibliography ==
- Naj besede povedo: izbor po revijah in časnikih objavljenih del Matilde Sebenikar – Desimire (selected works; published in 2025 by the Notranjska Patriotic Society General Maister and the Jože Udovič Library, Cerknica)
