= Rakov Škocjan =

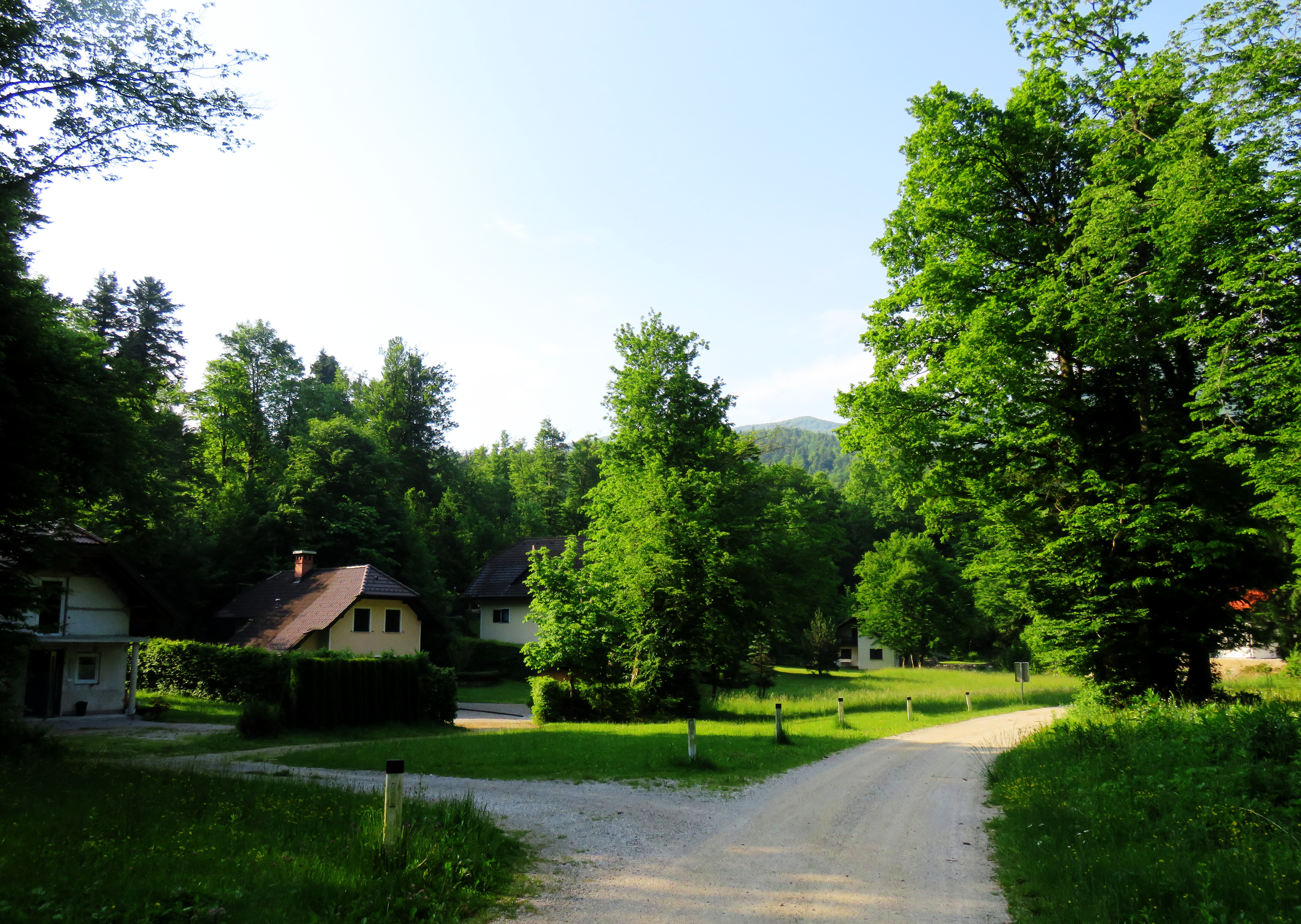

- Location in Slovenia
- Coordinates: 45°47′51.94″N 14°17′13.9″E
- Country: Slovenia
- Traditional region: Inner Carniola
- Statistical region: Littoral–Inner Carniola
- Municipality: Cerknica

Area
  - Total: 19.01 km^{2} (7.34 sq mi)
- Elevation: 532.6 m (1,747 ft)

Population (2020)
  - Total: 10
  - Density: 0.53/km^{2} (1.4/sq mi)

Rakov Škocjan (pronounced [ˈɾaːkɔu̯ ʃkɔˈtsjaːn]) is a settlement south of Rakek in the Municipality of Cerknica in the Inner Carniola region of Slovenia. The surrounding area of the Rak Škocjan Valley is a regional nature reserve known as Rak Škocjan Park.

== Name ==
The name Rakov Škocjan literally means 'Škocjan on Rak Creek'. Like other settlements named Škocjan, the name is a contraction of *šent Kǫcьjanъ 'Saint Cantianus', referring to the patron saint of the local church. The ruins of Saint Cantianus' Church are located above Big Natural Bridge (Slovene: Veliki Naravni most) in Rak Škocjan Park.

== History ==
The area is an Iron Age archaeological site.

In the early 17th century, St. Cantianus's Church was built above the Rakov Škocjan Valley in the late Gothic style. Only ruins have been preserved until today.

An inn offering accommodation and a number of vacation houses were built in what is now Rakov Škocjan in 1963.

The settlement of Rakov Škocjan was formally established in 1988, when its territory was separated from the settlement of Slivice.
