= Bločice =

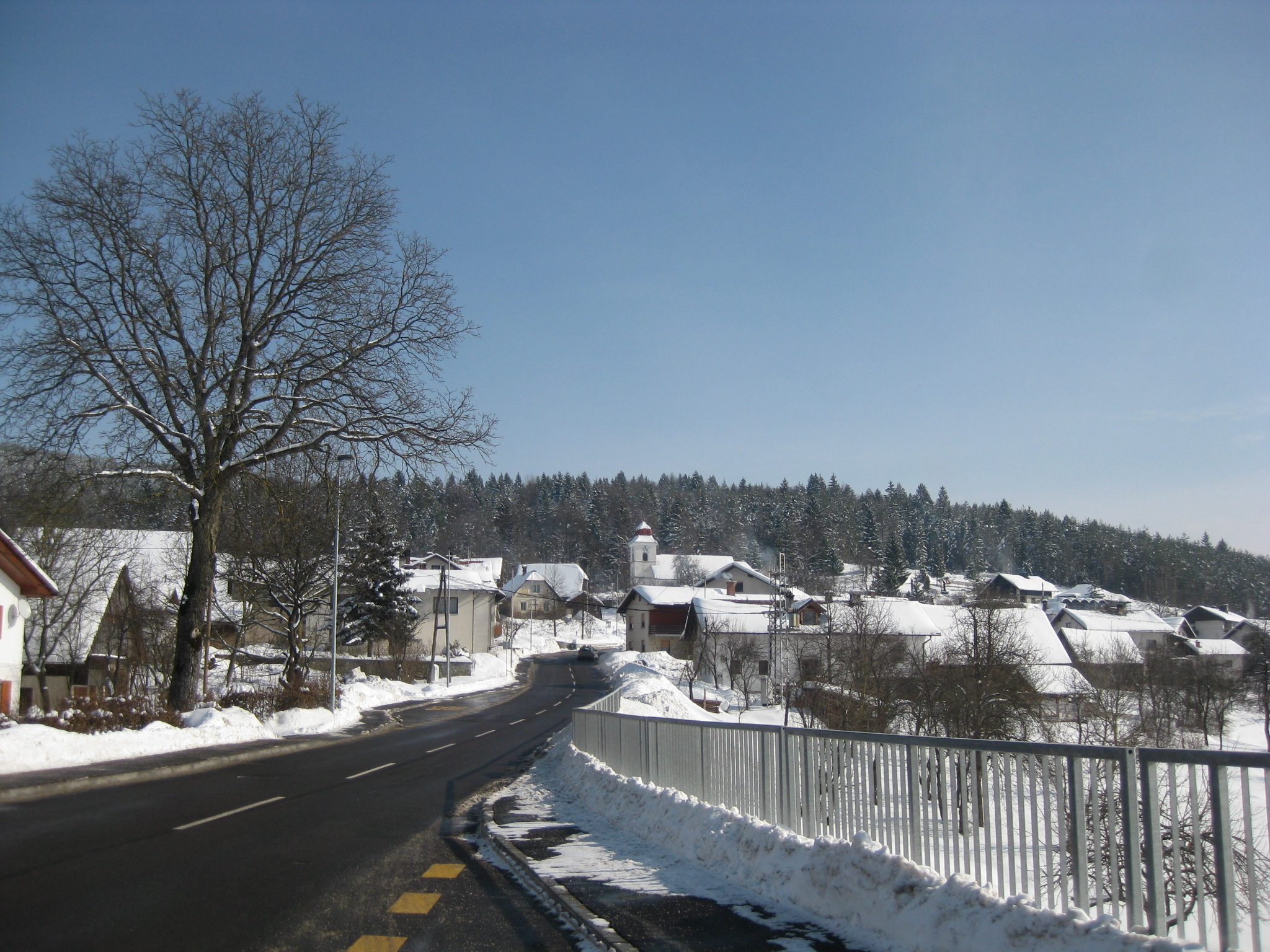

- Location in Slovenia
- Coordinates: 45°45′49.23″N 14°27′14.35″E
- Country: Slovenia
- Traditional region: Inner Carniola
- Statistical region: Littoral–Inner Carniola
- Municipality: Cerknica

Area
  - Total: 4.32 km^{2} (1.67 sq mi)
- Elevation: 622.5 m (2,042 ft)

Population (2020)
  - Total: 108
  - Density: 25.0/km^{2} (64.7/sq mi)

Bločice (pronounced [ˈbloːtʃitsɛ], in older sources also Obločice, German: Obloschitz) is a village east of Grahovo in the Municipality of Cerknica in the Inner Carniola region of Slovenia.

== Name ==
Bločice was attested in written sources in 1397 as Oblaczicz, among other spellings. It is a diminutive of the regional name *Obloke (which developed into Bloke), which is probably derived from the prepositional phrase *ob(ь) lǫky or *ob(ь) lǫkaxъ 'next to the flood-meadow(s)'. Originally the name therefore means 'little Bloke' (cf. also Male Bloke, literally 'little Bloke', and Velike Bloke, literally 'big Bloke'). In the past it was known as Obločice in Slovene and Obloschitz in German.

== Church ==
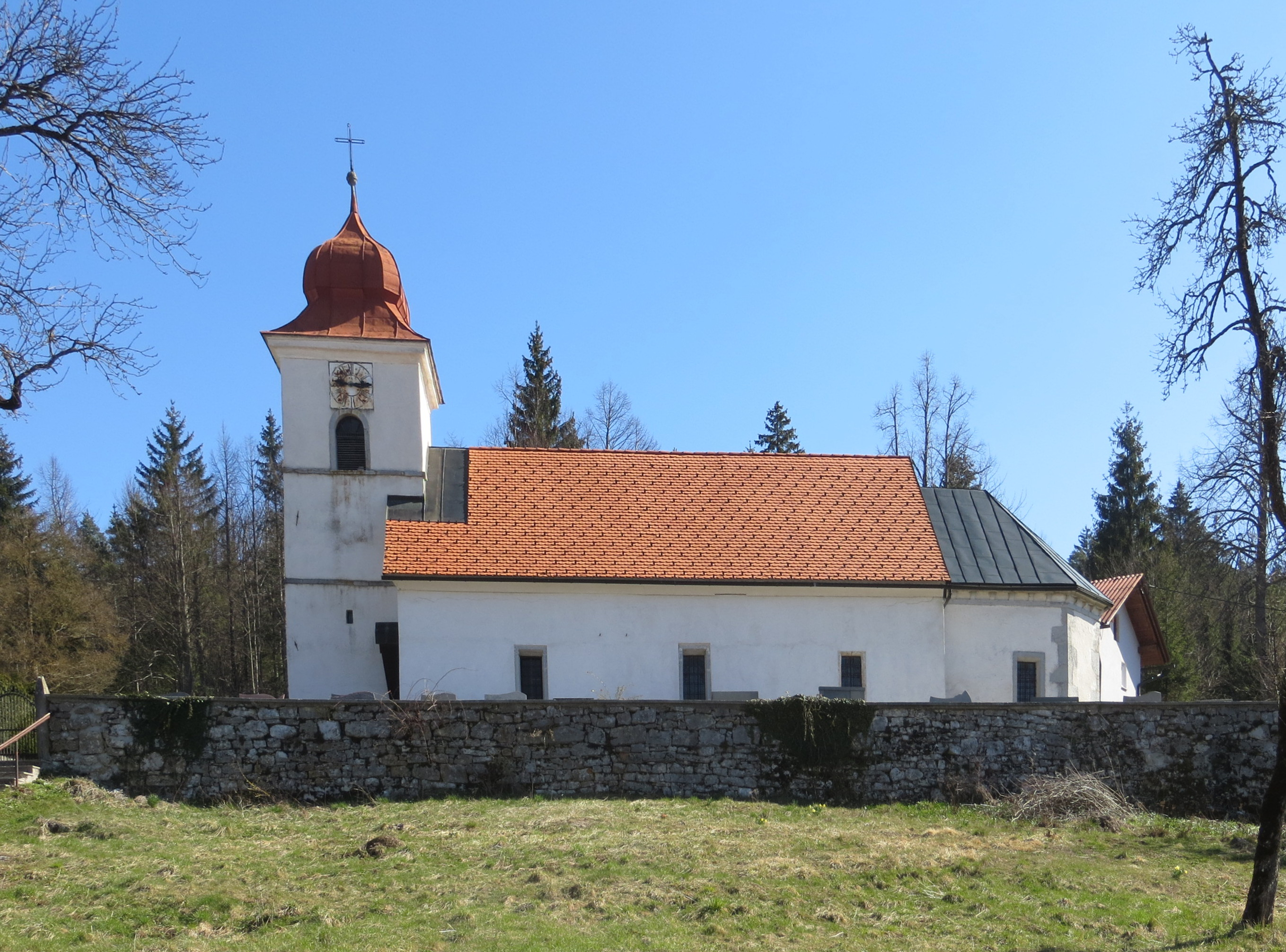
Saint Primus and Felician Church

The local church in the settlement is dedicated to Saints Primus and Felician and belongs to the Parish of Grahovo. It was first mentioned in written documents dating to 1397 and its interior preserves some mid- to late-15th century frescos. The main altar dates to 1672.
