= Ravnik, Bloke =

Ravnik
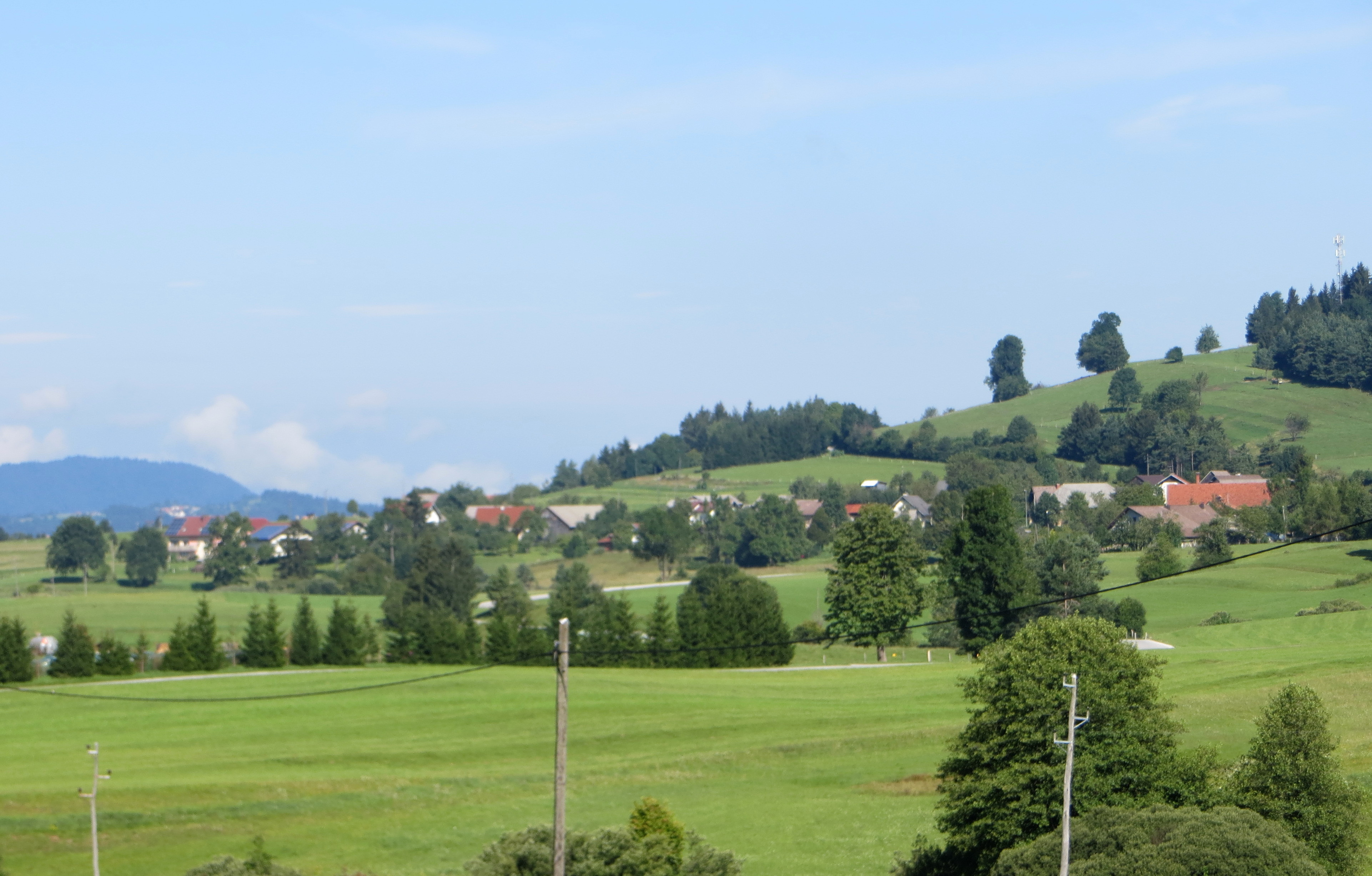

- Location in Slovenia
- Coordinates: 45°48′19.44″N 14°30′27.42″E
- Country: Slovenia
- Traditional region: Inner Carniola
- Statistical region: Littoral–Inner Carniola
- Municipality: Bloke

Area
  - Total: 1.53 km^{2} (0.59 sq mi)
- Elevation: 762.5 m (2,502 ft)

Population (2020)
  - Total: 37
  - Density: 24/km^{2} (63/sq mi)

Ravnik (pronounced [ˈɾaːu̯nik], German: Raunik) is a village north of Nova Vas in the Municipality of Bloke in the Inner Carniola region of Slovenia.

== Church ==
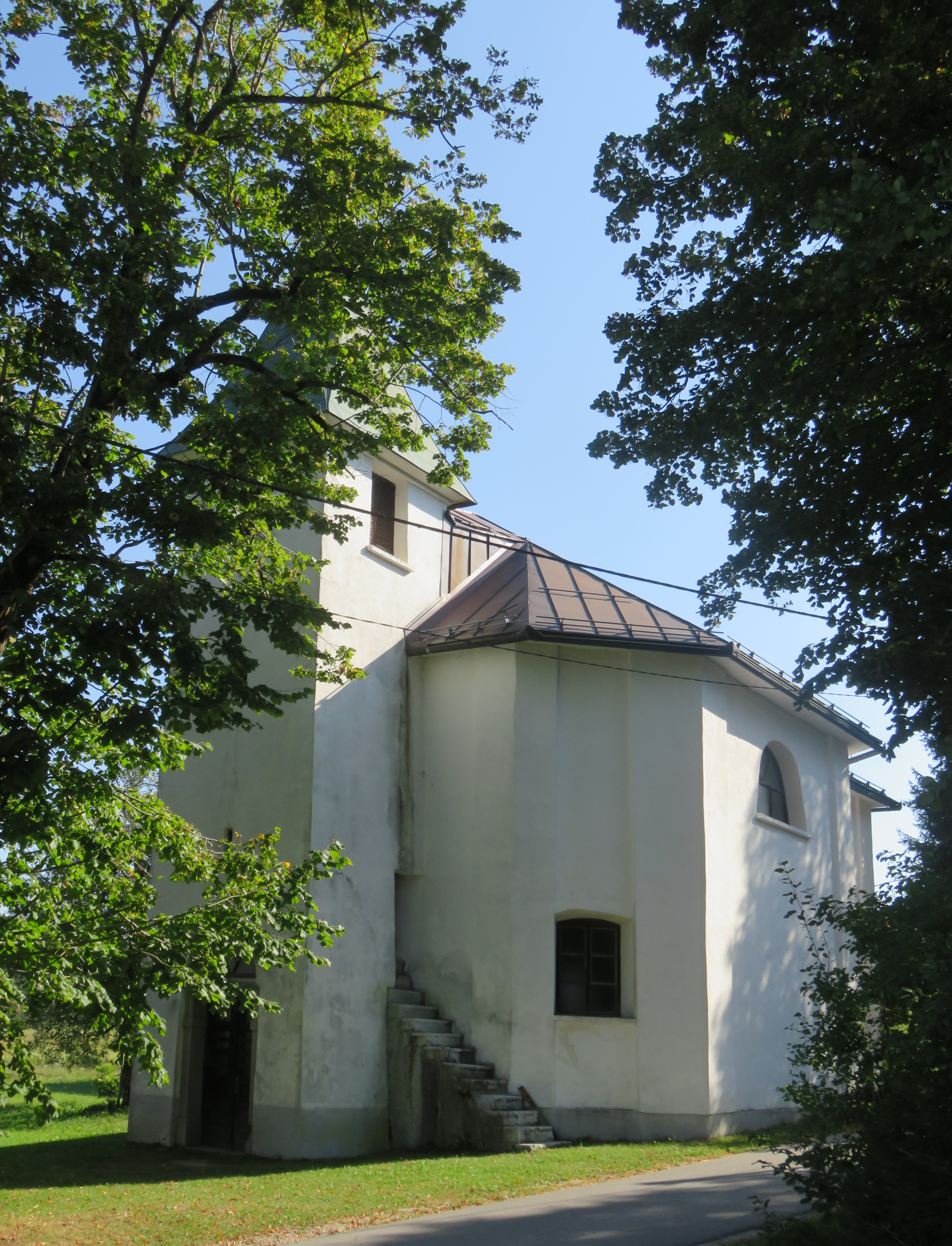
Saint Roch's Church

The local church in the settlement is dedicated to Saint Roch and belongs to the Parish of Bloke.
