= Planina, Postojna =

Planina

- Location in Slovenia
- Coordinates: 45°49′49.38″N 14°15′9.61″E
- Country: Slovenia
- Traditional region: Inner Carniola
- Statistical region: Littoral–Inner Carniola
- Municipality: Postojna

Area
  - Total: 36.56 km^{2} (14.12 sq mi)
- Elevation: 453.3 m (1,487 ft)

Population (2002)
  - Total: 647

Planina (pronounced [plaˈnìːna]) is a village in the Municipality of Postojna in the Inner Carniola region of Slovenia.

== Geography ==
Planina includes the hamlets of Gornja Planina (in older sources Gorenja Planina, German: Oberplanina), Dolnja Planina (in older sources Dolenja Planina, German: Unterplanina), and Grič in the main settlement; Pod Gradom (German: Kleinhäusel) and Kačja Vas (or Kačje Ride) to the southwest; and Malni (in older sources Malini, German: Mühlthal) and Hasberg (in older sources Planinski Grad, German: Haasberg) to the south. The hamlet of Mačkovec (a.k.a. Planinski vrh, German: Planiner Anhöhe), formerly considered to belong to Planina, is now part of neighboring Postojna.

== Name ==
Planina was attested in written sources in 1300 as Mounç in foro (and as Renç miles de Albinus in 1321, czu der Alben in 1333, and pey der Albn in 1341). The Slovenian name of the settlement is derived from the common noun planina 'treeless mountain; mountain pasture', referring to the local geography and semantically corresponding to Middle High German albe in the medieval attestations of the name. Especially in older sources, the casual name variant Planina pri Rakeku (i.e., 'Planina near Rakek') is occasionally found, distinguishing the settlement from others named Planina.

== History ==
The Planina area was already settled in prehistoric times, along a trade route from Šmihel pod Nanosom to Vrhnika. The hill with ruins of Haasberg Castle has the remains of prehistoric and Roman-era fortifications, and graves dating to the Bronze Age and Roman era have been excavated on a hill slope closer to Unec. Medieval Planina developed around a castle belonging to the lords of Alben (Slovene: albenski gospodje). A toll house belonging to the Counts of Gorizia was attested in Planina in 1217. As a town, Planina was granted the right to a market day every Saturday and an annual fair on Saint Margaret's Day. The town was later under the control of the Haller and Eggenberg noble families. By the 17th century, Planina had developed into an important trade connection between Carniola and the Adriatic, with routes connecting it to Pivka, Cerknica, and Logatec. A major postal station was established in Planina in 1728, and a road to Trieste was laid through the town in 1830.

In the early 19th century an amadou factory was established in Planina and it exported its products throughout Europe. A district court was established in Planina in 1867 (and transferred to Logatec in 1875). After the First World War, the Treaty of Rapallo split the town: the hamlet of Kačja Vas, the source of the Unica River (at the mouth of Planina Cave), the Ravbar Tower of Little Castle, and Hošperk Castle (Haasberg) lay on the Italian side of the border.

During the Second World War, the Partisan Dolomite Detachment was active in the area. The Partisans destroyed an Italian outpost near Planina on 17 May 1943, and then burned Haasberg Castle on 27 March 1944, resulting in the loss of all the castle's furnishings. The Partisans also burned the Windischgrätz archive and destroyed the nearby family crypt and castle park.

=== Mass grave ===
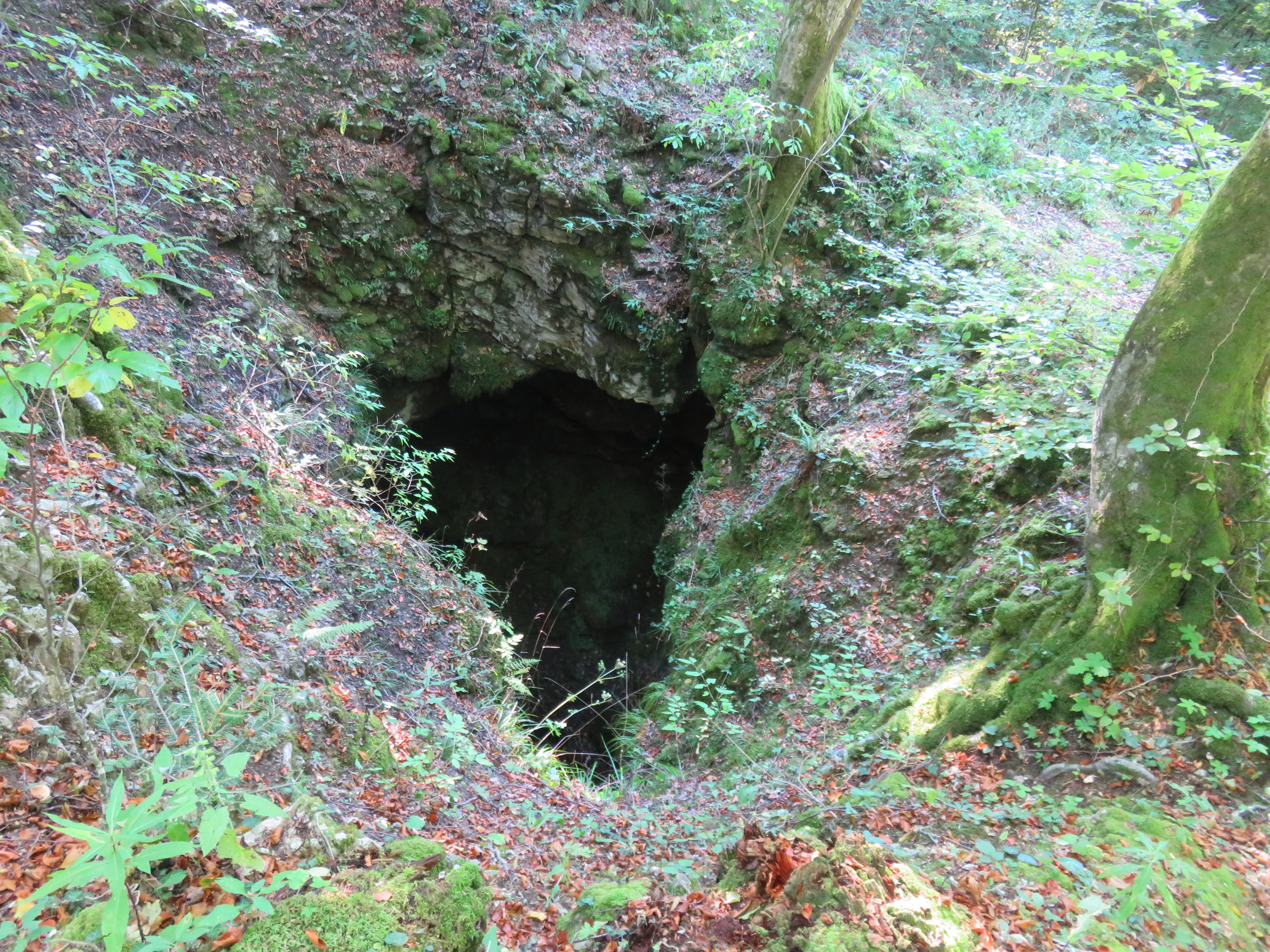
The Liplje Cave Mass Grave

Planina is the site of a mass grave associated with the Second World War. The Liplje Cave Mass Grave (Slovene: Grobišče Lipeljska jama) is located on the slope of Mount Planina (Planinska gora), northeast of the peak. It contains the remains of undetermined victims based on skeletal remains discovered by spelunkers.

== Churches ==
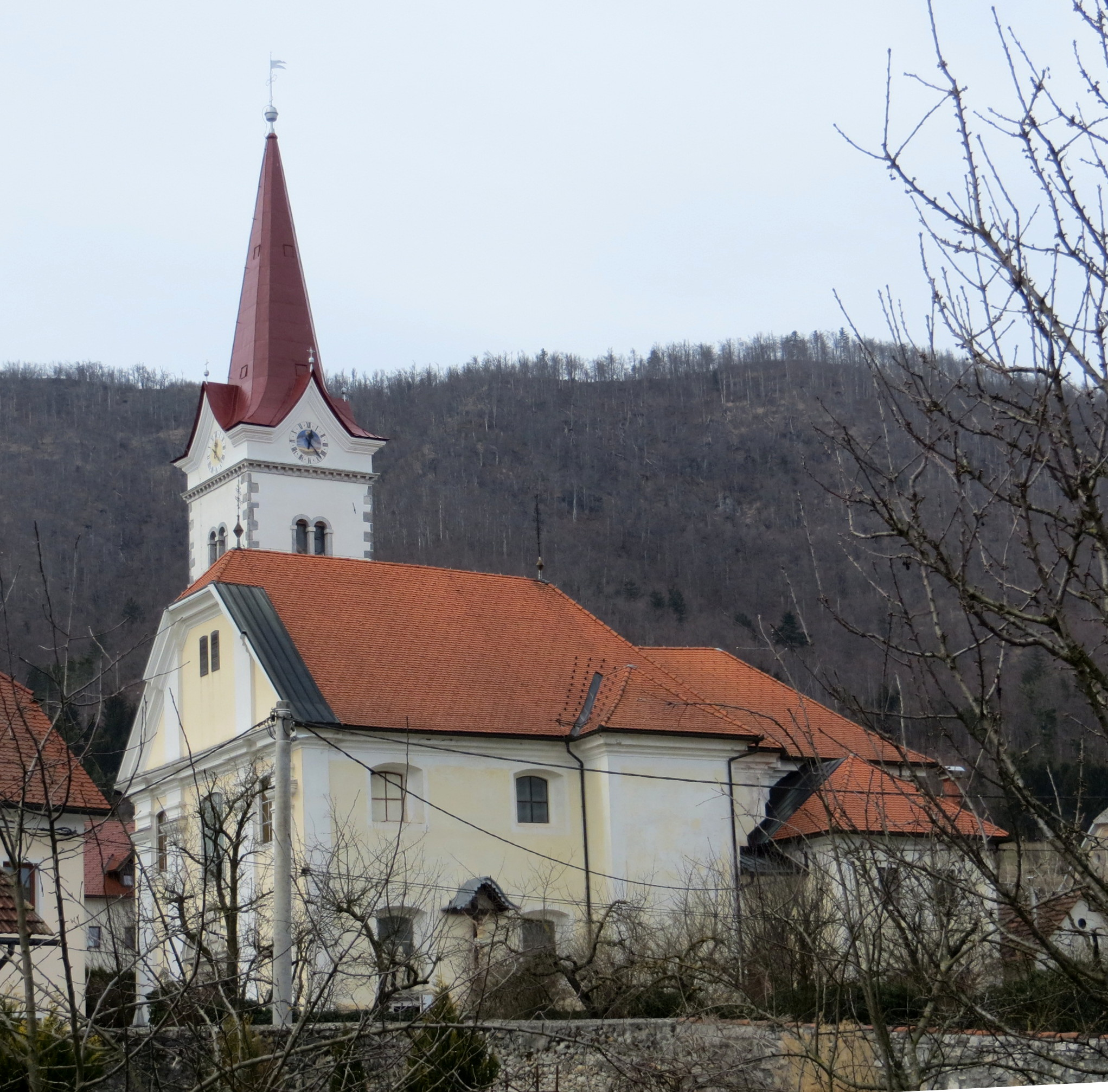
Saint Margaret's Church

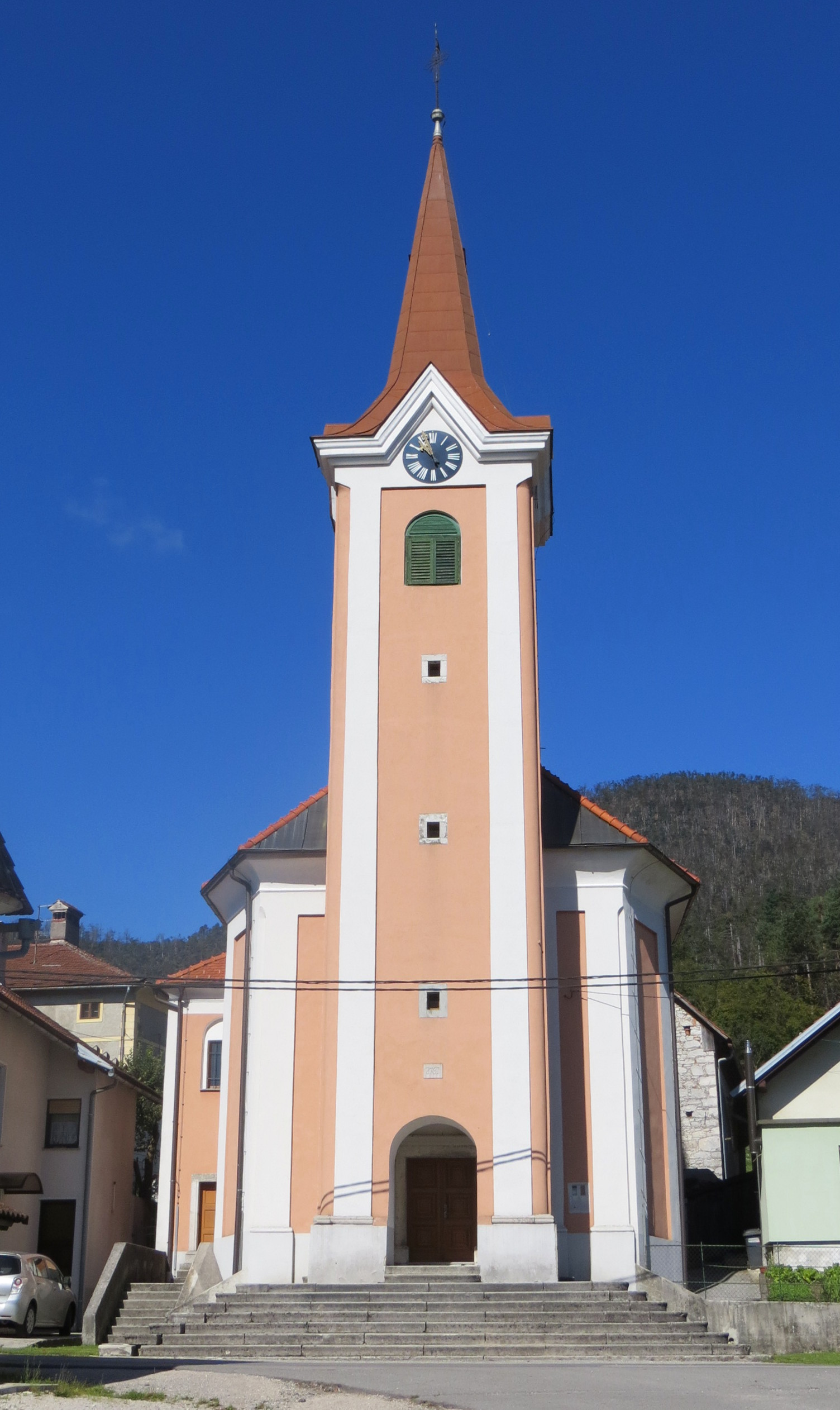
Saint Roch's Church

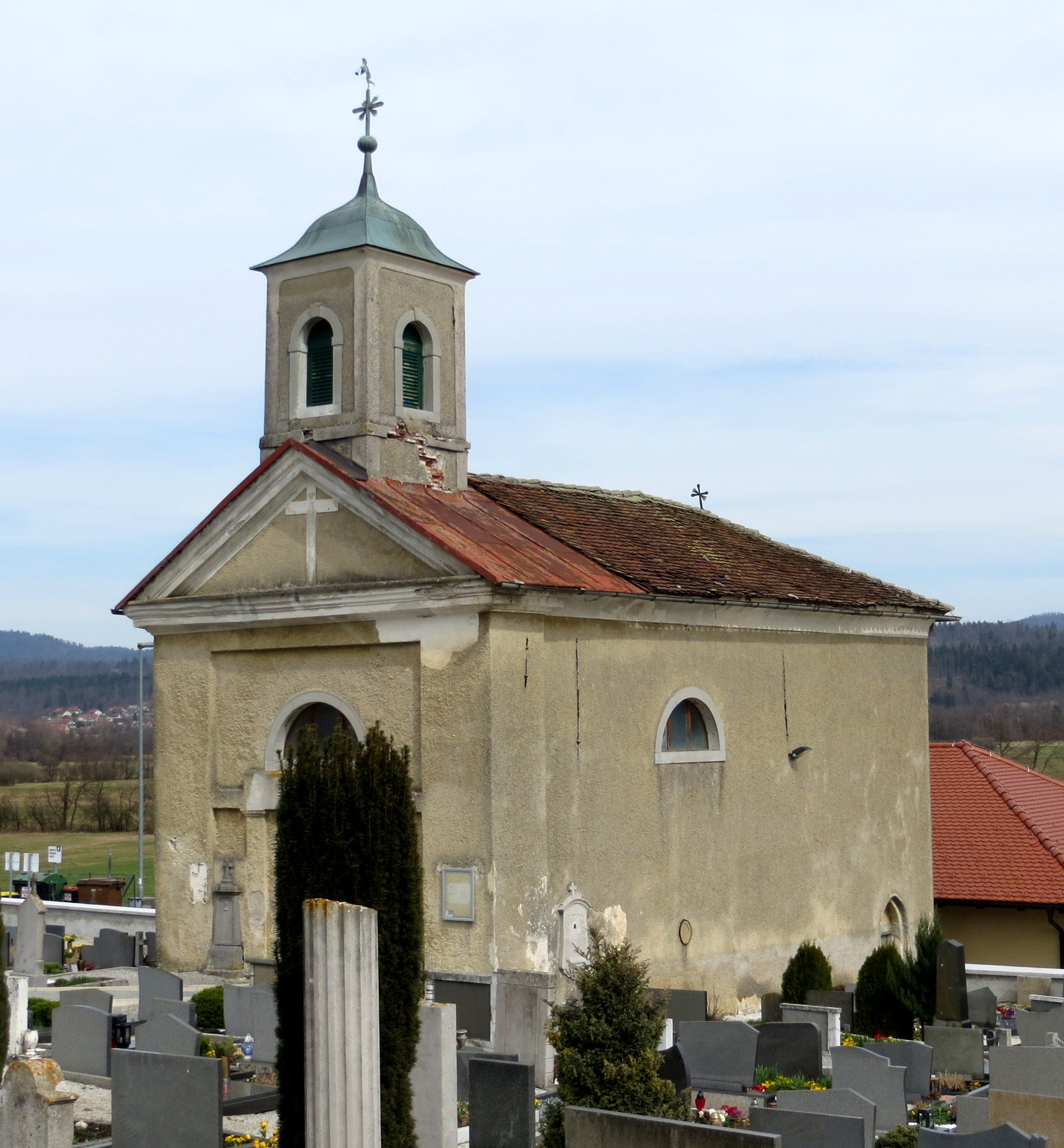
Holy Cross Church

Churches in Planina

The parish church in the settlement is dedicated to Saint Margaret and belongs to the Ljubljana Archdiocese. It is a Baroque church that was built at the site of an older predecessor in 1771. Another church stands in Gornja Planina and is dedicated to Saint Roch. It was built in the Baroque style in 1763. The chancel was painted in 1852 by Franz Kurz zum Thurn und Goldenstein. There are a number of churches near the village belonging to the same parish. Holy Cross Church is built next to the cemetery north of the village. A church dedicated to Mary Refuge of Sinners stands on a hill northwest of the village.

== Notable people ==
Notable people that were born or lived in Planina include:

- Mire Cetin (1922–2016), painter
- Oskar Dev (1868–1932), poet and composer
- Josip Gabrovšek (1867–1894), children's writer
- Franc Kočevar von Kondenheim (1833–1897), lawyer
- Franc Koren (1898–19??), painter
- Josip Milavec (1856–1920), promoter of Slovene ethnic identity
- Doré Ogrizek (Teodor; 1899–1983), publisher in Paris
- Ivan Pelicon (born 1920), journalist
- Ivan Podgornik (1868–1948), children's writer and translator
- Alojz Rovan (1870–1891), writer
- Anton Strle (1915–2003), priest, theologian, translator
- Drago Tršar (born 1927), sculptor
- Andrej Vavken (1838–1898), composer
- Miroslav Vilhar (1818–1871), poet, composer, and playwright

== Gallery ==
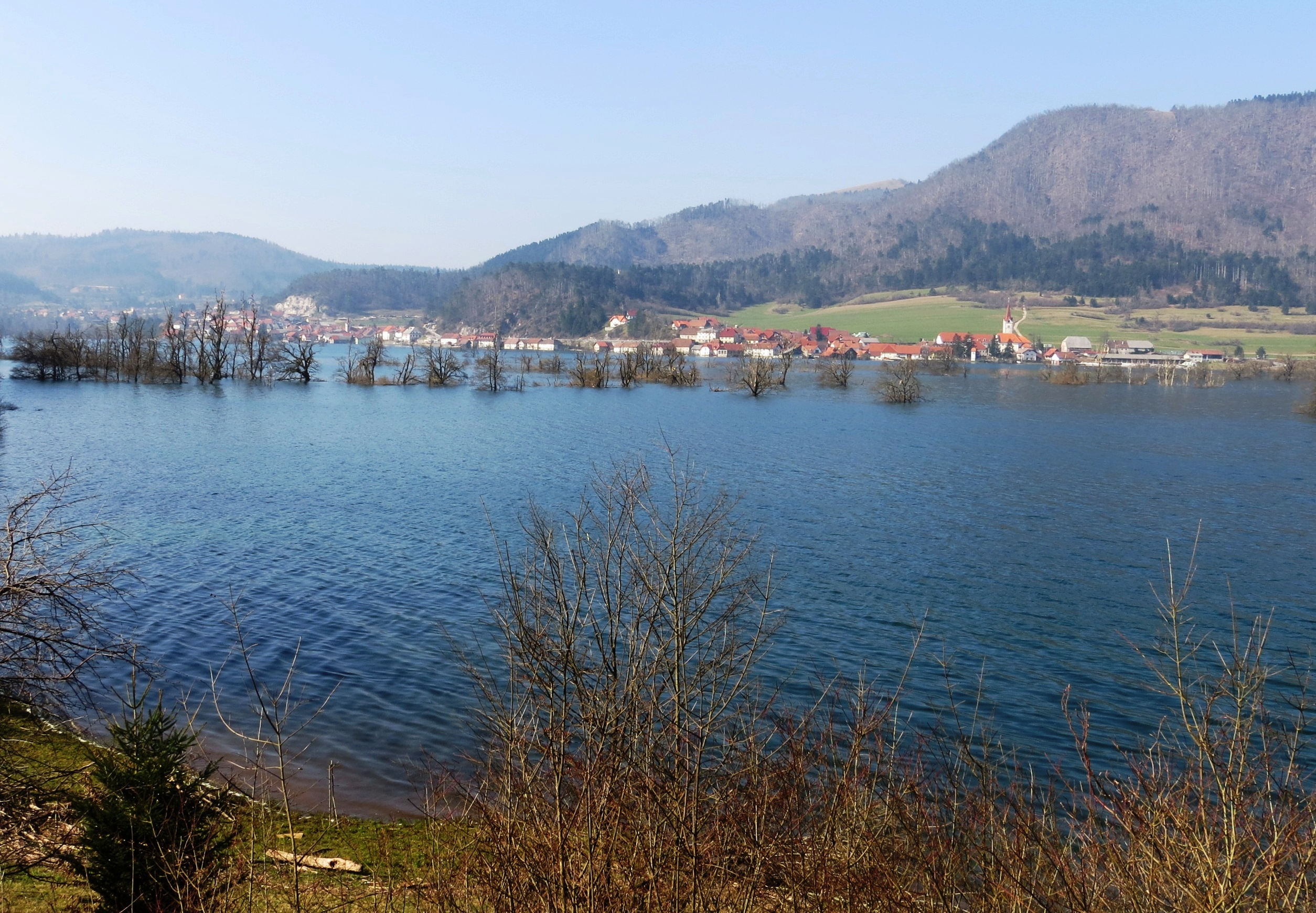
Planina with the flooded Planina Plain

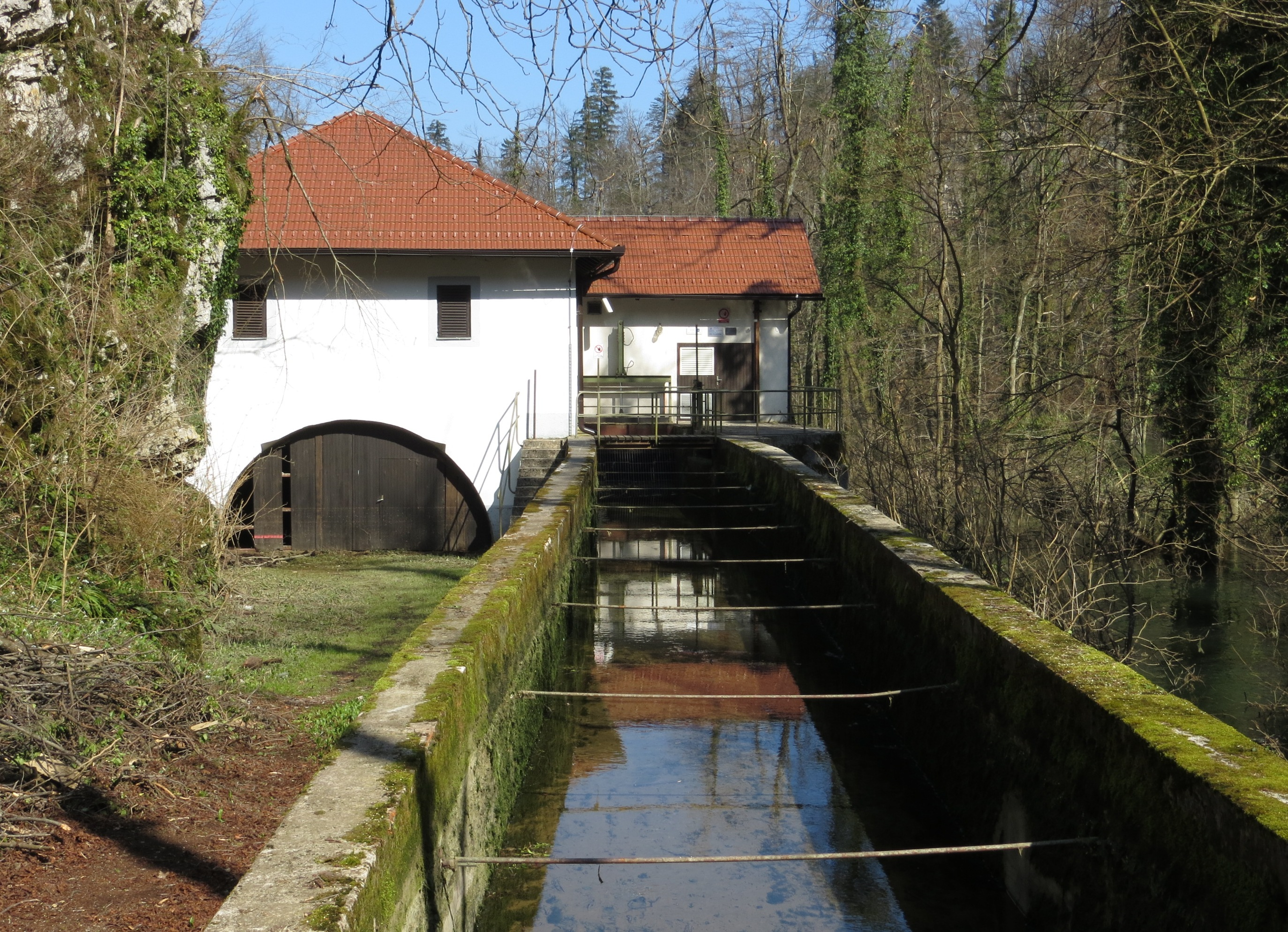
Hydroelectric plant

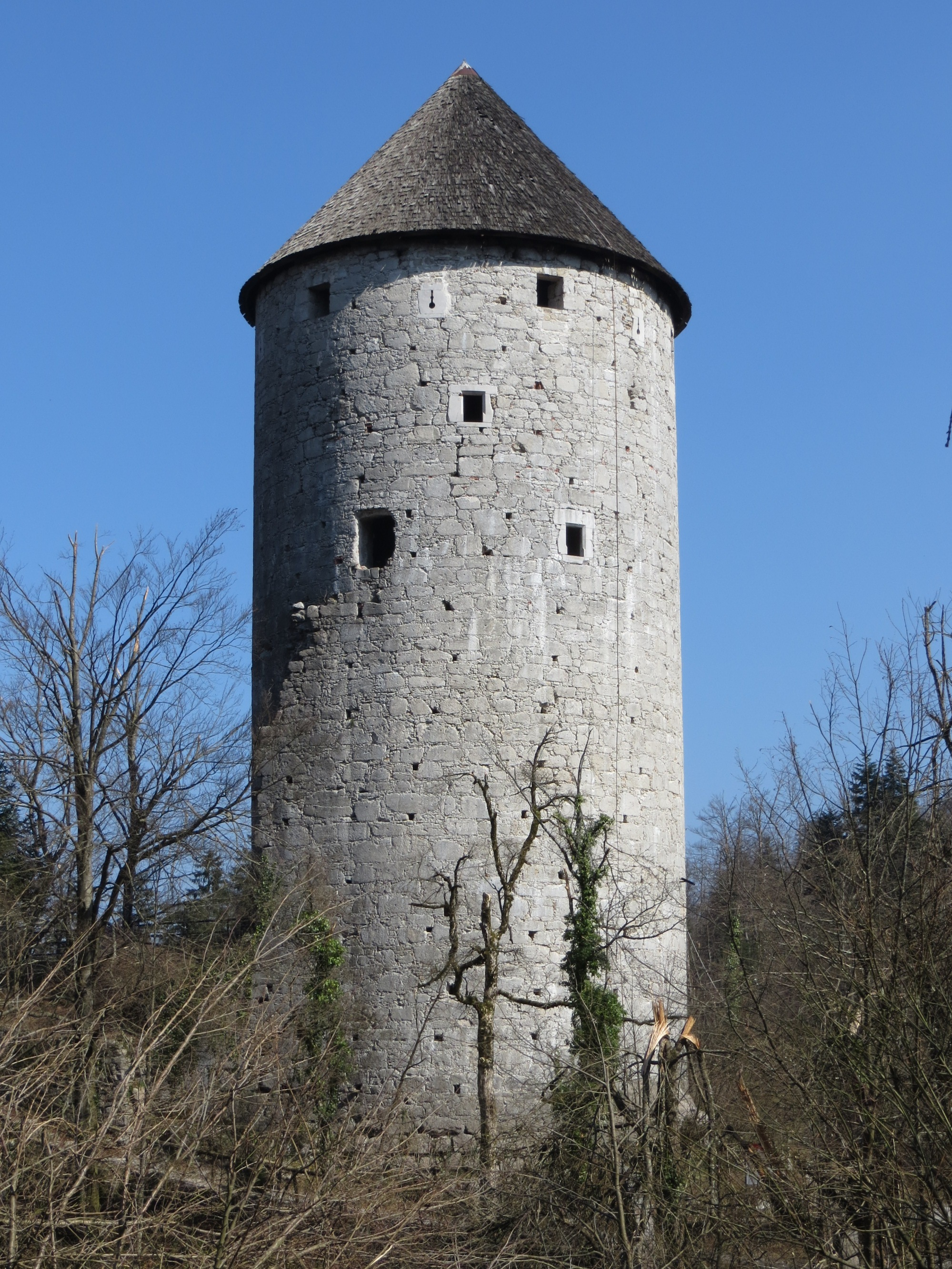
Rauber Tower of Little Castle
