= Planina =

Planina may refer to:

In Croatia:

- Planina Donja, a village near Zagreb
- Planina Gornja, a village near Zagreb
- Planina Skradska, a village near Skrad

In Serbia:

- Planina (Krupanj), a settlement in the Municipality of Krupanj

In Slovenia:

- Planina, Ajdovščina, a settlement in the Municipality of Ajdovščina
- Planina, Ivančna Gorica, a settlement in the Municipality of Ivančna Gorica
- Planina, Kostel, a settlement in the Municipality of Kostel
- Planina, Ljubno, a settlement in the Municipality of Ljubno
- Planina, Postojna, a settlement in the Municipality of Postojna
- Planina, Semič, a settlement in the Municipality of Semič
- Planina na Pohorju, a settlement in the Municipality of Zreče
- Planina nad Horjulom, a settlement in the Municipality of Dobrova–Polhov Gradec
- Planina pod Golico, a settlement in the Municipality of Jesenice
- Planina pod Šumikom, a settlement in the Municipality of Slovenska Bistrica
- Planina pri Cerknem, a settlement in the Municipality of Cerkno
- Planina pri Raki, a settlement in the Municipality of Krško
- Planina pri Sevnici, a settlement in the Municipality of Šentjur
- Planina v Podbočju, a settlement in the Municipality of Krško
- Podplanina, a settlement in the Municipality of Loški Potok, formerly known as Planina
- Sveta Planina, a settlement in the Municipality of Trbovlje
- Sveti Anton na Pohorju, a settlement in the Municipality of Radlje ob Dravi (named Planina from 1955 to 1993)
- Planina Cave, a cave in Inner Carniola
