= Volčje, Bloke =

Volčje
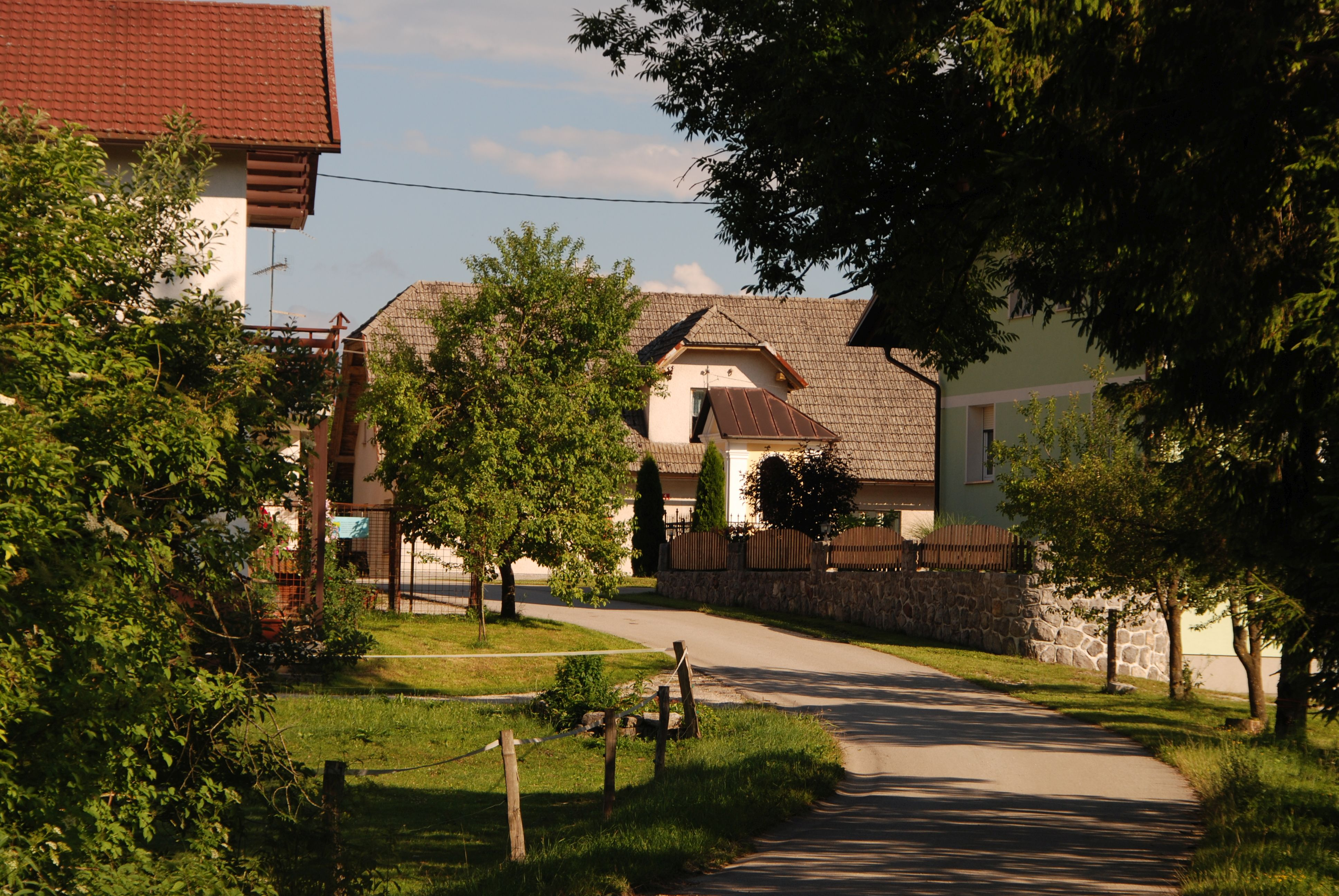

- Location in Slovenia
- Coordinates: 45°46′55.3″N 14°30′46.68″E
- Country: Slovenia
- Traditional region: Inner Carniola
- Statistical region: Littoral–Inner Carniola
- Municipality: Bloke

Area
  - Total: 2.21 km^{2} (0.85 sq mi)
- Elevation: 758.2 m (2,488 ft)

Population (2020)
  - Total: 44
  - Density: 20/km^{2} (52/sq mi)

Volčje (pronounced [ˈʋoːu̯tʃjɛ], German: Wolfsbach) is a small settlement north of Nova Vas in the Municipality of Bloke in the Inner Carniola region of Slovenia.

== Church ==
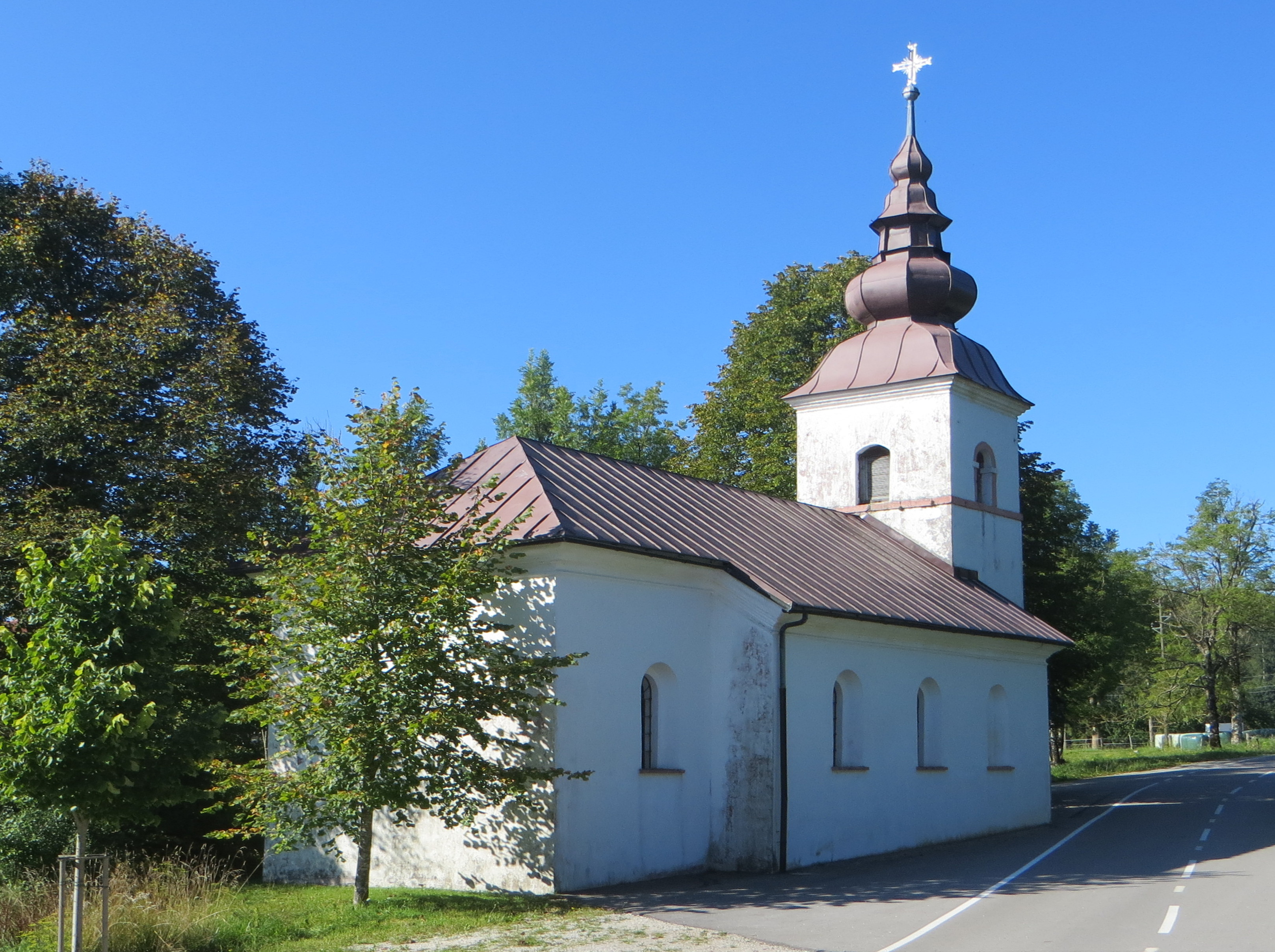
Saint Wolfgang's Church

The local church in the settlement is dedicated to Wolfgang of Regensburg and belongs to the Parish of Bloke.
