= Bloke Plateau =

Plateau in southern Slovenia

Coordinates: 45°46′34″N 14°30′26″E

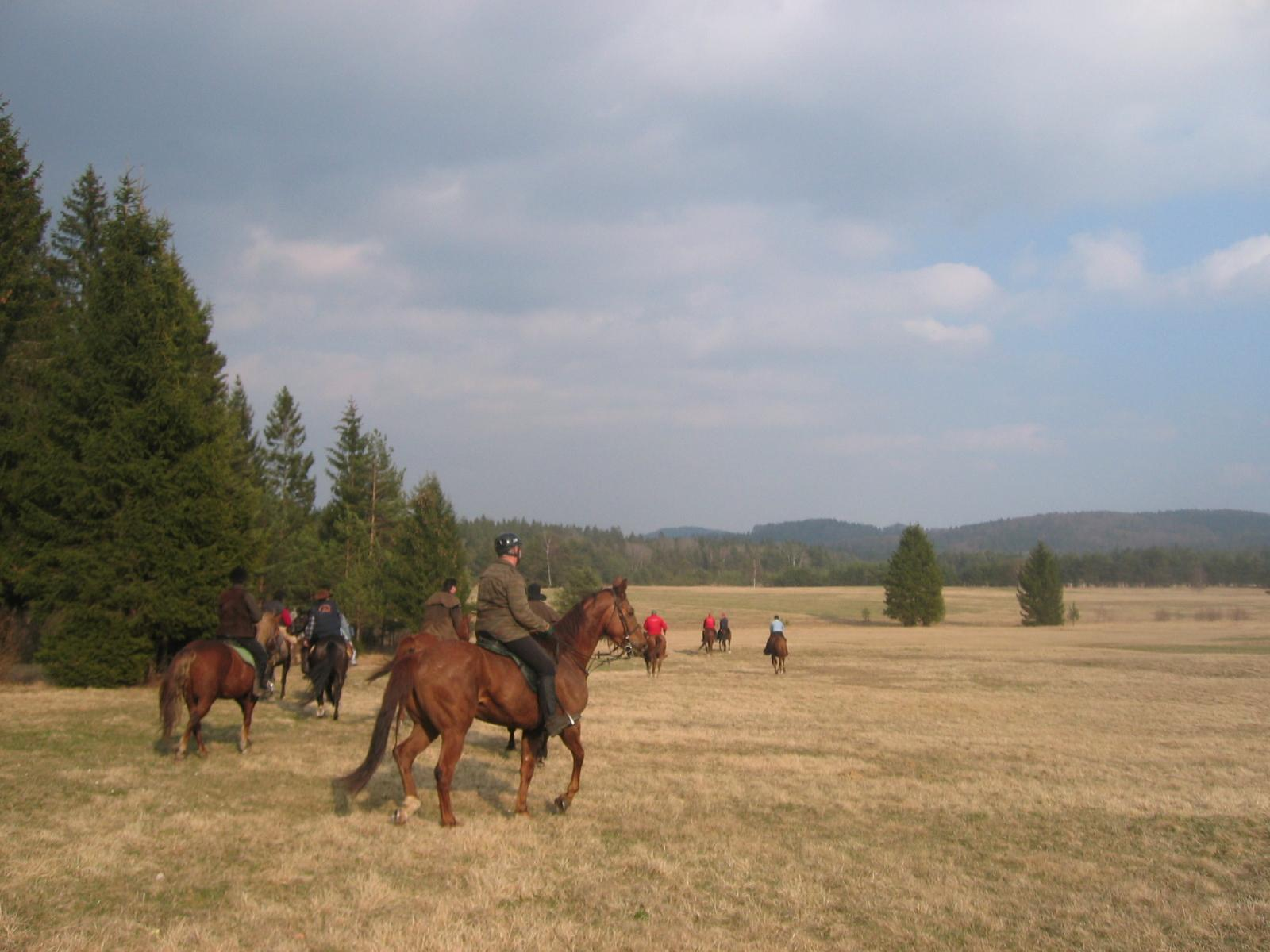
The Bloke Plateau

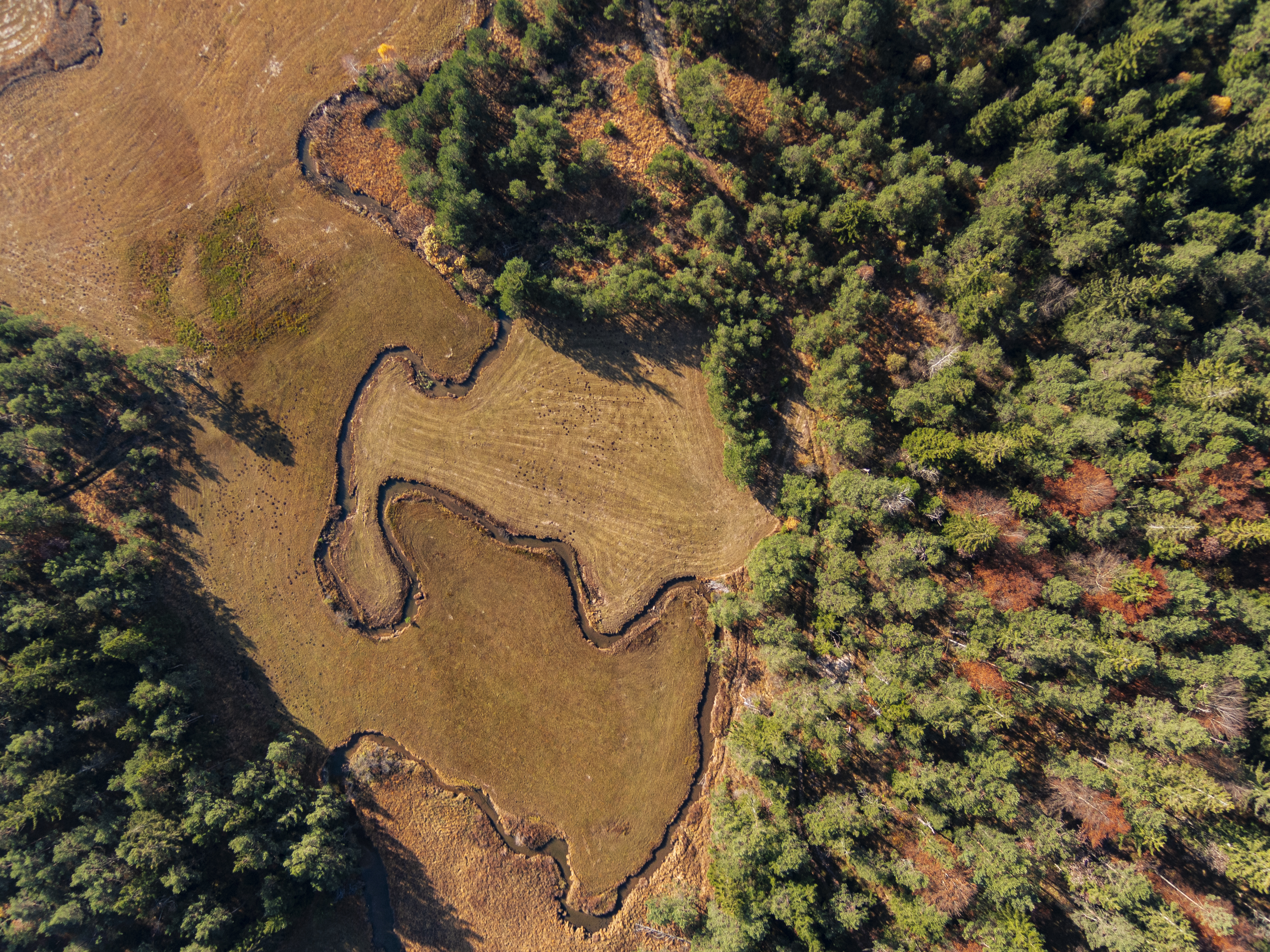
Meanders of the Bloščica River on the Bloke Plateau

The Bloke Plateau (Slovene: Bloška planota, Bloke) is an extensive bowl-like plateau in southern Slovenia, part of the traditional region of Inner Carniola.

== Geography ==
The Bloke Plateau measures approximately 15 kilometers (9.3 mi) long and 10 kilometers (6.2 mi) wide. It ranges in elevation between 700 meters (2,300 ft) and 800 meters (2,600 ft). Together with the Rakitna tectonic block, the plateau is delineated by two distinct Dinaric faults. According to the geographer Anton Melik, the Bloke Plateau is a remnant of a Pliocene peneplain in the middle of the rejuvenated terrain. Poorly permeable karst limestone and Triassic dolomite (in the northern part of the plateau) conditioned the formation of typical surface watercourses (Bloščica Creek and Blatnica Creek), which are bounded by wet grasslands and minerotrophic fens. Lake Bloke (Slovene: Bloško jezero), a reservoir, lies near the settlement of Volčje. Water flows below ground from the Bloke Plateau into Lake Cerknica. The plateau's many hills divide it into the Bloščica Valley and Ločica Valley (or Farovščica Valley), which join to form the Bloke–Fara Karst Field (Slovene: Bloško-Farovško polje). There are 45 settlements on the plateau, administratively belonging to the Municipality of Bloke.

The Bloke Plateau is accessible from several directions, especially from the Ljubljana and Littoral directions via the A1 Freeway and the town of Unec via Cerknica and from Lower Carniola via Ribnica and Sodražica. Points of interest in the area include Cross Cave (5 kilometers or 3.1 miles), Lake Cerknica (12 kilometers or 7.5 miles), Snežnik Castle (16 kilometers or 9.9 miles), and Rak Škocjan Park (a protected landscape area; 20 kilometers or 12 miles). Geographically, the Bloke Plateau also extends to Snežnik Regional Park.

== History ==
The Bloke Plateau was first mentioned in written documents in 1260, and its central settlement of Nova Vas in 1341. The territory was settled in the first millennium BC by the Iapydes (an Illyrian tribe). During the Roman era, a road led across the Bloke Plateau from Aquileia and the Kvarner Gulf toward the Pannonian Basin. Remains of a defense wall and a Roman tower near the village of Benete testify to this history.

== Cultural heritage ==
Culturally, the Bloke Plateau is known as the place where skiing originated in Slovenia, and a cross-country skiing competition is held there every year. The Bloke Plateau has long been crisscrossed by trade routes connecting the interior of Carniola, especially Lower Carniola and Inner Carniola, with Croatia.
