= Slivice =

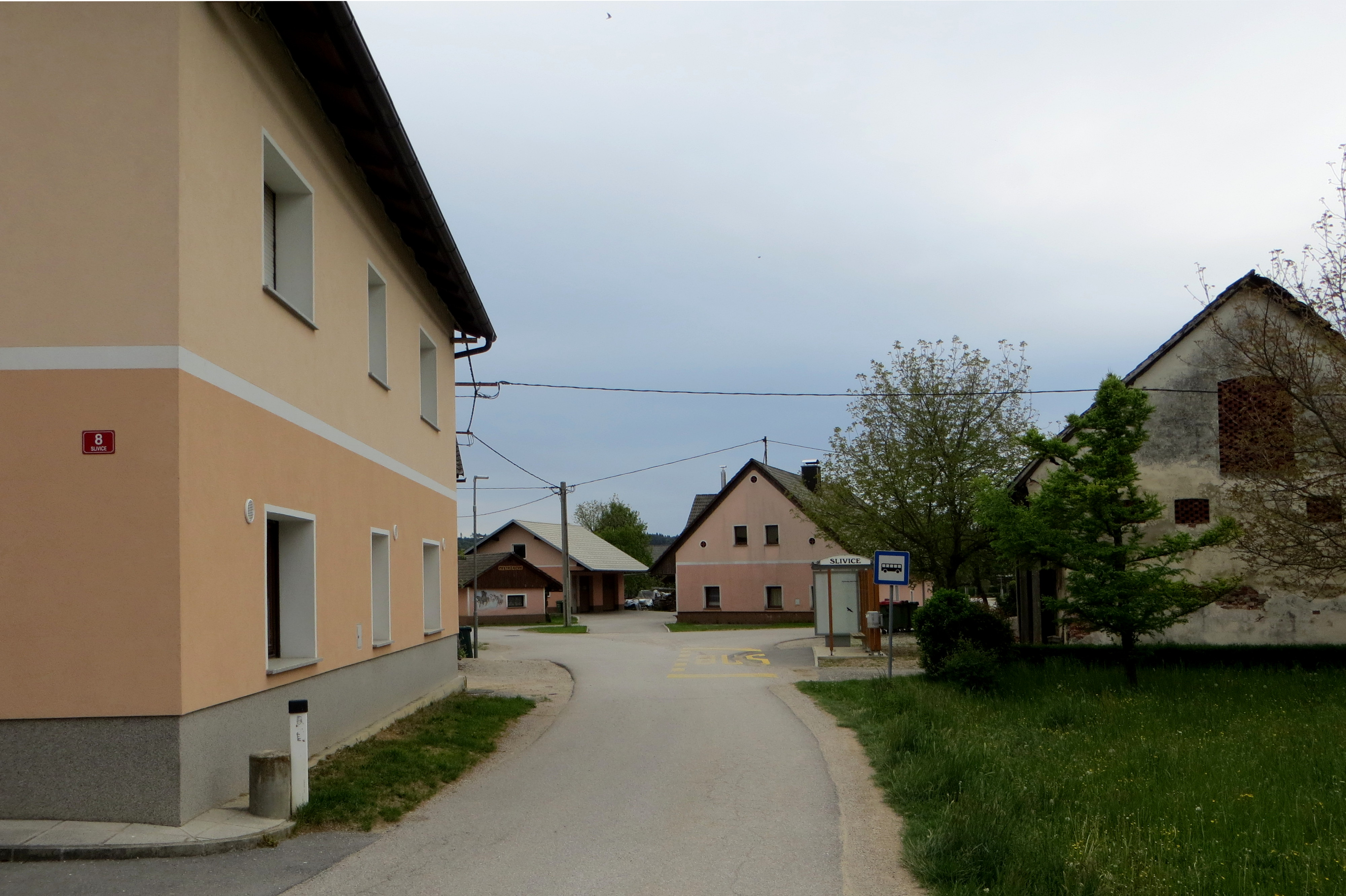

- Location in Slovenia
- Coordinates: 45°49′0.74″N 14°17′33.87″E
- Country: Slovenia
- Traditional region: Inner Carniola
- Statistical region: Littoral–Inner Carniola
- Municipality: Cerknica

Area
  - Total: 0.92 km^{2} (0.36 sq mi)
- Elevation: 521.3 m (1,710 ft)

Population (2020)
  - Total: 177
  - Density: 190/km^{2} (500/sq mi)

Slivice (pronounced [ˈsliːʋitsɛ]; German: Sliwitz) is a settlement west of Rakek in the Municipality of Cerknica in the Inner Carniola region of Slovenia.
