= Šmihel pod Nanosom =

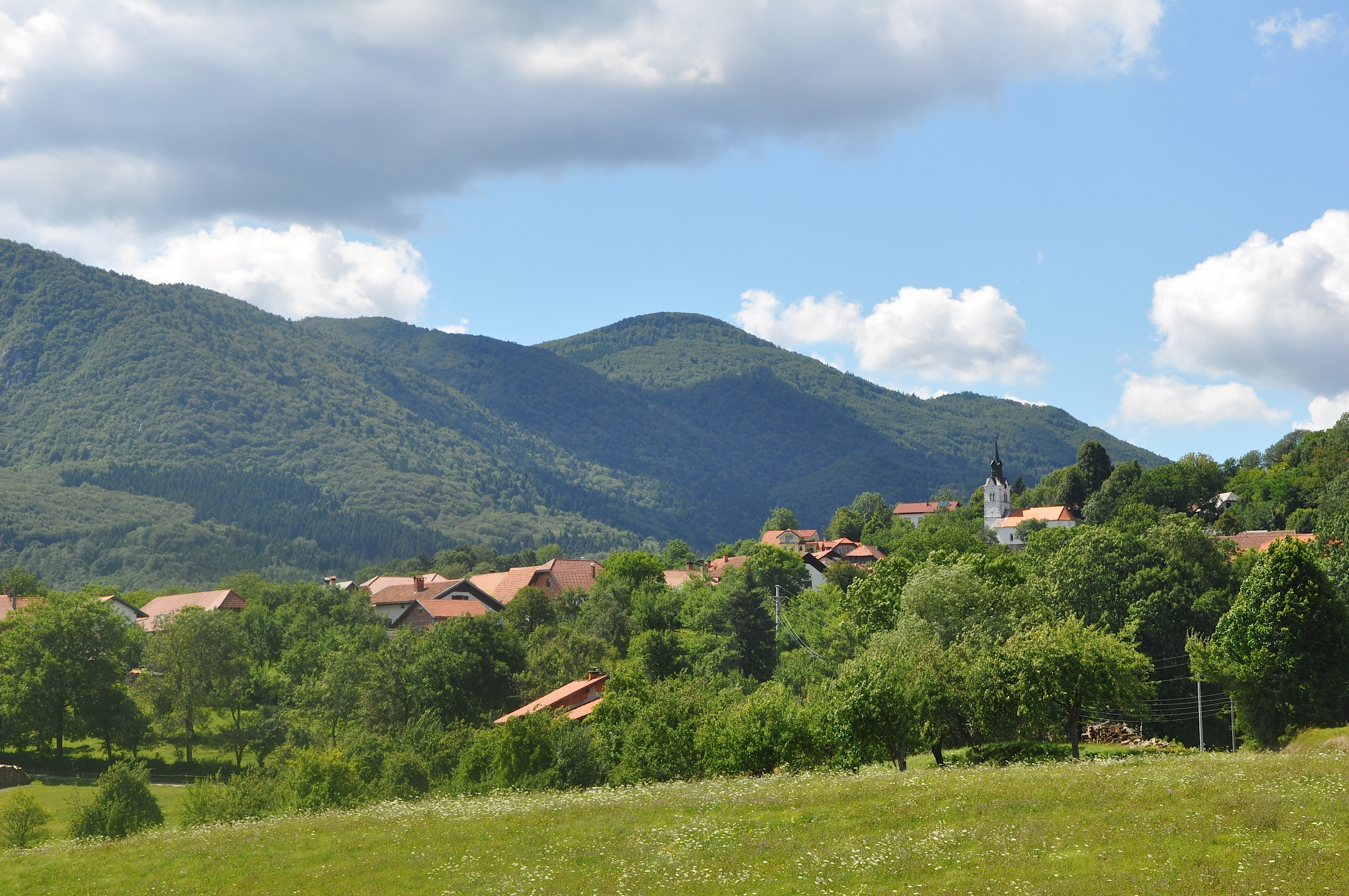

- Location in Slovenia
- Coordinates: 45°47′52.92″N 14°7′10″E
- Country: Slovenia
- Traditional region: Inner Carniola
- Statistical region: Littoral–Inner Carniola
- Municipality: Postojna

Area
  - Total: 10.98 km^{2} (4.24 sq mi)
- Elevation: 585.1 m (1,920 ft)

Population (2002)
  - Total: 171

Šmihel pod Nanosom (pronounced [ˈʃmiːxɛu̯ pɔt ˈnaːnɔsɔm]; Italian: San Michele) is a village in the eastern foothills of Mount Nanos in the Municipality of Postojna in the Inner Carniola region of Slovenia.

== Archaeological site ==
North of the settlement, a site known as Grad is one of the most important archaeological sites in the Inner Carniola region. This prehistoric site attracted much attention in the late 19th and early 20th centuries, when it was suggested that it was the site of Metalum, one of the main settlement of the Iapydes. Although this is no longer claimed, the site remains one of the most important bases for the definition and chronology of the Iron Age culture known as the Inner Carniola Iron Age Group, with continuous settlement between the 8th and 2nd centuries BC. It is believed the settlement was taken over by the Romans in their 2nd-century expansion to the north. As Roman rule was established the settlement was abandoned in the 1st century BC. In 1890 a major hoard of Roman Republican weapons with over 350 artifacts was found at the site. Finds from the site are kept in the Vienna Natural History Museum and the National Museum of Slovenia.

== Churches ==
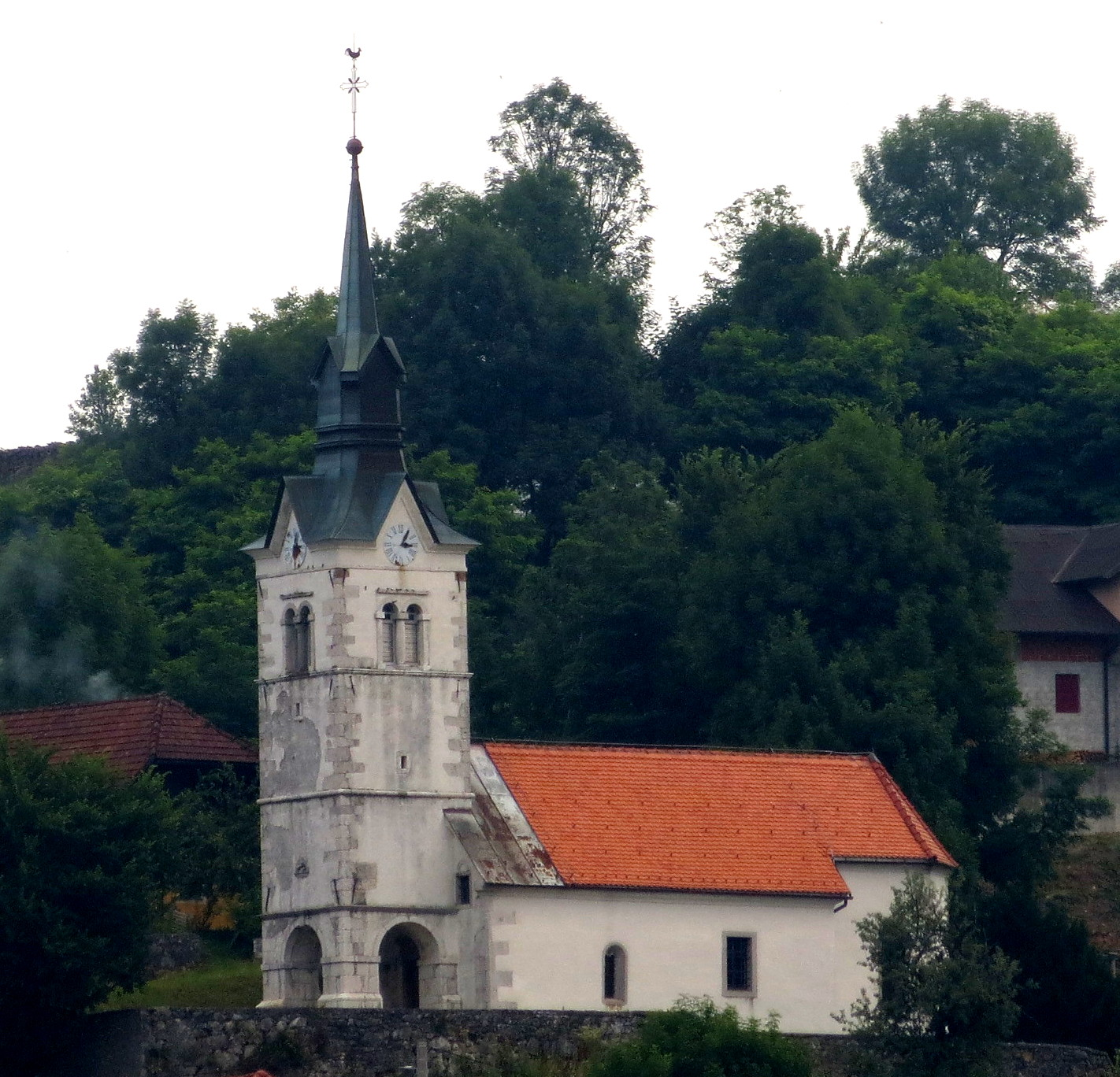
Archangel Michael Church

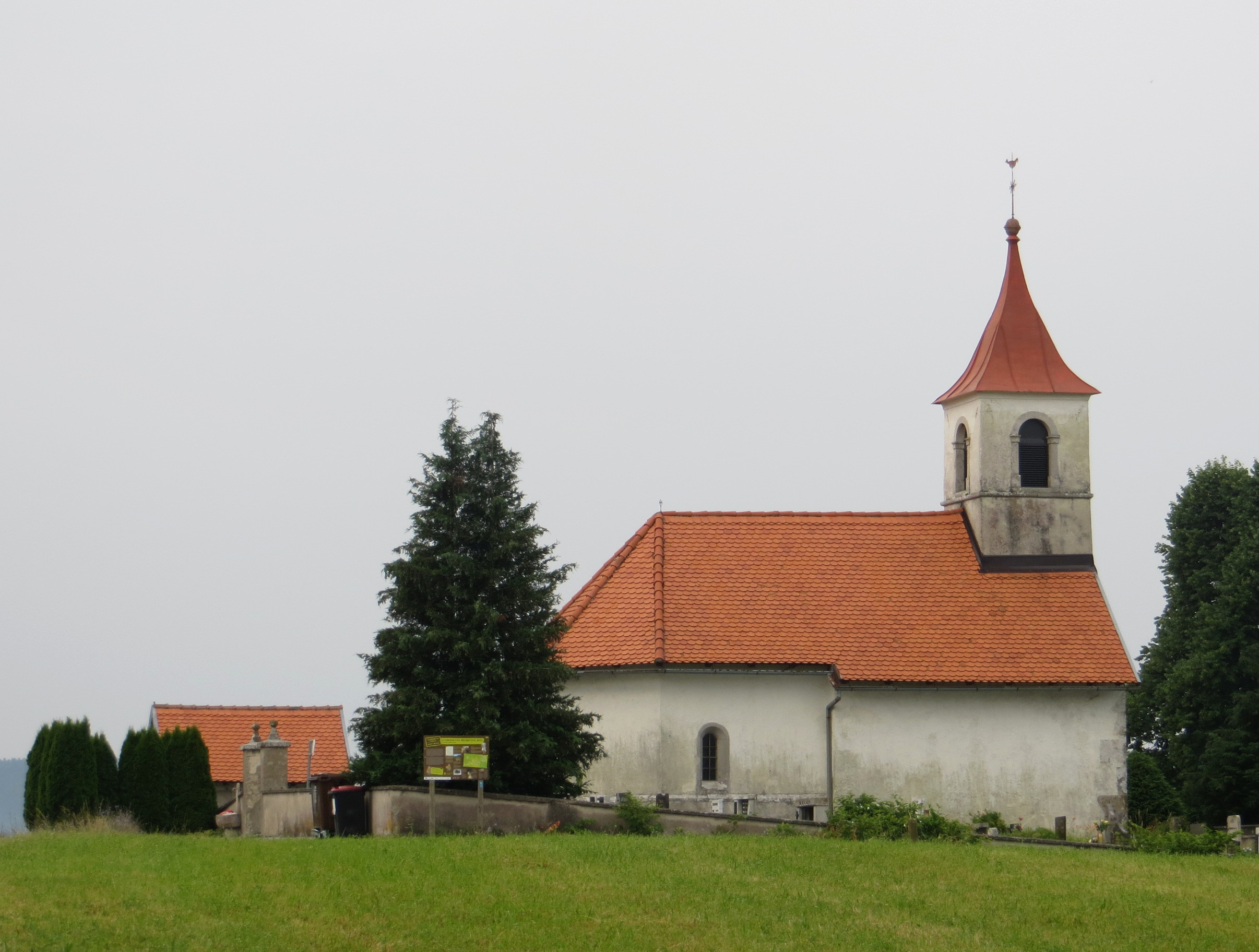
Saint George's Church

The village church, from which the settlement gets its name, is dedicated to Saint Michael. A second church, next to the cemetery south of the village, is dedicated to Saint George. Both belong to the Parish of Hrenovice.
