= Hrenovice =

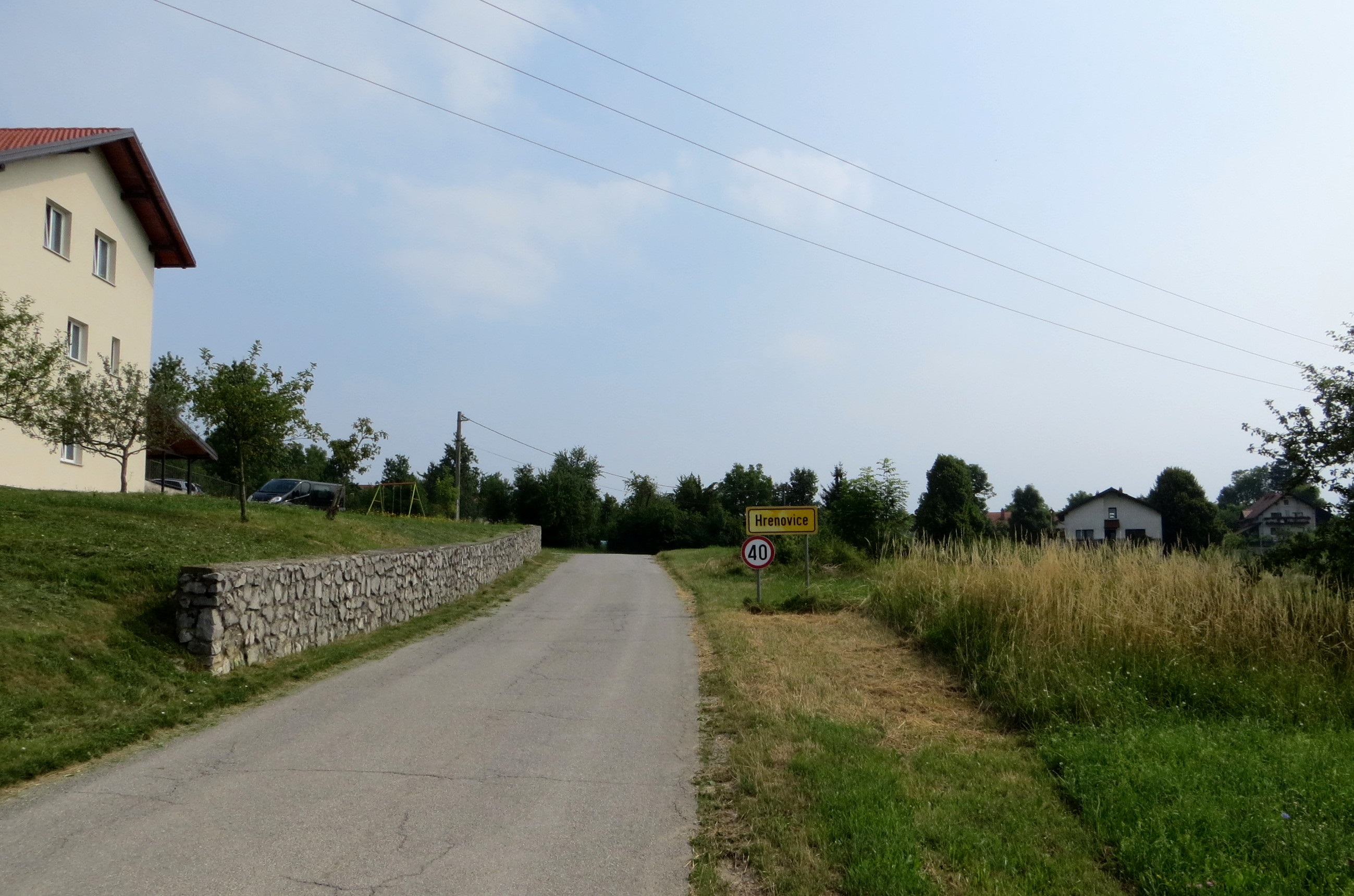

- Location in Slovenia
- Coordinates: 45°46′43.99″N 14°8′44.13″E
- Country: Slovenia
- Traditional region: Inner Carniola
- Statistical region: Littoral–Inner Carniola
- Municipality: Postojna

Area
  - Total: 2.42 km^{2} (0.93 sq mi)
- Elevation: 553.8 m (1,817 ft)

Population (2002)
  - Total: 185

Hrenovice (pronounced [ˈxɾeːnɔʋitsɛ]; Italian: Crenovizza) is a settlement west of Postojna in the Inner Carniola region of Slovenia.

== Geography ==
Hrenovice stands in the lower part of the Pivka Basin. The compactly built-up main part of the village lies along a side rode on the east slope of Kres Hill (571 meters or 1,873 feet). The hamlet of Pri Bolku lies to the south, along the old main road from Razdrto to Postojna. The hamlet of Fara (also known as Pri Fara or Na Hribu) lies to the west. The two main springs in the settlement, named Bajer na Loki (literally, 'the pond in the flood meadow') and Grilova ograda (literally, 'Gril's enclosure'), are located in Pri Bolku. At the northeast edge of the village, spruce-covered Pugled Hill (563 meters or 1,847 feet) rises above the Nanoščica River, which is subject to frequent flooding.

== History ==
Partisan units were often active in the area during the Second World War. German forces shelled Partisan forces in Fara on April 23, 1944. The attack burned several houses and damaged the church tower, but the church, which also caught fire, was saved.

== Church ==
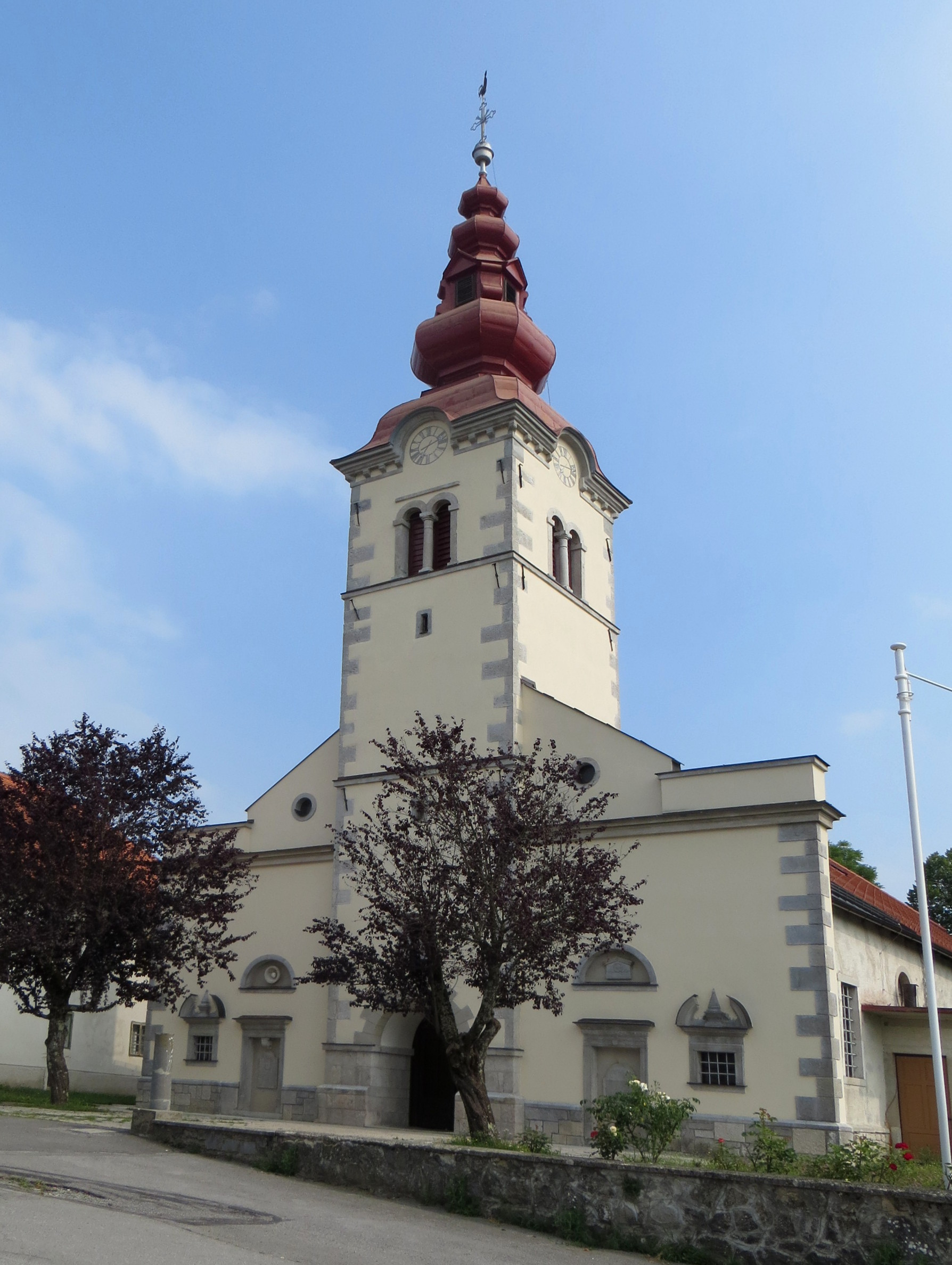
Saint Martin's Church

The parish church, built about 1 km west of the main village in the hamlet of Fara, is dedicated to Saint Martin and belongs to the Koper Diocese. It was built in the Middle Ages and then reworked several times. It contains sculptures by Michael Cussa (1657–1699), Alojzij Goetzl (1820–1905), and Franc Ksaver Tončič (1865–1919), and paintings created in 1942/43 by Tone Kralj and his wife Mara Kralj.
