= Bloška Polica =

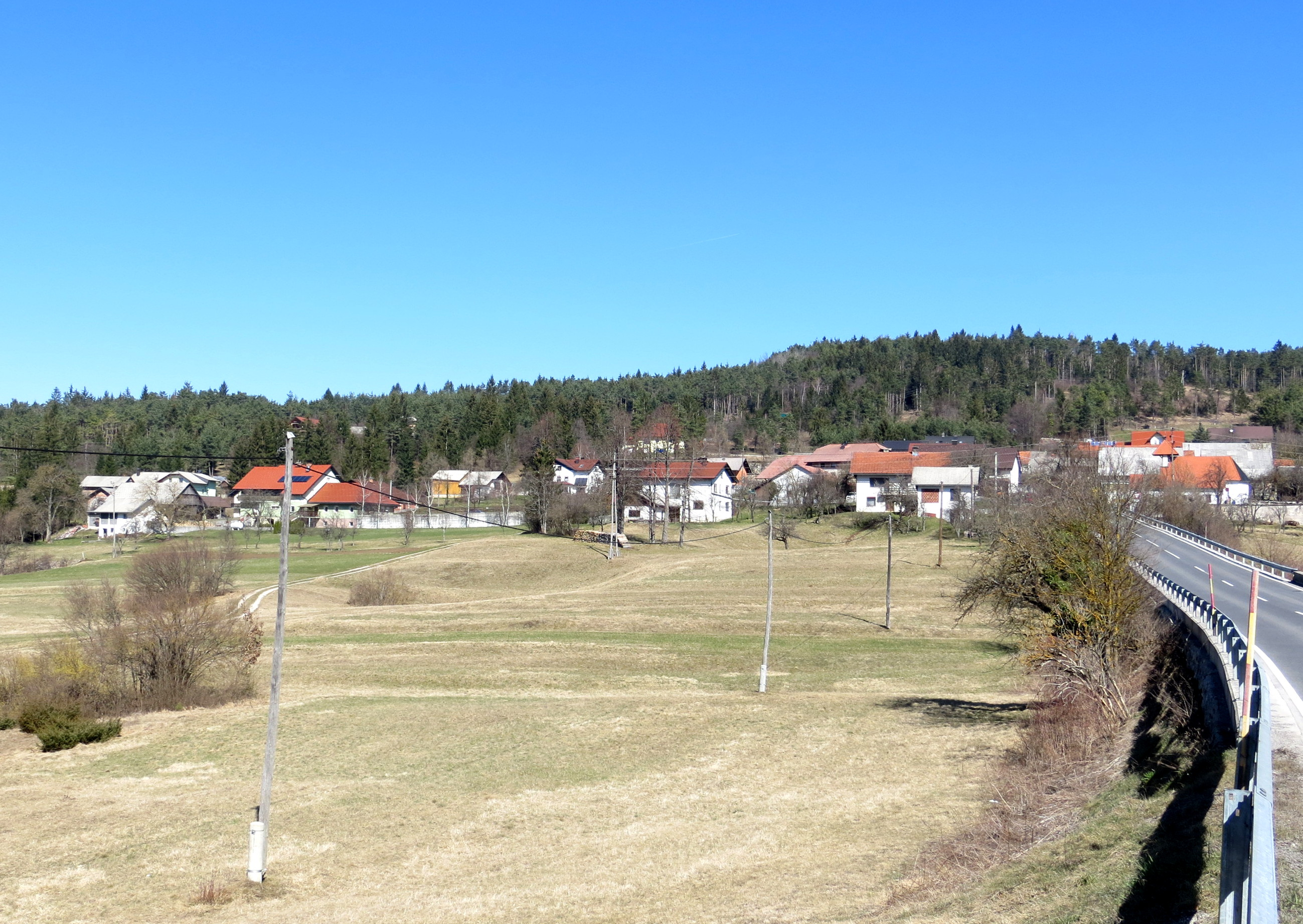

- Location in Slovenia
- Coordinates: 45°45′35.89″N 14°28′10.01″E
- Country: Slovenia
- Traditional region: Inner Carniola
- Statistical region: Littoral–Inner Carniola
- Municipality: Cerknica

Area
  - Total: 4.17 km^{2} (1.61 sq mi)
- Elevation: 682.2 m (2,238 ft)

Population (2020)
  - Total: 89
  - Density: 21/km^{2} (55/sq mi)

Bloška Polica (pronounced [ˈbloːʃka pɔˈliːtsa]) is a village east of Grahovo in the Municipality of Cerknica in the Inner Carniola region of Slovenia.

== Name ==
Bloška Polica was attested in written sources as Oblackher Politz in 1384 and Polcz ze Obluk in 1397.

== Church ==
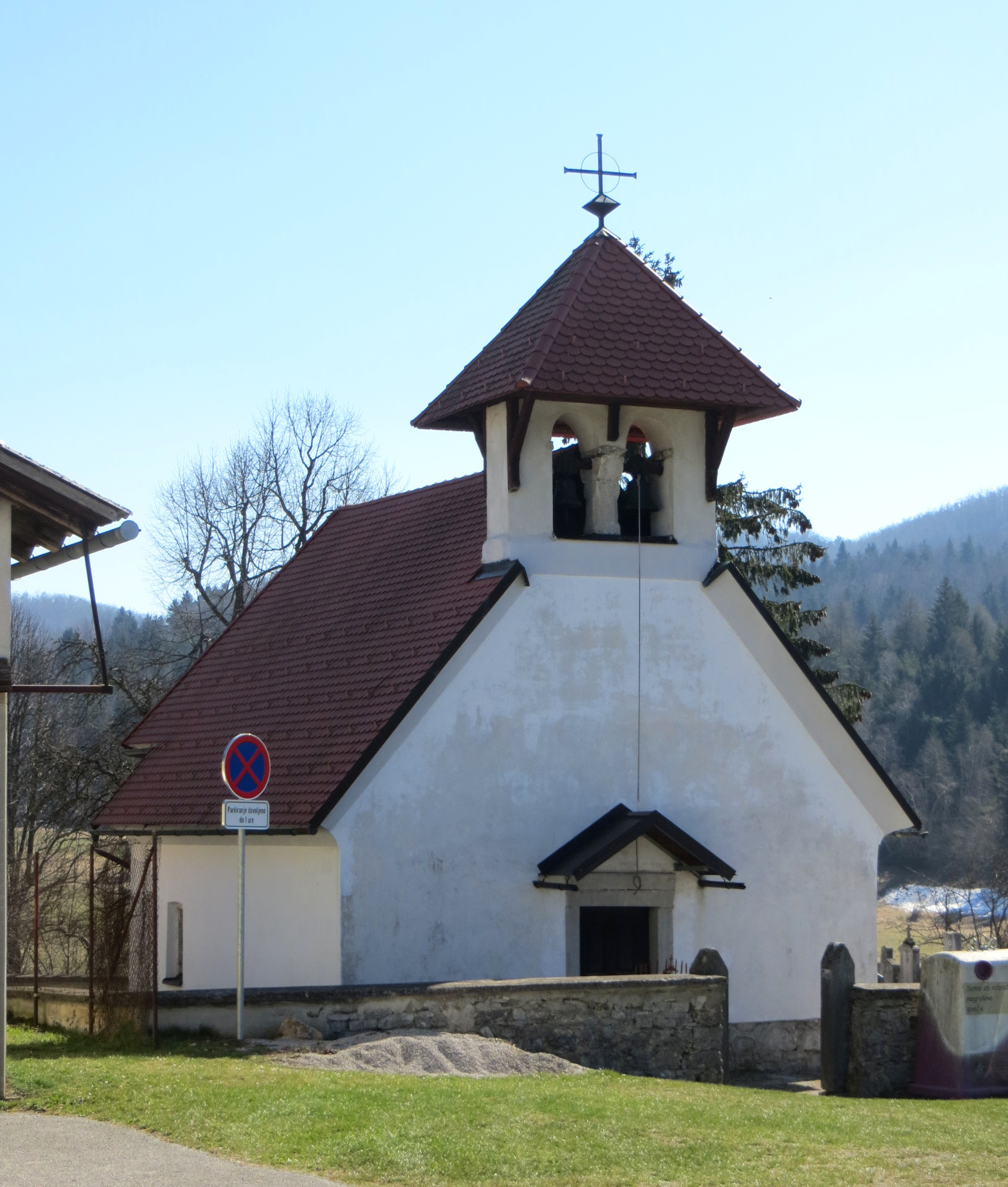
Saint Vincent's Church

The local church in the settlement is dedicated to Saint Vincent and belongs to the Parish of Stari Trg.
