= Velike Bloke =

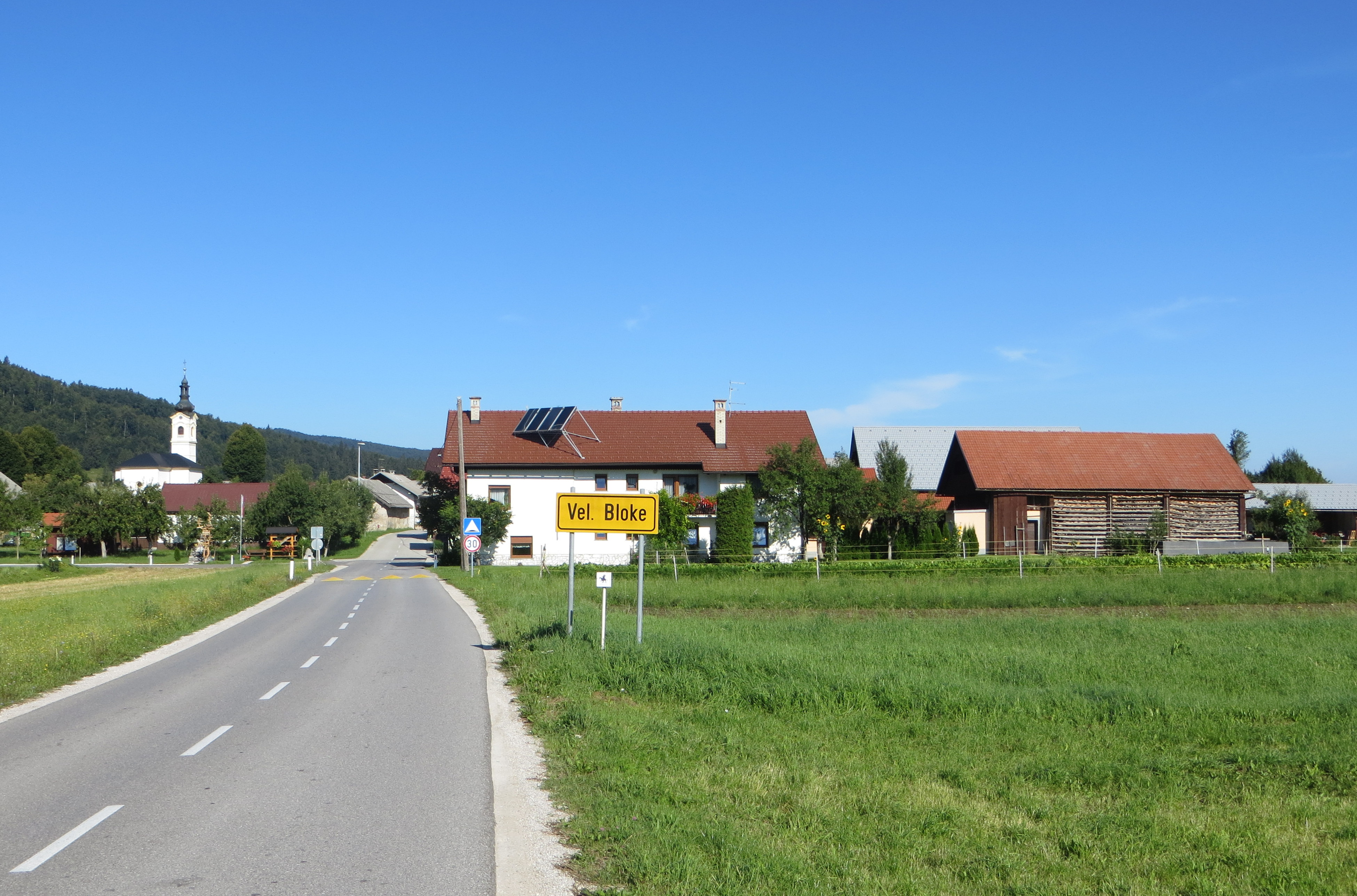

- Location in Slovenia
- Coordinates: 45°47′6.11″N 14°28′47.59″E
- Country: Slovenia
- Traditional region: Inner Carniola
- Statistical region: Littoral–Inner Carniola
- Municipality: Bloke

Area
  - Total: 6.37 km^{2} (2.46 sq mi)
- Elevation: 729.4 m (2,393 ft)

Population (2020)
  - Total: 230
  - Density: 36/km^{2} (94/sq mi)

Velike Bloke (pronounced [ˈʋéːlikɛ ˈblòːkɛ, - ˈblóː-], German: Großoblak) is a village in the Municipality of Bloke in the Inner Carniola region of Slovenia.

== Name ==
The name Velike Bloke literally means 'big Bloke' and originally distinguished the settlement from Male Bloke (literally, 'little Bloke'). However, after the parish church was built in Male Bloke, that settlement became known as Fara (literally, 'parish'). The name Bloke itself was first attested in written sources in 1230 as Oblach (and as Oblukch in 1260, Oblakh in 1360, and Obloc in 1581). These early attestations indicate that the name was originally *Obloke, probably derived from the prepositional phrase *ob(ь) lǫky or *ob(ь) lǫkaxъ 'next to the flood-meadow(s)'. Less likely theories connect the name to the meanings 'next to rough terrain' or 'arc, arch'.

== Church ==
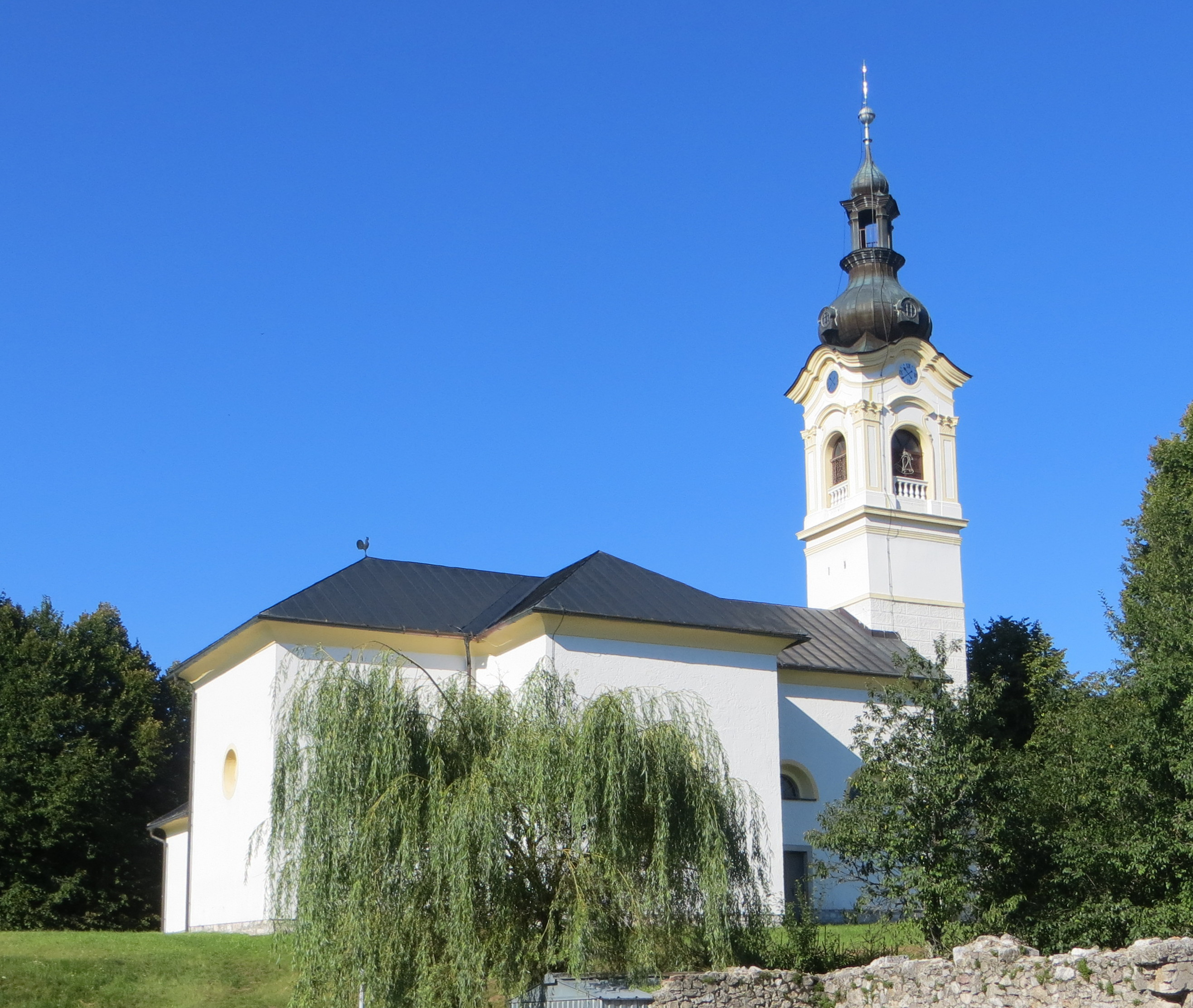
Assumption Church

The local church in the settlement is dedicated to the Assumption of Mary and belongs to the Parish of Bloke.

== Cultural heritage ==
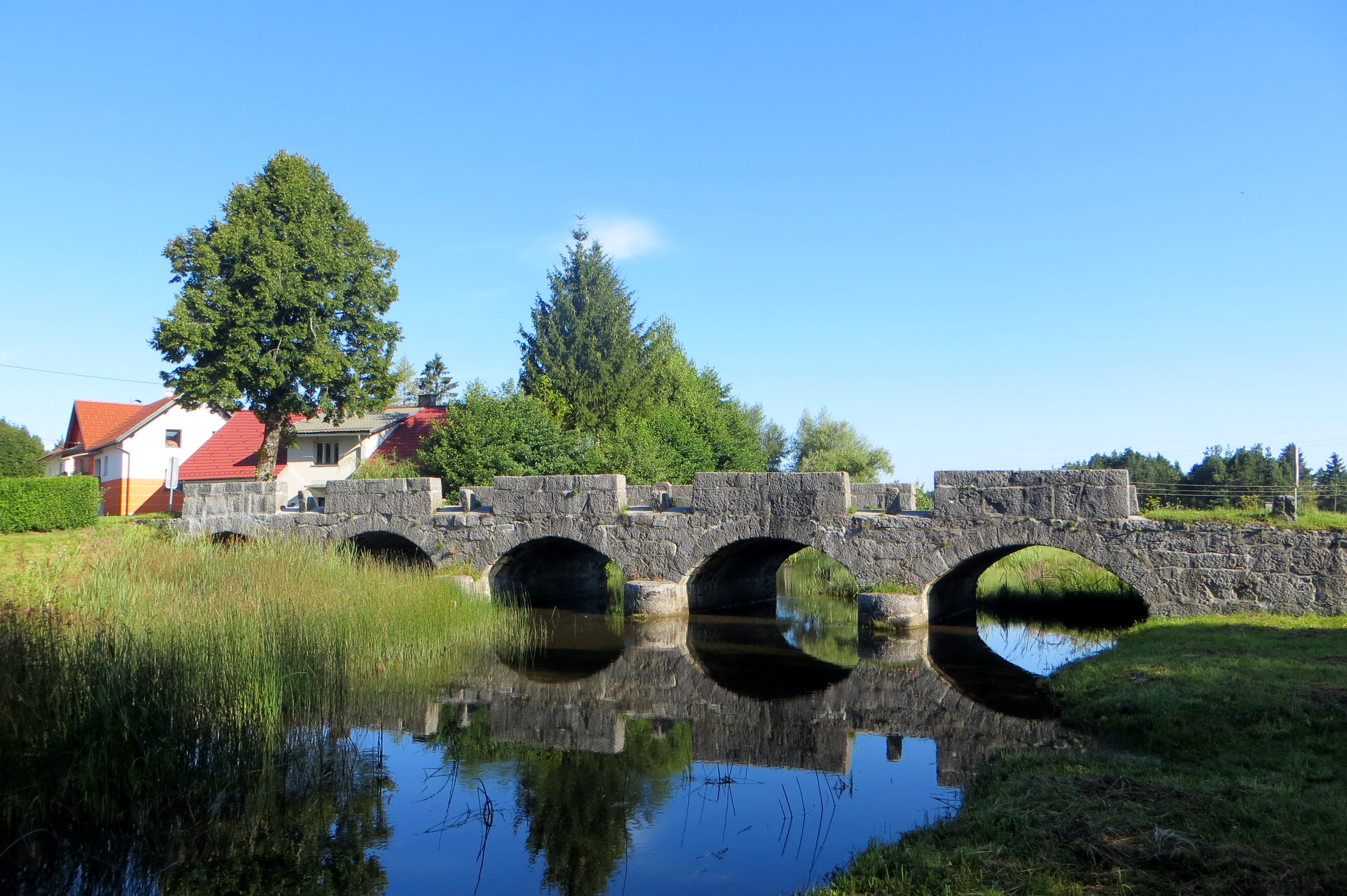
The Napoleon Bridge

A stone bridge over Bloščica Creek northwest of the center of Velike Bloke is known as the Napoleon Bridge (Slovene: Napoleonov most) and is registered as cultural heritage. However, it was built in 1858 and has no connection to Napoleon; the reason for its name is unknown.
