= Fara, Bloke =

Fara
- Village
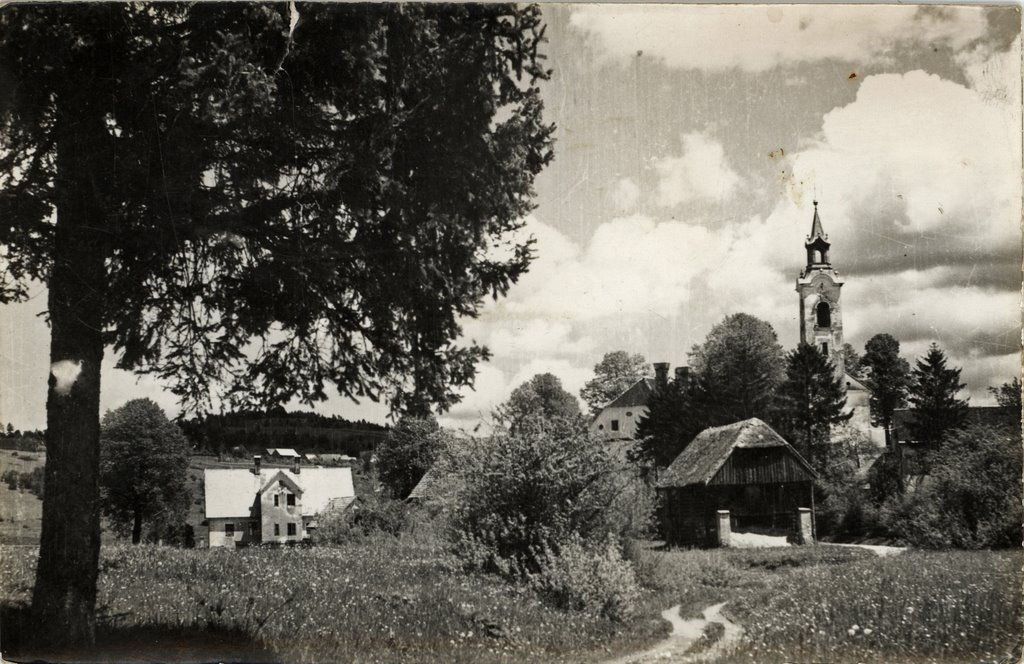
- 1963 postcard of Fara

- Location in Slovenia
- Coordinates: 45°46′0.47″N 14°30′28.64″E
- Country: Slovenia
- Traditional region: Inner Carniola
- Statistical region: Littoral–Inner Carniola
- Municipality: Bloke

Area
  - Total: 13.09 km^{2} (5.05 sq mi)
- Elevation: 717.1 m (2,353 ft)

Population (2020)
  - Total: 52
  - Density: 4.0/km^{2} (10/sq mi)

Fara (pronounced [ˈfaːɾa], in older sources Bloke and Pri Fari, German: Pfarrdorf) is a settlement just south of Nova Vas in the Municipality of Bloke in the Inner Carniola region of Slovenia.

== Name ==
The settlement was formerly called (Male) Bloke (literally, '(little) Bloke'), distinguishing it from Velike Bloke (literally, 'big Bloke'). The Bloke parish church was built in the settlement, and the name Fara (literally, 'parish') became the name of the settlement.

== Church ==
The parish church in the village is dedicated to Saint Michael and belongs to the Roman Catholic Archdiocese of Ljubljana. It has been an independent parish since at least the 14th century.
