= Unec =

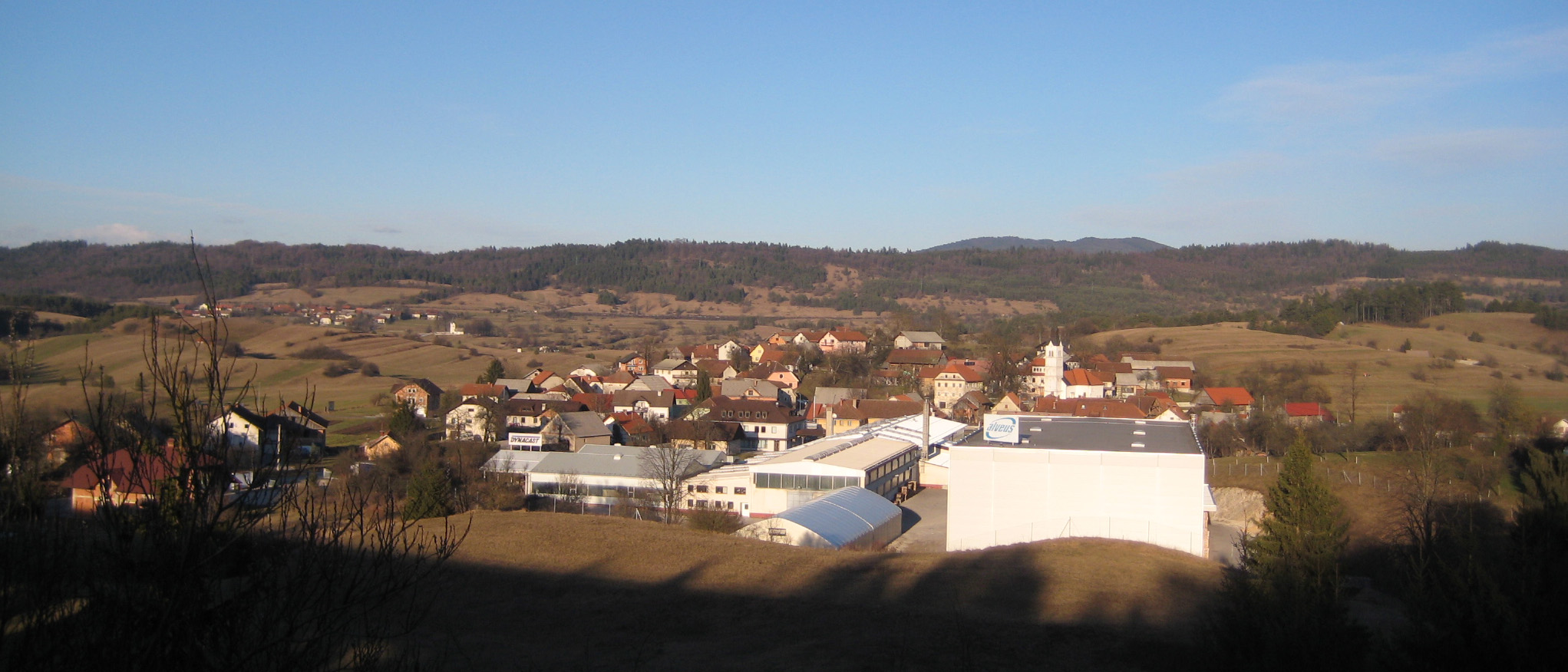

- Location in Slovenia
- Coordinates: 45°49′18.91″N 14°17′39.2″E
- Country: Slovenia
- Traditional region: Inner Carniola
- Statistical region: Littoral–Inner Carniola
- Municipality: Cerknica

Area
  - Total: 4.52 km^{2} (1.75 sq mi)
- Elevation: 519.7 m (1,705 ft)

Population (2020)
  - Total: 582
  - Density: 129/km^{2} (333/sq mi)

Unec (pronounced [ˈuːnəts]; German: Maunitz) is a settlement northwest of Rakek in the Municipality of Cerknica in the Inner Carniola region of Slovenia.

== Name ==
Unec was attested in written sources in 1295 as Mov̊nitz and Mov̊ncz (and as Mounç in 1300 and Movncz in 1307). Morphologically, the name indicates that it has an adjectival base and can be derived from *unъ 'good, desired'. Another possibility is derivation from the hypocorism *Unъ, referring to an early settler of the place. The name is probably not connected with the Una River in Croatia, which is likely of pre-Slavic origin.

== Church ==
The parish church in the settlement is dedicated to Saint Martin and belongs to the Roman Catholic Archdiocese of Ljubljana. It was first mentioned in written documents dating to 1526, but elements of an older church are visible on the exterior.
