= Nova Vas, Bloke =

Nova Vas
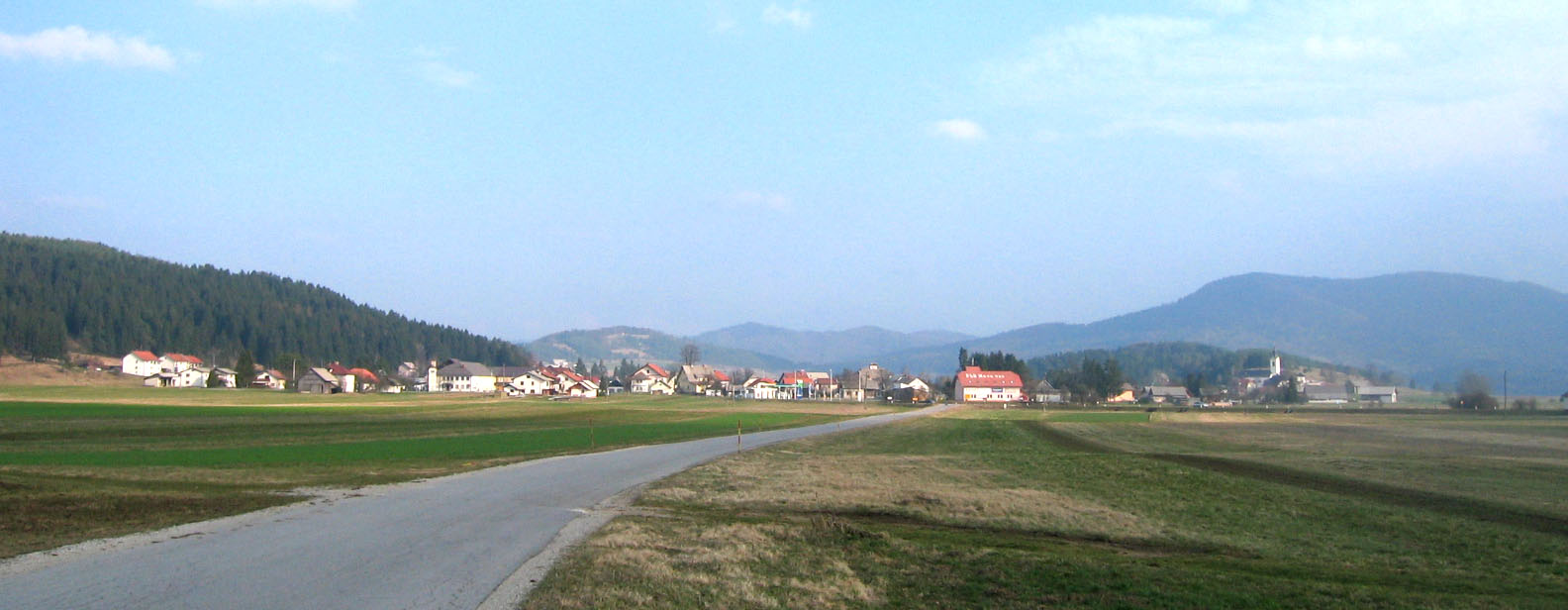

- Location in Slovenia
- Coordinates: 45°46′21.18″N 14°30′22.9″E
- Country: Slovenia
- Traditional region: Inner Carniola
- Statistical region: Littoral–Inner Carniola
- Municipality: Bloke

Area
  - Total: 1.42 km^{2} (0.55 sq mi)
- Elevation: 720 m (2,360 ft)

Population (2020)
  - Total: 293
  - Density: 206/km^{2} (534/sq mi)

Nova Vas (pronounced [ˈnɔːʋa ˈʋaːs]; Slovene: Nova vas, German: Neudorf) is the largest village and the administrative centre of the Municipality of Bloke in the Inner Carniola region of Slovenia.

== Name ==
Nova Vas was attested in written sources as villa nova in 1282, Newndorf in 1341, and Newdarff in 1499, among other spellings. The name Nova vas literally means 'new village', designating a settlement that was created later than nearby villages. Nova vas is a common toponym in Slovenia.
