= Rakek =

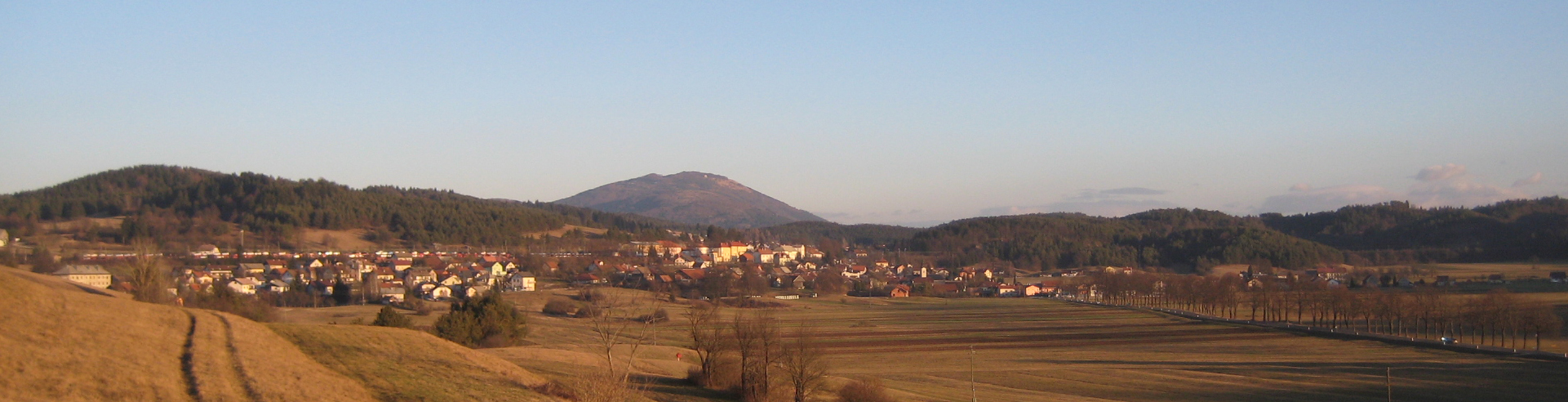

- Location in Slovenia
- Coordinates: 45°48′52.1″N 14°18′44.39″E
- Country: Slovenia
- Traditional region: Inner Carniola
- Statistical region: Littoral–Inner Carniola
- Municipality: Cerknica

Area
  - Total: 7.01 km^{2} (2.71 sq mi)
- Elevation: 547.5 m (1,796 ft)

Population (2020)
  - Total: 2,190
  - Density: 312/km^{2} (809/sq mi)

Rakek (pronounced [ˈɾaːkək]; Italian: Recchio) is a settlement in the Municipality of Cerknica in the Inner Carniola region of Slovenia.

== Name ==
Rakek was attested in written sources in 1300 as Rachach and in 1498 as Rakeckh. The name is derived from the Rak River. The Italian name Recchio was coined in the 20th century.

== History ==
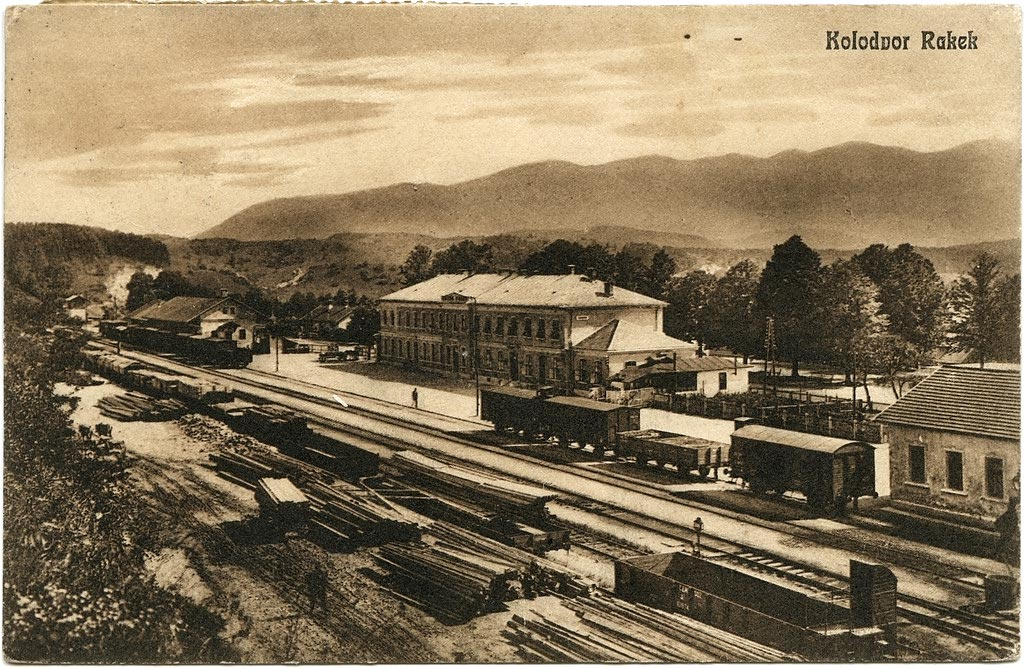
Timber at the station in 1933

In 1857 the Austrian Southern Railway line was built through the settlement and it became an important collection point for timber from surrounding forests. There is a monument to victims of World War II by the Slovene sculptor Jakob Savinšek in the main square in front of the railway station.

== Church ==
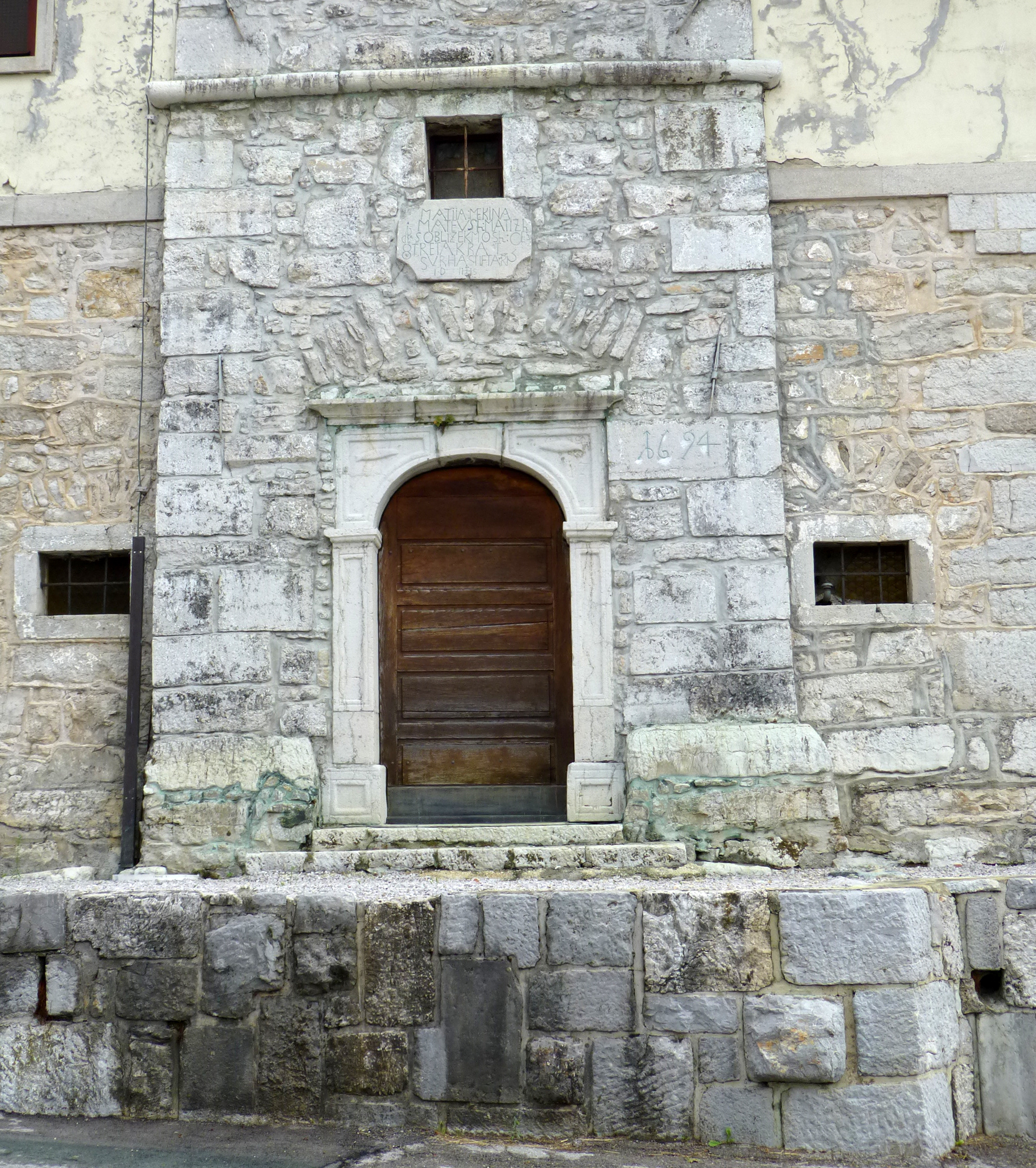
Church portal built in 1694

The parish church in the settlement is dedicated to the Sacred Heart of Jesus and belongs to the Roman Catholic Archdiocese of Ljubljana. It was built in the late 16th century and was extensively rebuilt and extended between 1935 and 1938, based partly on plans by Jože Plečnik.
