= Koseze, Vodice =

Koseze
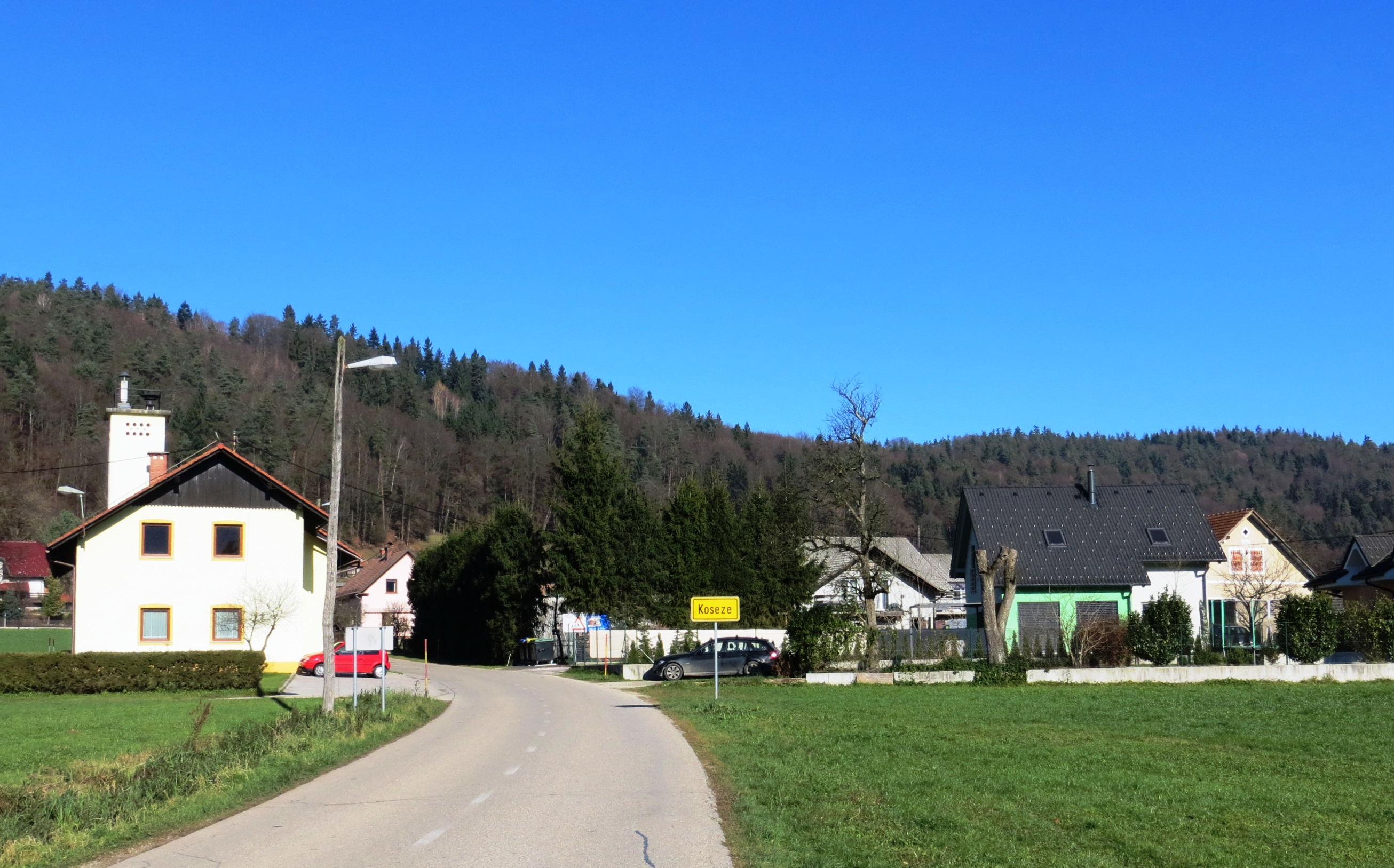

- Location in Slovenia
- Coordinates: 46°10′8.24″N 14°31′8.04″E
- Country: Slovenia
- Traditional region: Upper Carniola
- Statistical region: Central Slovenia
- Municipality: Vodice

Area
  - Total: 1.39 km^{2} (0.54 sq mi)
- Elevation: 339.7 m (1,115 ft)

Population (2002)
  - Total: 173

Koseze (pronounced [kɔˈseːzɛ]; German: Koses) is a small settlement southeast of Vodice on the road to Mengeš in the Upper Carniola region of Slovenia.

== History ==
Together with neighboring Kot and Potok, Koseze was annexed by Šinkov Turn in 1953. However, in 1955 Koseze was made a separate settlement again.
