= Povodje =

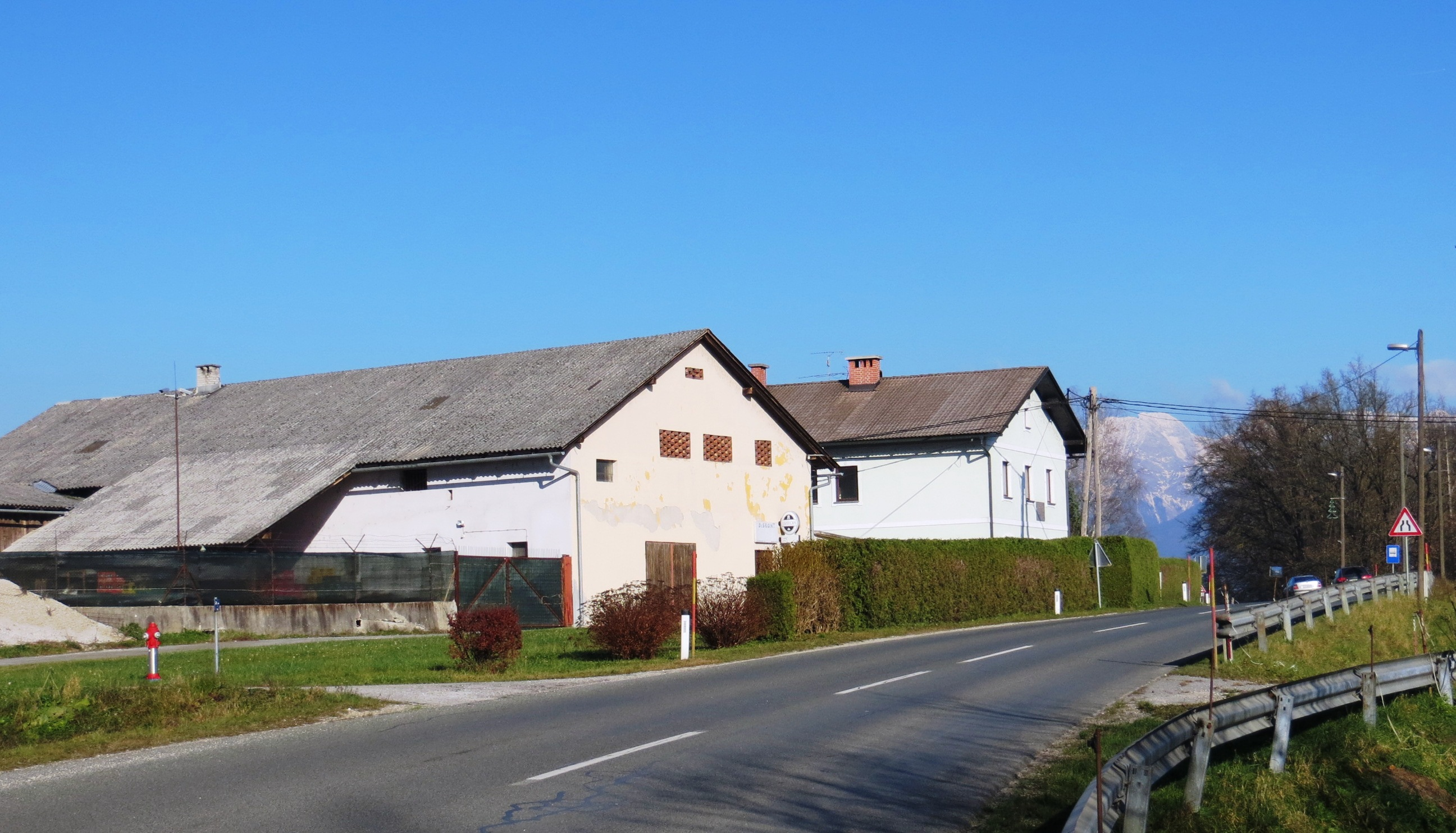

- Location in Slovenia
- Coordinates: 46°8′27.51″N 14°28′39.33″E
- Country: Slovenia
- Traditional region: Upper Carniola
- Statistical region: Central Slovenia
- Municipality: Vodice

Area
  - Total: 1.48 km^{2} (0.57 sq mi)
- Elevation: 324.8 m (1,066 ft)

Population (2002)
  - Total: 17

Povodje (pronounced [pɔˈʋoːdjɛ]) is a small dispersed settlement south of Vodice in the Upper Carniola region of Slovenia. It includes the hamlets of Cestni Rebov and Gmajniški Rebov.

== Geography ==
The settlement consists of two groups of houses in a valley. Little Peak (Slovene: Mali vrh, 485 m) rises above the settlement, and Gameljščica Creek flows through the settlement, fed by two tributaries: Poljšak and Dobraca creeks. The soil is loamy and there are fields on the west side of the settlement.

== History ==
The remains of a Roman fortification in the Povodje attest to early settlement of the area. In 1953, the Slovenian Fishing Association (Slovene: Ribiška zveza Slovenije) built a trout hatchery along Gameljščica Creek at the site of an abandoned mill.

== Cultural heritage ==
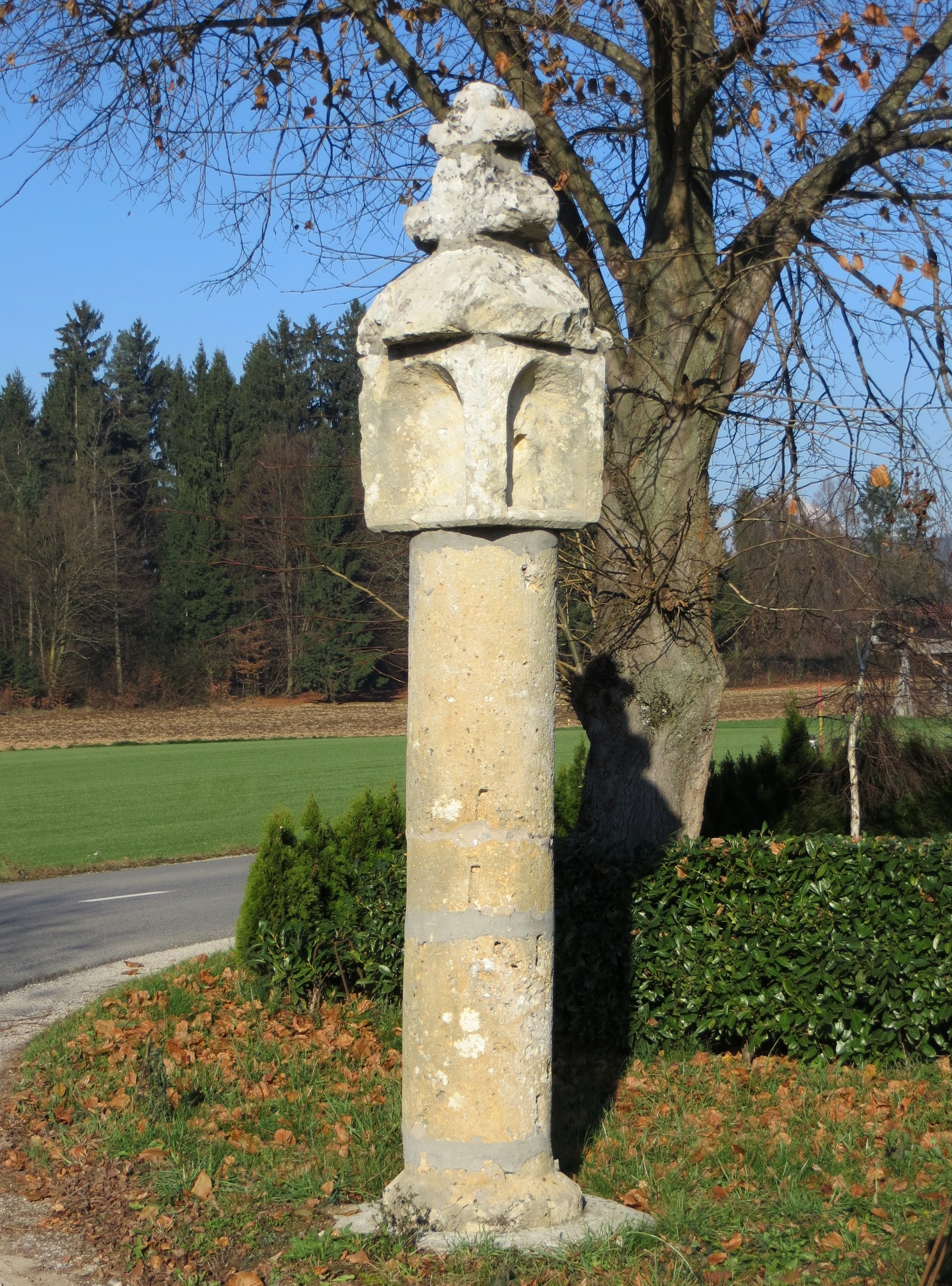
Plague column

A plague column stands at the north edge of the settlement, at the border with neighboring Skaručna and the intersection with the road to Vojsko. The column is carved from sandstone and is believed to date from the 17th century.

== Notable people ==
Notable people that were born or lived in Povodje include:

- Matej Hubad (1866–1937), composer
