= List of cities, towns, and villages in Slovenia: U =

This is a list of cities, towns, and villages in Slovenia, starting with U.

Settlement	Municipality
Učak	Lukovica
Učakovci	Črnomelj
Udje	Grosuplje
Udmat	Laško
Ugovec	Oplotnica
Ukanc	Bohinj
Ukanje	Kanal
Ulaka	Bloke
Ulaka	Velike Lašče
Unec	Cerknica
Unično	Hrastnik
Uniše	Šentjur
Urh	Slovenska Bistrica
Uršlja Gora	Ravne na Koroškem
Uršna sela	Novo mesto
Ustje	Ajdovščina
Utik	Vodice
Utovlje	Sežana
Uzmani	Velike Lašče
