= Kot, Vodice =

Kot
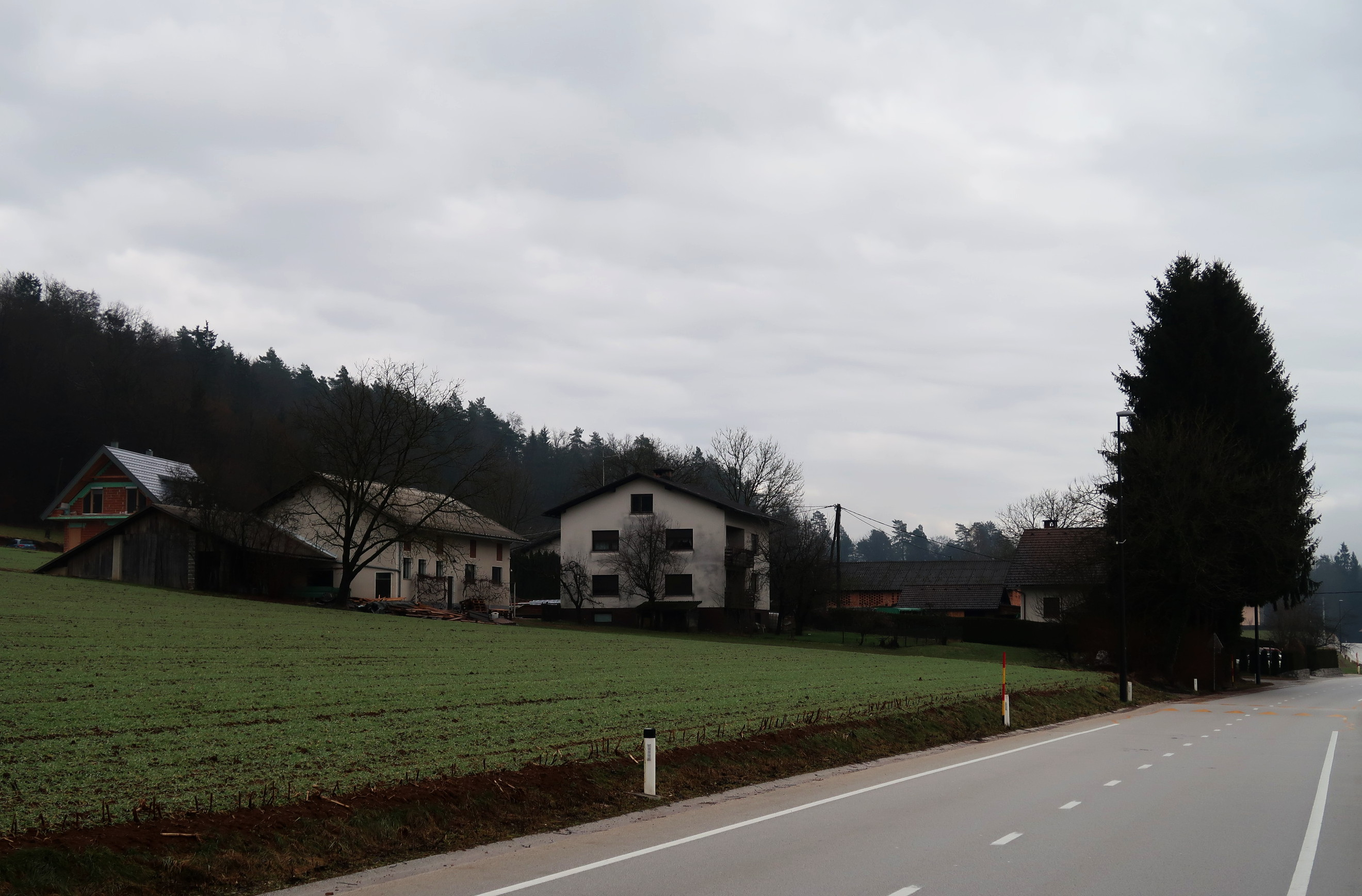

- Location in Slovenia
- Coordinates: 46°10′10″N 14°31′53″E
- Country: Slovenia
- Traditional region: Upper Carniola
- Statistical region: Central Slovenia
- Municipality: Vodice
- Elevation: 336 m (1,102 ft)

Kot (pronounced [ˈkoːt], sometimes Podkot) is a former settlement in the Municipality of Vodice in central Slovenia. It is now part of the village of Koseze. The area is part of the traditional region of Upper Carniola. The municipality is now included in the Central Slovenia Statistical Region.

== Geography ==
Kot stands east of the main settlement of Koseze, along the road to Mengeš at the intersection with a road to Šinkov Turn. Koseze Hill (elevation 467 meters or 1,532 feet) rises above the settlement, with the Strmec Combe cutting into the slope 1 kilometer (0.62 mi) due north.

== Name ==
The name Kot is shared by several villages in Slovenia. It comes from the common noun kot 'closed valley, combe', referring to the place where a valley ends, closed in by mountains or hills. In some older sources, the names of Koseze and Kot were written together as a paired settlement; for example, Kosese in Podkot (German: Koses und Podot), Koseze in Kot (German: Koses und Kot), or Koseze-Kot. The variant name Podkot is a fused prepositional phrase (pod 'below' + kot combe) that has lost case inflection, referring to the Strmec Combe.

== History ==
Together with neighboring Koseze and Potok, Kot was annexed by Šinkov Turn in 1953, ending its existence as an independent settlement. In 1955, Koseze was made a separate settlement again, together with Kot as a hamlet in the settlement.
