= Golo, Vodice =

Golo
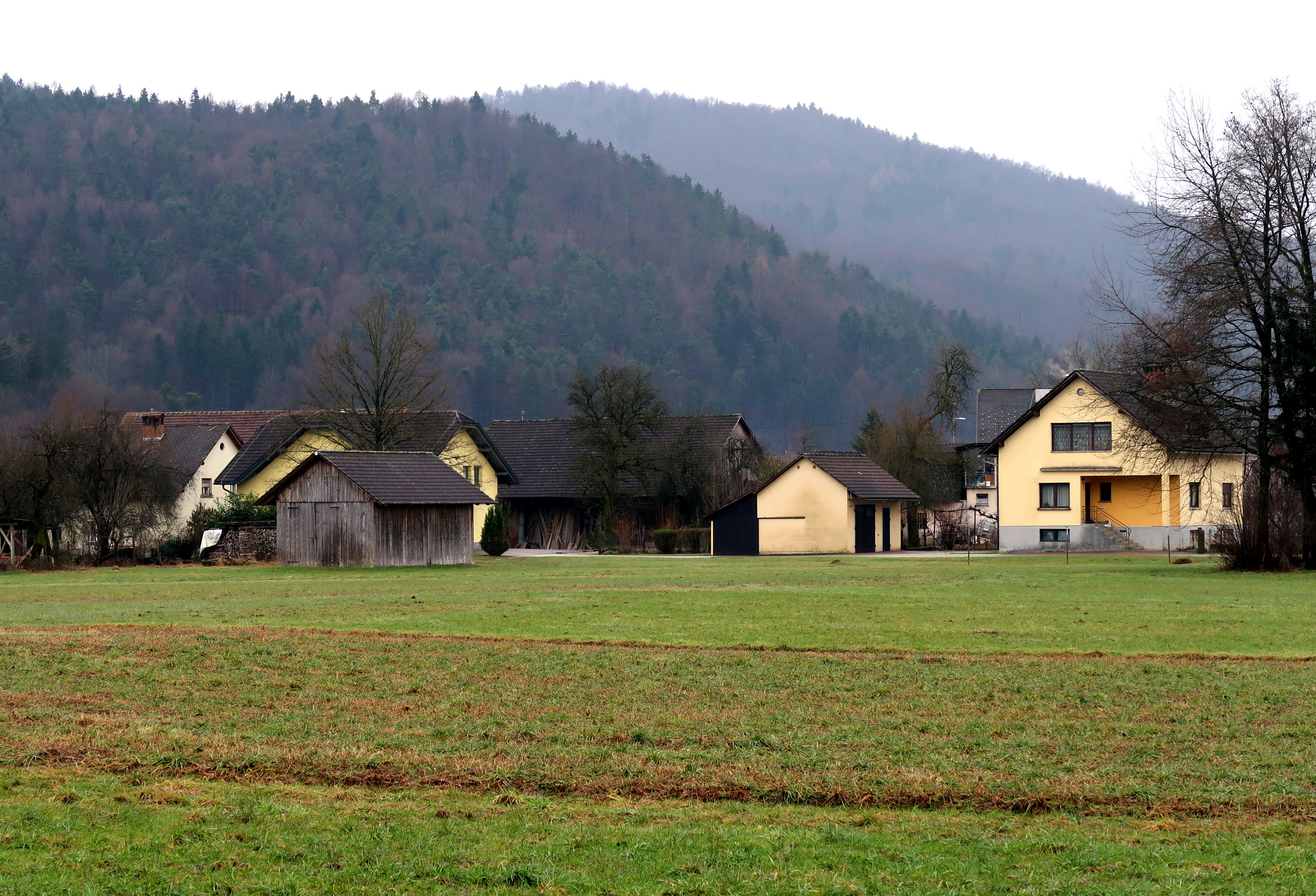

- Location in Slovenia
- Coordinates: 46°08′39″N 14°24′15″E
- Country: Slovenia
- Traditional region: Upper Carniola
- Statistical region: Central Slovenia
- Municipality: Vodice
- Elevation: 330 m (1,080 ft)

Golo (pronounced [ˈɡɔːlɔ], German: Golu) is a former settlement in the Municipality of Vodice in central Slovenia. It is now part of the village of Selo pri Vodicah. The area is part of the traditional region of Upper Carniola. The municipality is now included in the Central Slovenia Statistical Region.

== Geography ==
Golo lies in the Skaručna Basin northeast of Selo pri Vodicah. The soil is loamy.

== Name ==
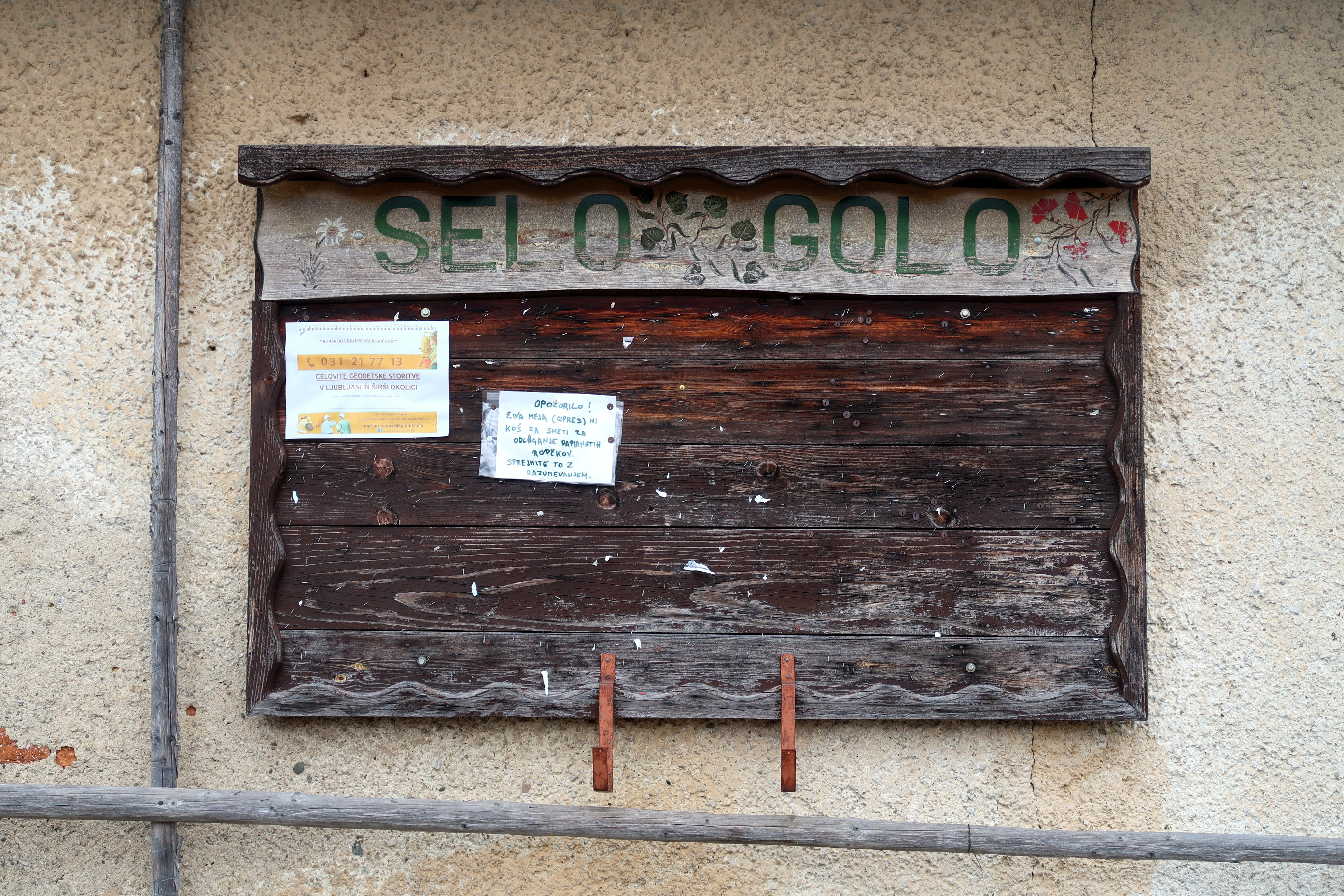
A signboard for Golo

The name Golo is derived from the Slovene adjective gol 'bare', referring to a place where the forest was cleared. In some older sources, the names of Golo and Selo were written together as a paired settlement; for example, Selo-Golo or Selo in Golo (German: Sela und Golu).

== History ==
Golo was annexed by Selo pri Vodicah in 1953, ending its existence as an independent settlement.
