= Potočna Vas =

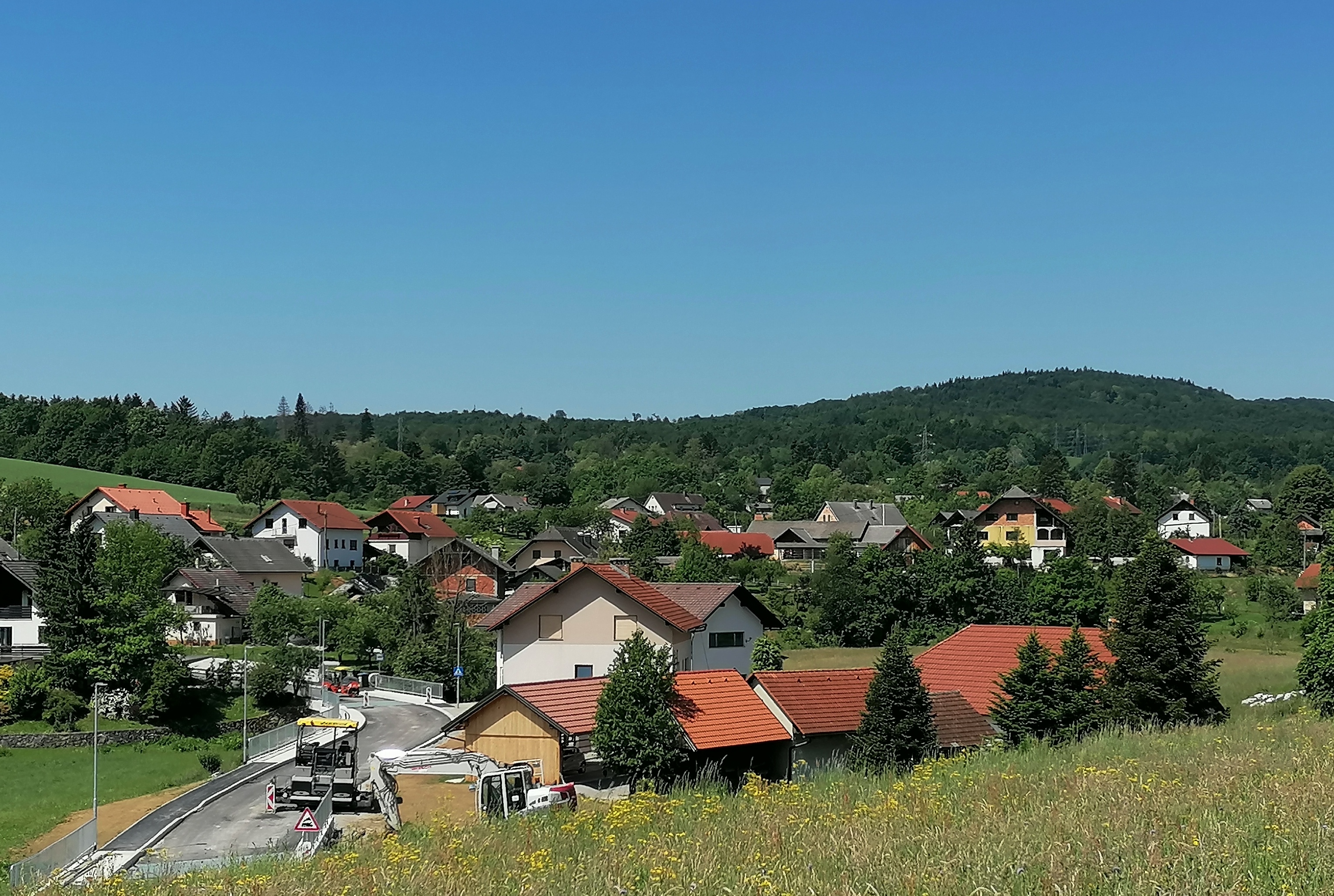

- Location in Slovenia
- Coordinates: 45°49′34″N 15°08′39″E
- Country: Slovenia
- Traditional region: Lower Carniola
- Statistical region: Southwest Slovenia
- Municipality: Novo Mesto
- Elevation: 175 m (574 ft)

Potočna Vas (pronounced [pɔˈtoːtʃna ˈʋaːs]; Slovene: Potočna vas, in older sources also Potočarska vas, German: Pototschendorf) is a former village in southeastern Slovenia in the Municipality of Novo Mesto. It is now part of the city of Novo Mesto. It is part of the traditional region of Lower Carniola and is now included in the Southeast Slovenia Statistical Region.

== Geography ==
Potočna Vas is a clustered settlement about 3.2 kilometers (2.0 mi) northwest of the city center of Novo Mesto. It lies on the right bank of Bršljin Creek (Slovene: Bršljinski potok), which borders it to the northeast, and along the railway line from Ljubljana to Metlika, which largely borders it to the southwest.

== Name ==
The name Potočna Vas means 'creek village' and refers to Bršljin Creek. The toponym is related to other Slovene place names referring to a creek, such as Potok and Potoče. The older variant name Potočarska vas (literally, 'Potočar village') is surname-based, referring to a place inhabited by people named Potočar (i.e., 'person living on a creek'). The surname Potočar was found in the village in the past.

== History ==
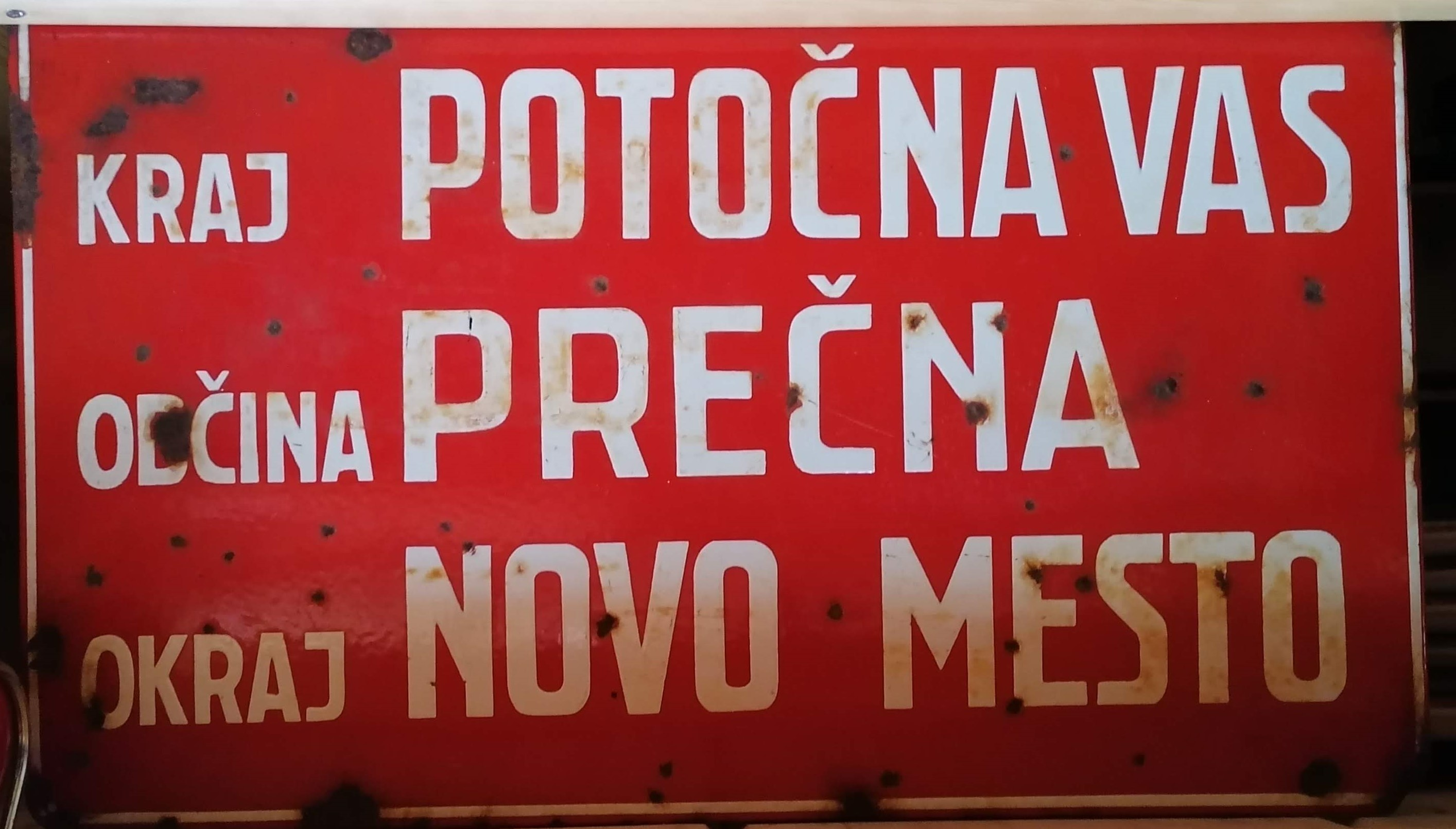
Former settlement border sign (from c. 1953)

In the past, there were mills in Potočna Vas located along Bršljin Creek. Potočna Vas was annexed by the city of Novo Mesto in 1979, ending its existence as an independent settlement.
