= Jakob Alešovec =

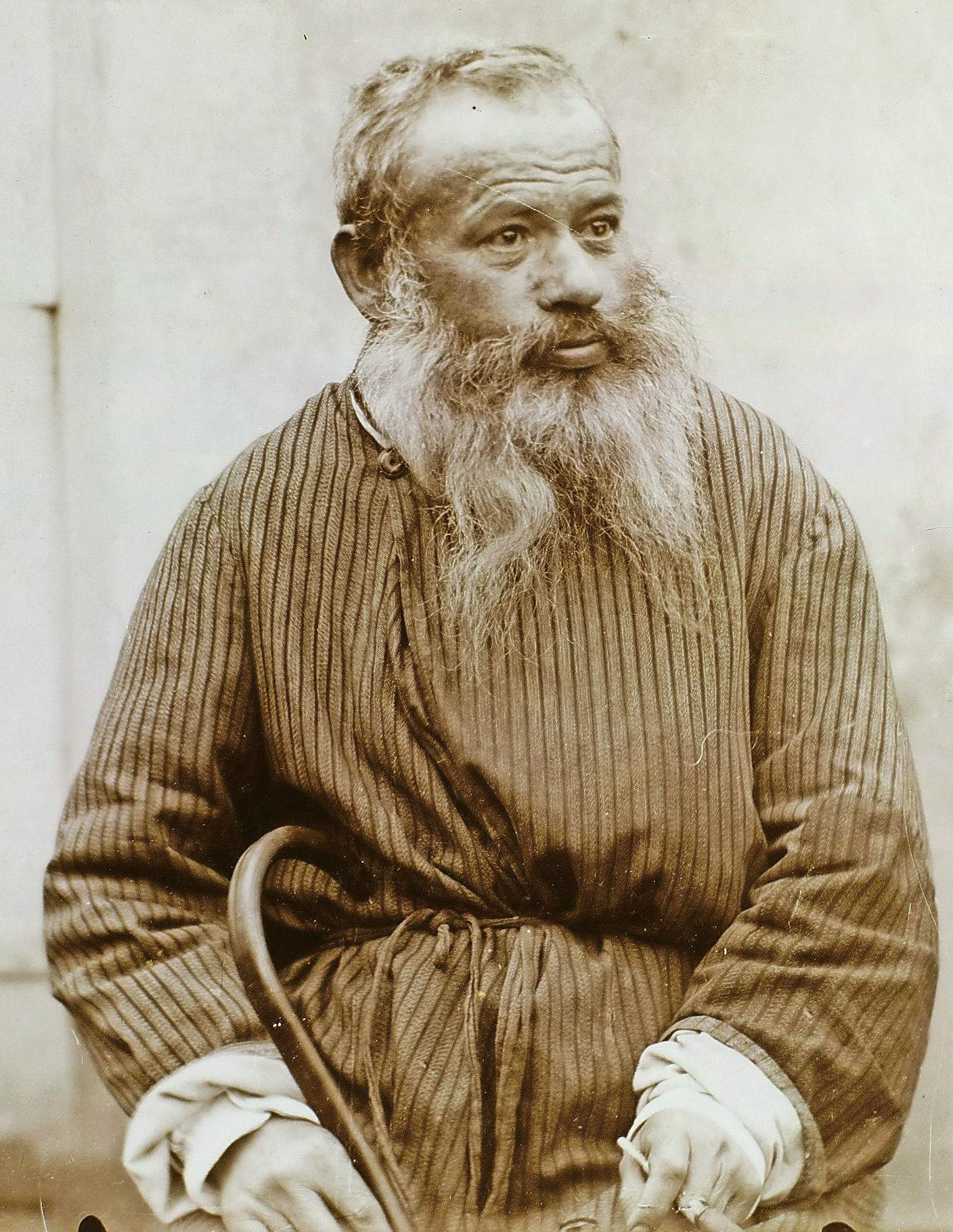
Jakob Alešovec

Jakob Alešovec (pronounced [ˈjaːkɔp aˈleːʃɔʋəts]; 24 July 1842, Skaručna – 17 October 1901, Ljubljana) was an ethnic Slovene-Austrian writer and playwright. Until 1866, Alešovec wrote in German, but later switched to Slovenian. He wrote travelogues, tales, folk plays, and satires, as well as the first Slovenian detective story. In 1868, he published the German-language novella Laibacher Mysterien (The Mysteries of Ljubljana) inspired by Eugène Sue's Les Mystères de Paris (The Mysteries of Paris).

== Works ==
- Laibacher Mysterien (1868) – The Mysteries of Ljubljana
- Iz sodnijskega življenja (1875) – From the Judges Life
- Kako sem se jaz likal (1884) – How I Was Ironing Myself
