= Polje pri Vodicah =

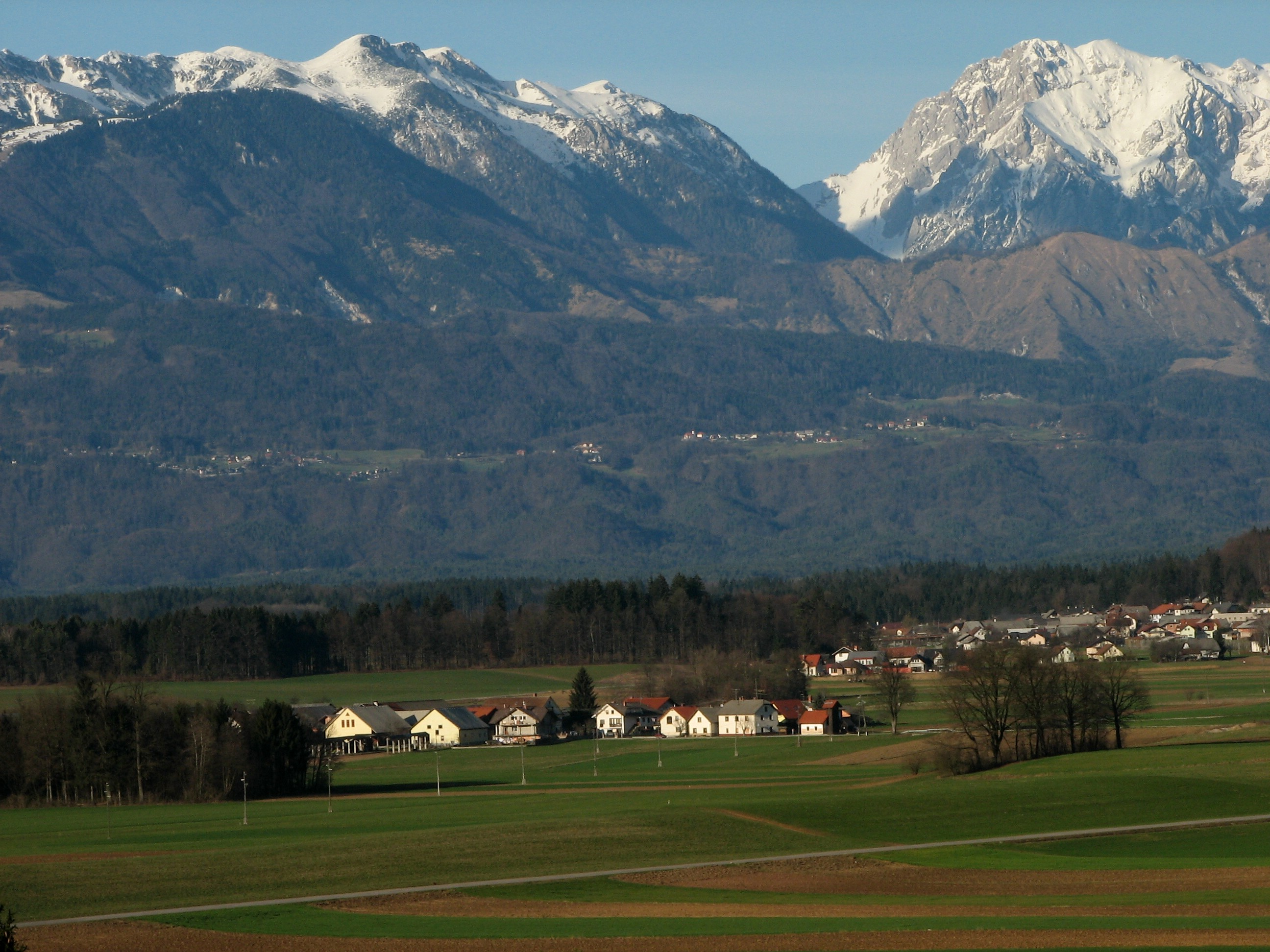

- Location in Slovenia
- Coordinates: 46°9′47.1″N 14°29′32.66″E
- Country: Slovenia
- Traditional region: Upper Carniola
- Statistical region: Central Slovenia
- Municipality: Vodice

Area
  - Total: 1.67 km^{2} (0.64 sq mi)
- Elevation: 323.8 m (1,062 ft)

Population (2002)
  - Total: 211

Polje pri Vodicah (pronounced [ˈpoːljɛ pɾi ʋɔˈdiːtsax]; German: Pole) is a village south of Vodice in the Upper Carniola region of Slovenia.

== Name ==
The name of the settlement was changed from Polje to Polje pri Vodicah in 1955. In the past the German name was Pole.
