= Golo =

Golo may refer to:

== Places ==
- Golo (river), Corsica, France
- Golo (department), a former department of France on Corsica
- Golo Island, a part of the municipality of Looc, Occidental Mindoro, Philippines
- Golo, Ig, a settlement in the municipality of Ig, Slovenia
- Golo, Vodice, a former settlement in the municipality of Vodice, Slovenia
- Golo, Sudan, a town in Darfur
- Golo, Kentucky, an unincorporated community, United States

== People ==
- Golo (footballer), Spanish retired footballer Óscar Santor Martínez (born 1978)
- Golo Mann (1909–1994), German historian and writer born Angelus Mann, son of Thomas Mann

== Other uses ==
- Golo Footwear, an American shoe manufacturer
- Golo (programming language)
- Golo, who falsely claimed to be the lover of Genevieve of Brabant of medieval legend

== See also ==
- Gollo people, an ethnic group in Western Bahr el Ghazal, Sudan
