= Ulaka =

Ulaka may refer to:

== People ==
- Ramachandra Ulaka (1934–2011), Indian politician
- Saptagiri Sankar Ulaka (born 1979), Indian politician

== Places ==
- Ulaka, Bloke, village in Slovenia
- Ulaka, Velike Lašče, village in Slovenia
- Ulaka, an island in the Duff Islands, Solomon Islands

== See also ==
- Ulka (disambiguation)
