= Dornice =

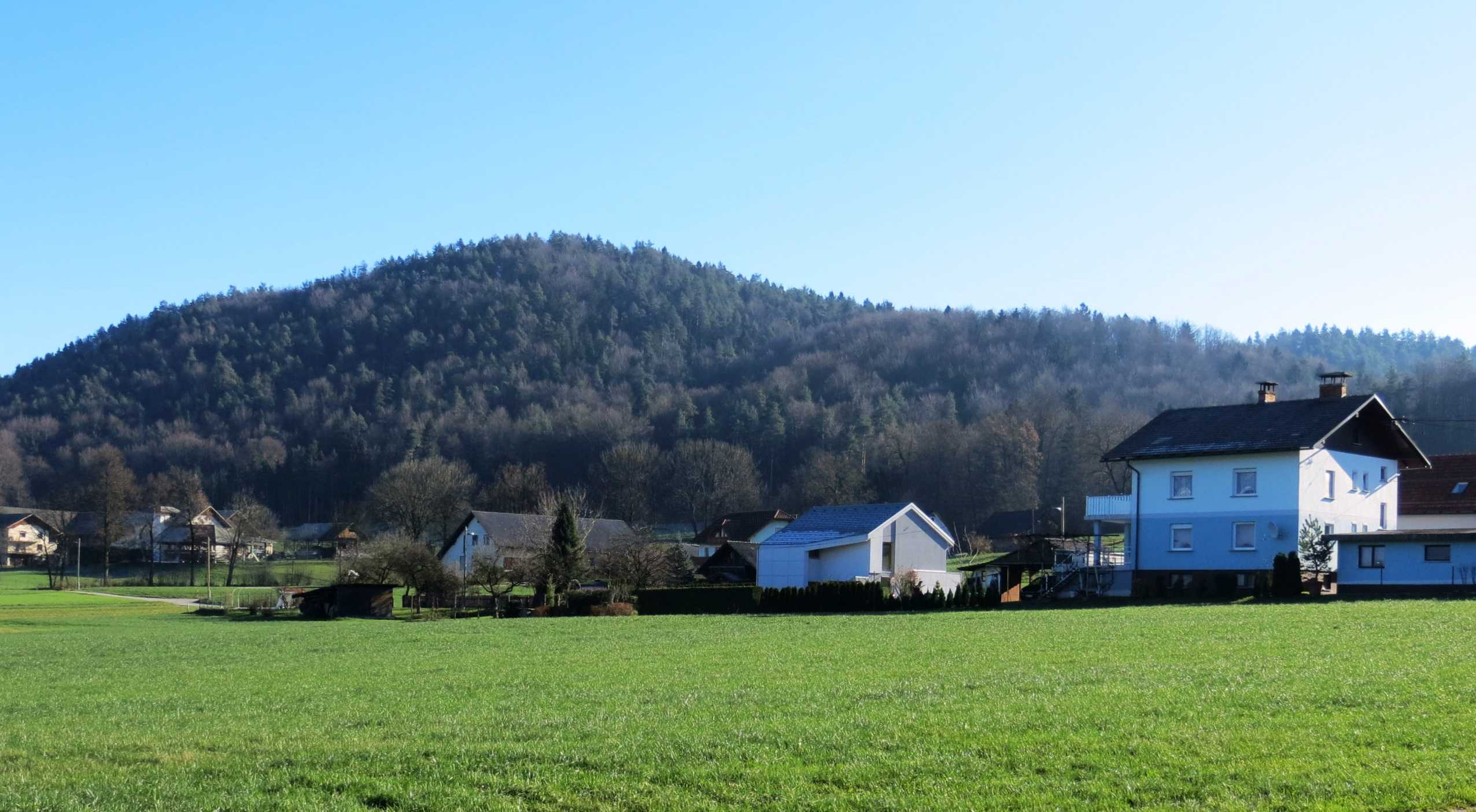

- Location in Slovenia
- Coordinates: 46°10′30.1″N 14°28′3.65″E
- Country: Slovenia
- Traditional region: Upper Carniola
- Statistical region: Central Slovenia
- Municipality: Vodice

Area
  - Total: 0.93 km^{2} (0.36 sq mi)
- Elevation: 351.8 m (1,154 ft)

Population (2002)
  - Total: 65

Dornice (pronounced [ˈdoːɾnitsɛ]) is a small settlement southwest of Vodice in the Upper Carniola region of Slovenia.
