= Vojsko, Vodice =

Vojsko
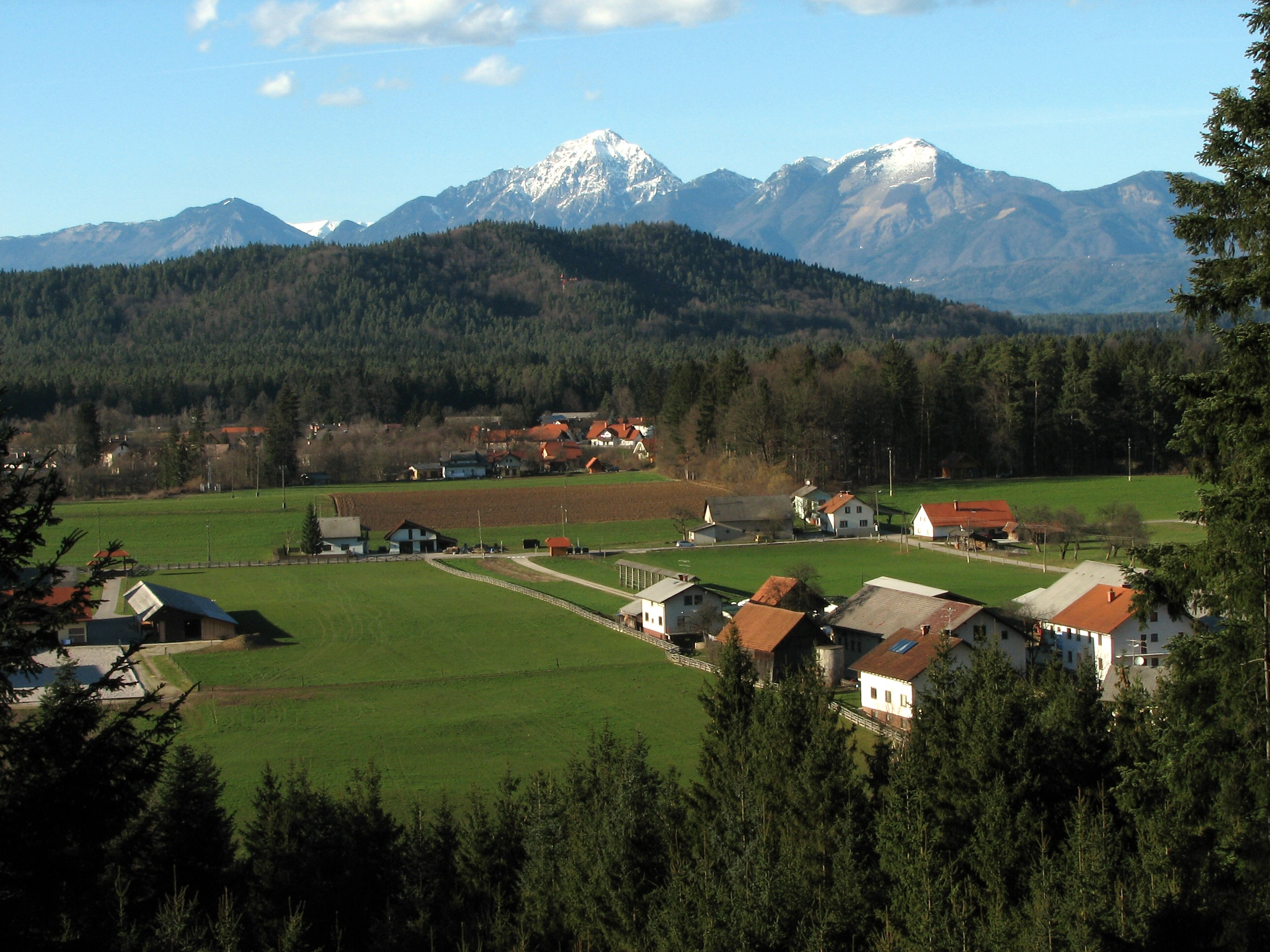

- Location in Slovenia
- Coordinates: 46°08′52″N 14°29′19″E
- Country: Slovenia
- Traditional region: Upper Carniola
- Statistical region: Central Slovenia
- Municipality: Vodice

Area
  - Total: 1.56 km^{2} (0.60 sq mi)
- Elevation: 322 m (1,056 ft)

Population (2002)
  - Total: 134

Vojsko (pronounced [ˈʋɔːi̯skɔ] or [ˈʋoːi̯skɔ]) is a settlement next to Skaručna in the Municipality of Vodice in the Upper Carniola region of Slovenia. It lies at the southwest end of the Skaručna Basin (Slovene: Skaruško polje).
