= Zapoge =

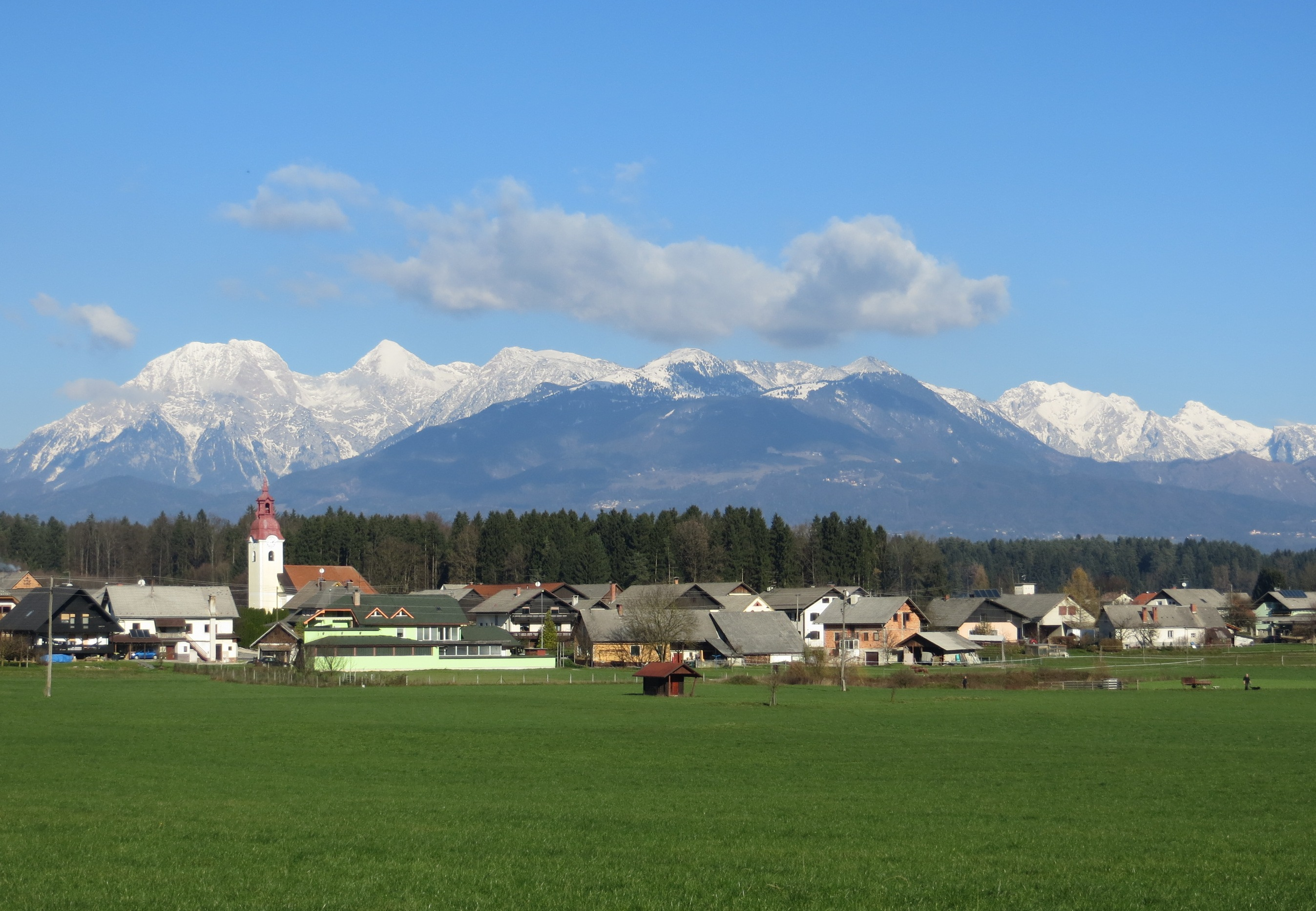

- Location in Slovenia
- Coordinates: 46°10′46.62″N 14°28′3.51″E
- Country: Slovenia
- Traditional region: Upper Carniola
- Statistical region: Central Slovenia
- Municipality: Vodice

Area
  - Total: 1.15 km^{2} (0.44 sq mi)
- Elevation: 337.5 m (1,107 ft)

Population (2002)
  - Total: 221

Zapoge (pronounced [zaˈpoːɡɛ]; German: Seebach) is a settlement in the Municipality of Vodice in the Upper Carniola region of Slovenia.

== Name ==
Zapoge was attested in written sources in 1330 as Zapaum (and as Zapozech in 1426, Sapokch in 1436, and hof zu Sepach and Sapose in 1458). The name is of uncertain origin. Based on medieval attestations, the current name originated as a plural accusative. In the local dialect, the settlement is known as Zəpọ́ge. In the past the German name was Seebach.

== Church ==
The local church is dedicated to Saint Nicholas and contains one of the oldest surviving pipe organs in Slovenia.

== Notable people ==
Notable people that were born or lived in Zapoge include:

- Matija Bilban (1863–1937), Catholic priest and missionary to the United States
