= Potok, Vodice =

Potok
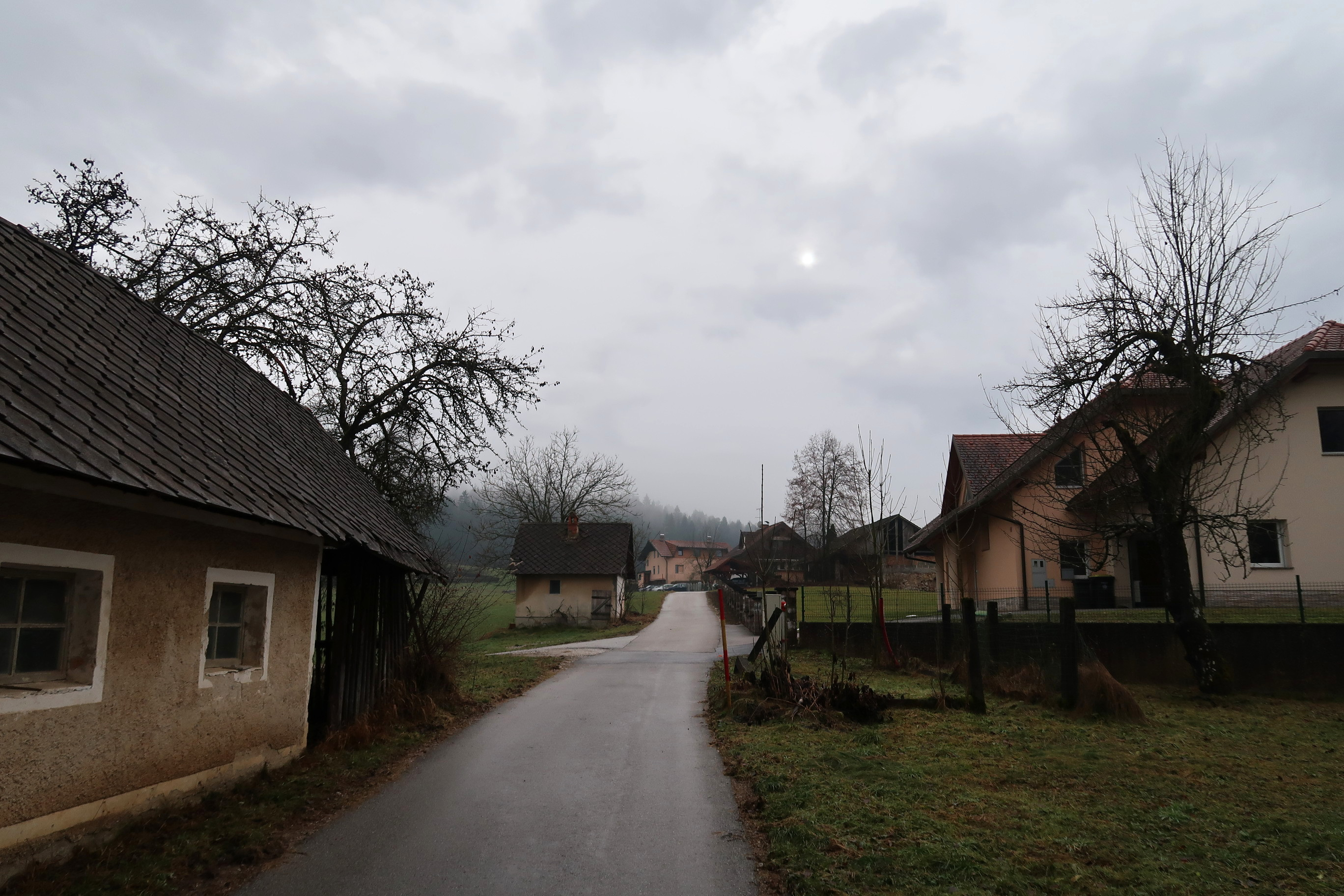

- Location in Slovenia
- Coordinates: 46°09′49″N 14°32′04″E
- Country: Slovenia
- Traditional region: Upper Carniola
- Statistical region: Central Slovenia
- Municipality: Vodice
- Elevation: 337 m (1,106 ft)

Potok (pronounced [ˈpɔːtɔk]) is a former settlement in the Municipality of Vodice in central Slovenia. It is now part of the village of Šinkov Turn. The area is part of the traditional region of Upper Carniola. The municipality is now included in the Central Slovenia Statistical Region.

== Geography ==
Potok lies in the Skaručna Basin east of the center of Šinkov Turn. It consists of two parts: Zgornji Potok ('upper Potok') and Spodnji Potok ('lower Potok'). A tributary of Graben Creek flows west of Potok.

== Name ==
The name Potok comes from the Slovene common noun potok 'creek'. Toponyms containing the element potok 'creek' are common in Slovenia. In some older sources, the names of Potok and Šinkov Turn were written together as a paired settlement; for example, Potok-Šinkovturn (German: Potok-Schenkenthurn).

== History ==
Potok was annexed by Šinkov Turn in 1953, ending its existence as an independent settlement.
