= Ulka =

Ulka may refer to:

- Ulka Gupta (born 1997), Indian film and television actress
- Ulka Sasaki (born 1989), Japanese mixed martial artist
- DRDO Ulka, Indian air-launched expendable target drone
- BNS Ulka, establishment of the Bangladeshi Navy
- Ulka (novel), Bengali novel by Nihar Ranjan Gupta published in 1959
- Krasnaya Ulka, administrative center of Krasnoulskoye Rural Settlementin Russia

== See also ==
- Ulaka (disambiguation)
