= Vesca =

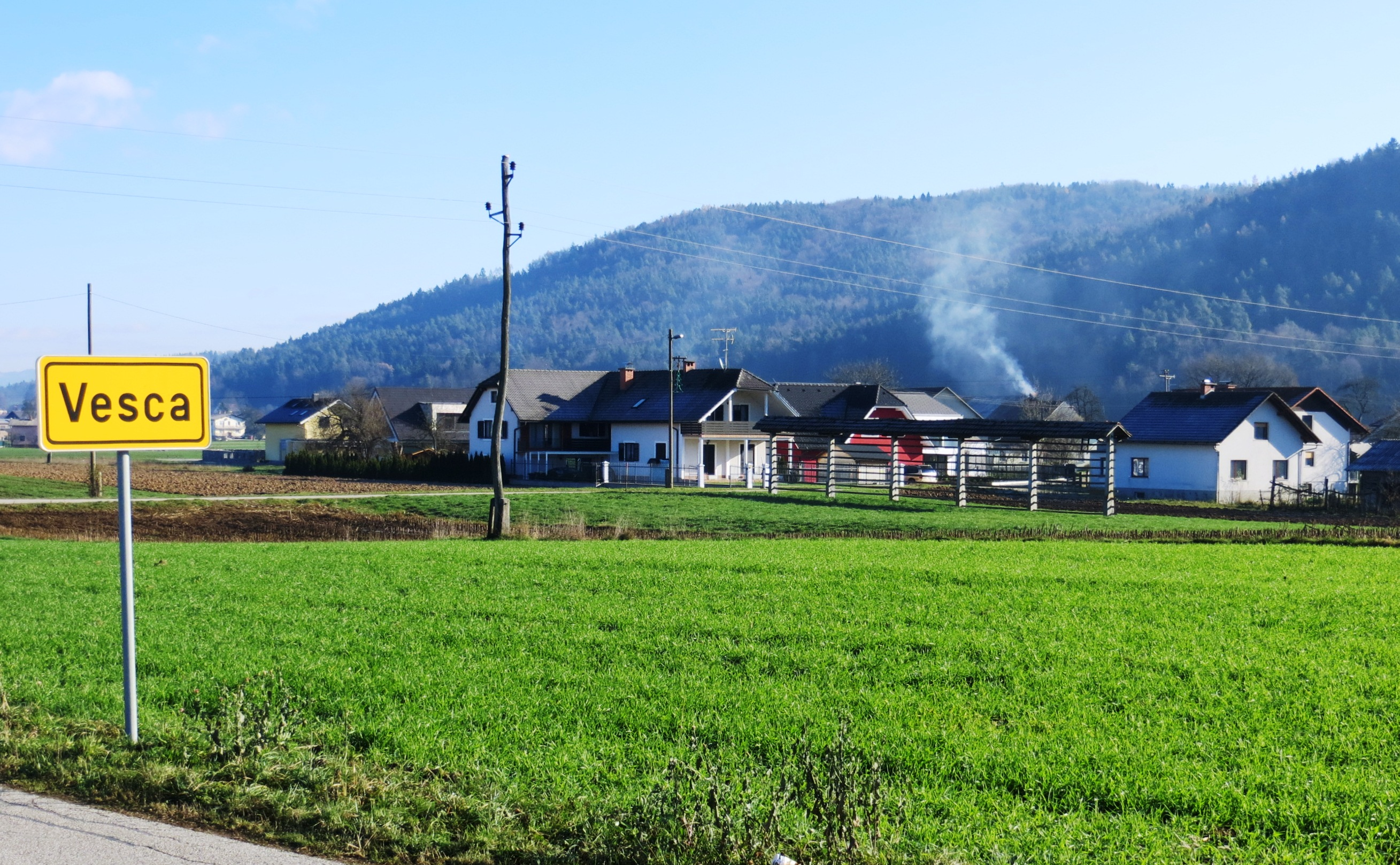

- Location in Slovenia
- Coordinates: 46°9′20.78″N 14°30′27.9″E
- Country: Slovenia
- Traditional region: Upper Carniola
- Statistical region: Central Slovenia
- Municipality: Vodice

Area
  - Total: 2.65 km^{2} (1.02 sq mi)
- Elevation: 322.3 m (1,057 ft)

Population (2002)
  - Total: 53

Vesca (pronounced [ˈʋeːstsa]; in older sources also Vesce), German: Wesze is a small settlement in the Municipality of Vodice in the Upper Carniola region of Slovenia. It lies in the middle of the Skaručna Basin (Slovene: Skaruško polje).

== Notable people ==
Notable people that were born or lived in Vesca include:

- Matija Koželj (1842–1917), painter
