= Bukovica pri Vodicah =

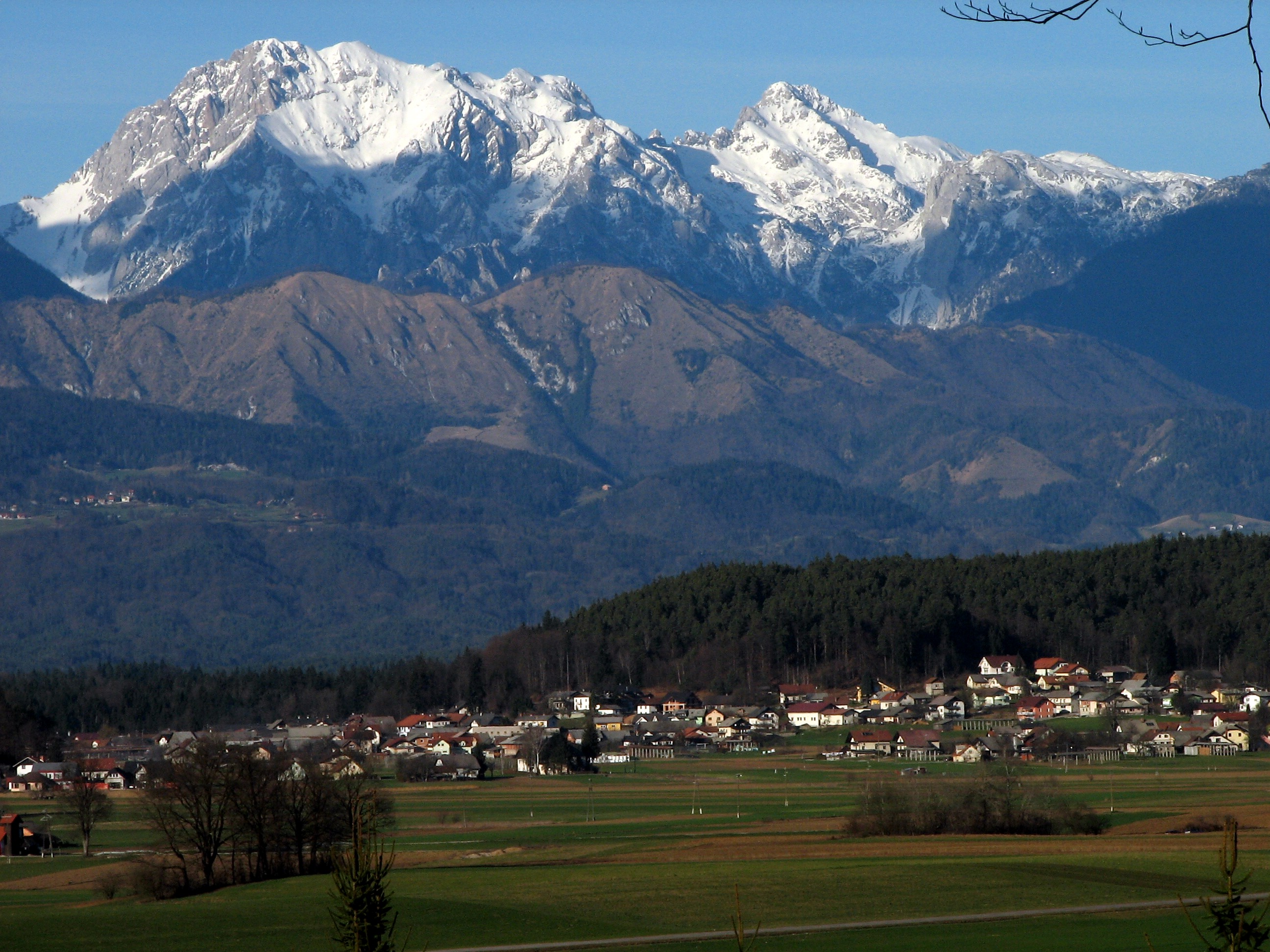

- Location in Slovenia
- Coordinates: 46°10′26.19″N 14°30′22.19″E
- Country: Slovenia
- Traditional region: Upper Carniola
- Statistical region: Central Slovenia
- Municipality: Vodice

Area
  - Total: 3.48 km^{2} (1.34 sq mi)
- Elevation: 327.1 m (1,073 ft)

Population (2002)
  - Total: 370

Bukovica pri Vodicah (pronounced [ˈbuːkɔʋitsa pɾi ʋɔˈdiːtsax]; in older sources also Bukovca, German: Bukowitz) is a settlement in the Municipality of Vodice in the Upper Carniola region of Slovenia.

== Name ==
The name of the settlement was changed from Bukovica to Bukovica pri Vodicah (literally, 'Bukovica near Vodice') in 1953. Bukovica is a common toponym and oronym in Slovenia. It is derived from the adjective bukov 'beech' (from bukev 'beech tree') and originally referred to the local vegetation. In the past the German name was Bukowitz.
