= Dobruša =

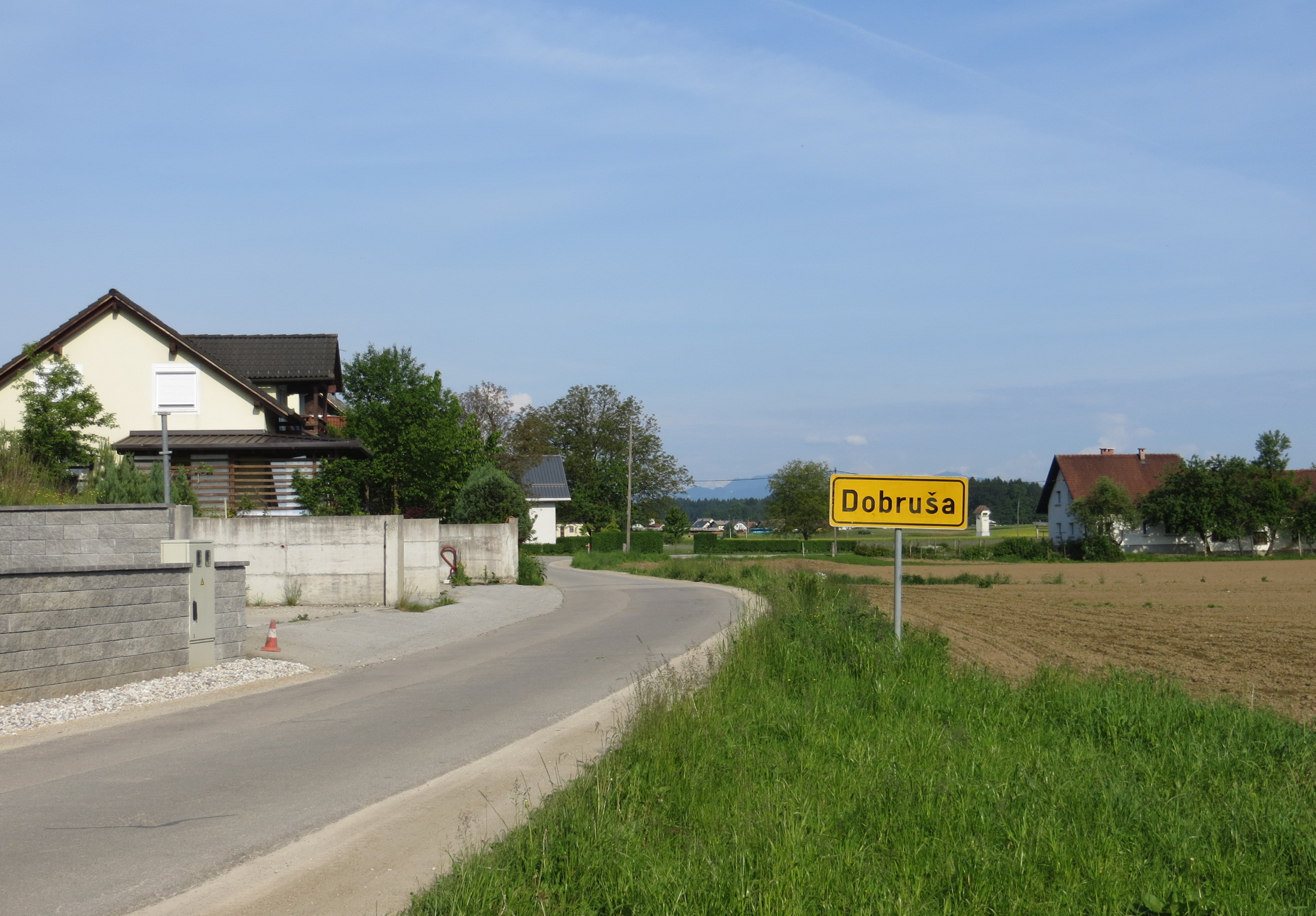

- Location in Slovenia
- Coordinates: 46°10′39.41″N 14°28′55.34″E
- Country: Slovenia
- Traditional region: Upper Carniola
- Statistical region: Central Slovenia
- Municipality: Vodice

Area
  - Total: 0.91 km^{2} (0.35 sq mi)
- Elevation: 332.6 m (1,091 ft)

Population (2002)
  - Total: 104

Dobruša (pronounced [dɔˈbɾuːʃa]) is a small settlement in the Municipality of Vodice in the Upper Carniola region of Slovenia.
