= Torovo =

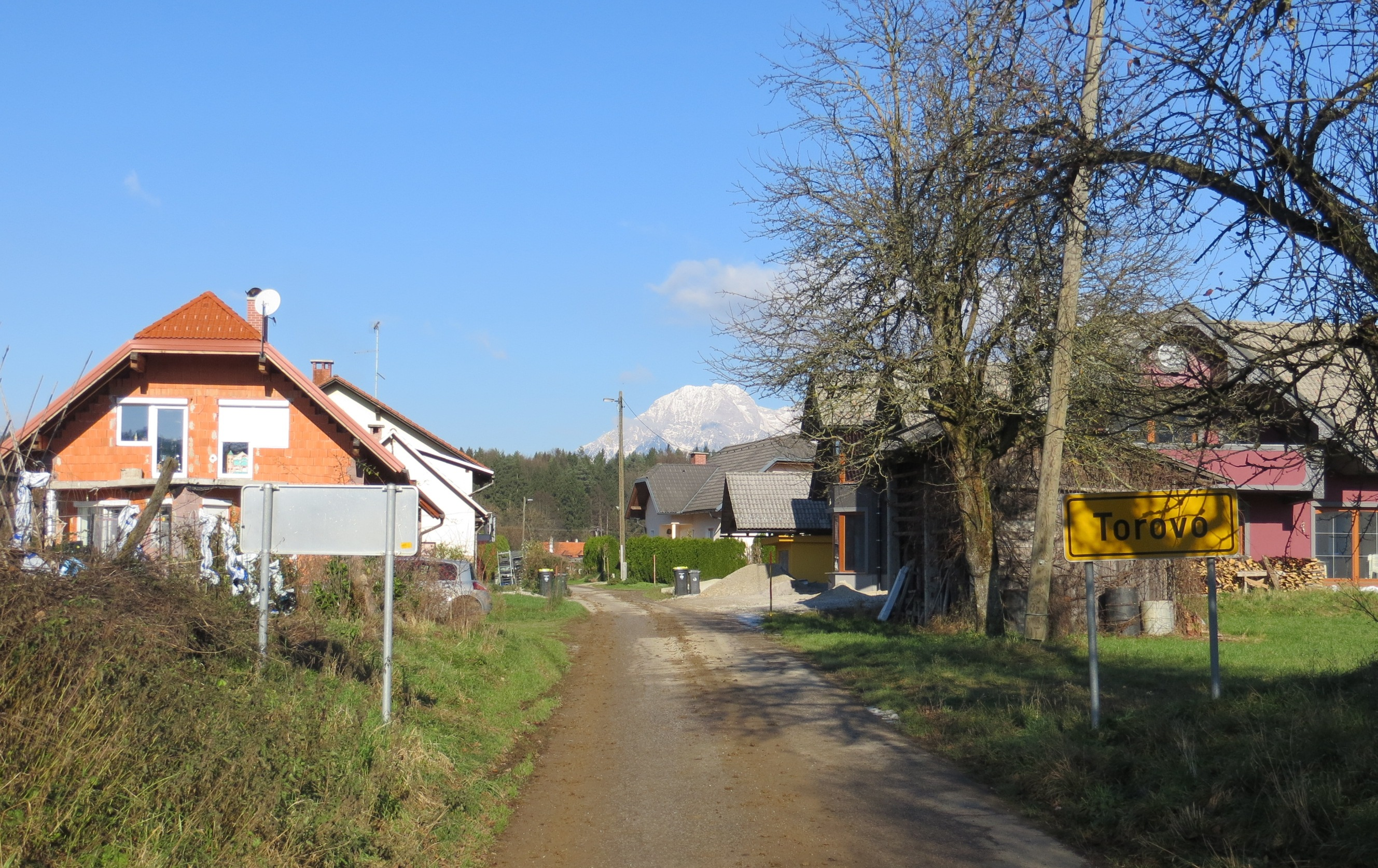

- Location in Slovenia
- Coordinates: 46°11′10.02″N 14°28′19.61″E
- Country: Slovenia
- Traditional region: Upper Carniola
- Statistical region: Central Slovenia
- Municipality: Vodice

Area
  - Total: 2.02 km^{2} (0.78 sq mi)
- Elevation: 342.3 m (1,123 ft)

Population (2002)
  - Total: 32

Torovo (pronounced [ˈtoːɾɔʋɔ]) is a small settlement in the Municipality of Vodice in the Upper Carniola region of Slovenia. The main motorway from Ljubljana to Jesenice passes east of the settlement and towards the north a dense forest extends to Voglje.
