= Skaručna Basin =

Coordinates: 46°09′30″N 14°30′15″E

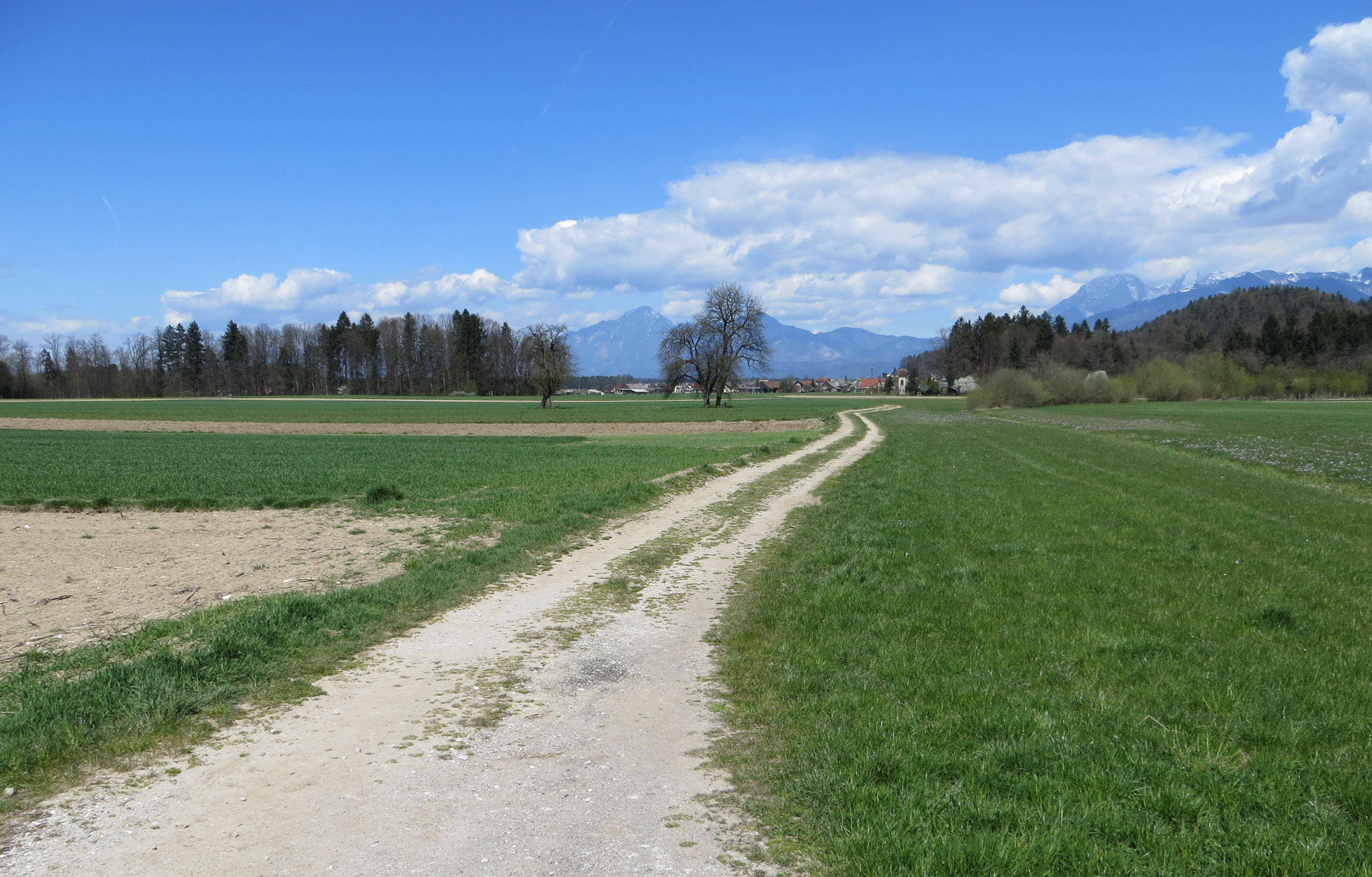
The Skaručna Basin at Selo pri Vodicah

The Skaručna Basin (pronounced [skaˈɾuːtʃna]; Slovene: Skaruško polje) is part of the Ljubljana Basin in Slovenia.

== Geography ==
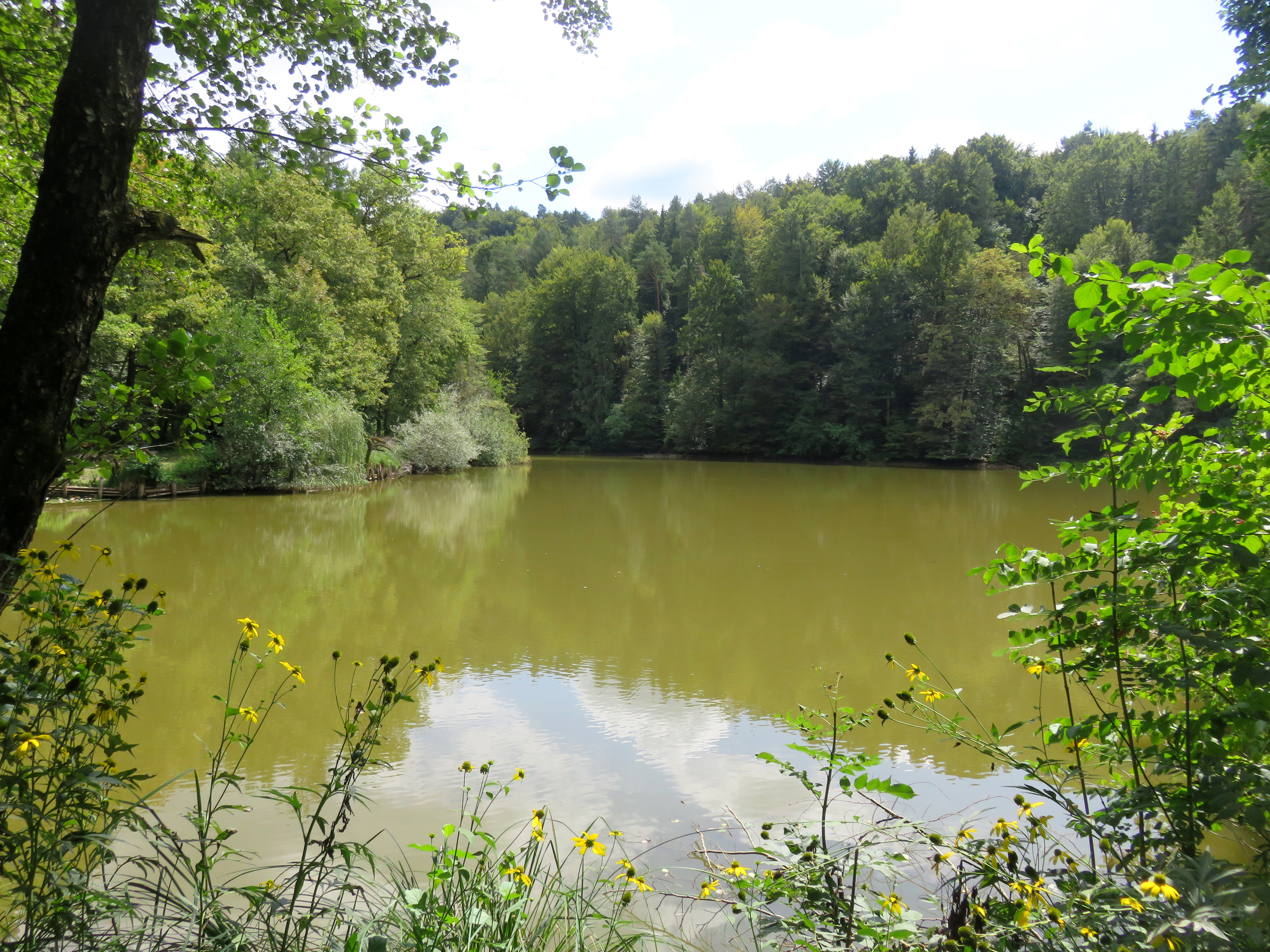
Loess Pond in the Skaručna Basin

The Skaručna Basin has a characteristic mixed cultural landscape, with meadows, tilled fields, pastures, watercourses, vegetation corridors, hedgerows, isolated hills, and settlements on the edge of the floodplain. Graben Creek starts at Loess Pond (Slovene: Phliški bajer or Puhliški bajer, also known as Koseze Pond, Koseški bajer) in the northeast part of the basin; the pond is a former clay pit created about 200 years ago where ice was also harvested until the First World War. Graben Creek runs along the southeast edge of the basin, fed by Brodnek Spring, Smrekar Spring (Slovene: Smrekarjev studenec), and Štefan Spring (Slovene: Štefanov studenec) The basin includes the settlements of Vojsko, Skaručna, Vesca, Selo pri Vodicah, and Šinkov Turn.
