= Selo pri Vodicah =

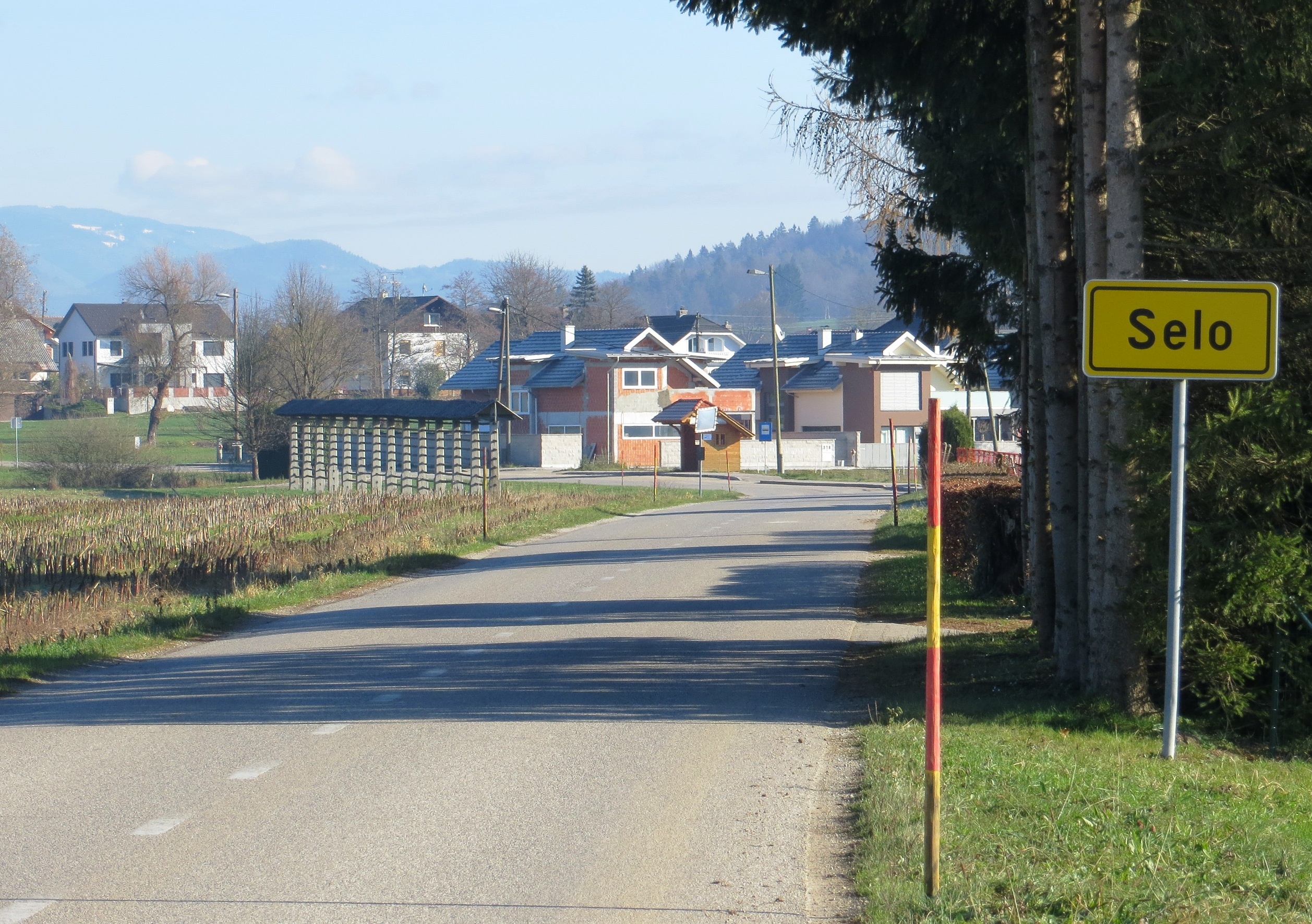

- Location in Slovenia
- Coordinates: 46°9′31.58″N 14°30′54.37″E
- Country: Slovenia
- Traditional region: Upper Carniola
- Statistical region: Central Slovenia
- Municipality: Vodice

Area
  - Total: 1.22 km^{2} (0.47 sq mi)
- Elevation: 322.6 m (1,058 ft)

Population (2002)
  - Total: 220

Selo pri Vodicah (pronounced [ˈsɛːlɔ pɾi ʋɔˈdiːtsax]) is a small settlement in the Municipality of Vodice, just north of Ljubljana, in the Upper Carniola region of Slovenia. It lies in the northeast part of the Skaručna Basin (Slovene: Skaruško polje).

== Name ==
The name of the settlement was changed from Selo to Selo pri Vodicah in 1953.
