= Utik, Vodice =

Utik
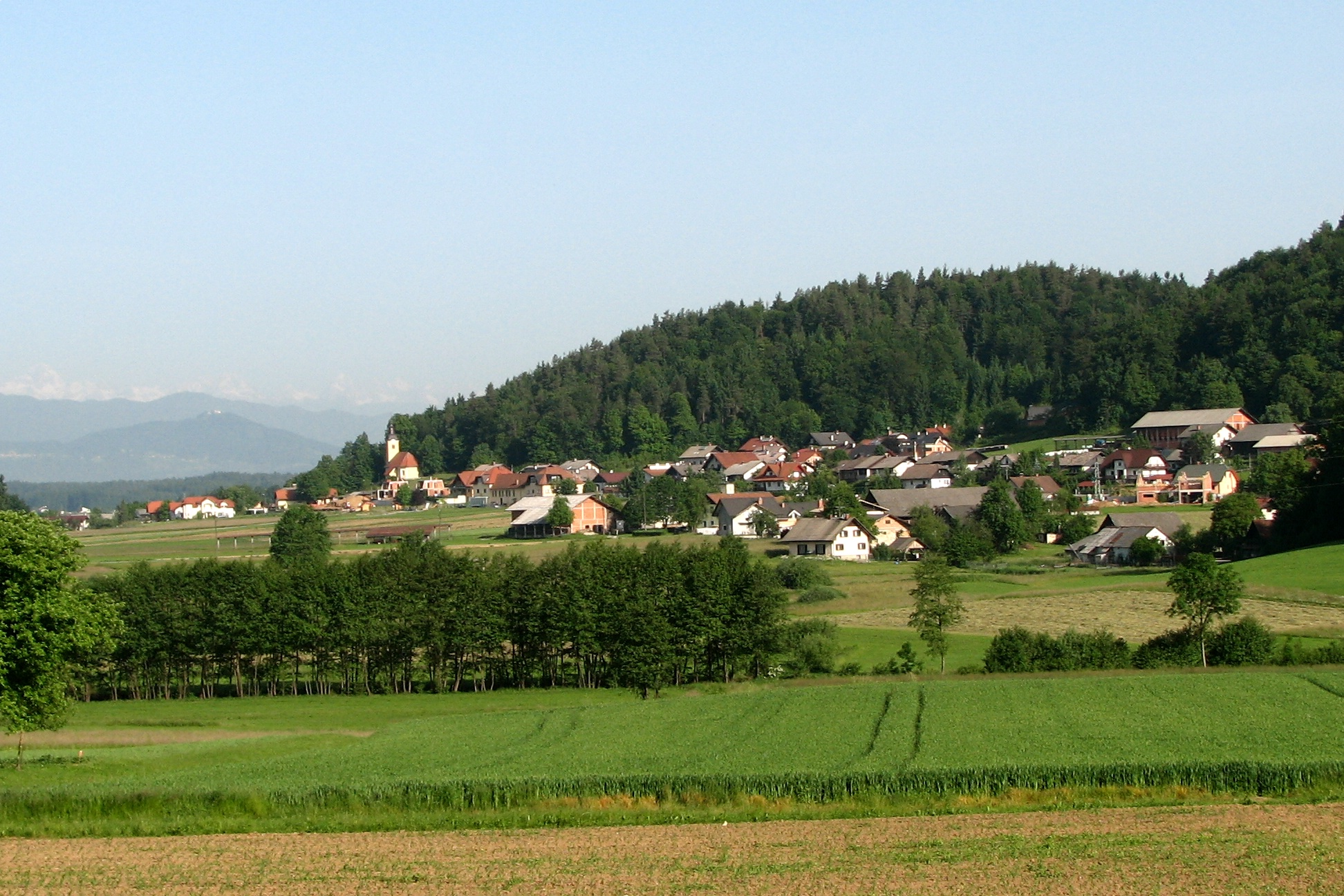

- Location in Slovenia
- Coordinates: 46°10′11.06″N 14°30′44.23″E
- Country: Slovenia
- Traditional region: Upper Carniola
- Statistical region: Central Slovenia
- Municipality: Vodice

Area
  - Total: 1.24 km^{2} (0.48 sq mi)
- Elevation: 348.7 m (1,144 ft)

Population (2002)
  - Total: 378

Utik (pronounced [uˈtiːk]) is a village in the Municipality of Vodice in the Upper Carniola region of Slovenia.

== Church ==
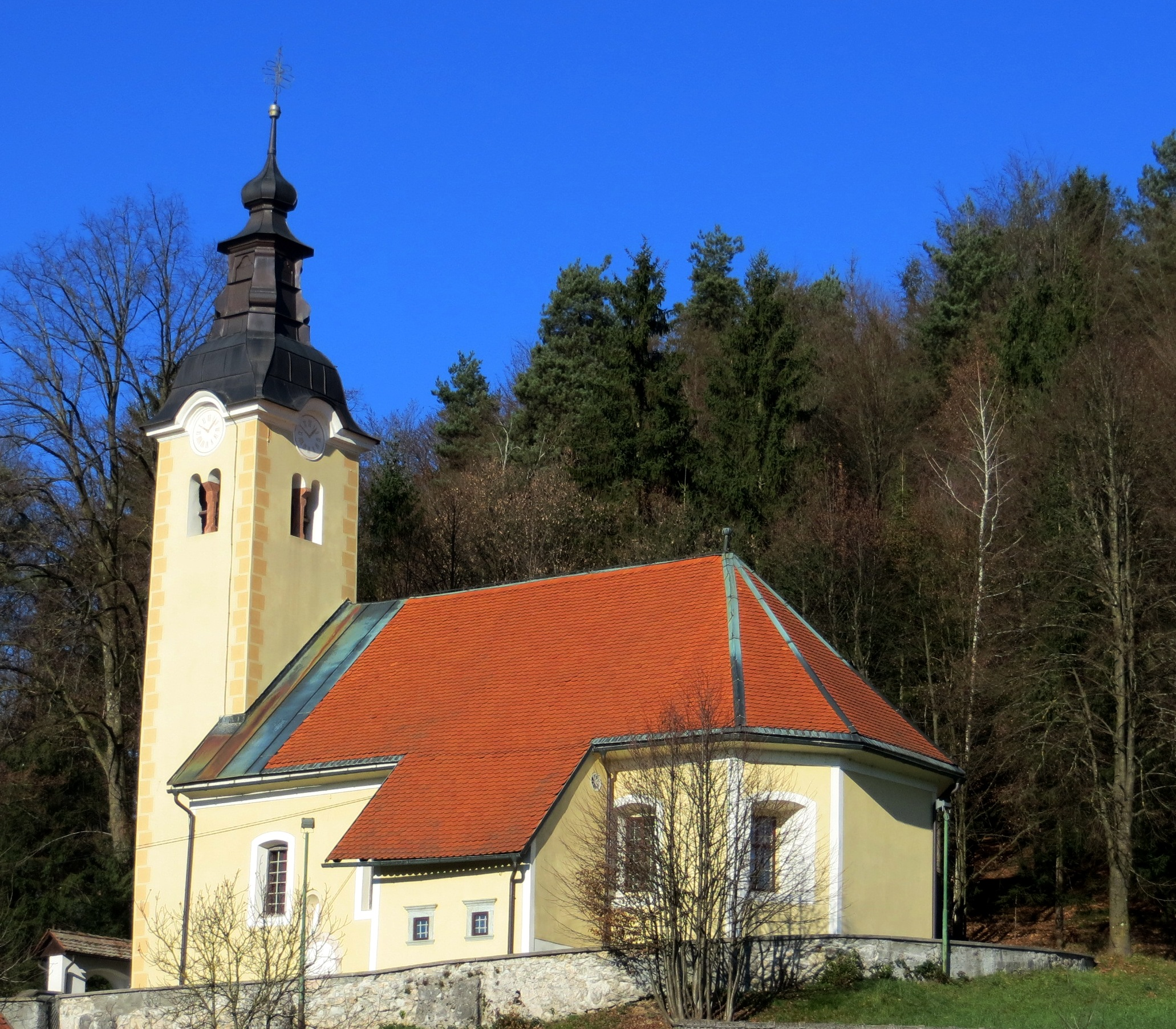
Saint Stephen's Church

The local church is dedicated to Saint Stephen and was first mentioned in documents dating to 1526.
