= Ulaka, Velike Lašče =

Ulaka
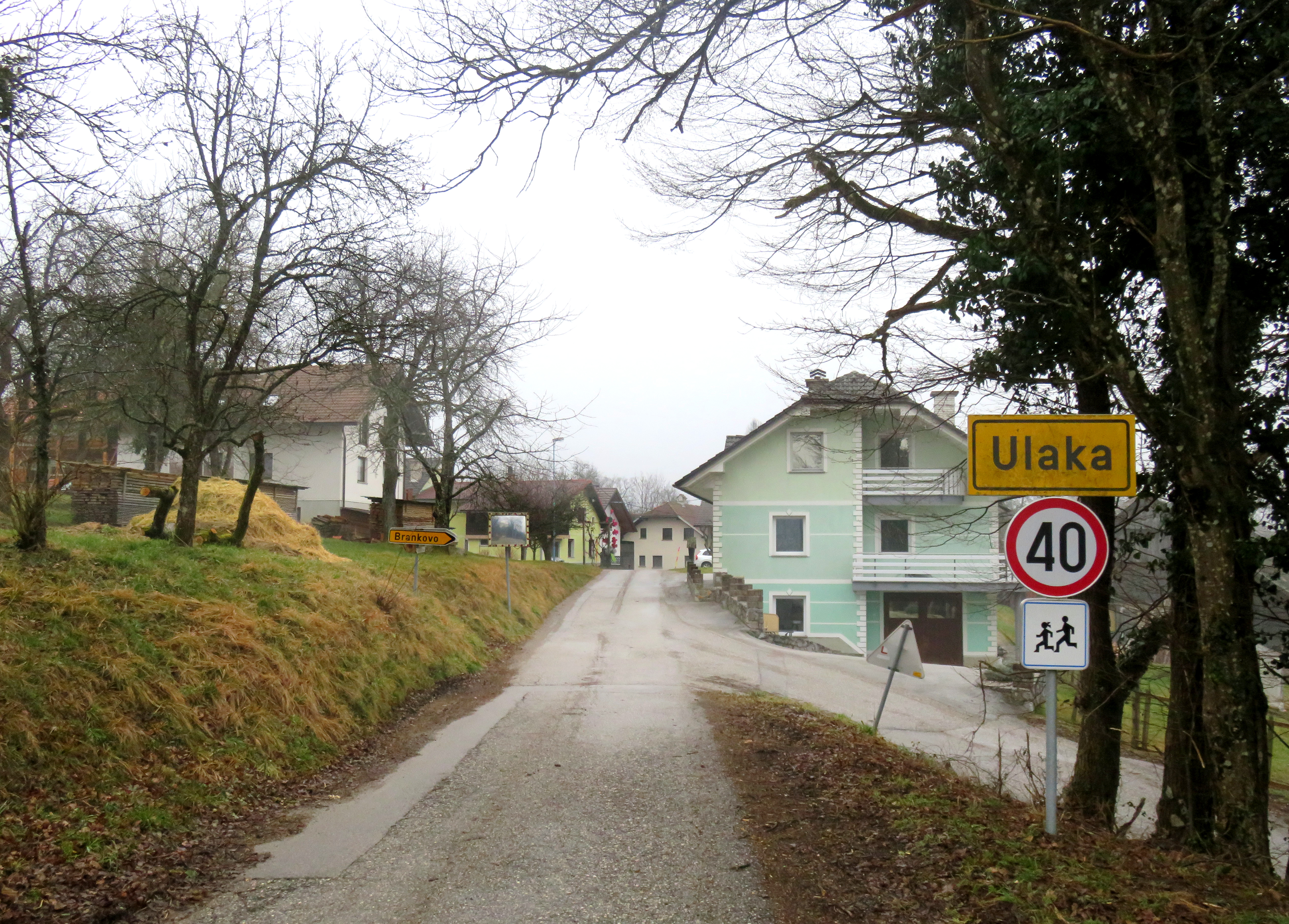

- Location in Slovenia
- Coordinates: 45°49′54.78″N 14°36′32.66″E
- Country: Slovenia
- Traditional region: Lower Carniola
- Statistical region: Central Slovenia
- Municipality: Velike Lašče

Area
  - Total: 0.41 km^{2} (0.16 sq mi)
- Elevation: 610.3 m (2,002 ft)

Population (2002)
  - Total: 40
- Postal code: 1315

Ulaka (pronounced [ˈuːlaka]) is a small village west of Velike Lašče in central Slovenia. The Municipality of Velike Lašče is part of the traditional region of Lower Carniola and is included in the Central Slovenia Statistical Region.

A small chapel-shrine in the centre of the settlement dates to 1882.
