= Šinkov Turn =

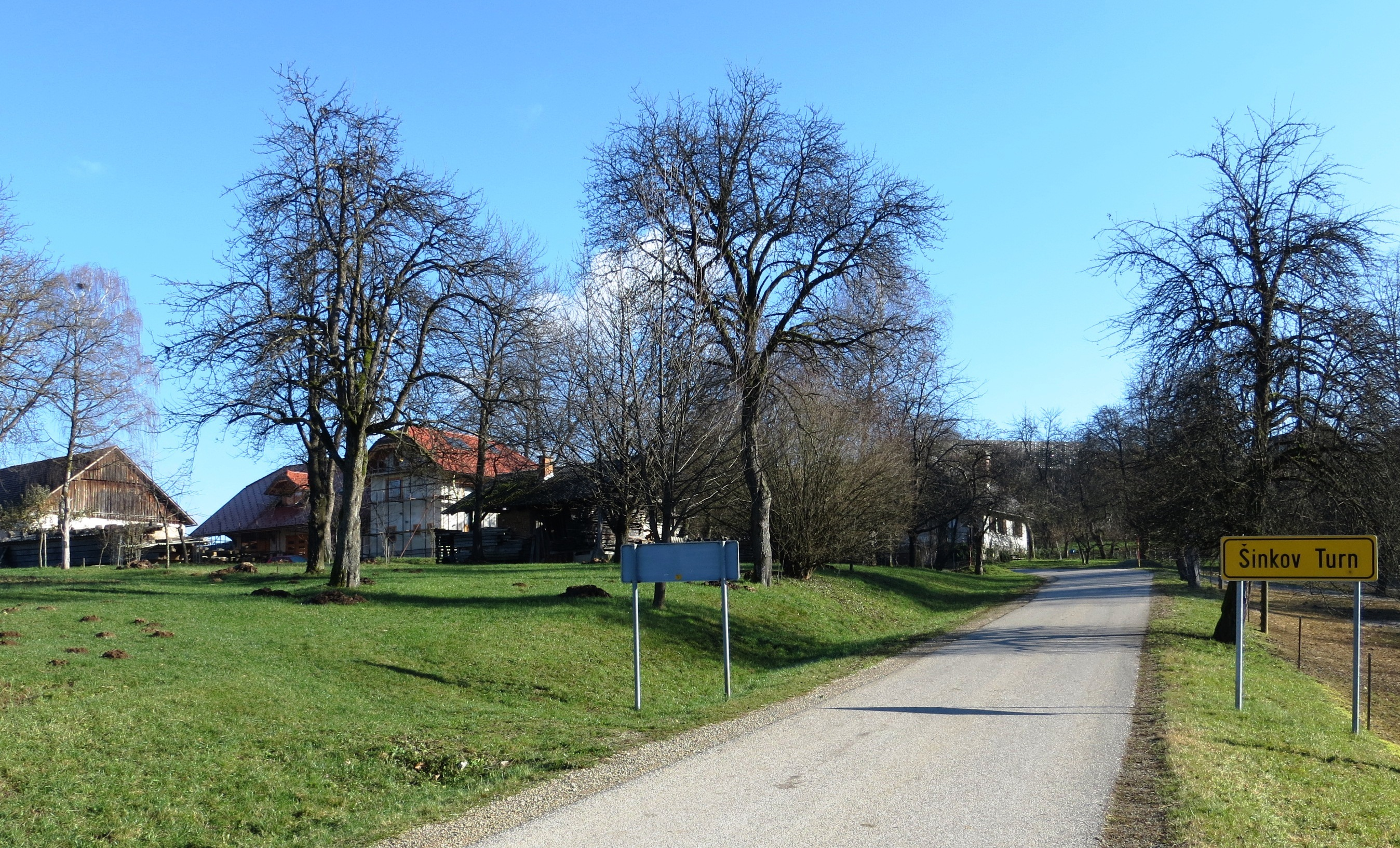

- Location in Slovenia
- Coordinates: 46°9′45.71″N 14°31′40.86″E
- Country: Slovenia
- Traditional region: Upper Carniola
- Statistical region: Central Slovenia
- Municipality: Vodice

Area
  - Total: 1.35 km^{2} (0.52 sq mi)
- Elevation: 347.9 m (1,141 ft)

Population (2002)
  - Total: 112

Šinkov Turn (pronounced [ˈʃiːŋkɔu̯ ˈtuːɾn]; in older sources Šenkov Turn, German: Schenkenthurn) is a village in the Municipality of Vodice in the Upper Carniola region of Slovenia. It lies at the northeast end of the Skaručna Basin (Slovene: Skaruško polje).

== Name ==
Šinkov Turn was attested in written sources in 1314 as von den Turen (and as bei den Turen in 1337, pei des Schenken turen in 1353, von Turren in 1355, and Schenkenturn in 1419). The village is named after a castle that was built in 1240, the ruins of which are still visible today. The name Turn is used for several castles in Slovenia. It is derived from the world turen 'tower', borrowed from Middle High German turn 'tower' (in turn from Latin turris 'tower, castle' from Greek τύρσις 'fortified settlement'). The epithet Šinkov is derived from an early owner, a Baron Šenk, and distinguished the castle from other castles named Turn.

== Church ==
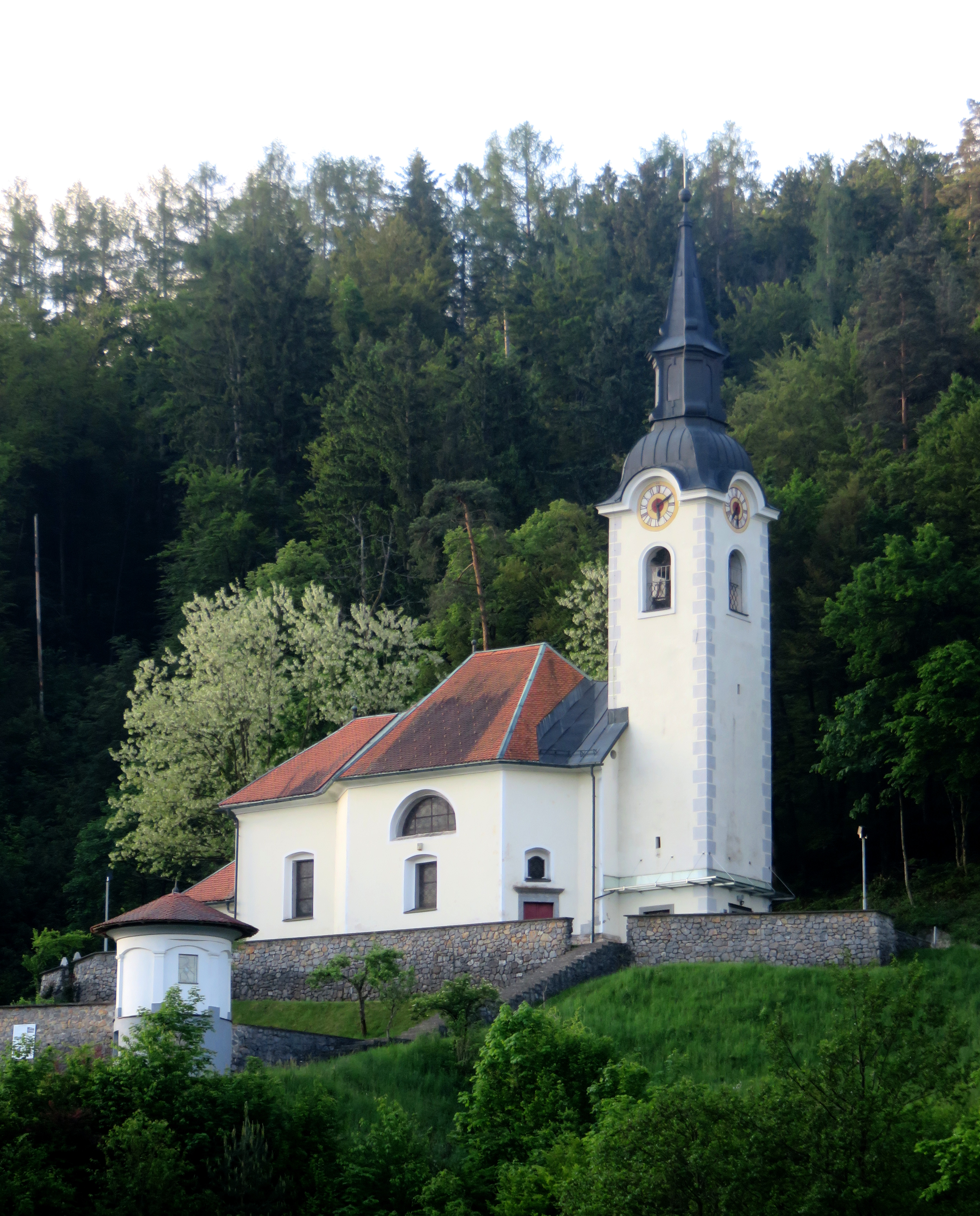
Virgin Mary Church

The church on the edge of the settlement is dedicated to the Virgin Mary. A church at the site was first mentioned in 1526 and the current structure dates from the 18th century.

== Castle ==
A castle, after which the village gets its name, used to stand in the village. It was originally built in 1250 and survived as a building with a triangular floor plan and an arcaded courtyard until 1943, when it was burned down by the Partisans. After the end of the Second World War, it was demolished and the stones from it were used as building material elsewhere.
