= Municipality of Vodice =

Municipality of Slovenia

Municipality of Vodice Občina Vodice
- Municipality
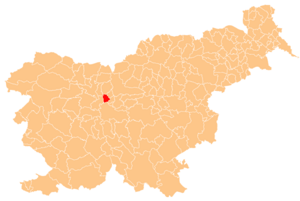
- Location of the Municipality of Vodice in Slovenia
- Coordinates: 46°10′N 14°30′E
- Country: Slovenia

Government
  - Mayor: Aco Franc Šuštar

Area
  - Total: 31.4 km^{2} (12.1 sq mi)

Population (2022)
  - Total: 5,039
  - Density: 160/km^{2} (416/sq mi)
- Time zone: UTC+01 (CET)
  - Summer (DST): UTC+02 (CEST)
- Website: www.vodice.si

The Municipality of Vodice (pronounced [ʋɔˈdiːtsɛ]; Slovene: Občina Vodice) is a municipality in the traditional region of Upper Carniola in north-central Slovenia. The seat of the municipality is the town of Vodice. Vodice became a municipality in 1994.

== Settlements ==
In addition to the municipal seat of Vodice, the municipality also includes the following settlements:

- Bukovica pri Vodicah
- Dobruša
- Dornice
- Koseze
- Polje pri Vodicah
- Povodje
- Repnje
- Selo pri Vodicah
- Šinkov Turn
- Skaručna
- Torovo
- Utik
- Vesca
- Vojsko
- Zapoge
