= Skaručna =

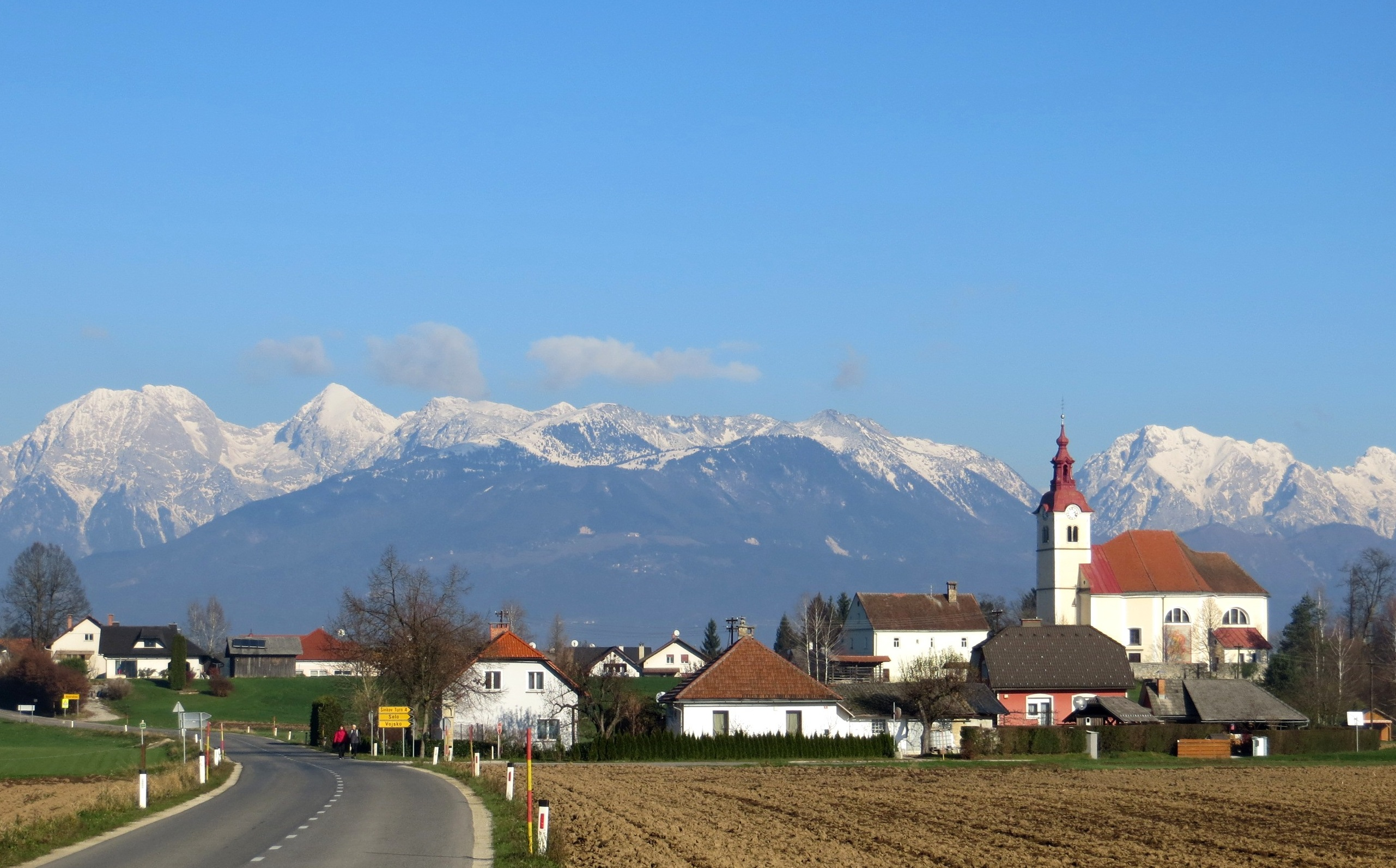

- Location in Slovenia
- Coordinates: 46°9′16.52″N 14°29′3.11″E
- Country: Slovenia
- Traditional region: Upper Carniola
- Statistical region: Central Slovenia
- Municipality: Vodice

Area
  - Total: 1.65 km^{2} (0.64 sq mi)
- Elevation: 326.36 m (1,070.7 ft)

Population (2002)
  - Total: 277

Skaručna (pronounced [skaˈɾuːtʃna]; German: Skarutschna) is a village in the Municipality of Vodice in the Upper Carniola region of Slovenia.

== Church ==
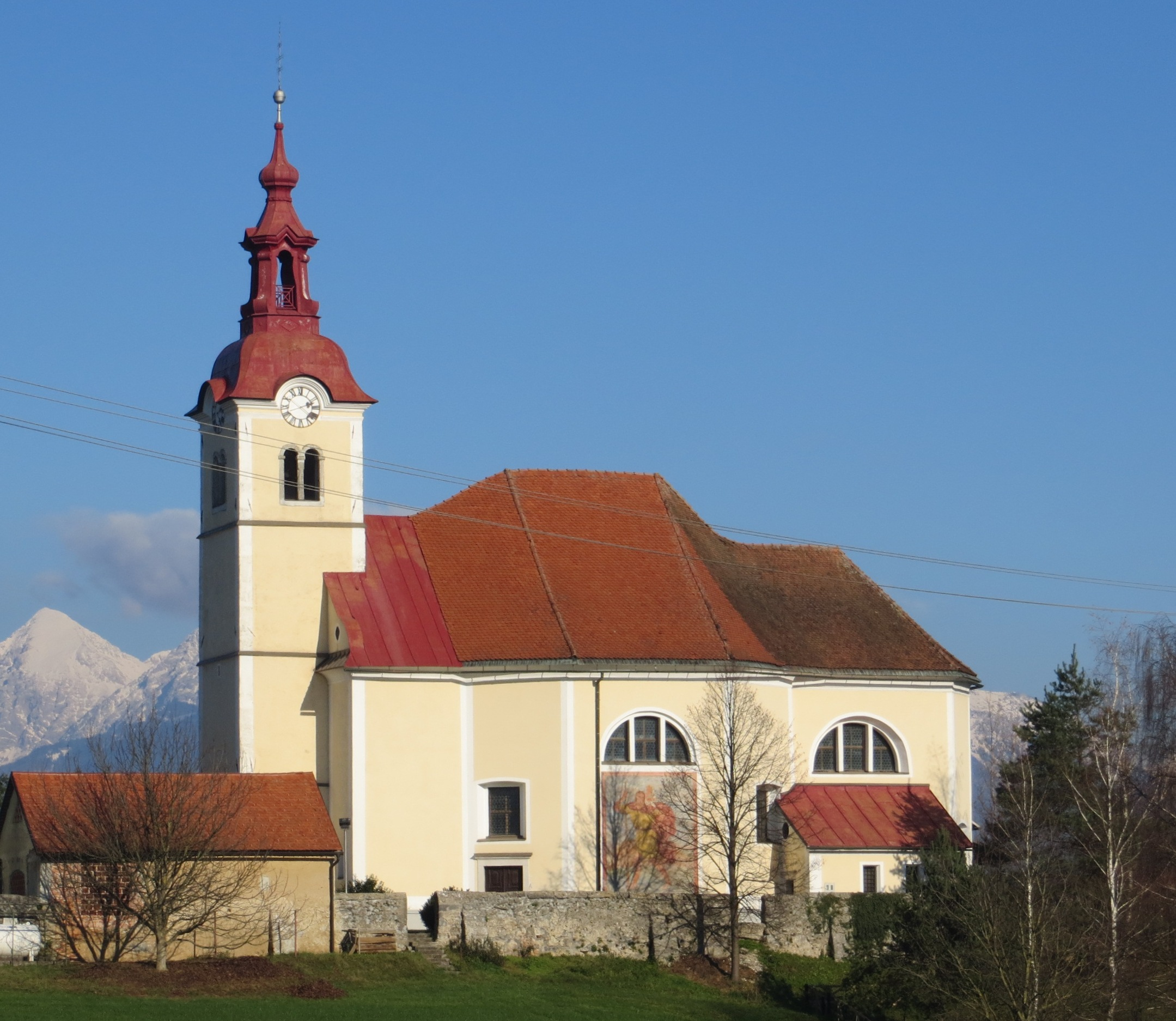
Saint Lucy's Church

The local church is dedicated to Saint Lucy and was built between 1662 and 1665. It was a popular pilgrimage church with people with a variety of eye diseases because Saint Lucy is considered the patron saint of the blind.
