= Vodice, Vodice =

Settlement in Slovenia

Vodice
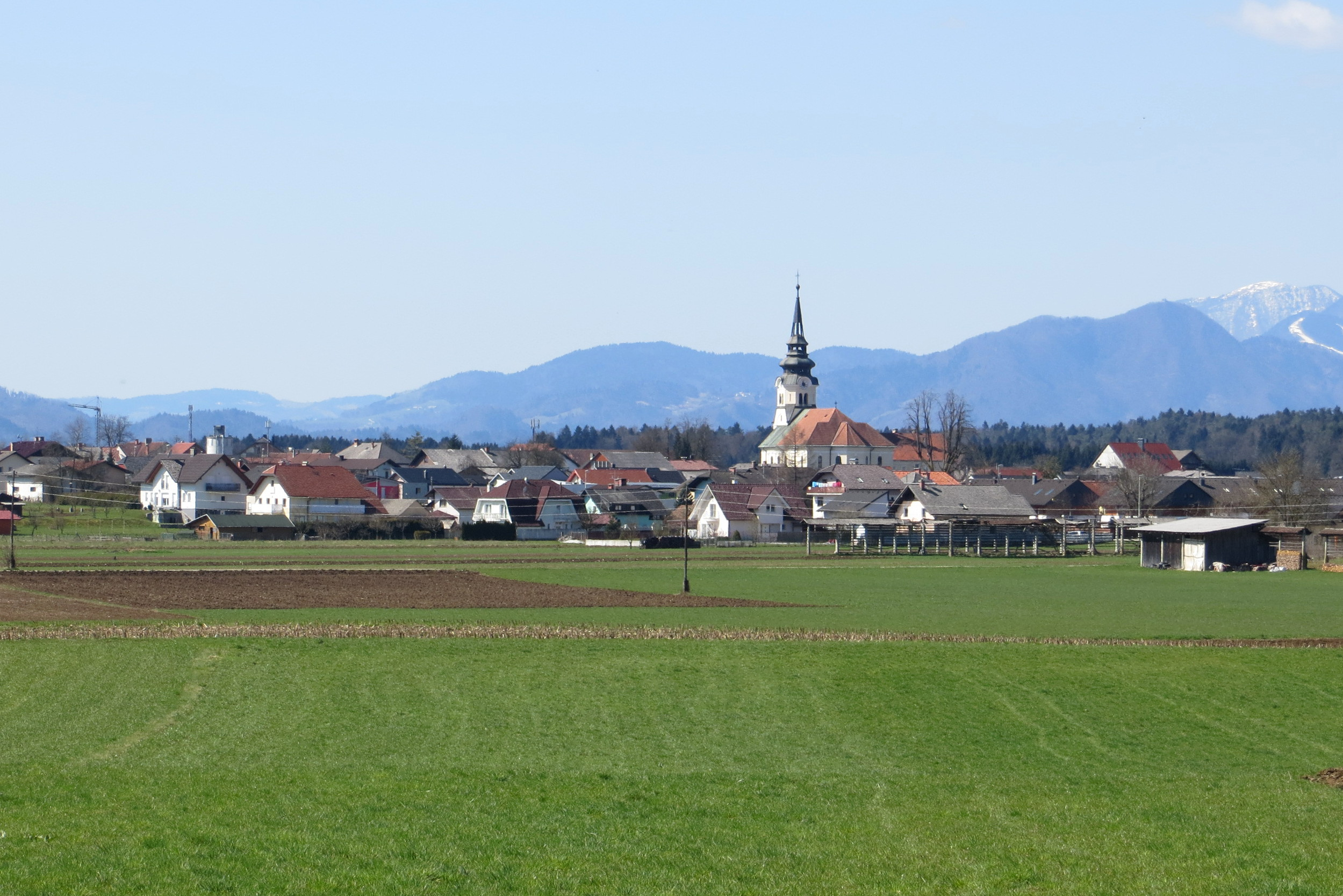

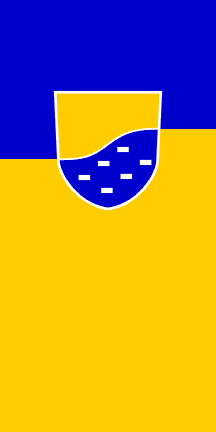
- Flag

- Location in Slovenia
- Coordinates: 46°11′23″N 14°29′40″E
- Country: Slovenia
- Traditional region: Upper Carniola
- Statistical region: Central Slovenia
- Municipality: Vodice

Area
  - Total: 6.0 km^{2} (2.3 sq mi)
- Elevation: 339.2 m (1,113 ft)

Population (2020)
  - Total: 1,706

Vodice (pronounced [ʋɔˈdiːtsɛ]; German: Woditz) is a settlement in the Municipality of Vodice in the Upper Carniola region of Slovenia, just north of Ljubljana. In addition to the main population center of Vodice, the settlement includes the hamlets of Gornji Konec, Na Vasi (Slovene: Na vasi), Lokarje, Jegriše (or Jegrše), Mesto, Zaprice (German: Sapretz), and Pusence.

== Name ==
Vodice was first attested c. 1118 with reference to its church as in plebe sancte Margarete virginis, and as Wodiz in 1257 (and as Woditç in 1265). The name is ultimately derived from the Slovene common noun vodica, a diminutive of voda 'water, creek'. The name may therefore be based on the singular locative form *Vodicě (literally, 'by the small creek'), or may have originally been plural, referring to springs in the area. In the past the German name was Woditz.

== Church ==
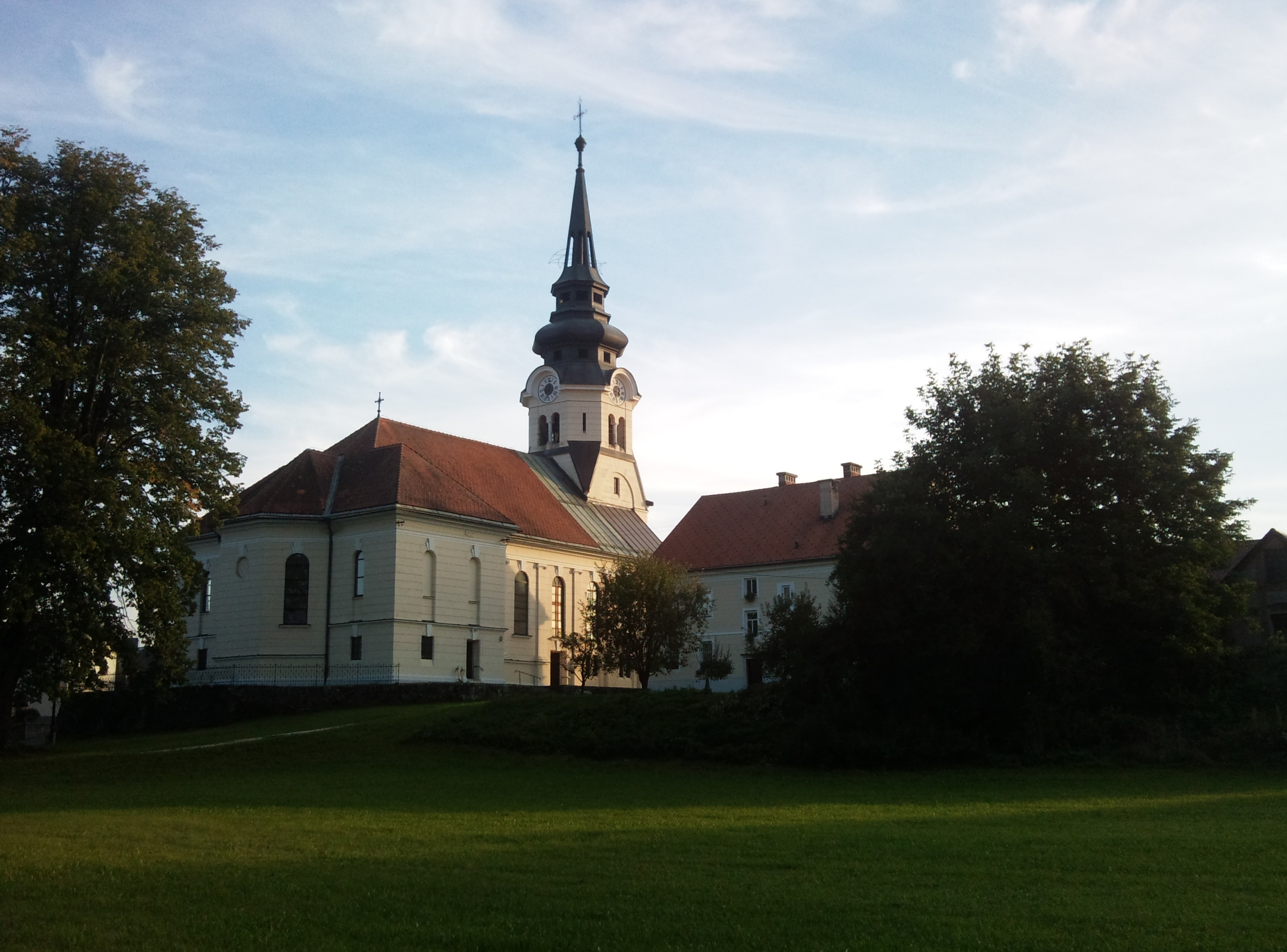
Saint Margaret's Church

The parish church in the settlement is dedicated to Saint Margaret and was first mentioned in documents dating to 1118. It used to have a defensive wall around it to protect the population from Ottoman raids, but this was demolished in 1871. The church was damaged in the 1895 Ljubljana earthquake and was rebuilt in entirety from 1896 until 1900 based on plans by the architect Raimund Jeblinger.
