= Hribljane =

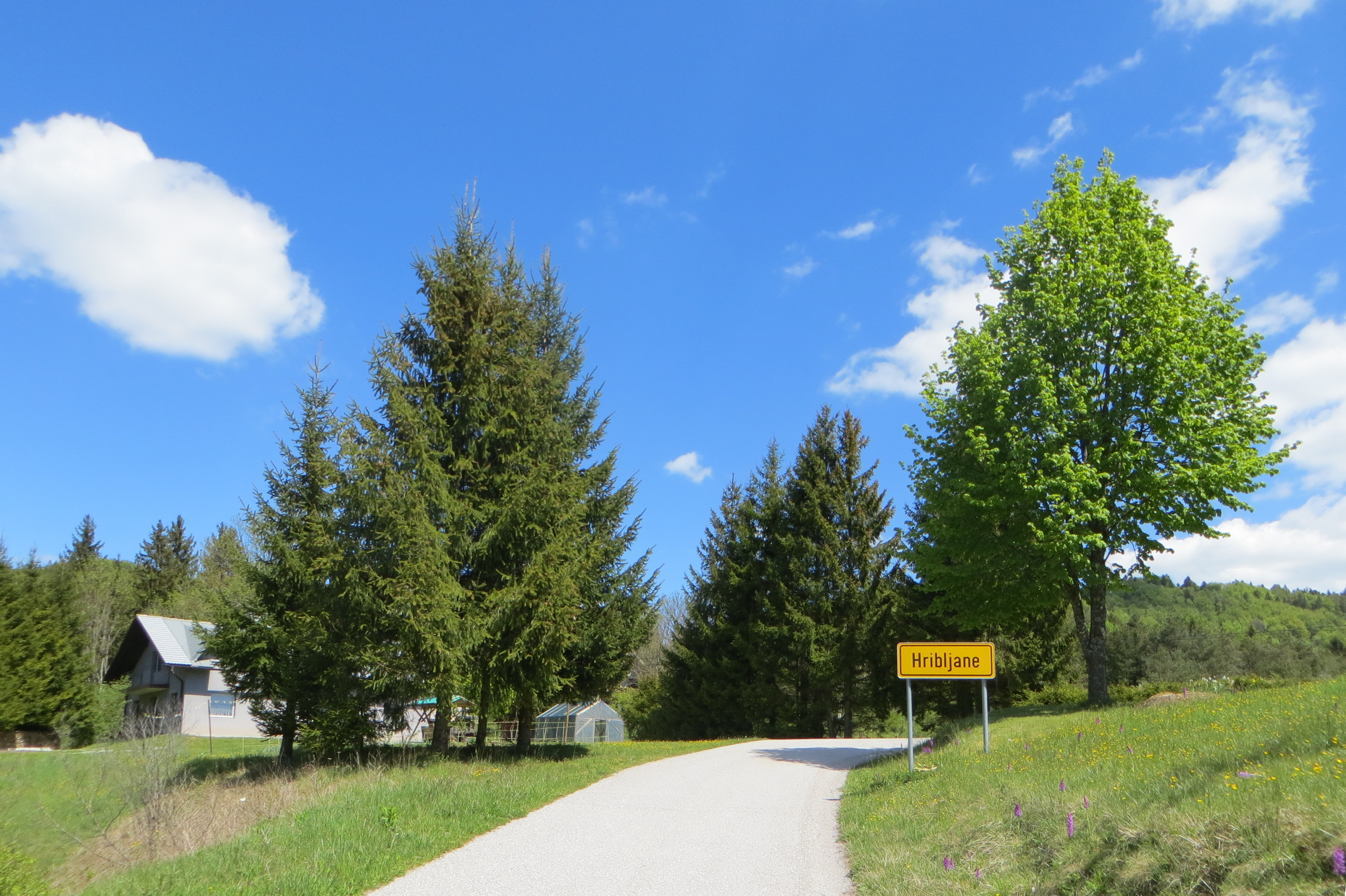

- Location in Slovenia
- Coordinates: 45°50′8.48″N 14°27′36.39″E
- Country: Slovenia
- Traditional region: Inner Carniola
- Statistical region: Littoral–Inner Carniola
- Municipality: Cerknica

Area
  - Total: 0.69 km^{2} (0.27 sq mi)
- Elevation: 671.2 m (2,202 ft)

Population (2020)
  - Total: 9
  - Density: 13/km^{2} (34/sq mi)

Hribljane (pronounced [xɾiˈbljaːnɛ], German: Herblane) is a small settlement in the hills northeast of Cerknica in the Inner Carniola region of Slovenia.

== Geography ==
Hribljane consists of a few scattered houses on the top and north slope of Hribljane Hill (Slovene: Hribljanov grič, elevation: 681 meters or 2,234 feet). There are several springs on the north slope of the hill, and the largest, Šumi Spring, supplied water to the village in the past. Močilo Spring, which lies to the east toward Pirmane, was only occasionally used for water. There are tilled fields and hay meadows on the south slope of the hill. The territory of the village extends north across the valley of Jazbine Creek.

== History ==
Before the Second World War, two mills operated along Jazbine Creek in Hribljane.
