= Cajnarje =

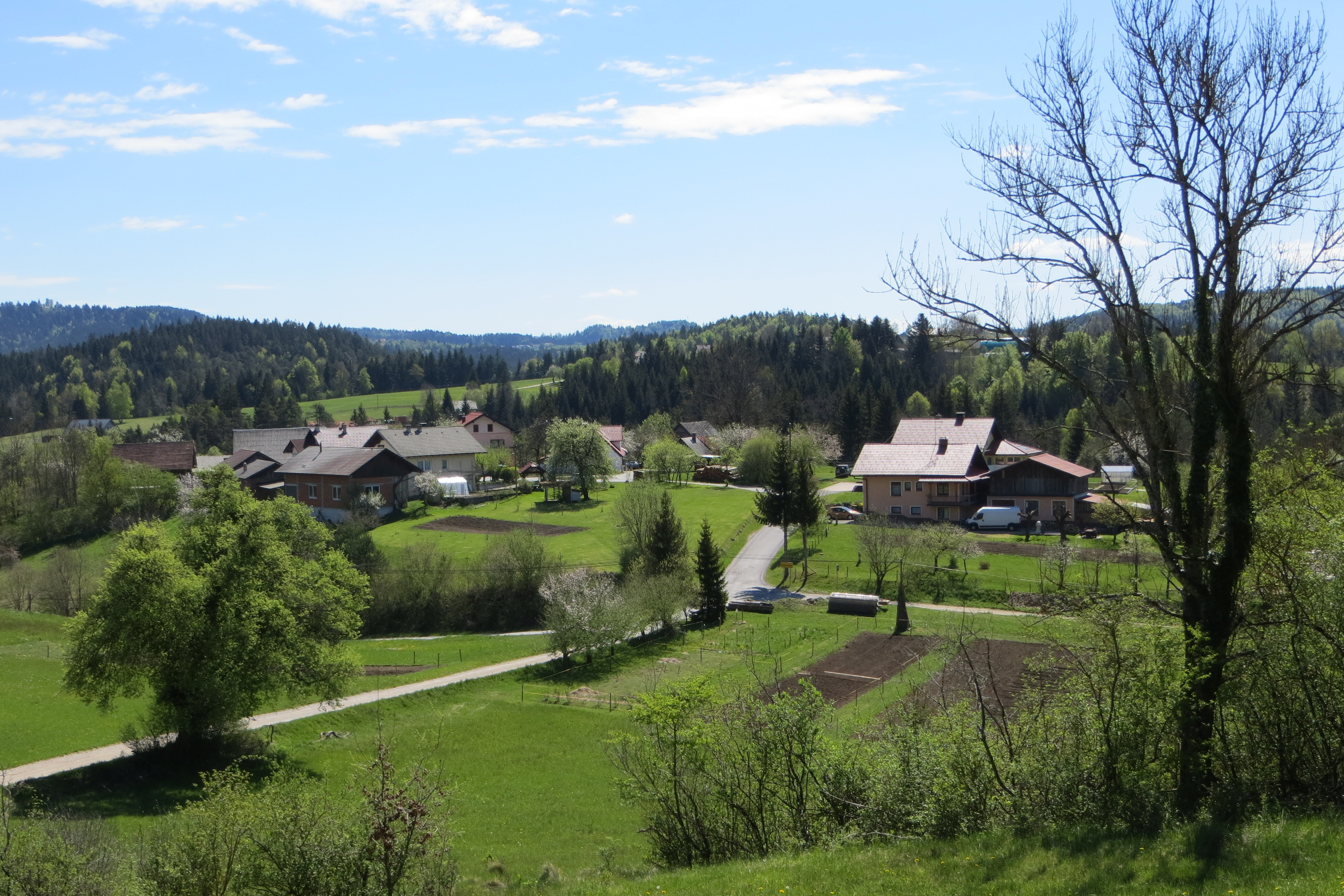

- Location in Slovenia
- Coordinates: 45°49′46.25″N 14°26′54.43″E
- Country: Slovenia
- Traditional region: Inner Carniola
- Statistical region: Littoral–Inner Carniola
- Municipality: Cerknica

Area
  - Total: 0.64 km^{2} (0.25 sq mi)
- Elevation: 629 m (2,064 ft)

Population (2020)
  - Total: 20
  - Density: 31/km^{2} (81/sq mi)

Cajnarje (pronounced [ˈtsaːi̯naɾjɛ]; German: Zainarje) is a village in the hills northeast of Cerknica in the Inner Carniola region of Slovenia.

== Church ==
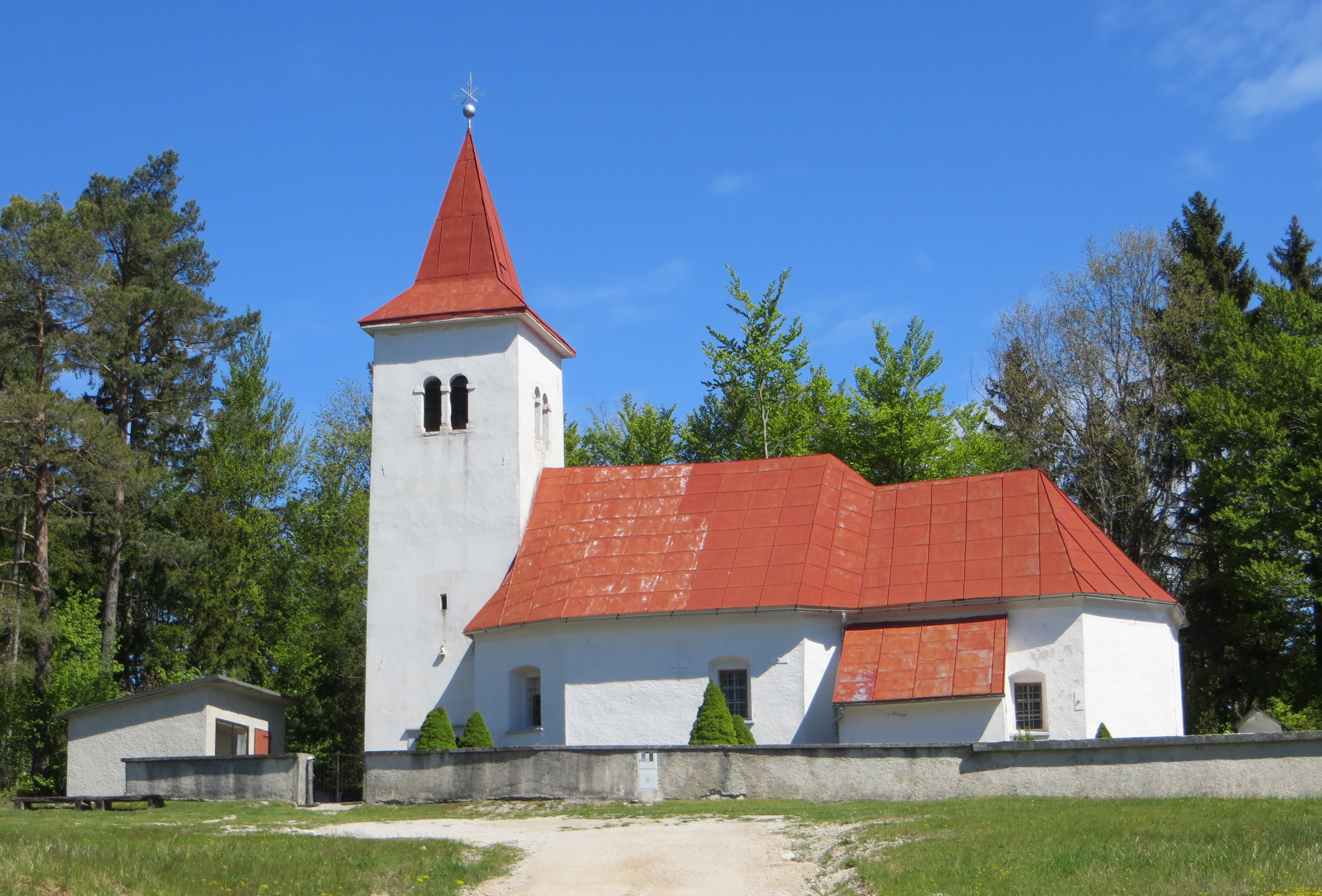
Saint George's Church

The local church, built on a small hill north of the settlement, is dedicated to Saint George and belongs to the Parish of Sveti Vid.
