= Topol pri Begunjah =

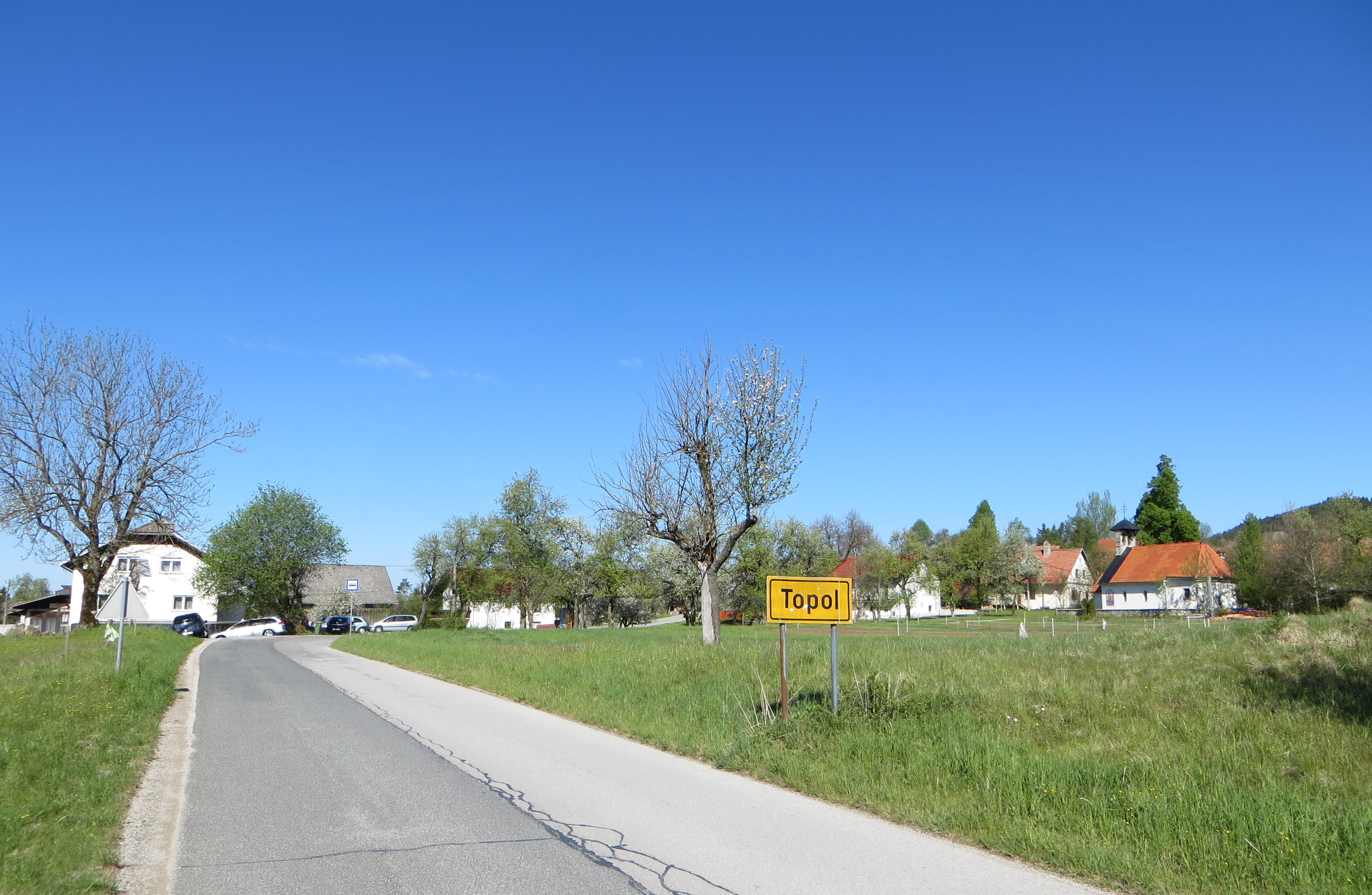

- Location in Slovenia
- Coordinates: 45°48′59.47″N 14°24′17.85″E
- Country: Slovenia
- Traditional region: Inner Carniola
- Statistical region: Littoral–Inner Carniola
- Municipality: Cerknica

Area
  - Total: 6.33 km^{2} (2.44 sq mi)
- Elevation: 632.1 m (2,074 ft)

Population (2020)
  - Total: 76
  - Density: 12/km^{2} (31/sq mi)

Topol pri Begunjah (pronounced [ˈtɔːpɔu̯ pɾi ˈbeːɡunjax]) is a village east of Begunje in the Municipality of Cerknica in the Inner Carniola region of Slovenia.

== Name ==
The name of the settlement was changed from Topol to Topol pri Begunjah in 1953.

== Church ==
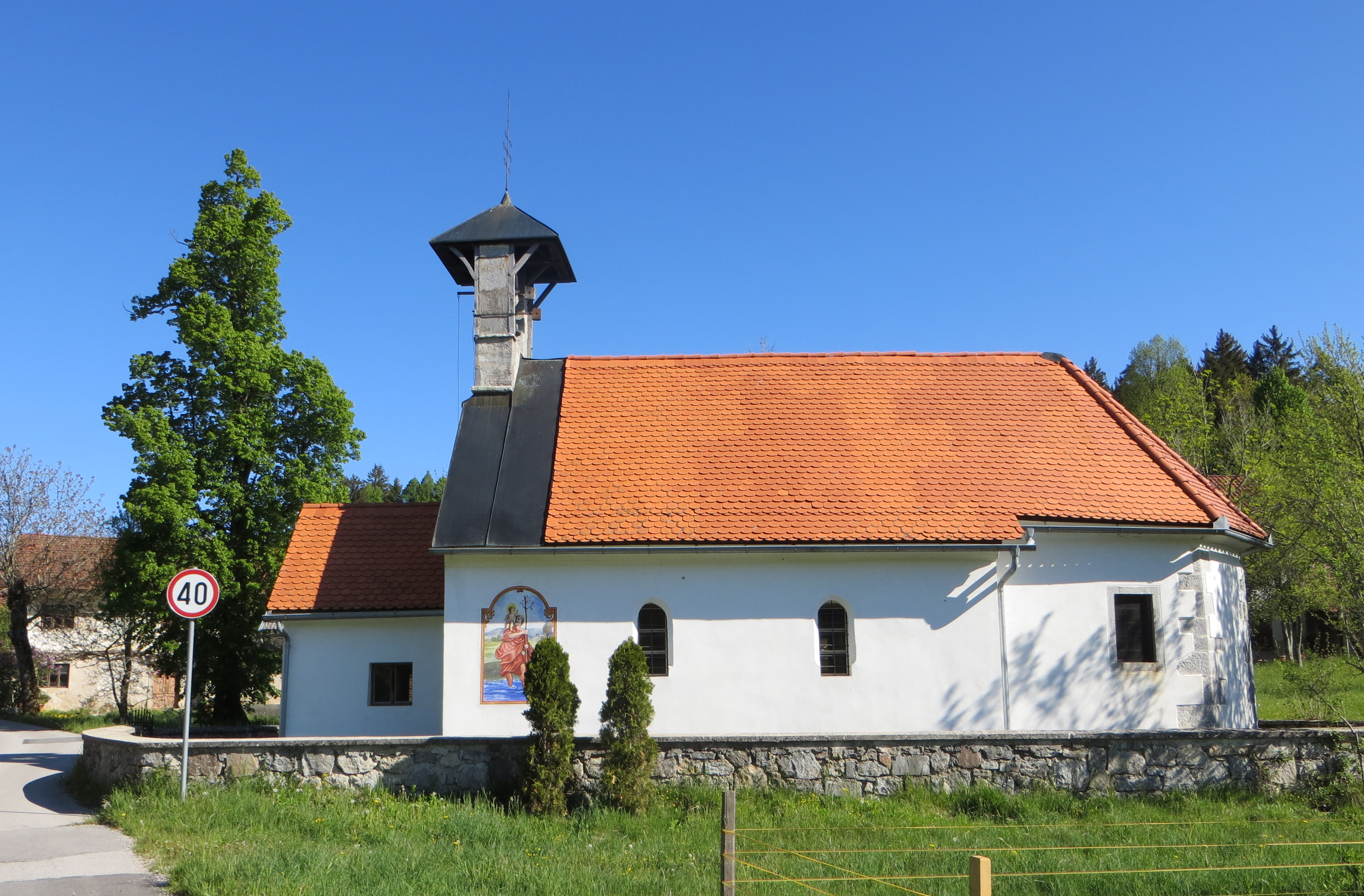
Saint Thomas's Church

The local church is dedicated to Saint Thomas and belongs to the Parish of Begunje pri Cerknici.
