= Ščurkovo =

- Location in Slovenia
- Coordinates: 45°49′49.71″N 14°28′51.07″E
- Country: Slovenia
- Traditional region: Inner Carniola
- Statistical region: Littoral–Inner Carniola
- Municipality: Cerknica

Area
  - Total: 0.4 km^{2} (0.15 sq mi)
- Elevation: 700 m (2,300 ft)

Population (2020)
  - Total: 0

Ščurkovo (pronounced [ˈʃtʃuːɾkɔʋɔ]) is a small village east of Begunje pri Cerknici in the Municipality of Cerknica in the Inner Carniola region of Slovenia. It consists of a single farm on a side road. It has had no permanent residents since 1965, when the last inhabitants moved away.
