= Rudolfovo, Cerknica =

Rudolfovo
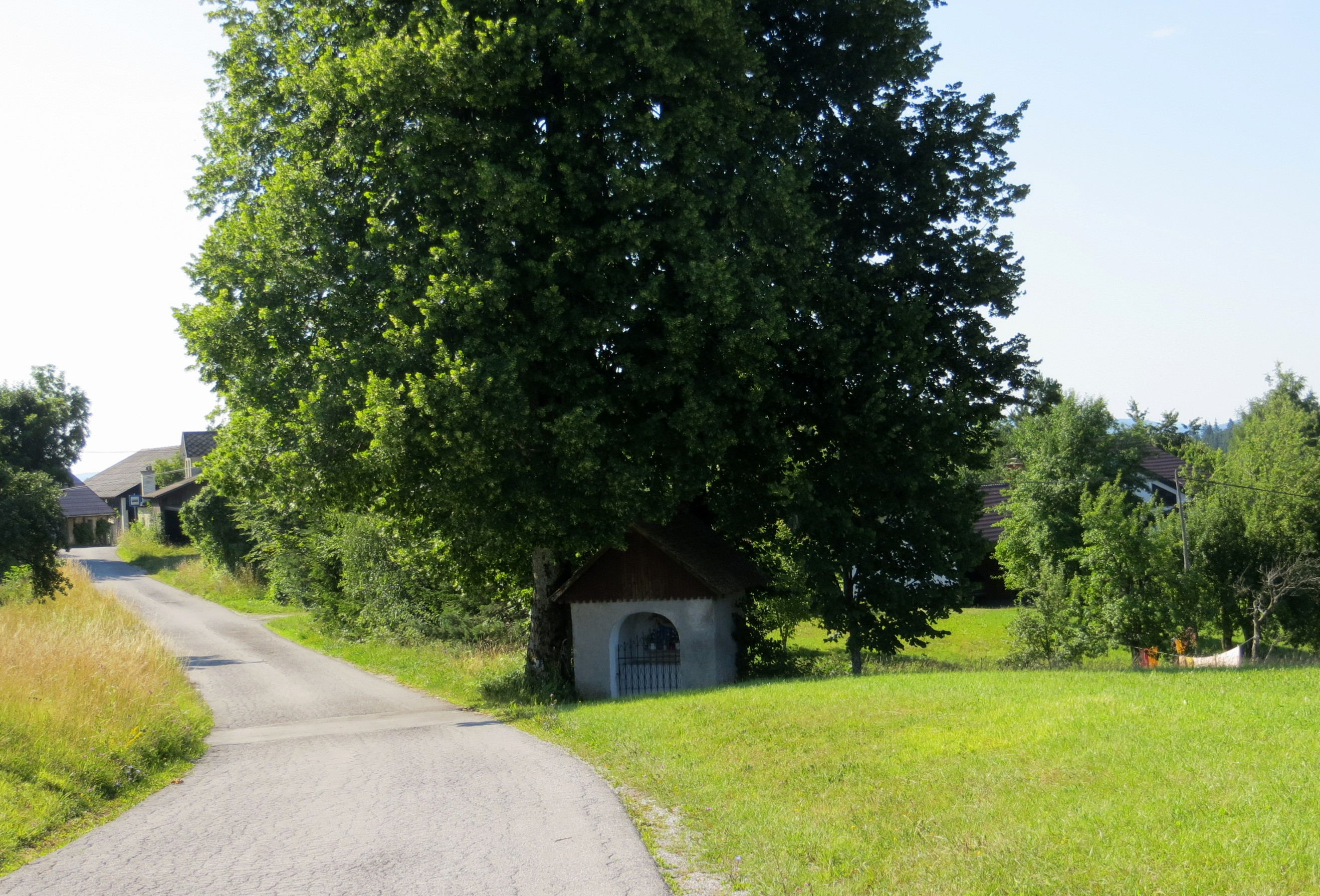

- Location in Slovenia
- Coordinates: 45°51′3.32″N 14°27′56.72″E
- Country: Slovenia
- Traditional region: Inner Carniola
- Statistical region: Littoral–Inner Carniola
- Municipality: Cerknica

Area
  - Total: 0.74 km^{2} (0.29 sq mi)
- Elevation: 833.3 m (2,734 ft)

Population (2020)
  - Total: 3
  - Density: 4.1/km^{2} (10/sq mi)

Rudolfovo (pronounced [ˈɾuːdɔlfɔʋɔ]) is a small settlement in hills northeast of Begunje in the Municipality of Cerknica in the Inner Carniola region of Slovenia.
