= Hruškarje =

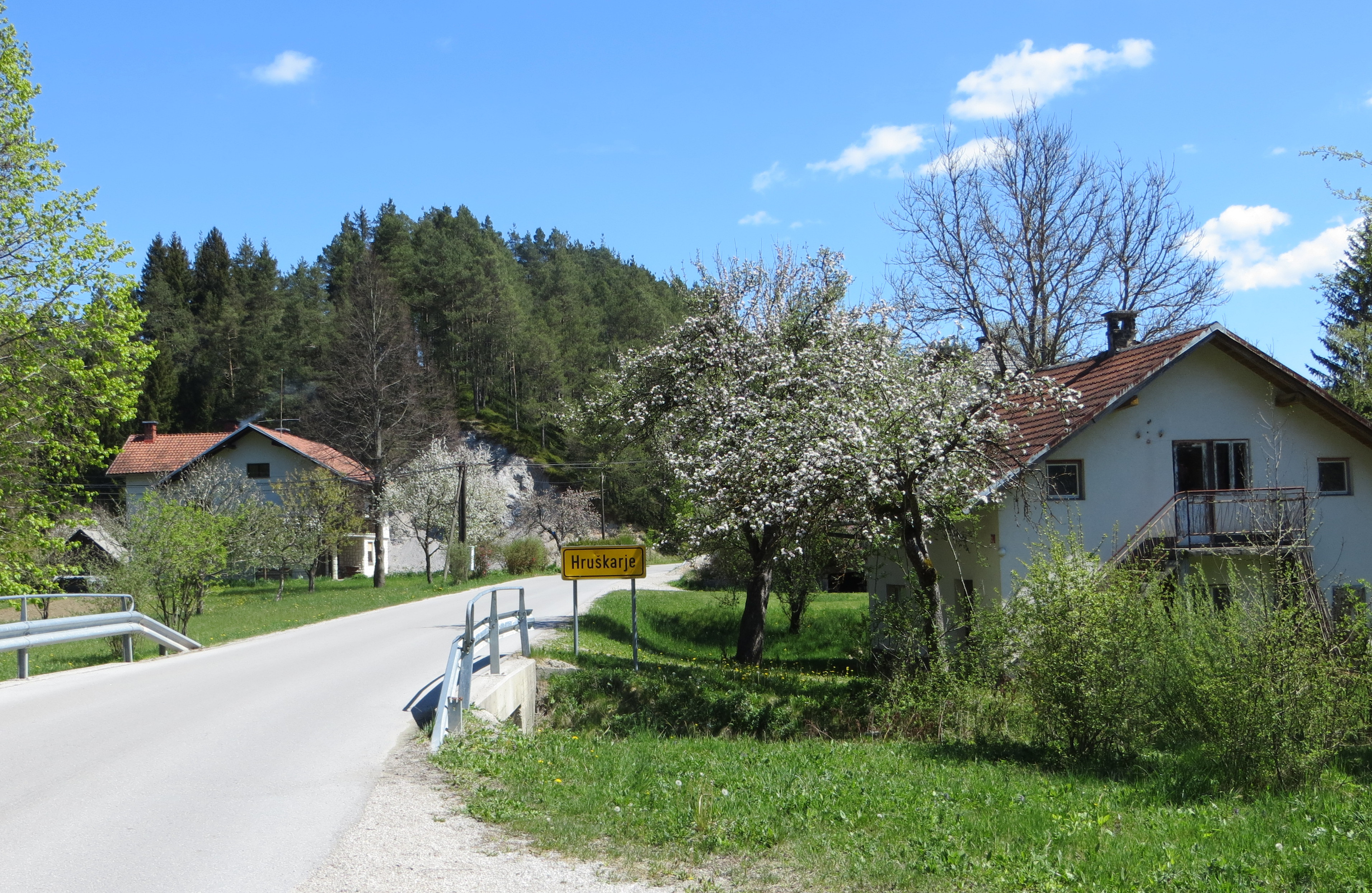

- Location in Slovenia
- Coordinates: 45°50′6.01″N 14°26′54.24″E
- Country: Slovenia
- Traditional region: Inner Carniola
- Statistical region: Littoral–Inner Carniola
- Municipality: Cerknica

Area
  - Total: 0.73 km^{2} (0.28 sq mi)
- Elevation: 652.1 m (2,139 ft)

Population (2020)
  - Total: 40
  - Density: 55/km^{2} (140/sq mi)

Hruškarje (pronounced [ˈxɾuːʃkaɾjɛ]) is a settlement in the hills northeast of Cerknica in the Inner Carniola region of Slovenia.
