= Kranjče =

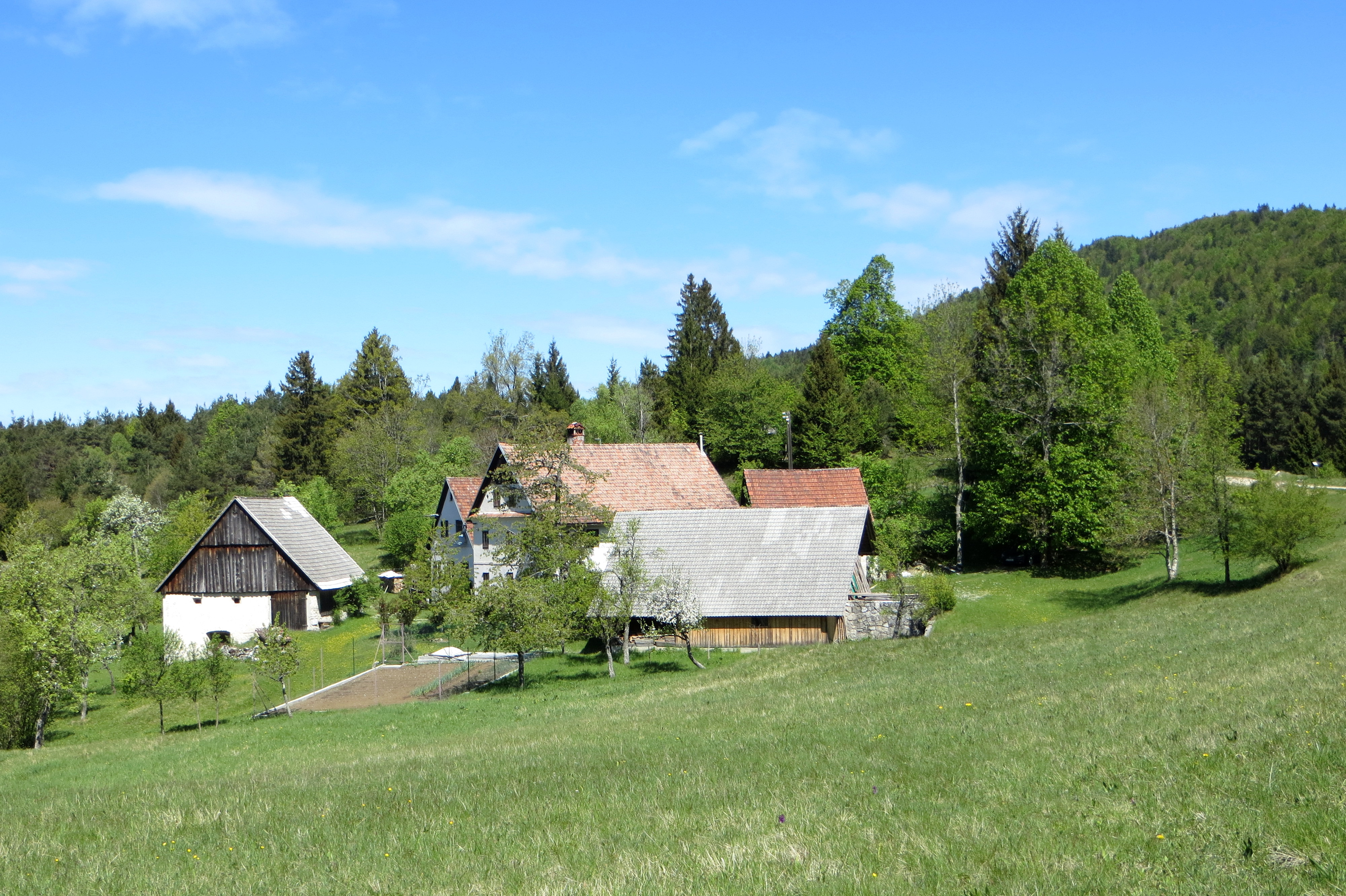

- Location in Slovenia
- Coordinates: 45°50′17.08″N 14°25′58.52″E
- Country: Slovenia
- Traditional region: Inner Carniola
- Statistical region: Littoral–Inner Carniola
- Municipality: Cerknica

Area
  - Total: 0.96 km^{2} (0.37 sq mi)
- Elevation: 750.3 m (2,462 ft)

Population (2020)
  - Total: 1
  - Density: 1.0/km^{2} (2.7/sq mi)

Kranjče (pronounced [ˈkɾaːntʃɛ]; German: Kraintsche) is a small settlement in the hills northeast of Begunje in the Municipality of Cerknica in the Inner Carniola region of Slovenia.

== Geography ==
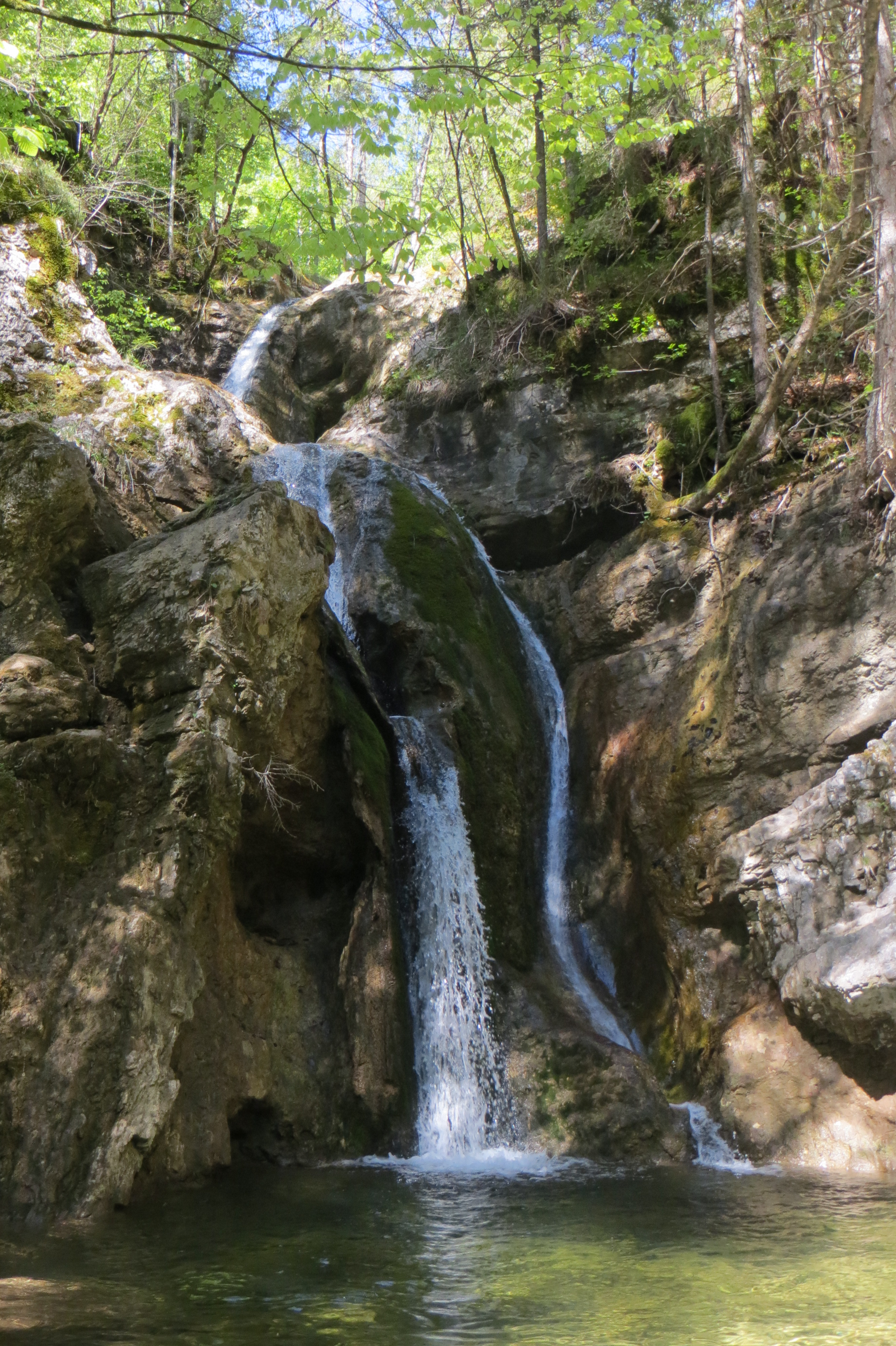
Gora Falls

Kranjče is bounded to the southwest by Mrzlek Creek, which separates the village's territory from neighboring Dolenje Otave. Gora Falls (Slovene: Slap Gora), named after the neighboring village of Gora, is located along the creek.
