= Kožljek =

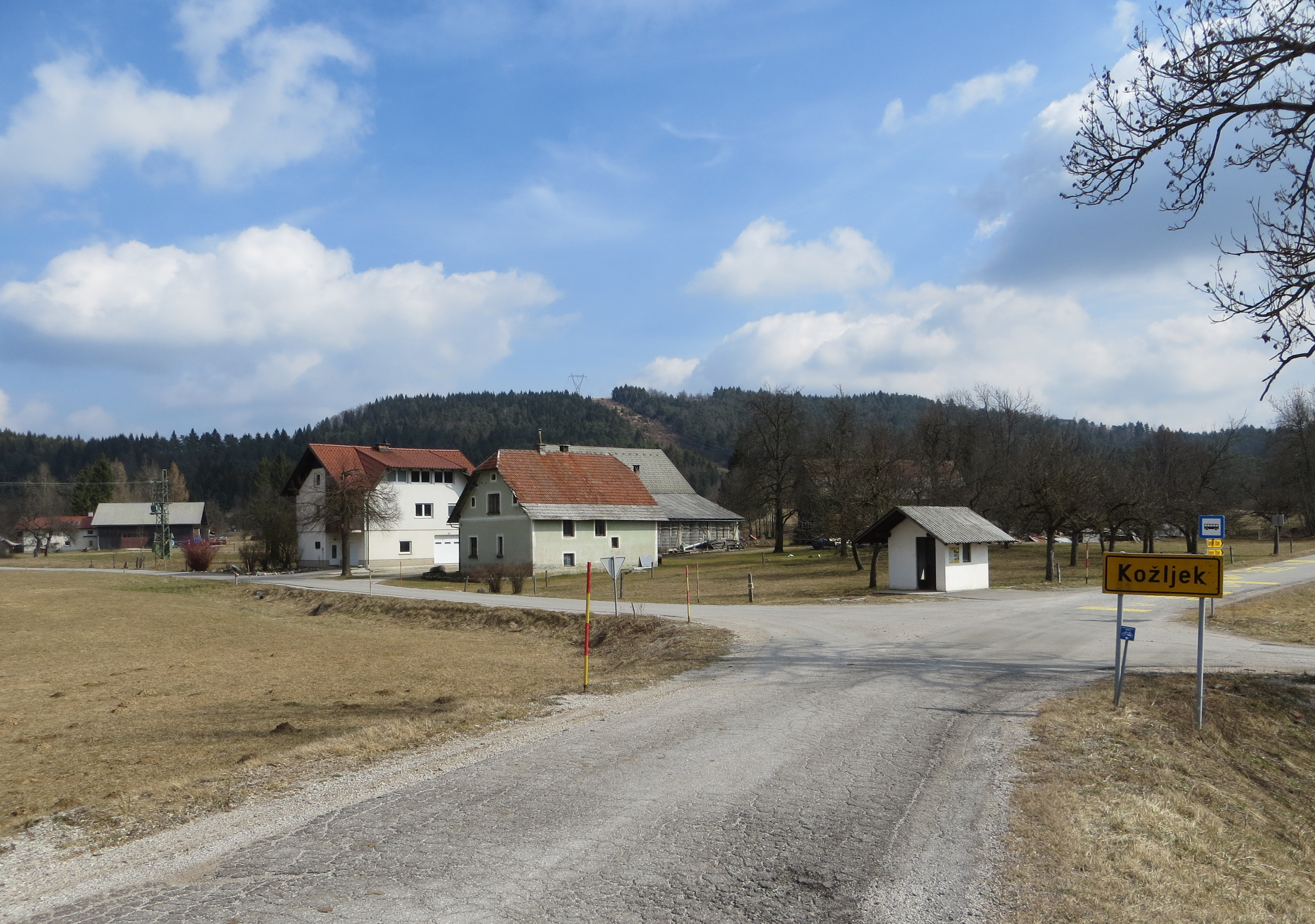

- Location in Slovenia
- Coordinates: 45°50′43.3″N 14°22′48.68″E
- Country: Slovenia
- Traditional region: Inner Carniola
- Statistical region: Littoral–Inner Carniola
- Municipality: Cerknica

Area
  - Total: 6.15 km^{2} (2.37 sq mi)
- Elevation: 788.2 m (2,586 ft)

Population (2020)
  - Total: 67
  - Density: 11/km^{2} (28/sq mi)
- Postal code: 1382

Kožljek (pronounced [ˈkoːʒljɛk], German: Koschlek) is a village in the hills north of Begunje in the Municipality of Cerknica in the Inner Carniola region of Slovenia.

== Church ==
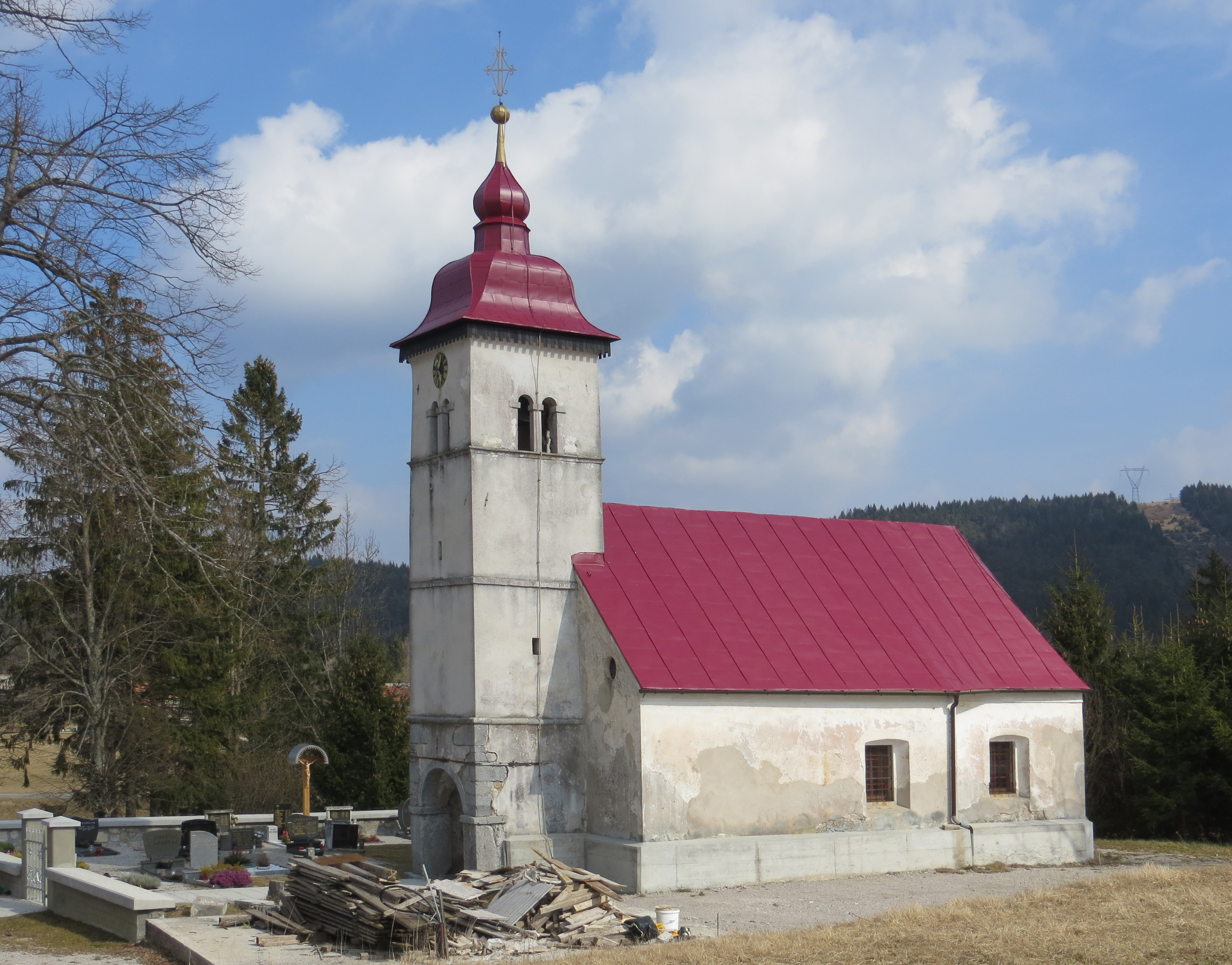
Saint Anne's Church

The local church in the settlement is dedicated to Saint Anne and belongs to the Parish of Begunje pri Cerknici.
