= Zahrib =

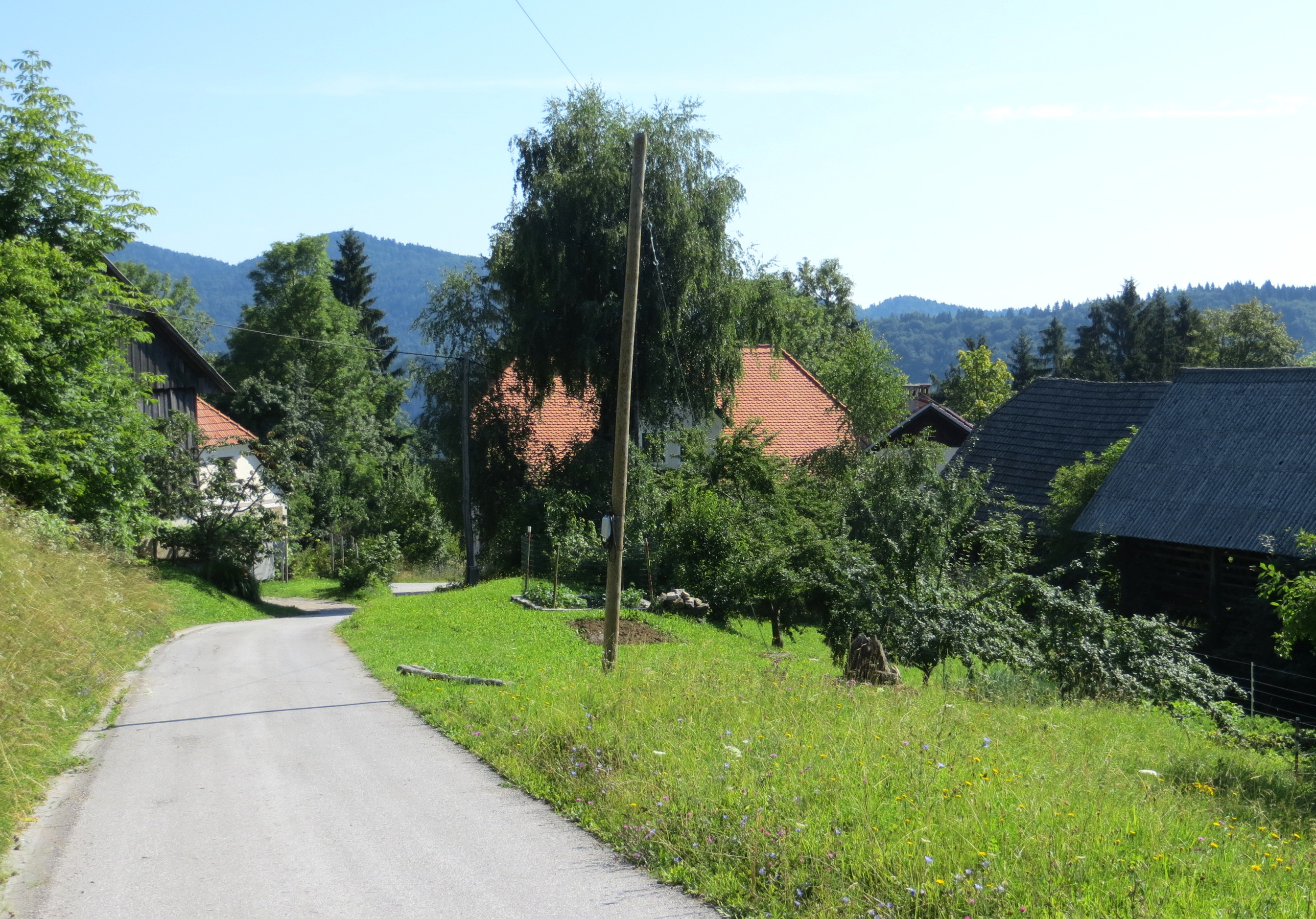

- Location in Slovenia
- Coordinates: 45°50′44.91″N 14°29′19.86″E
- Country: Slovenia
- Traditional region: Inner Carniola
- Statistical region: Littoral–Inner Carniola
- Municipality: Cerknica

Area
  - Total: 1.52 km^{2} (0.59 sq mi)
- Elevation: 810.6 m (2,659 ft)

Population (2020)
  - Total: 7
  - Density: 4.6/km^{2} (12/sq mi)

Zahrib (pronounced [zaˈxɾiːp]) is a small settlement in the hills northeast of the town of Cerknica in the Inner Carniola region of Slovenia.
