= Mahneti =

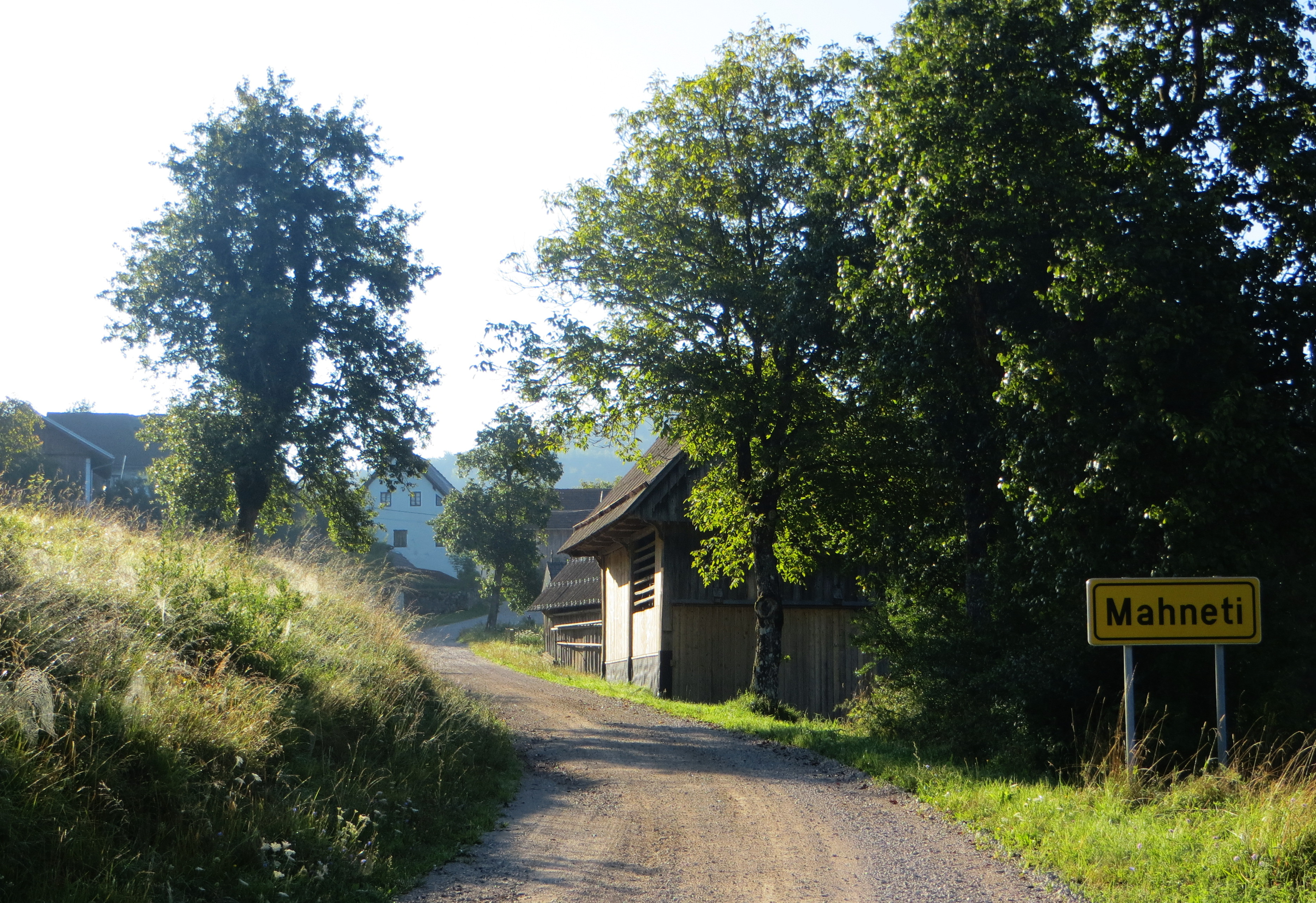

- Location in Slovenia
- Coordinates: 45°48′33.83″N 14°26′16.7″E
- Country: Slovenia
- Traditional region: Inner Carniola
- Statistical region: Littoral–Inner Carniola
- Municipality: Cerknica

Area
  - Total: 2.19 km^{2} (0.85 sq mi)
- Elevation: 665.9 m (2,185 ft)

Population (2020)
  - Total: 14
  - Density: 6.4/km^{2} (17/sq mi)

Mahneti (pronounced [maˈxneːti]) is a small settlement east of Cerknica in the Inner Carniola region of Slovenia.
