= Municipality of Cerknica =

Municipality of Slovenia

Municipality of Cerknica Občina Cerknica
- Municipality
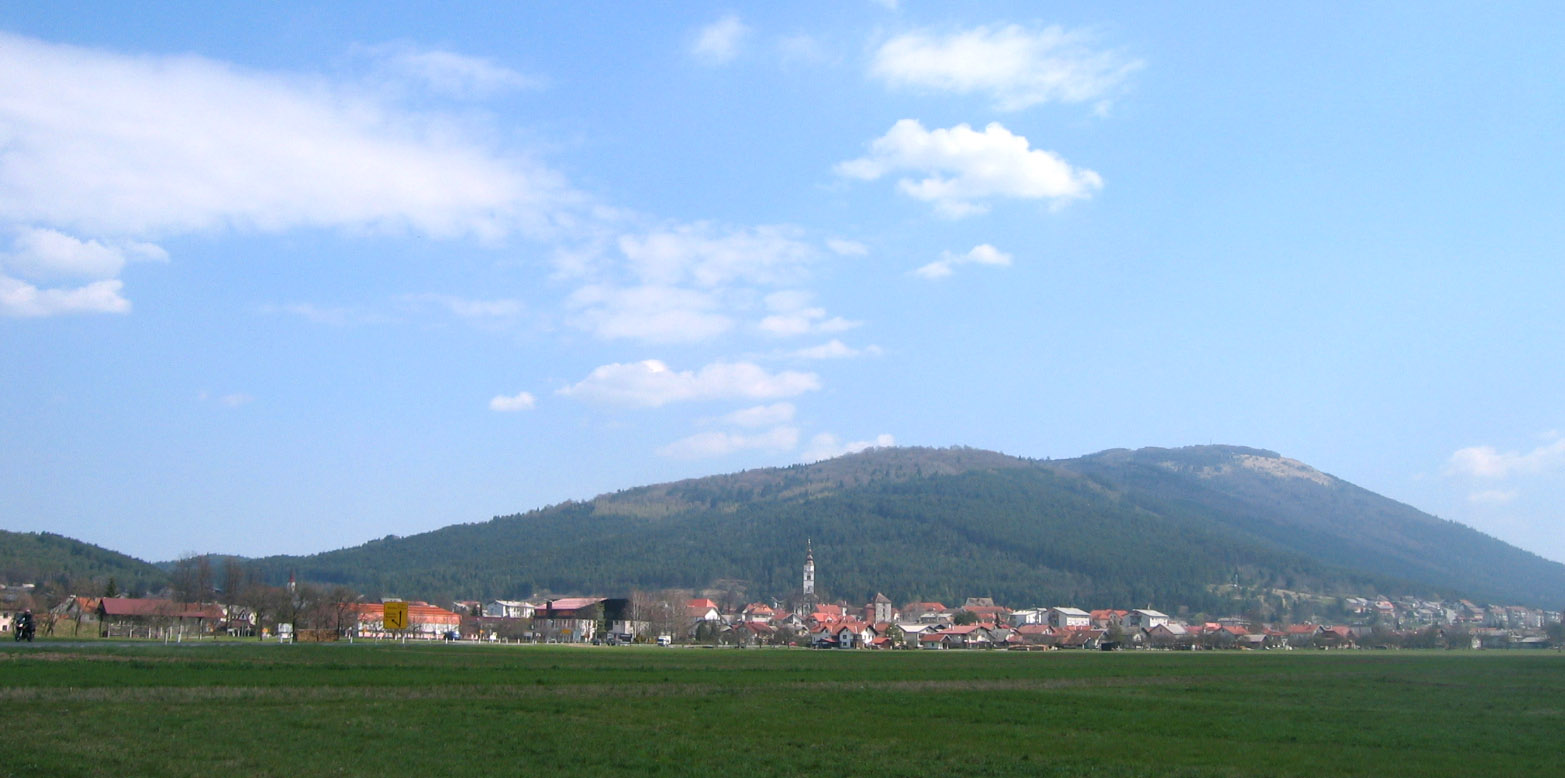

- Location of the Municipality of Cerknica in Slovenia
- Coordinates: 45°48′N 14°22′E
- Country: Slovenia

Government
  - Mayor: Marko Rupar (SDS)

Area
  - Total: 241 km^{2} (93 sq mi)

Population (2024)
  - Total: 11,879
  - Density: 49.3/km^{2} (128/sq mi)
- Time zone: UTC+01 (CET)
  - Summer (DST): UTC+02 (CEST)
- Website: www.cerknica.si
- Source: Statistical Office of the Republic of Slovenia, census of 2002.

The Municipality of Cerknica (pronounced [ˈtseːɾknitsa]; Slovene: Občina Cerknica) is a municipality in the Karst region of southwestern Slovenia, with a population of 11,879 in 2024. The seat of the municipality is the town of Cerknica. It belongs to the traditional region of Inner Carniola.

The best-known landmark of the municipality is Lake Cerknica, an intermittent lake and the largest lake in Slovenia, south of the town of Cerknica. Various watersports including windsurfing are popular on the lake.

== Settlements ==
In addition to the municipal seat of Cerknica, the municipality also includes the following settlements:

- Beč
- Bečaje
- Begunje pri Cerknici
- Bezuljak
- Bločice
- Bloška Polica
- Brezje
- Cajnarje
- Čohovo
- Dobec
- Dolenja Vas
- Dolenje Jezero
- Dolenje Otave
- Gora
- Gorenje Jezero
- Gorenje Otave
- Goričice
- Grahovo
- Hribljane
- Hruškarje
- Ivanje Selo
- Jeršiče
- Korošče
- Koščake
- Kožljek
- Kranjče
- Kremenca
- Krušče
- Kržišče
- Laze pri Gorenjem Jezeru
- Lešnjake
- Lipsenj
- Mahneti
- Martinjak
- Milava
- Osredek
- Otok
- Otonica
- Pikovnik
- Pirmane
- Podskrajnik
- Podslivnica
- Ponikve
- Rakek
- Rakov Škocjan
- Ravne
- Reparje
- Rudolfovo
- Selšček
- Slivice
- Slugovo
- Stražišče
- Ščurkovo
- Štrukljeva Vas
- Sveti Vid
- Tavžlje
- Topol pri Begunjah
- Unec
- Zahrib
- Zala
- Zelše
- Žerovnica
- Zibovnik
- Župeno
