= Župeno =

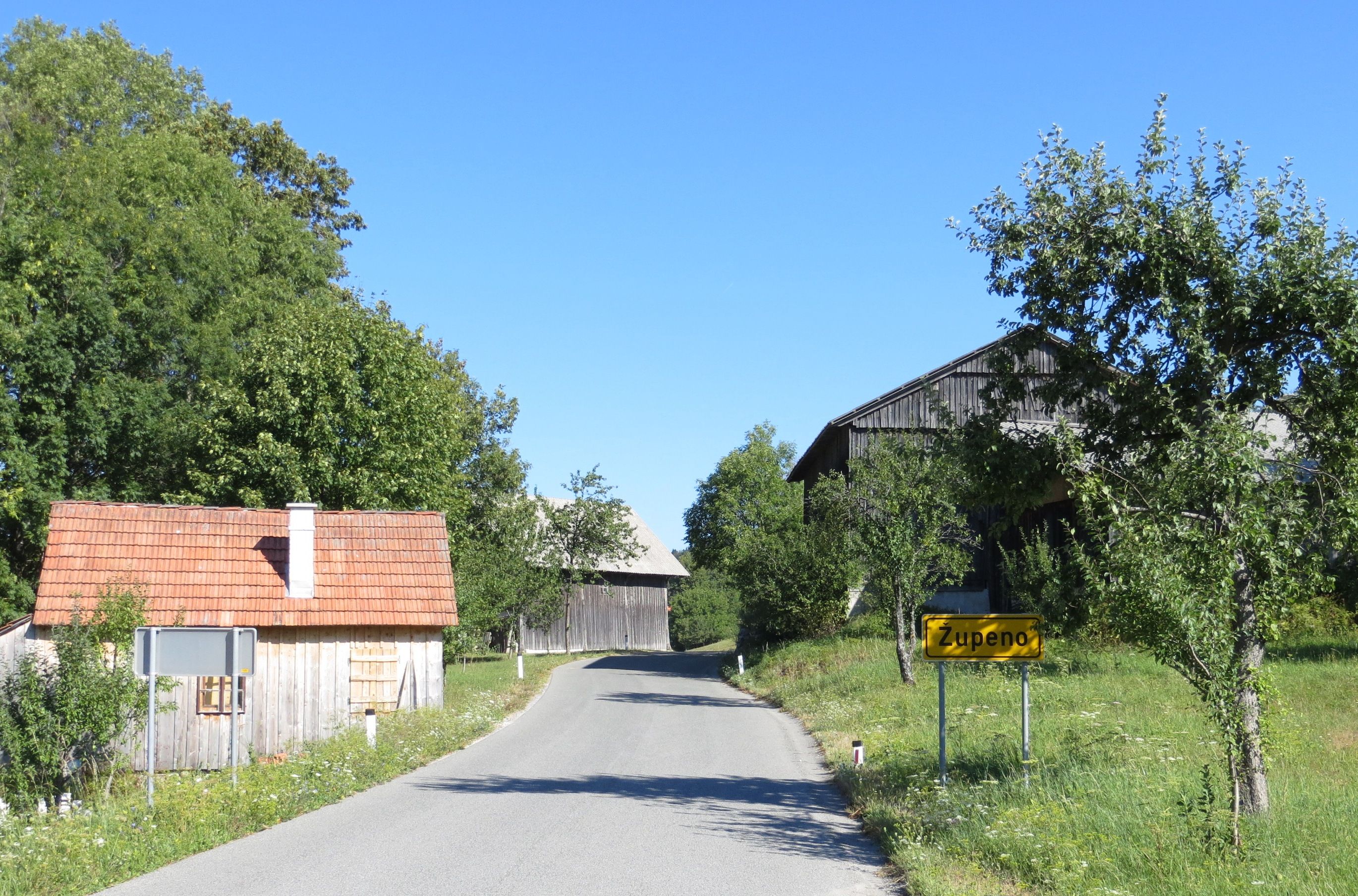

- Location in Slovenia
- Coordinates: 45°51′13.52″N 14°25′5.83″E
- Country: Slovenia
- Traditional region: Inner Carniola
- Statistical region: Littoral–Inner Carniola
- Municipality: Cerknica

Area
  - Total: 0.76 km^{2} (0.29 sq mi)
- Elevation: 798.6 m (2,620 ft)

Population (2020)
  - Total: 25
  - Density: 33/km^{2} (85/sq mi)

Župeno (pronounced [ʒuˈpeːnɔ]) is a small village north of Gorenje Otave in the Municipality of Cerknica in the Inner Carniola region of Slovenia.
