= Podslivnica =

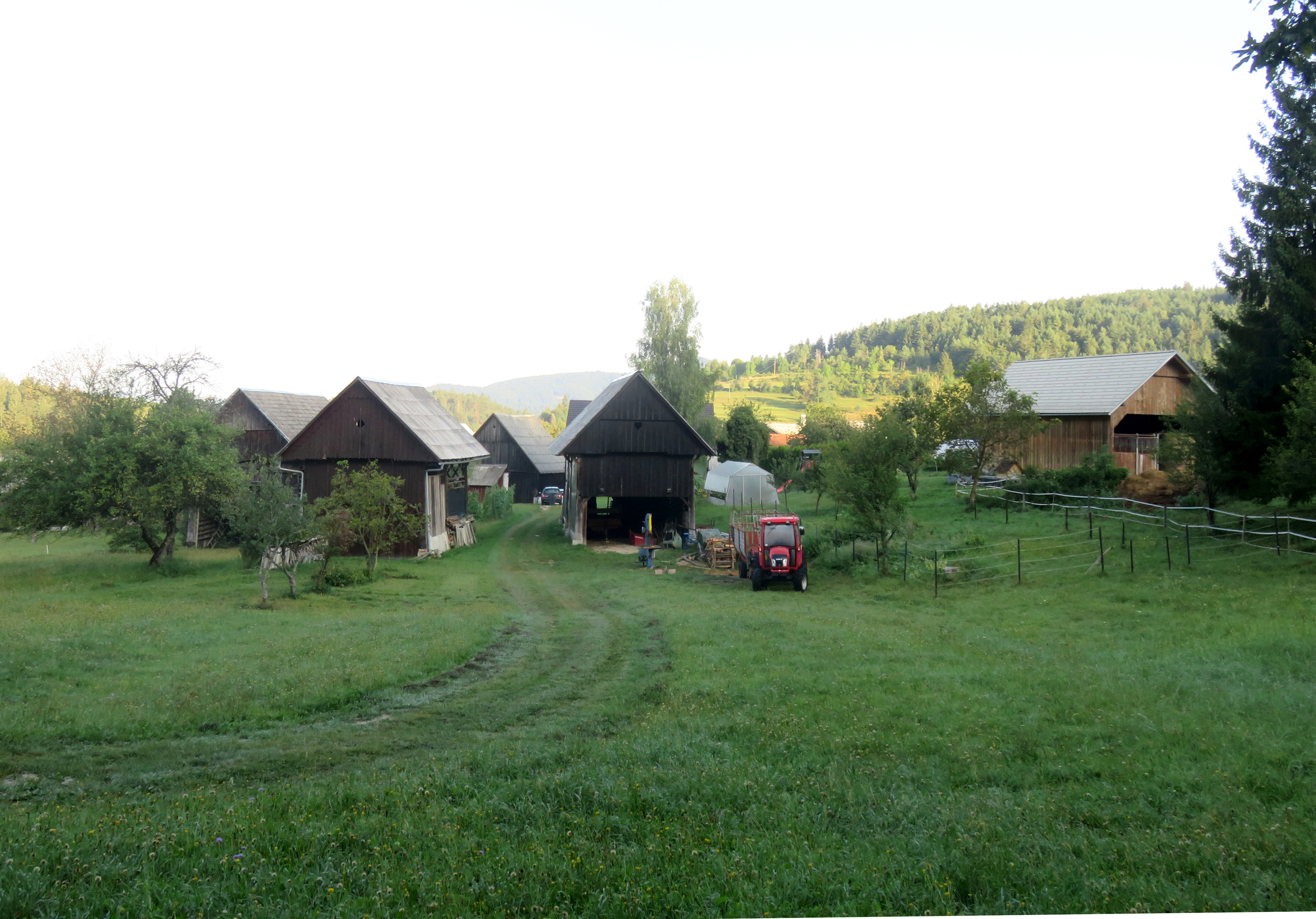

- Location in Slovenia
- Coordinates: 45°48′26.48″N 14°26′37.15″E
- Country: Slovenia
- Traditional region: Inner Carniola
- Statistical region: Littoral–Inner Carniola
- Municipality: Cerknica

Area
  - Total: 1.69 km^{2} (0.65 sq mi)
- Elevation: 669.8 m (2,198 ft)

Population (2020)
  - Total: 30
  - Density: 18/km^{2} (46/sq mi)

Podslivnica (pronounced [pɔtˈsliːu̯nitsa], German: Unterschleinitz) is a small village below the northern slopes of Mount Slivnica in the Municipality of Cerknica in the Inner Carniola region of Slovenia.

== Church ==
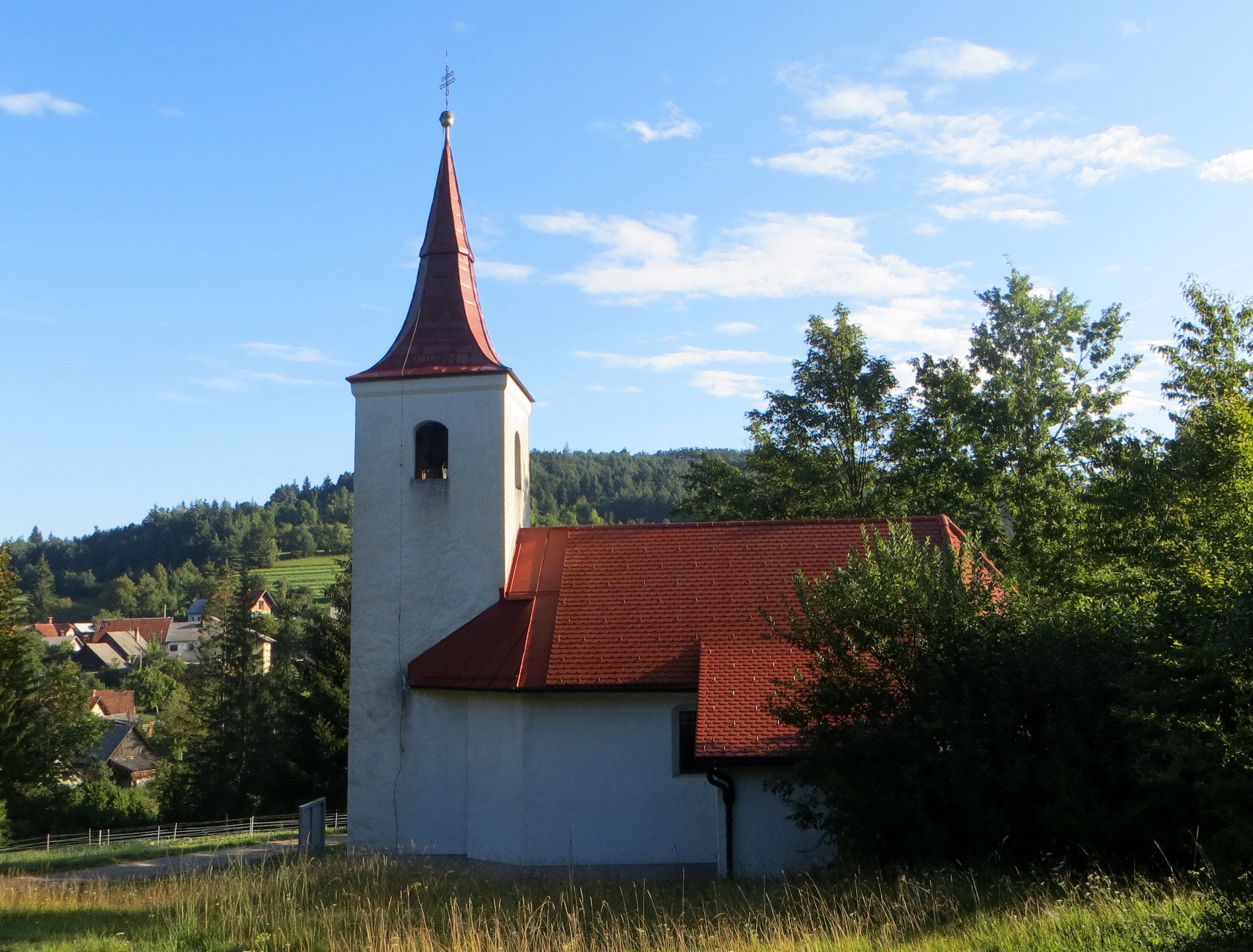
Saint Francis Xavier Church

The local church in the settlement is dedicated to Saint Francis Xavier and belongs to the Parish of Cerknica.
