= Otonica =

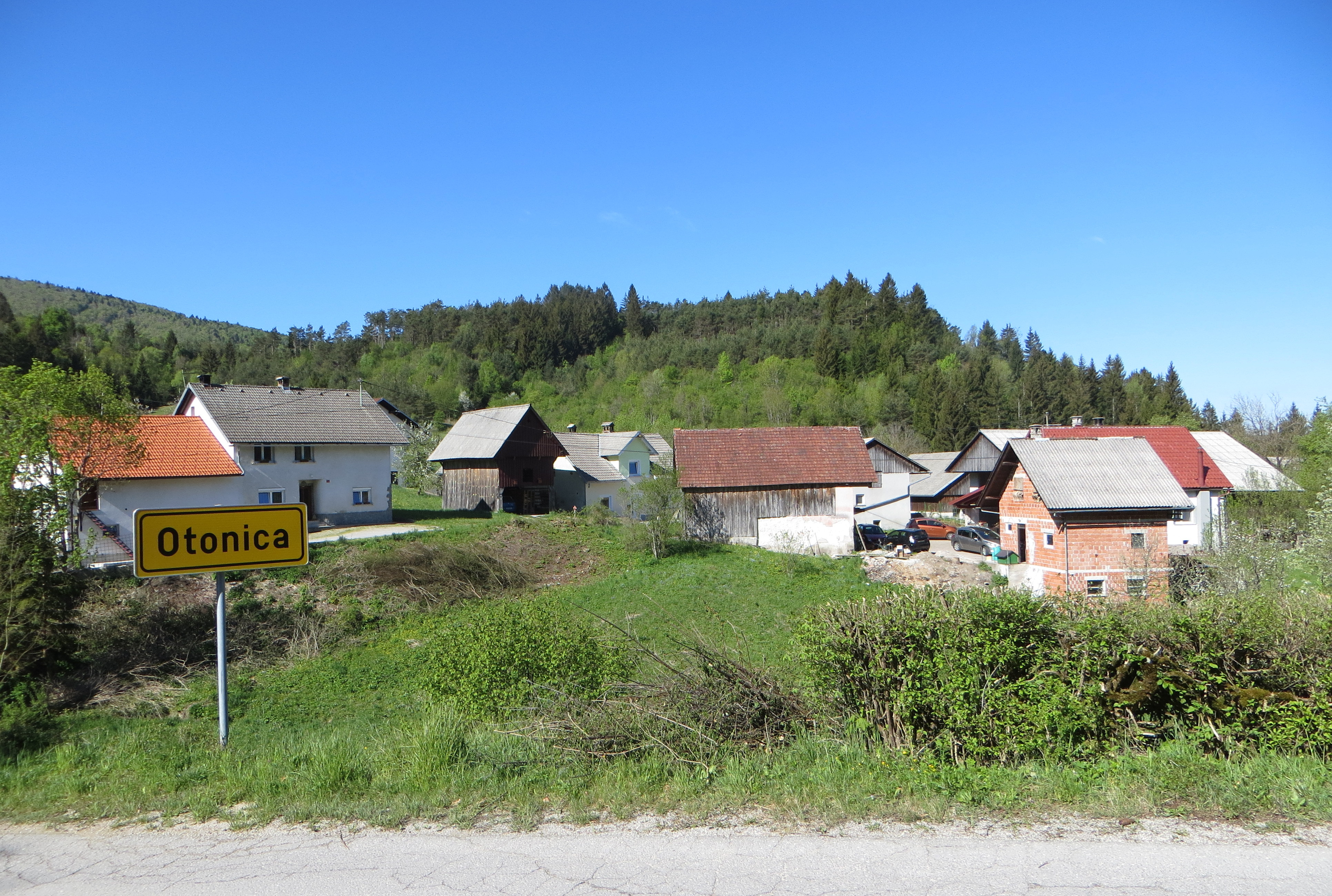

- Location in Slovenia
- Coordinates: 45°48′37.06″N 14°25′9.97″E
- Country: Slovenia
- Traditional region: Inner Carniola
- Statistical region: Littoral–Inner Carniola
- Municipality: Cerknica

Area
  - Total: 1.37 km^{2} (0.53 sq mi)
- Elevation: 630.9 m (2,070 ft)

Population (2020)
  - Total: 27
  - Density: 20/km^{2} (51/sq mi)

Otonica (pronounced [ɔtɔˈniːtsa]) is a small settlement below the northern slopes of Mount Slivnica in the Municipality of Cerknica in the Inner Carniola region of Slovenia.
