= Lešnjake =

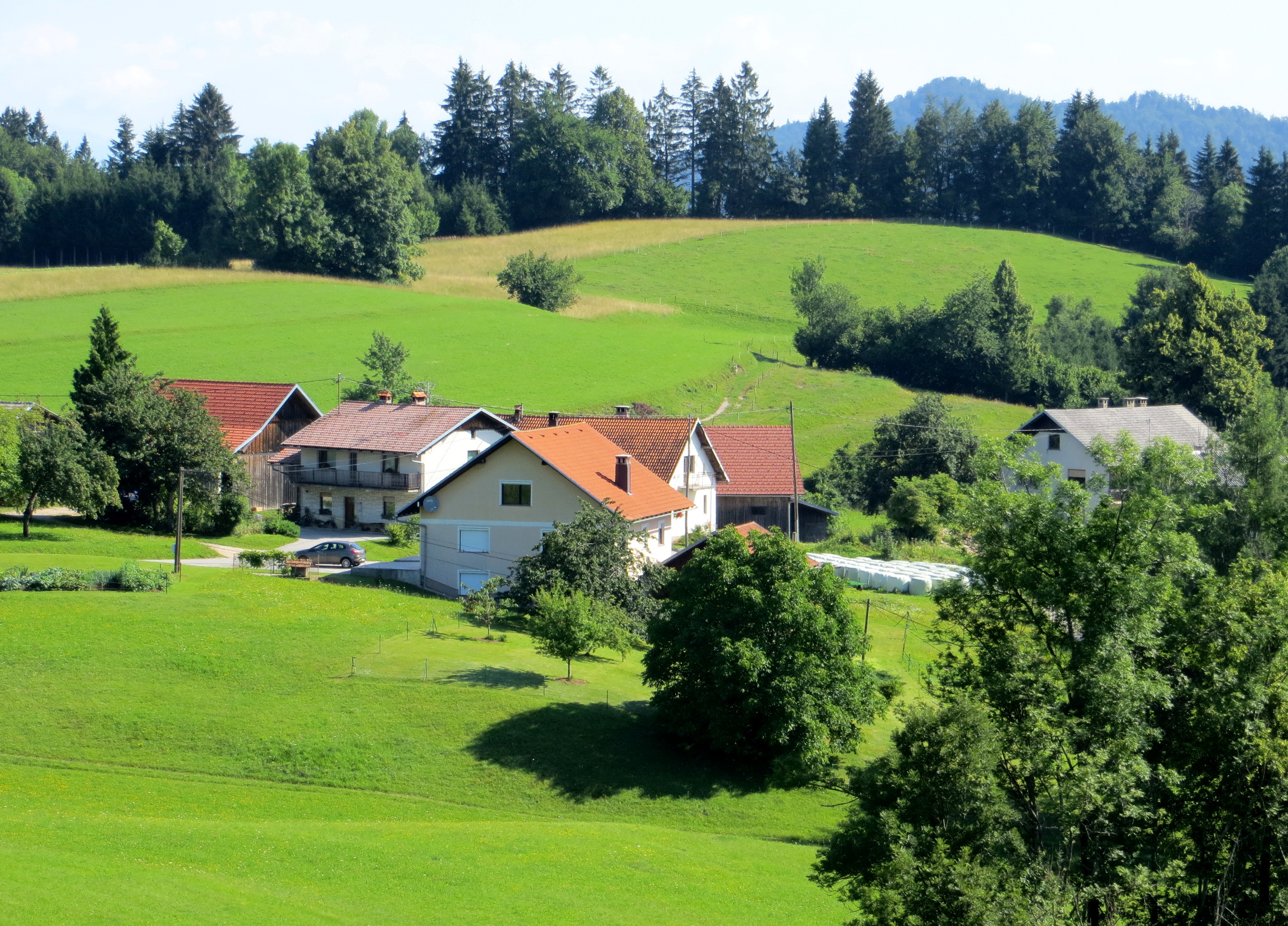

- Location in Slovenia
- Coordinates: 45°51′12.57″N 14°28′35.57″E
- Country: Slovenia
- Traditional region: Inner Carniola
- Statistical region: Littoral–Inner Carniola
- Municipality: Cerknica

Area
  - Total: 1.25 km^{2} (0.48 sq mi)
- Elevation: 801.4 m (2,629 ft)

Population (2020)
  - Total: 14
  - Density: 11/km^{2} (29/sq mi)

Lešnjake (pronounced [lɛˈʃnjaːkɛ]) is a small settlement in the hills northeast of Cerknica in the Inner Carniola region of Slovenia.
