= Korošče =

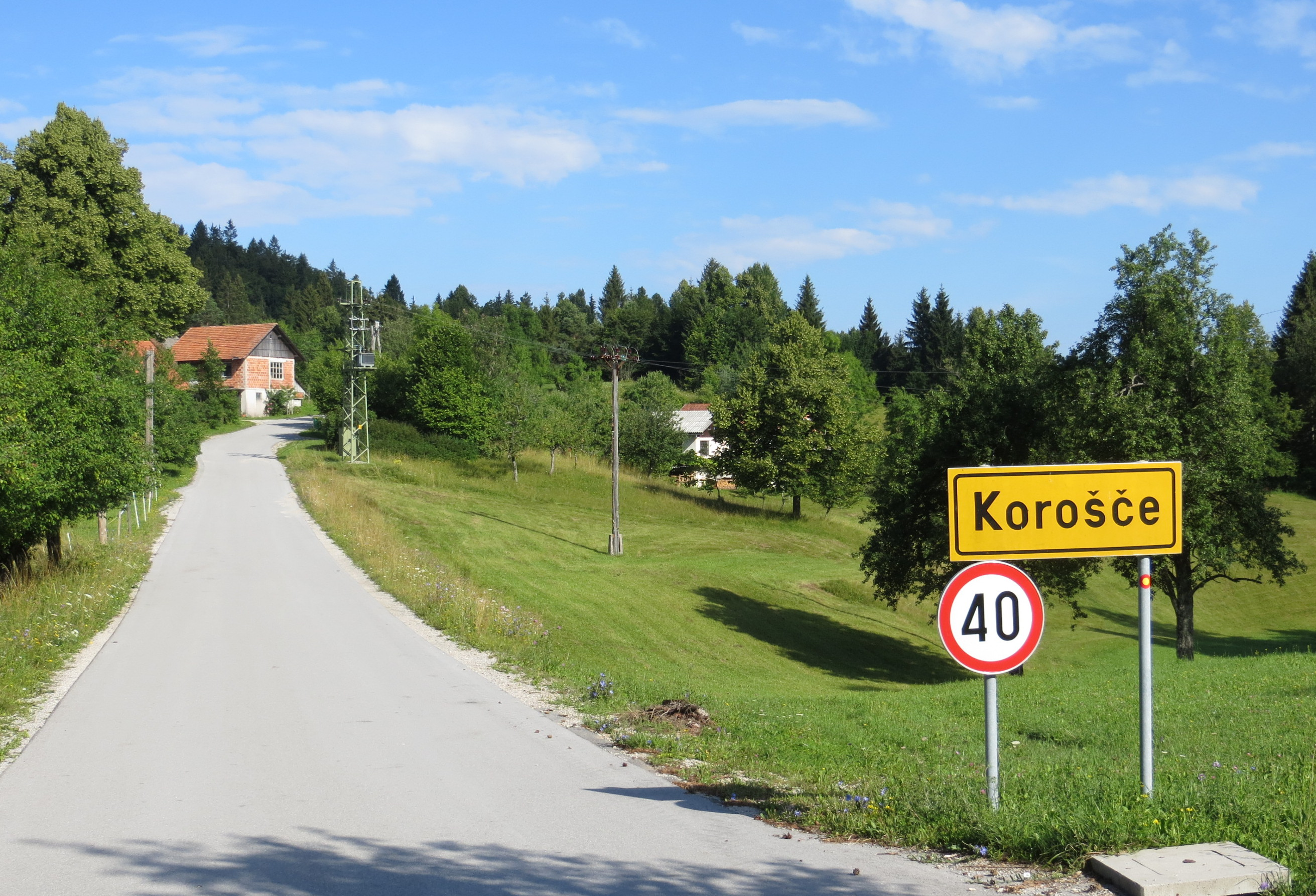

- Location in Slovenia
- Coordinates: 45°50′50.99″N 14°26′44.06″E
- Country: Slovenia
- Traditional region: Inner Carniola
- Statistical region: Littoral–Inner Carniola
- Municipality: Cerknica

Area
  - Total: 1.92 km^{2} (0.74 sq mi)
- Elevation: 827.4 m (2,715 ft)

Population (2020)
  - Total: 3
  - Density: 1.6/km^{2} (4.0/sq mi)

Korošče (pronounced [kɔˈɾoːʃtʃɛ]) is a small settlement in the hills west of Sveti Vid in the Municipality of Cerknica in the Inner Carniola region of Slovenia.
