= Slugovo =

- Location in Slovenia
- Coordinates: 45°49′17.02″N 14°27′45.68″E
- Country: Slovenia
- Traditional region: Inner Carniola
- Statistical region: Littoral–Inner Carniola
- Municipality: Cerknica

Area
  - Total: 0.71 km^{2} (0.27 sq mi)
- Elevation: 687.7 m (2,256 ft)

Population (2020)
  - Total: 18
  - Density: 25/km^{2} (66/sq mi)

Slugovo (pronounced [sluˈɡɔːʋɔ] or [sluˈɡoːʋɔ] or [ˈsluːɡɔʋɔ]) is a small settlement in the hills east of Begunje in the Municipality of Cerknica in the Inner Carniola region of Slovenia.
