= Krušče =

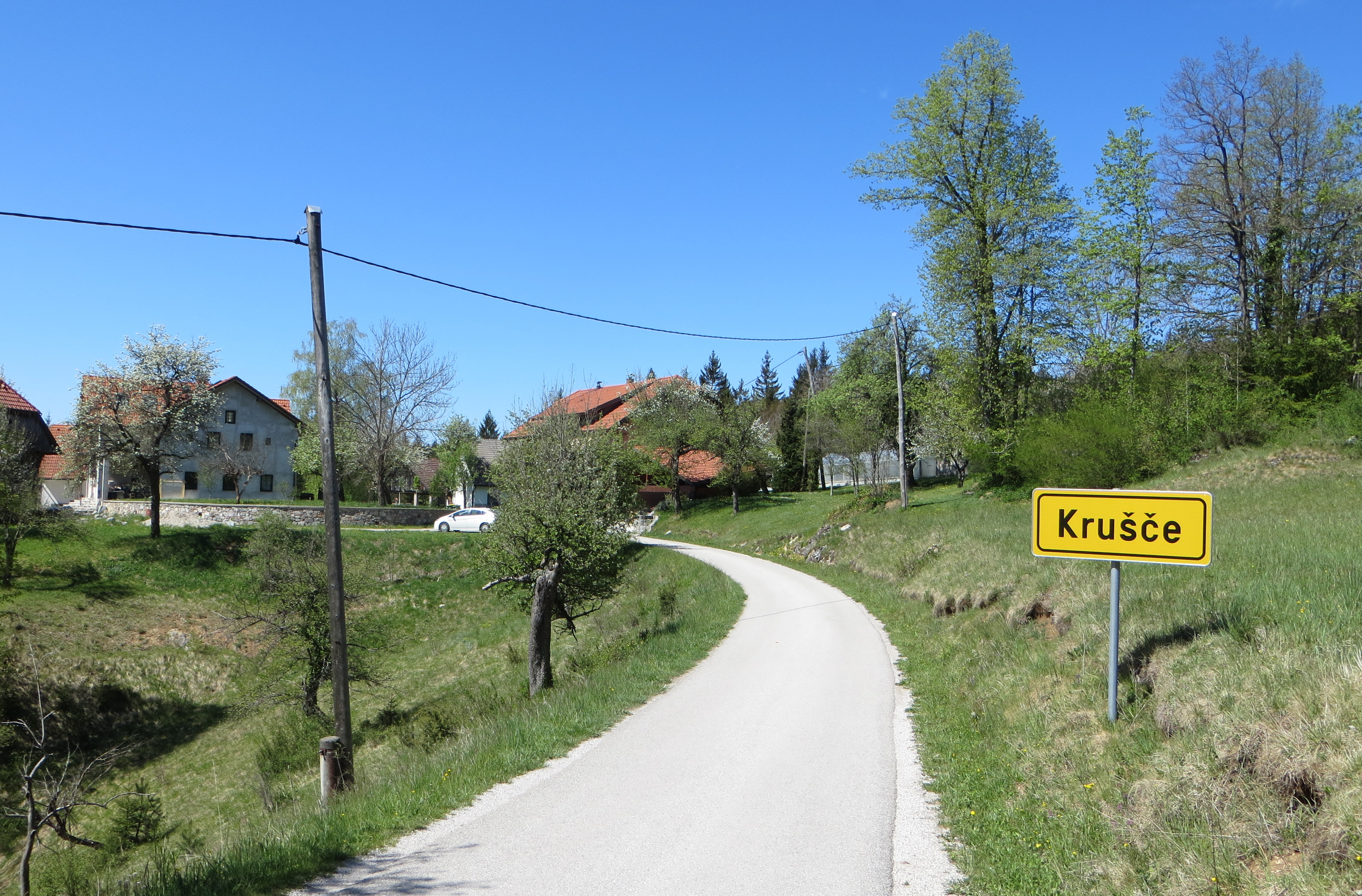

- Location in Slovenia
- Coordinates: 45°49′33.46″N 14°26′22.13″E
- Country: Slovenia
- Traditional region: Inner Carniola
- Statistical region: Littoral–Inner Carniola
- Municipality: Cerknica

Area
  - Total: 0.61 km^{2} (0.24 sq mi)
- Elevation: 668.5 m (2,193 ft)

Population (2020)
  - Total: 13
  - Density: 21/km^{2} (55/sq mi)

Krušče (pronounced [ˈkɾuːʃtʃɛ]) is a small settlement east of Begunje pri Cerknici in the Inner Carniola region of Slovenia. It lies within the Municipality of Cerknica.
