= Milava =

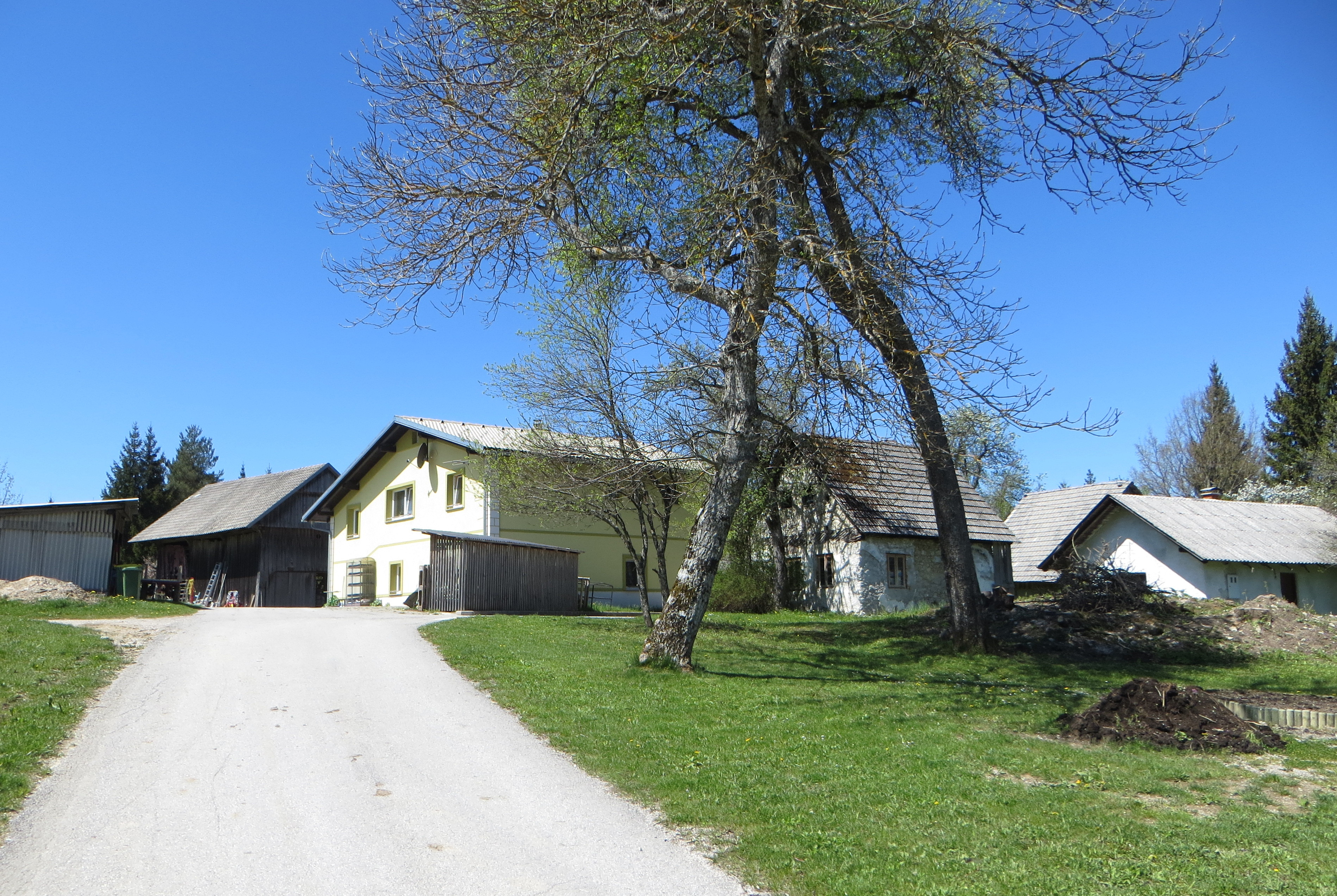

- Location in Slovenia
- Coordinates: 45°49′24.49″N 14°26′43.07″E
- Country: Slovenia
- Traditional region: Inner Carniola
- Statistical region: Littoral–Inner Carniola
- Municipality: Cerknica

Area
  - Total: 0.31 km^{2} (0.12 sq mi)
- Elevation: 634.7 m (2,082 ft)

Population (2020)
  - Total: 10
  - Density: 32/km^{2} (84/sq mi)

Milava (pronounced [miˈlaːʋa]) is a small settlement in the Cerkniščica Valley east of Begunje in the Municipality of Cerknica in the Inner Carniola region of Slovenia.
