= Zala, Cerknica =

Zala
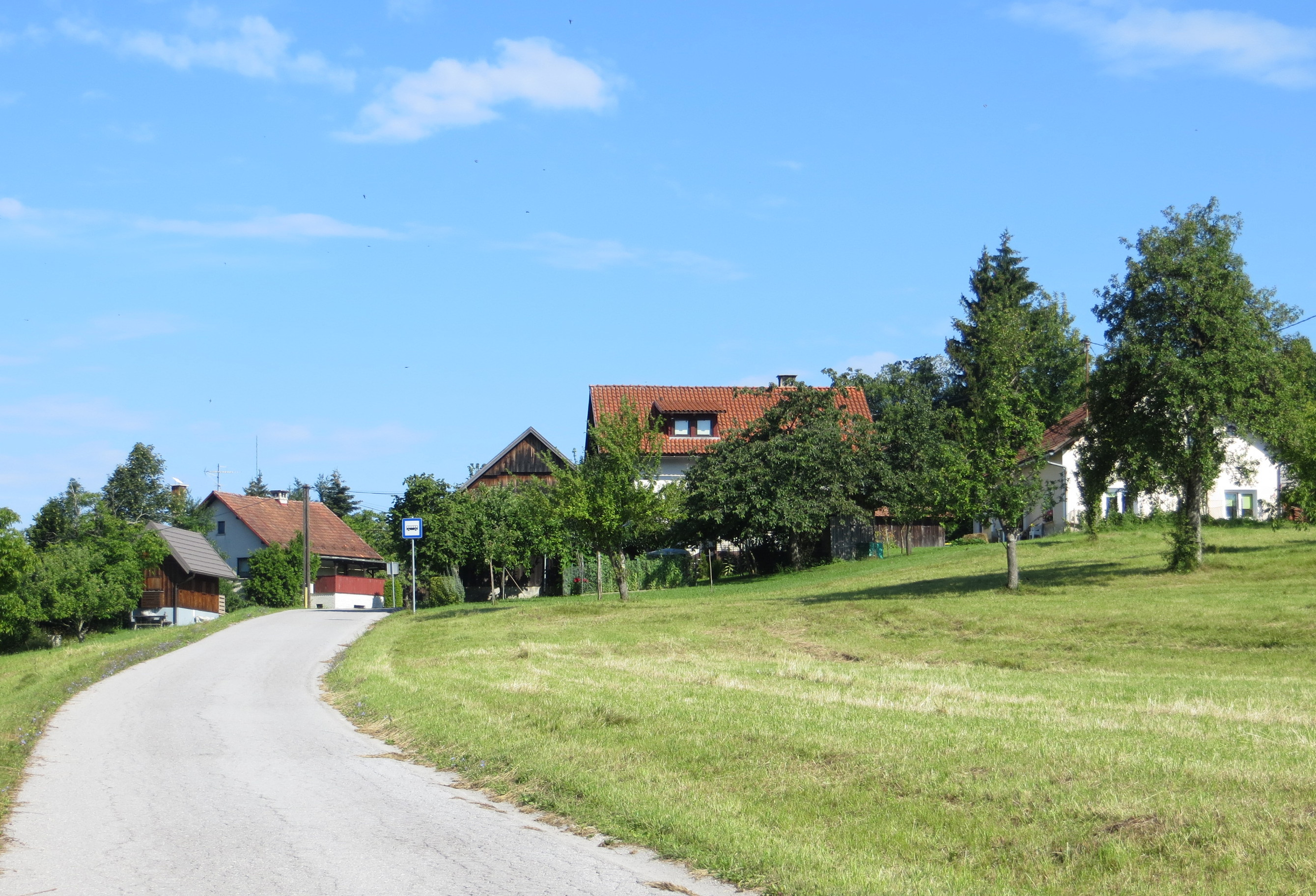

- Location in Slovenia
- Coordinates: 45°51′34.6″N 14°27′26.28″E
- Country: Slovenia
- Traditional region: Inner Carniola
- Statistical region: Littoral–Inner Carniola
- Municipality: Cerknica

Area
  - Total: 2.11 km^{2} (0.81 sq mi)
- Elevation: 842.3 m (2,763 ft)

Population (2020)
  - Total: 11
  - Density: 5.2/km^{2} (14/sq mi)

Zala (pronounced [ˈzaːla]) is a small settlement in the hills northeast of Cerknica in the Inner Carniola region of Slovenia.
