= Zibovnik =

Zibovnik Žibovnik (until 1990)
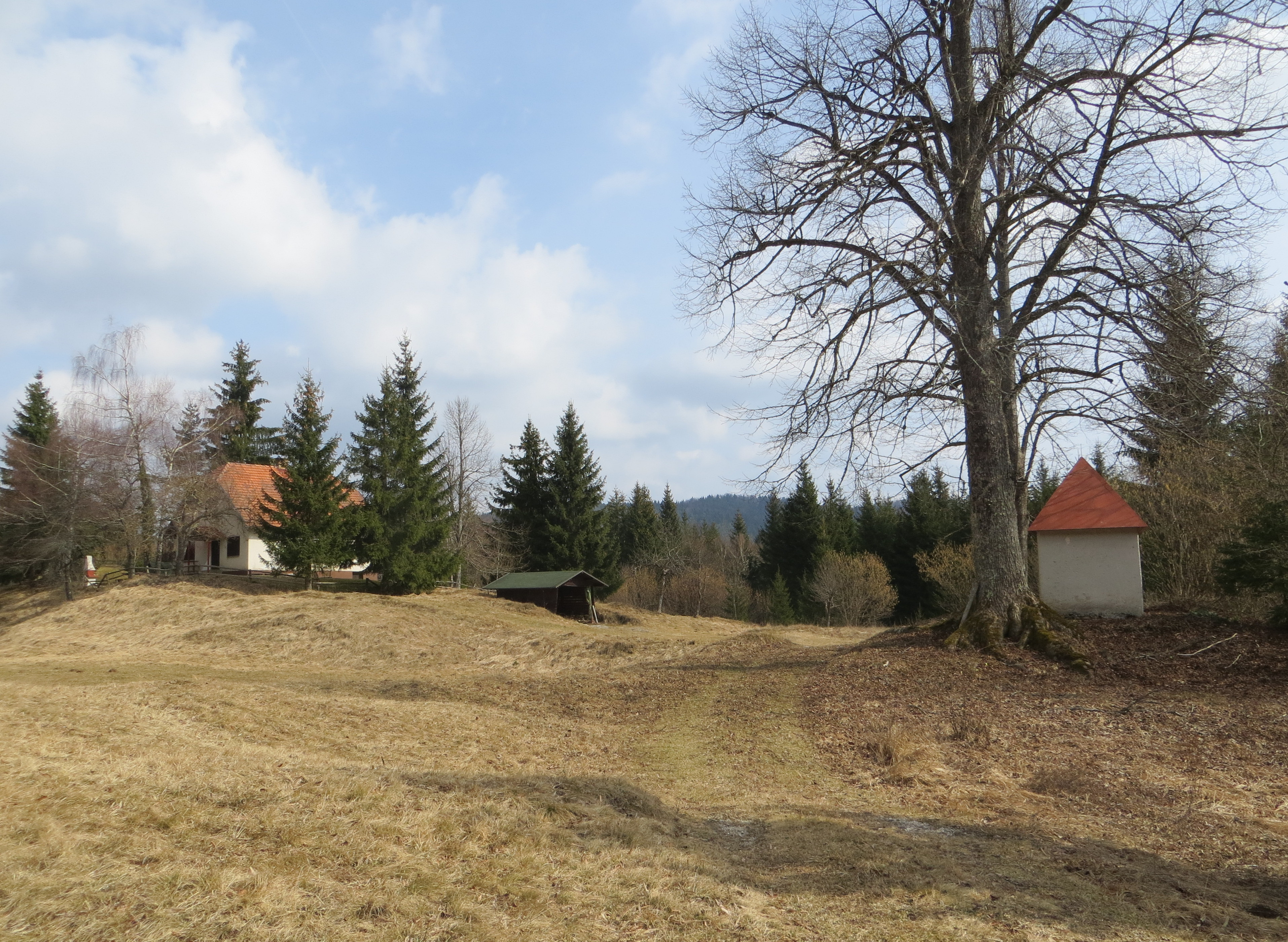

- Location in Slovenia
- Coordinates: 45°50′58.31″N 14°24′9.63″E
- Country: Slovenia
- Traditional region: Inner Carniola
- Statistical region: Littoral–Inner Carniola
- Municipality: Cerknica

Area
  - Total: 0.8 km^{2} (0.31 sq mi)
- Elevation: 790.4 m (2,593 ft)

Population (2020)
  - Total: 0

Zibovnik (pronounced [ˈziːbɔu̯nik]) is a small settlement in the hills above Otave in the Municipality of Cerknica in the Inner Carniola region of Slovenia. It no longer has any permanent residents.

== Name ==
The name of the settlement was changed from Žibovnik to Zibovnik in 1990.
