= Kržišče, Cerknica =

Kržišče
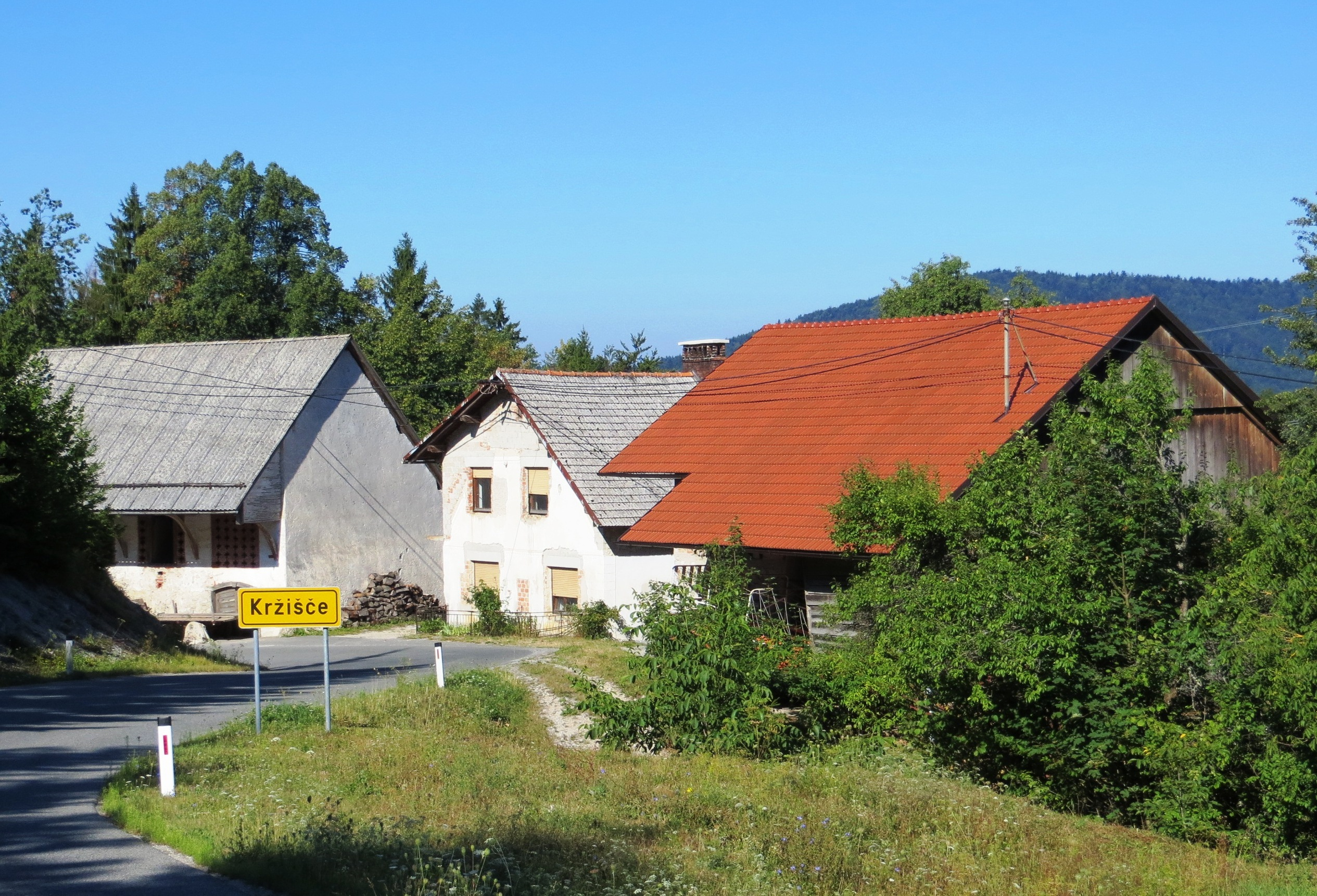

- Location in Slovenia
- Coordinates: 45°51′30.92″N 14°24′51.47″E
- Country: Slovenia
- Traditional region: Inner Carniola
- Statistical region: Littoral–Inner Carniola
- Municipality: Cerknica

Area
  - Total: 0.93 km^{2} (0.36 sq mi)
- Elevation: 819.1 m (2,687 ft)

Population (2020)
  - Total: 7
  - Density: 7.5/km^{2} (19/sq mi)

Kržišče (pronounced [kəɾˈʒiːʃtʃɛ]) is a small settlement in the hills north of Begunje in the Municipality of Cerknica in the Inner Carniola region of Slovenia.
