= Kremenca =

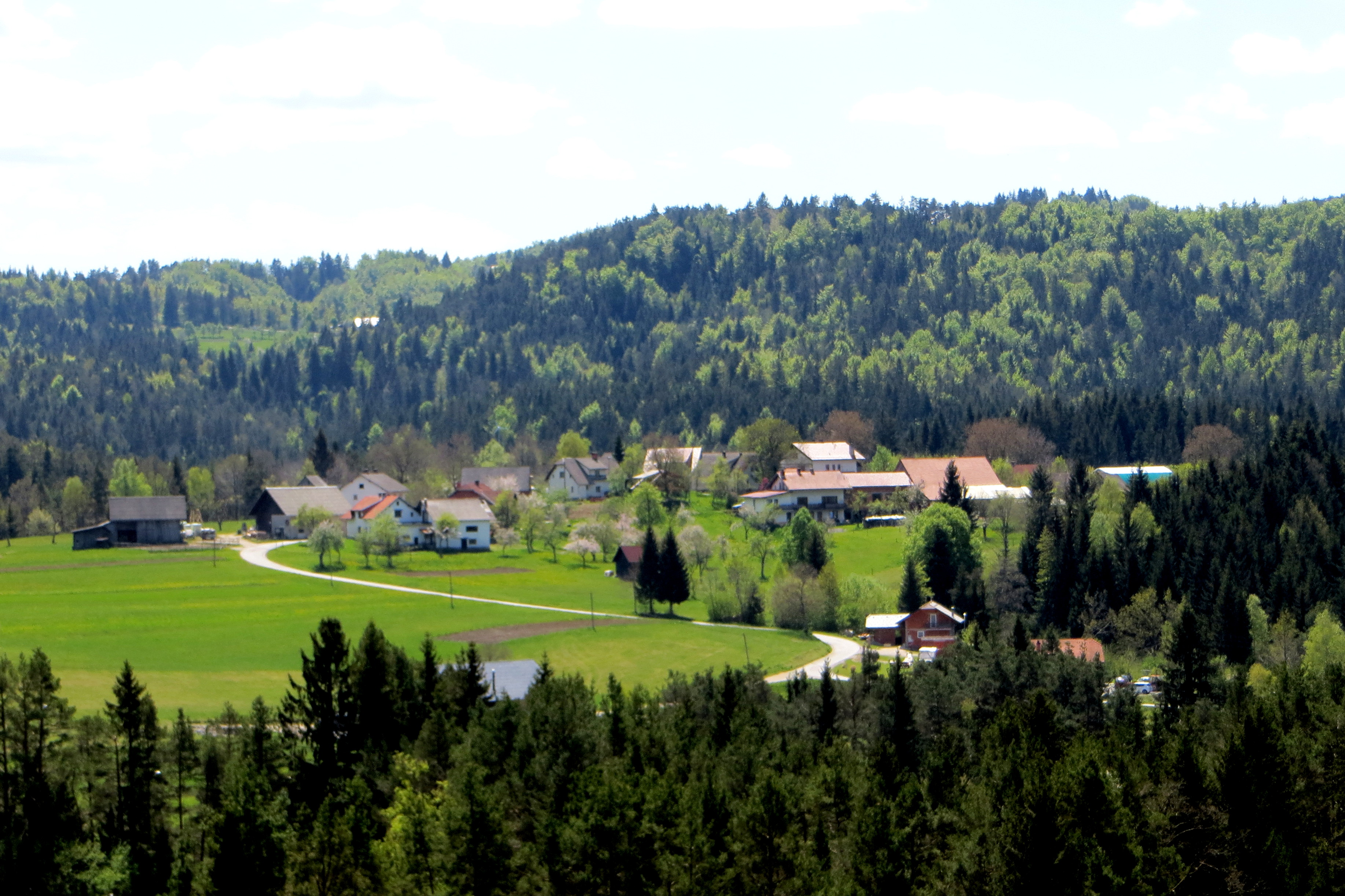

- Location in Slovenia
- Coordinates: 45°49′33.71″N 14°27′12.63″E
- Country: Slovenia
- Traditional region: Inner Carniola
- Statistical region: Littoral–Inner Carniola
- Municipality: Cerknica

Area
  - Total: 0.51 km^{2} (0.20 sq mi)
- Elevation: 667.5 m (2,190 ft)

Population (2020)
  - Total: 56
  - Density: 110/km^{2} (280/sq mi)

Kremenca (pronounced [kɾɛˈmeːntsa]; German: Kremenza) is a small settlement in the Municipality of Cerknica in the Inner Carniola region of Slovenia.
