= Koščake =

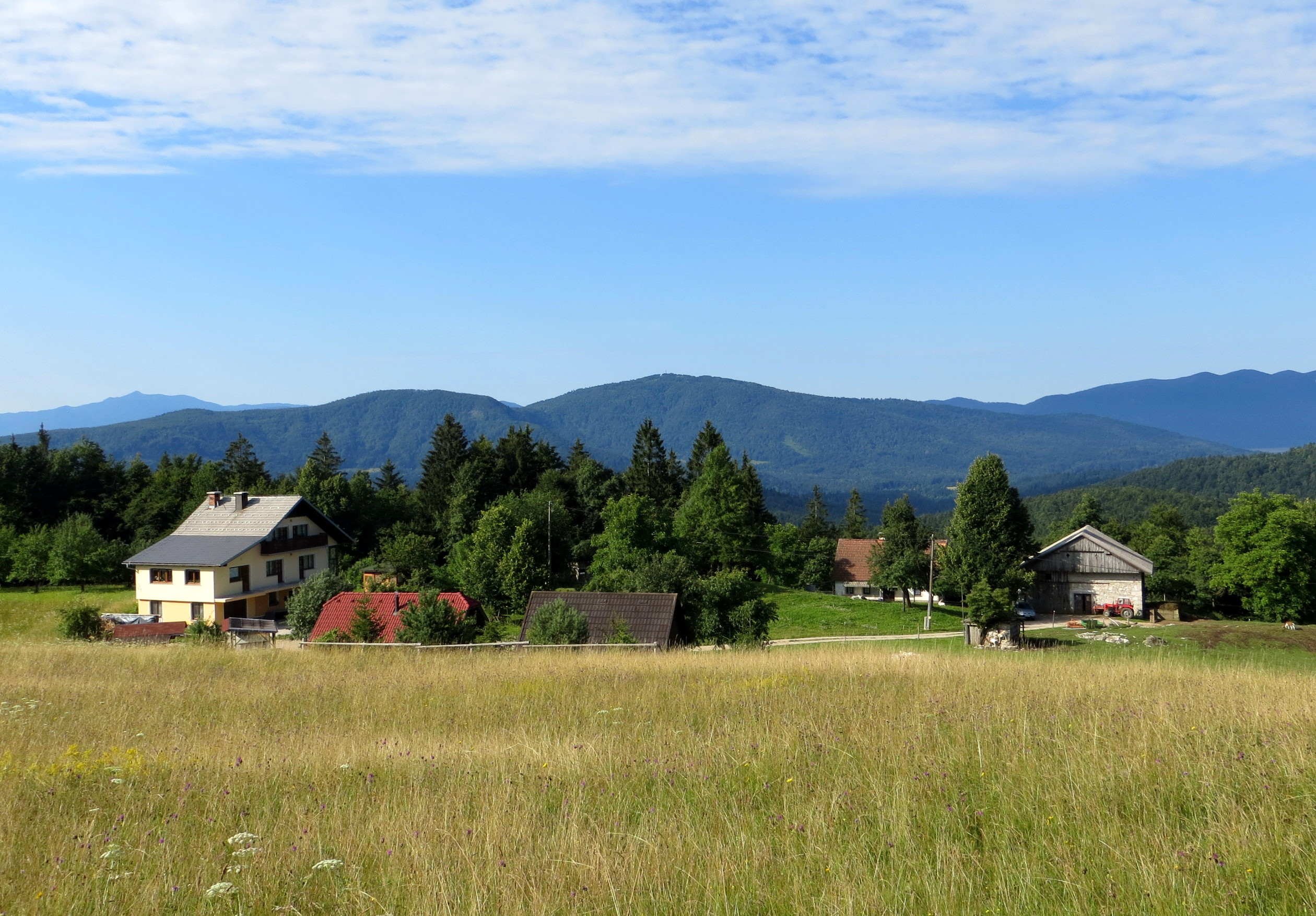

- Location in Slovenia
- Coordinates: 45°50′56.01″N 14°26′11.1″E
- Country: Slovenia
- Traditional region: Inner Carniola
- Statistical region: Littoral–Inner Carniola
- Municipality: Cerknica

Area
  - Total: 1.38 km^{2} (0.53 sq mi)
- Elevation: 849.9 m (2,788 ft)

Population (2020)
  - Total: 4
  - Density: 2.9/km^{2} (7.5/sq mi)

Koščake (pronounced [kɔˈʃtʃaːkɛ]; German: Koschake) is a remote settlement in the hills northeast of Begunje in the Municipality of Cerknica in the Inner Carniola region of Slovenia.
