= Jeršiče =

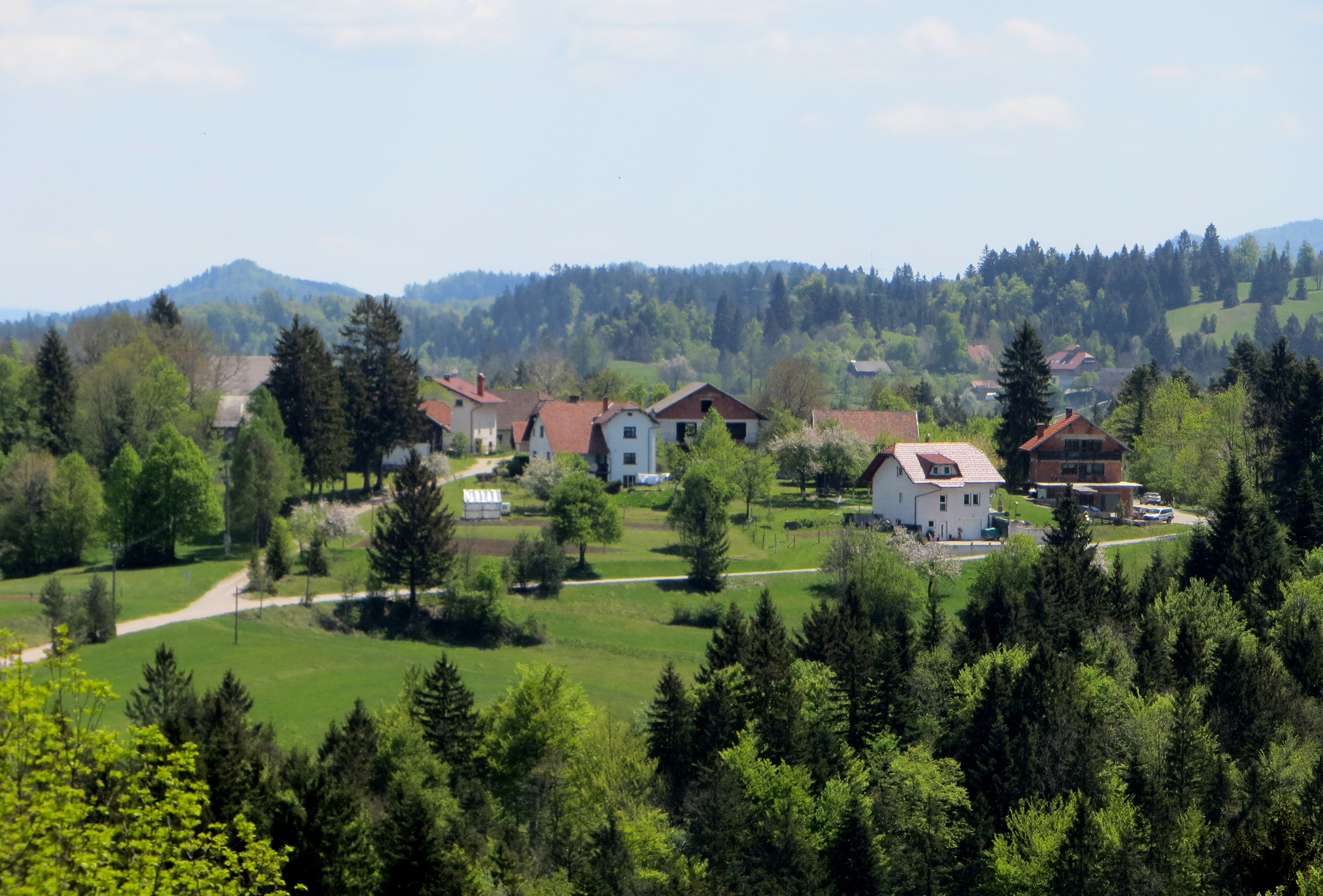

- Location in Slovenia
- Coordinates: 45°50′35.54″N 14°28′14.59″E
- Country: Slovenia
- Traditional region: Inner Carniola
- Statistical region: Littoral–Inner Carniola
- Municipality: Cerknica

Area
  - Total: 0.91 km^{2} (0.35 sq mi)
- Elevation: 818.3 m (2,685 ft)

Population (2020)
  - Total: 18
  - Density: 20/km^{2} (51/sq mi)

Jeršiče (pronounced [jɛɾˈʃiːtʃɛ]; German: Jerschitz) is a village in the hills northeast of Cerknica in the Inner Carniola region of Slovenia.
