= Ivanje Selo =

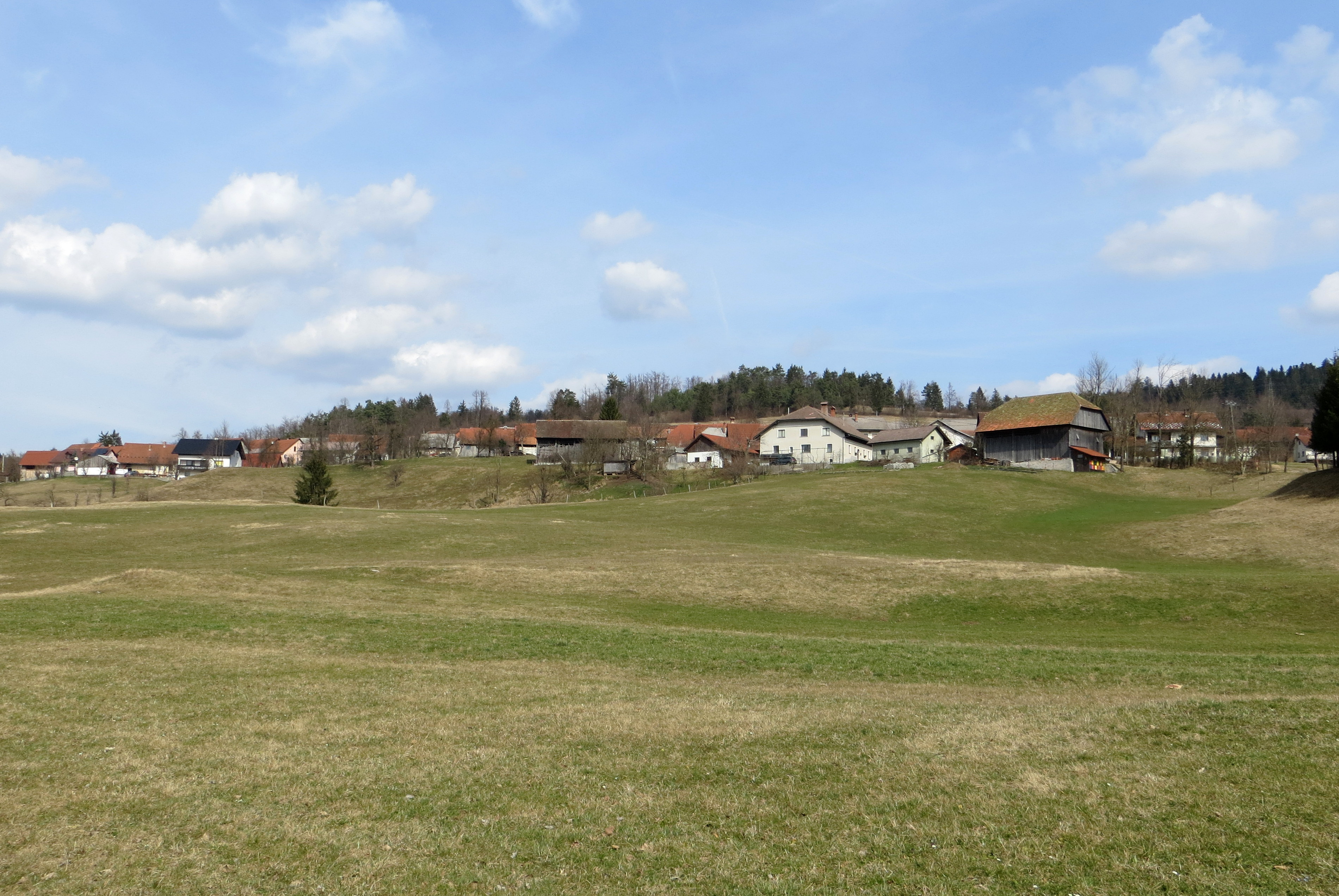

- Location in Slovenia
- Coordinates: 45°50′8.26″N 14°17′56.65″E
- Country: Slovenia
- Traditional region: Inner Carniola
- Statistical region: Littoral–Inner Carniola
- Municipality: Cerknica

Area
  - Total: 11.6 km^{2} (4.5 sq mi)
- Elevation: 536.9 m (1,761 ft)

Population (2020)
  - Total: 225
  - Density: 19.4/km^{2} (50.2/sq mi)

Ivanje Selo (pronounced [iˈʋaːnjɛ ˈsɛːlɔ]; Slovene: Ivanje selo, German: Eibenschuß) is a village north of Rakek in the Municipality of Cerknica in the Inner Carniola region of Slovenia.

== Church ==
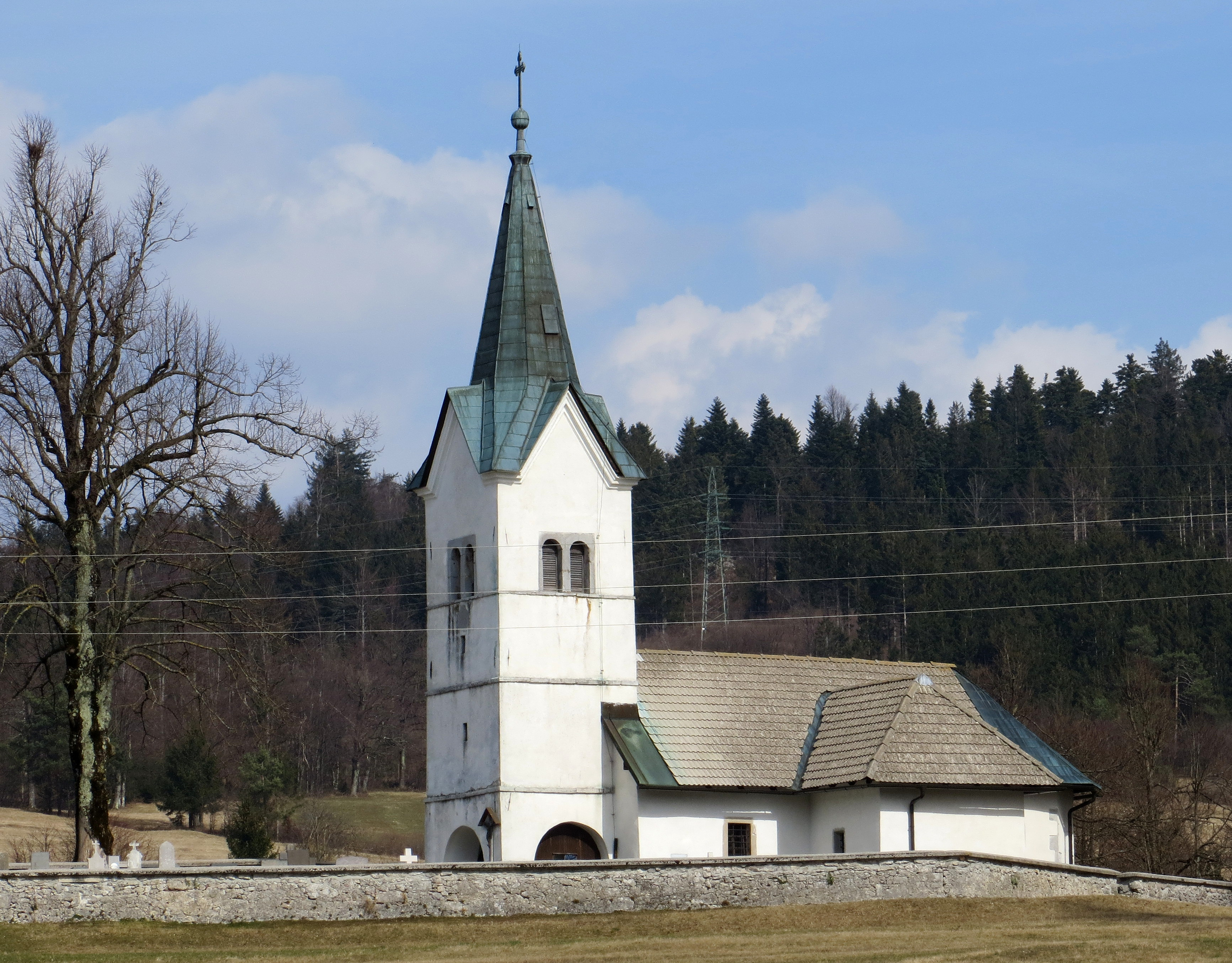
Saint Jerome's Church

The local church, built south of the settlement, is dedicated to Saint Jerome and belongs to the Parish of Unec.
