= Tavžlje =

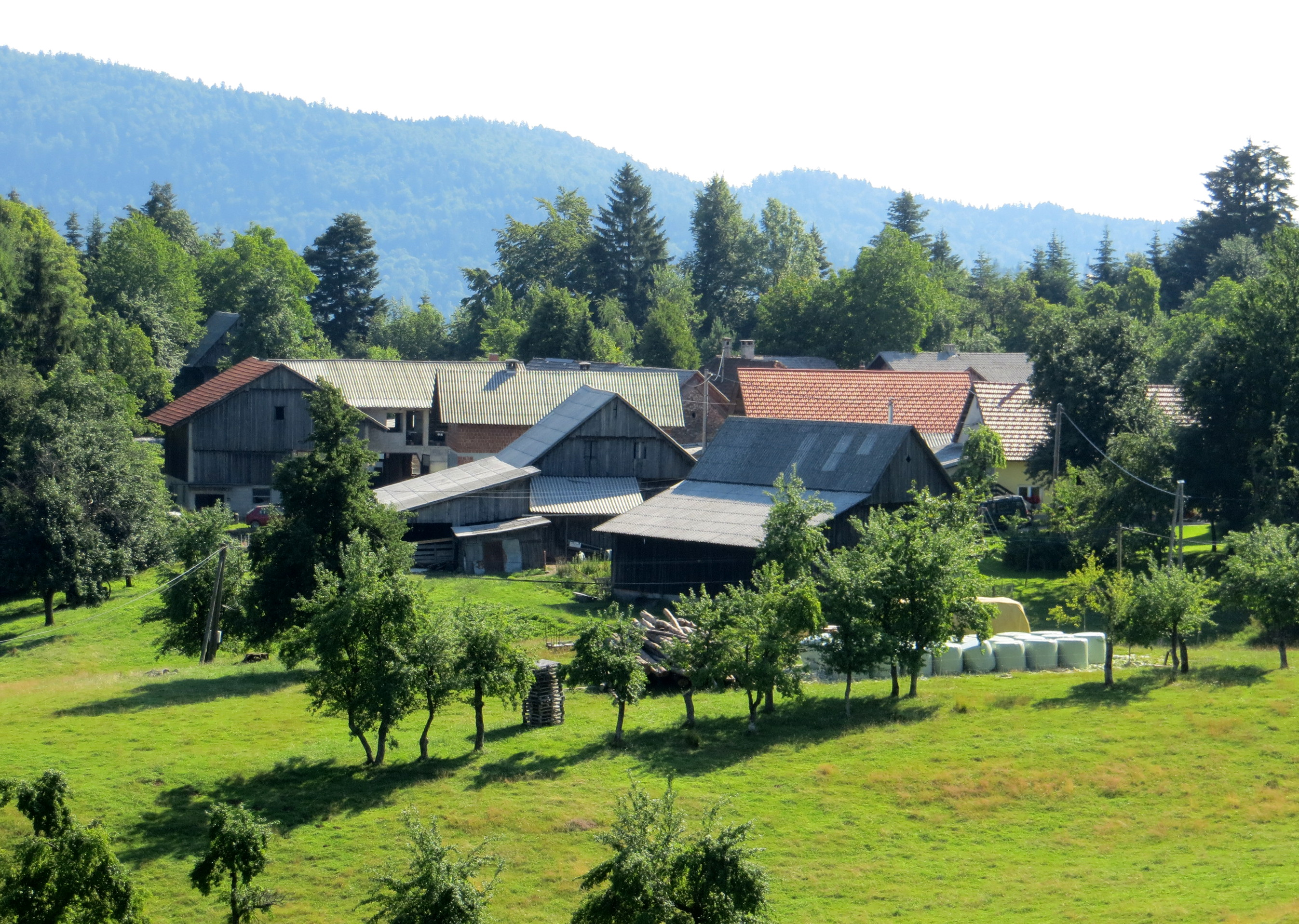

- Location in Slovenia
- Coordinates: 45°51′5.76″N 14°28′35.63″E
- Country: Slovenia
- Traditional region: Inner Carniola
- Statistical region: Littoral–Inner Carniola
- Municipality: Cerknica

Area
  - Total: 0.64 km^{2} (0.25 sq mi)
- Elevation: 805 m (2,641 ft)

Population (2020)
  - Total: 15
  - Density: 23/km^{2} (61/sq mi)

Tavžlje (pronounced [ˈtaːu̯ʒljɛ]) is a small settlement in hills northeast of Begunje in the Municipality of Cerknica in the Inner Carniola region of Slovenia.
