= Bečaje =

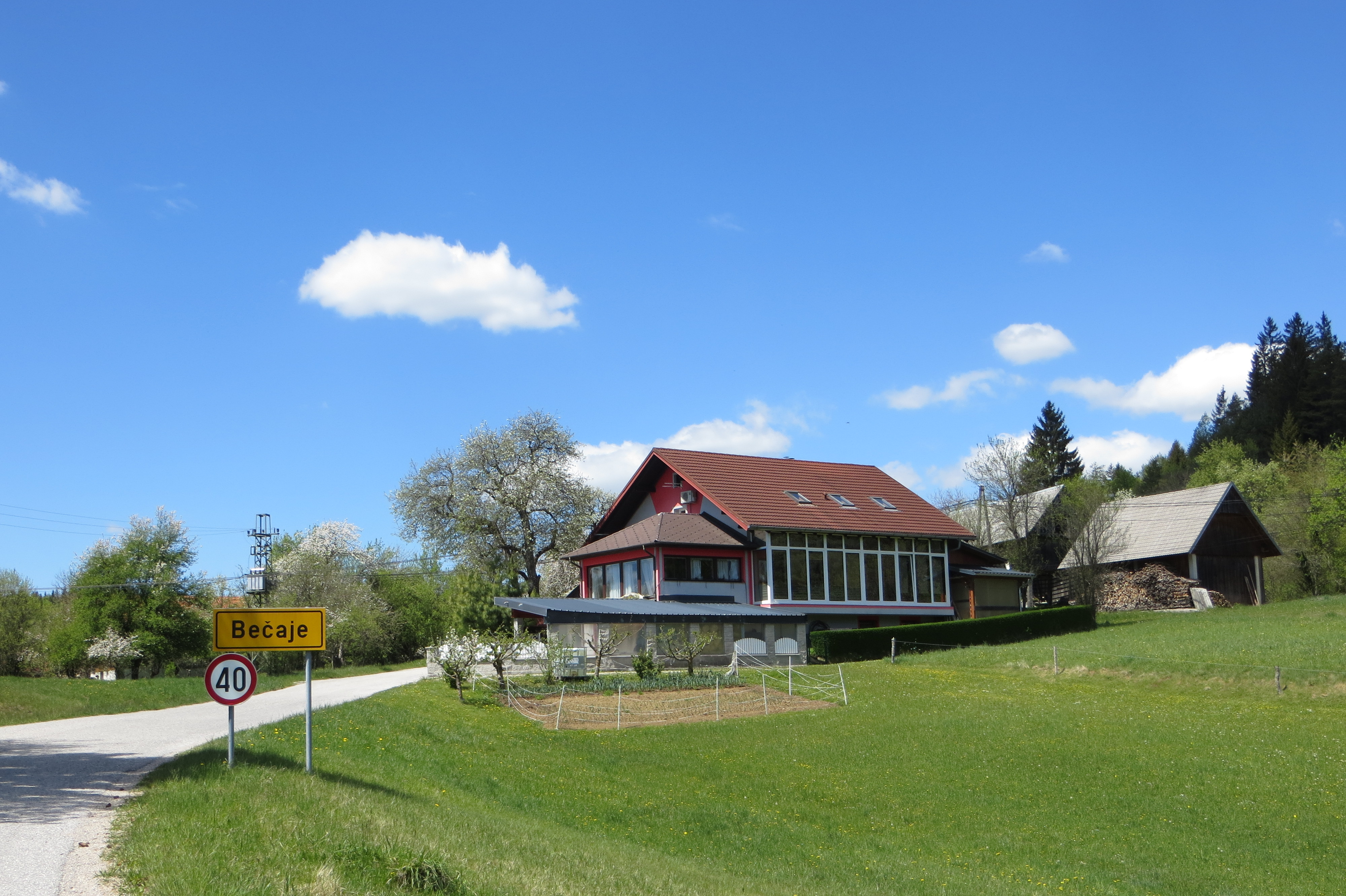

- Location in Slovenia
- Coordinates: 45°50′2.56″N 14°27′18.09″E
- Country: Slovenia
- Traditional region: Inner Carniola
- Statistical region: Littoral–Inner Carniola
- Municipality: Cerknica

Area
  - Total: 0.28 km^{2} (0.11 sq mi)
- Elevation: 641.2 m (2,104 ft)

Population (2020)
  - Total: 34
  - Density: 120/km^{2} (310/sq mi)

Bečaje (pronounced [bɛˈtʃaːjɛ]) is a small settlement northeast of Begunje pri Cerknici in the Municipality of Cerknica in the Inner Carniola region of Slovenia.
