= Reparje =

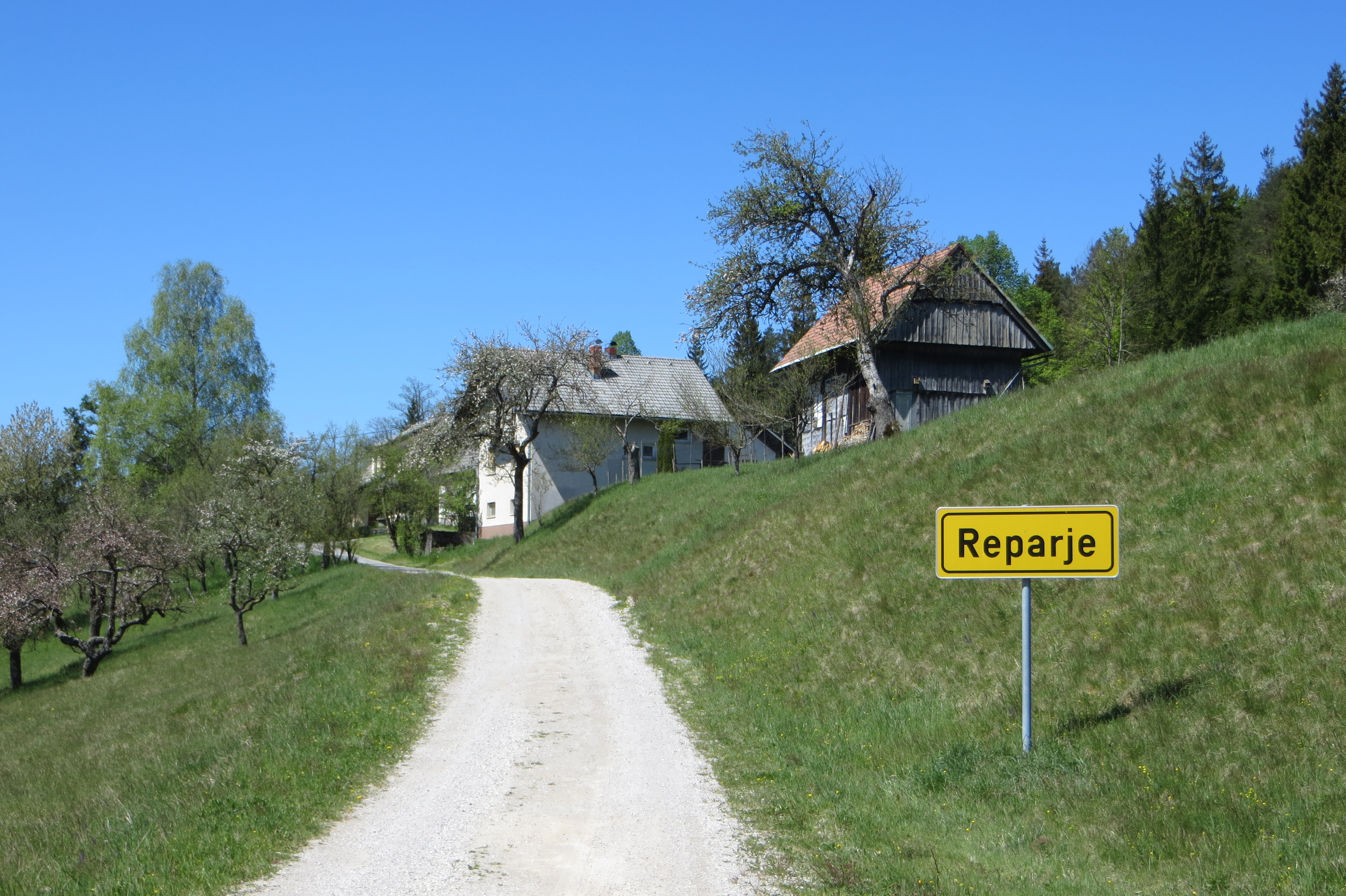

- Location in Slovenia
- Coordinates: 45°49′37.07″N 14°26′32.28″E
- Country: Slovenia
- Traditional region: Inner Carniola
- Statistical region: Littoral–Inner Carniola
- Municipality: Cerknica

Area
  - Total: 0.25 km^{2} (0.097 sq mi)
- Elevation: 632.4 m (2,075 ft)

Population (2020)
  - Total: 8
  - Density: 32/km^{2} (83/sq mi)

Reparje (pronounced [ˈɾeːpaɾjɛ]) is a small settlement in the upper part of the Cerkniščica Valley east of Begunje in the Municipality of Cerknica in the Inner Carniola region of Slovenia.
