= Pikovnik =

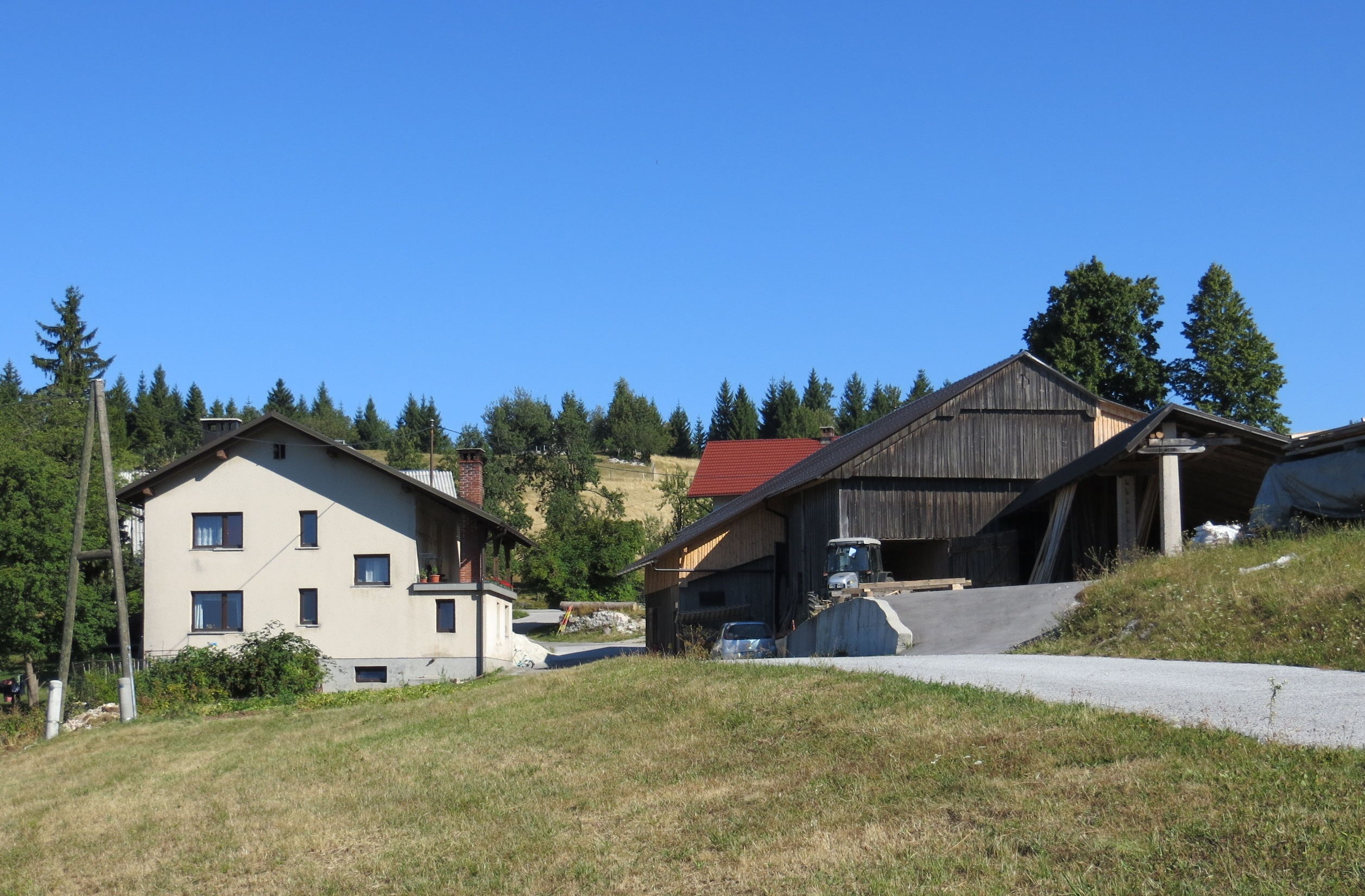

- Location in Slovenia
- Coordinates: 45°51′41.96″N 14°24′57.85″E
- Country: Slovenia
- Traditional region: Inner Carniola
- Statistical region: Littoral–Inner Carniola
- Municipality: Cerknica

Area
  - Total: 1.85 km^{2} (0.71 sq mi)
- Elevation: 859.5 m (2,820 ft)

Population (2020)
  - Total: 12
  - Density: 6.5/km^{2} (17/sq mi)

Pikovnik (pronounced [ˈpiːkɔu̯nik]) is a small remote settlement in the hills north of Begunje in the Municipality of Cerknica in the Inner Carniola region of Slovenia.
