= Pirmane =

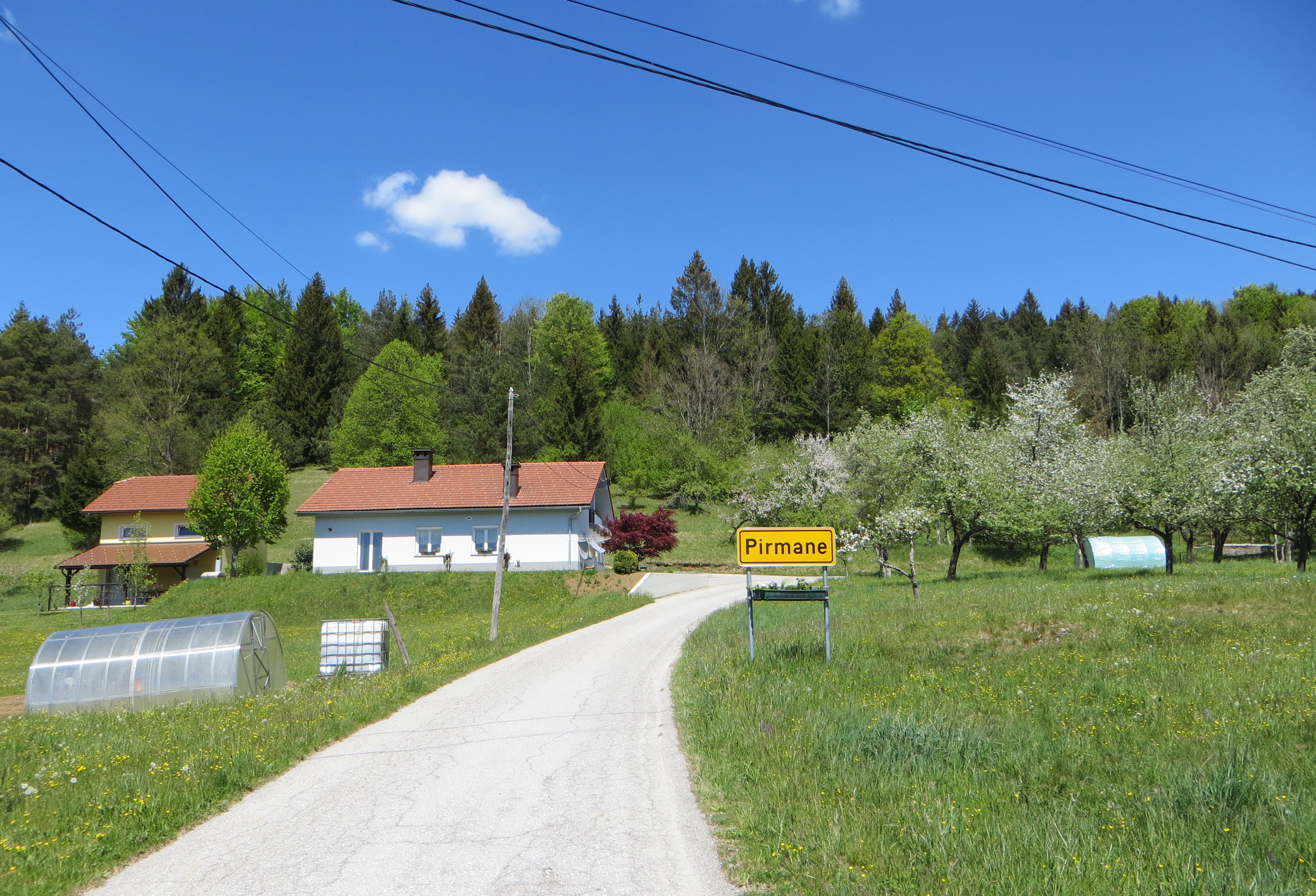

- Location in Slovenia
- Coordinates: 45°50′12.12″N 14°27′53.5″E
- Country: Slovenia
- Traditional region: Inner Carniola
- Statistical region: Littoral–Inner Carniola
- Municipality: Cerknica

Area
  - Total: 1.08 km^{2} (0.42 sq mi)
- Elevation: 680.4 m (2,232 ft)

Population (2020)
  - Total: 7
  - Density: 6.5/km^{2} (17/sq mi)

Pirmane (pronounced [ˈpiːɾmanɛ]) is a small settlement east of Begunje in the Municipality of Cerknica in the Inner Carniola region of Slovenia.
