= Deer Valley Viaduct =

Railroad viaduct in Slovenia

Coordinates: 45.919910°N 14.356990°E

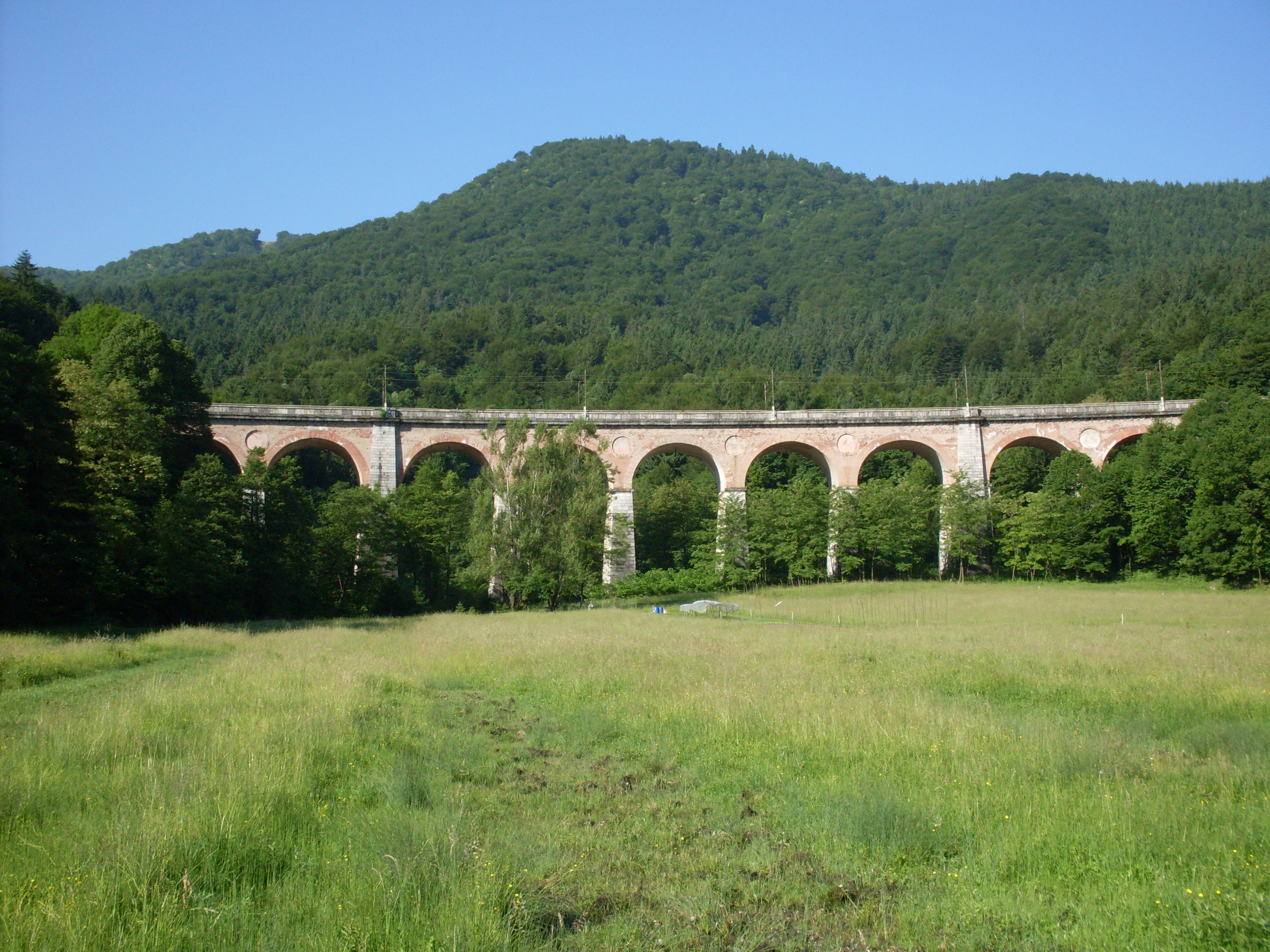

The Deer Valley Viaduct (Slovene: Jelenov most, Dolinski most, German: Hirschthaler viadukt) is a railroad viaduct between Borovnica and Laze pri Borovnici, Slovenia on the line from Vienna to Trieste vie Ljubljana. It is an 11-arch structure approximately 29 meters (95 feet) high and 230 meters (750 feet) long.

== History ==
The viaduct was built at the same time as the smaller Dol Viaduct to its north and the much larger Borovnica Viaduct to its southeast, and the line was opened in 1856. It is a stone and brick structure with oak piles driven into the ground below the supporting columns. The structure has been registered as cultural heritage due to its age and as an example of construction carried out under the Austrian Monarchy. Before 1944, the tracks were laid out to take trains from Verd to the Borovnica train station and then the Borovnica Viaduct; after 1947 the tracks were rerouted to follow the edge of the Borovnica Valley because of the destruction of the Borovnica Viaduct. At the same time, the Borovnica train station was relocated to the east side of the valley and the viaducts at Pako and Breg pri Borovnici were taken out of service.
