= Borovniščica =

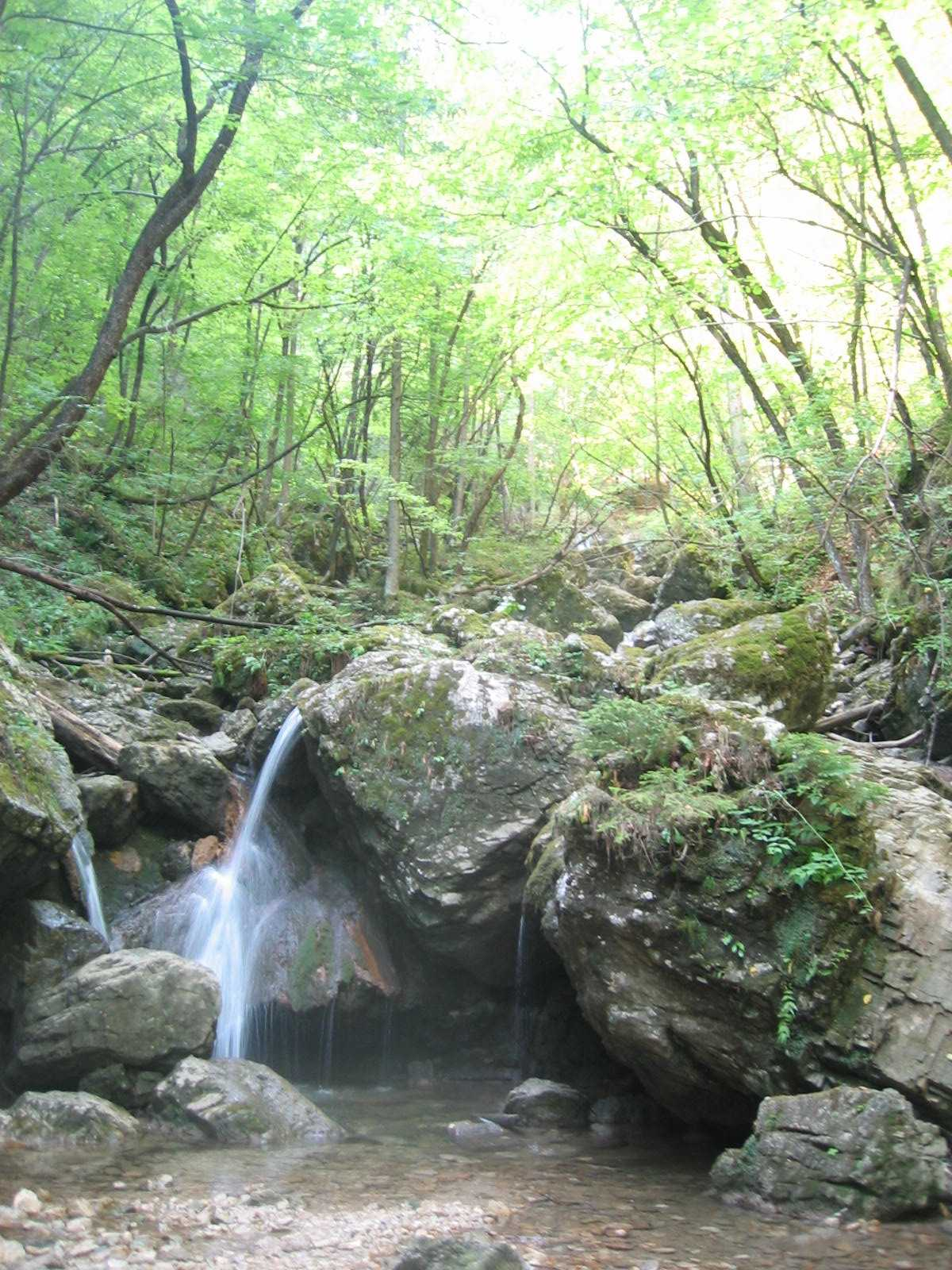
- Borovniščica Creek in Hell Gorge

Location
- Country: Slovenia

Physical characteristics
- Source
  - location: West of Gorenje Otave
- Mouth
  - location: Ljubljanica River in Dol pri Borovnici
  - coordinates: 45°57′54.95″N 14°22′3.59″E

Basin features
- Progression: Ljubljanica→ Sava→ Danube→ Black Sea

The Borovniščica (pronounced [bɔɾɔu̯ˈniːʃtʃitsa]) is a stream that originates in the hills west of Gorenje Otave and flows to the north through Hell Gorge (Slovene: Soteska Pekel), creating a series of waterfalls, and then through the village of Borovnica. It then flows across the Ljubljana Marsh, where it joins the Ljubljanica River as a right tributary. The upper course of the creek separates the Rakitna Plateau (Slovene: Rakitniška planota, to the east) from the Logatec Plateau (Slovene: Logaška planota, to the west). Although mean annual discharge has dropped by over 50% since 1961 and peak flows by about 18%, a near-doubling of discharge variability means the Borovniščica remains prone to sudden flash floods within Hell Gorge.

== Hydrology ==
The Borovniščica drains a catchment of about 34.9 km^{2} and has a mean annual discharge of about 1.09 m^{3}/s at the Borovnica gauging station. Analysis of hydrological records from 1961 to 2020 shows a significant long-term decline in flow: mean annual discharge fell from 1.45 m^{3}/s in 1961 to 0.71 m^{3}/s in 2020 (−51%), while minimum annual discharge decreased by 58.6% (from 0.50 to 0.21 m^{3}/s) and maximum annual discharge by 44.6% (from 5.87 to 3.25 m^{3}/s). Although the absolute maximum annual discharge has fallen by about 18%—from 26.9 m^{3}/s in 1961 to 21.9 m^{3}/s in 2020—the coefficient of variation of those annual maxima rose from roughly 20% in 1961–1980 to nearly 49% in 2001–2020, indicating that extreme flood events have become markedly more erratic. These trends, all statistically significant, reflect broader regional shifts in temperature, precipitation patterns, and diminished snow cover across the Dinaric Karst.

== Flood risk ==
Despite an overall reduction in average flows, the Borovniščica remains prone to flash flooding, particularly within the confined Hell Gorge. Intense, short-duration rainfall can trigger rapid spates, a phenomenon common to karst streams in this region and a hazard for downstream communities and infrastructure.

== See also ==
- List of rivers of Slovenia
