= Niževec =

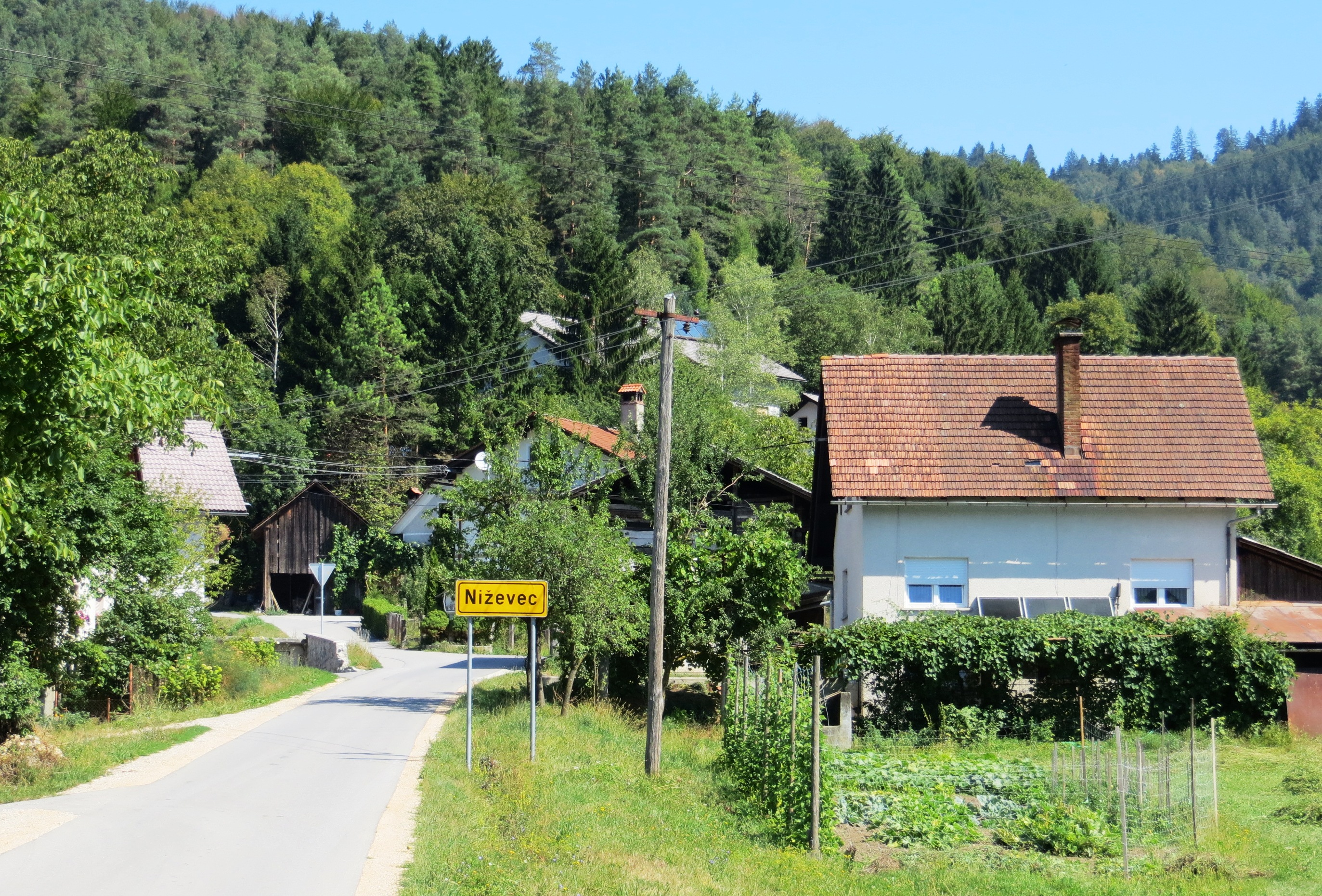

- Location in Slovenia
- Coordinates: 45°54′19.24″N 14°23′27.12″E
- Country: Slovenia
- Traditional region: Inner Carniola
- Statistical region: Central Slovenia
- Municipality: Borovnica

Area
  - Total: 1.13 km^{2} (0.44 sq mi)
- Elevation: 319.3 m (1,048 ft)

Population (2020)
  - Total: 38
  - Density: 34/km^{2} (87/sq mi)

Niževec (pronounced [ˈniːʒɛʋəts]) is a small settlement southeast of Borovnica in the Inner Carniola region of Slovenia.
