= Dražica, Borovnica =

Dražica
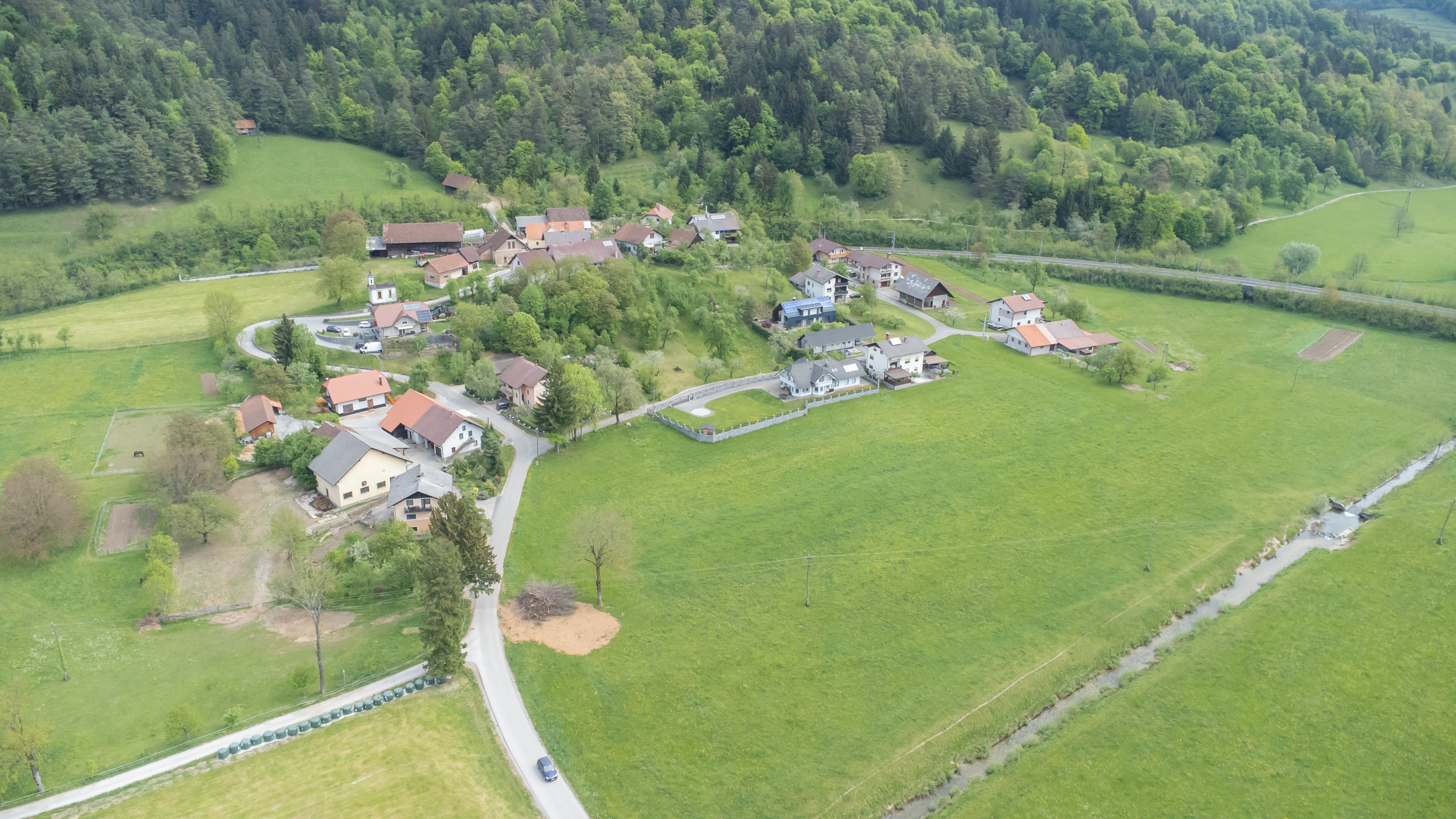

- Location in Slovenia
- Coordinates: 45°54′33.88″N 14°22′37.31″E
- Country: Slovenia
- Traditional region: Inner Carniola
- Statistical region: Central Slovenia
- Municipality: Borovnica

Area
  - Total: 0.96 km^{2} (0.37 sq mi)
- Elevation: 303.5 m (996 ft)

Population (2020)
  - Total: 97
  - Density: 100/km^{2} (260/sq mi)

Dražica (pronounced [ˈdɾaːʒitsa]) is a settlement southeast of Borovnica in the Inner Carniola region of Slovenia.

== Chapel ==
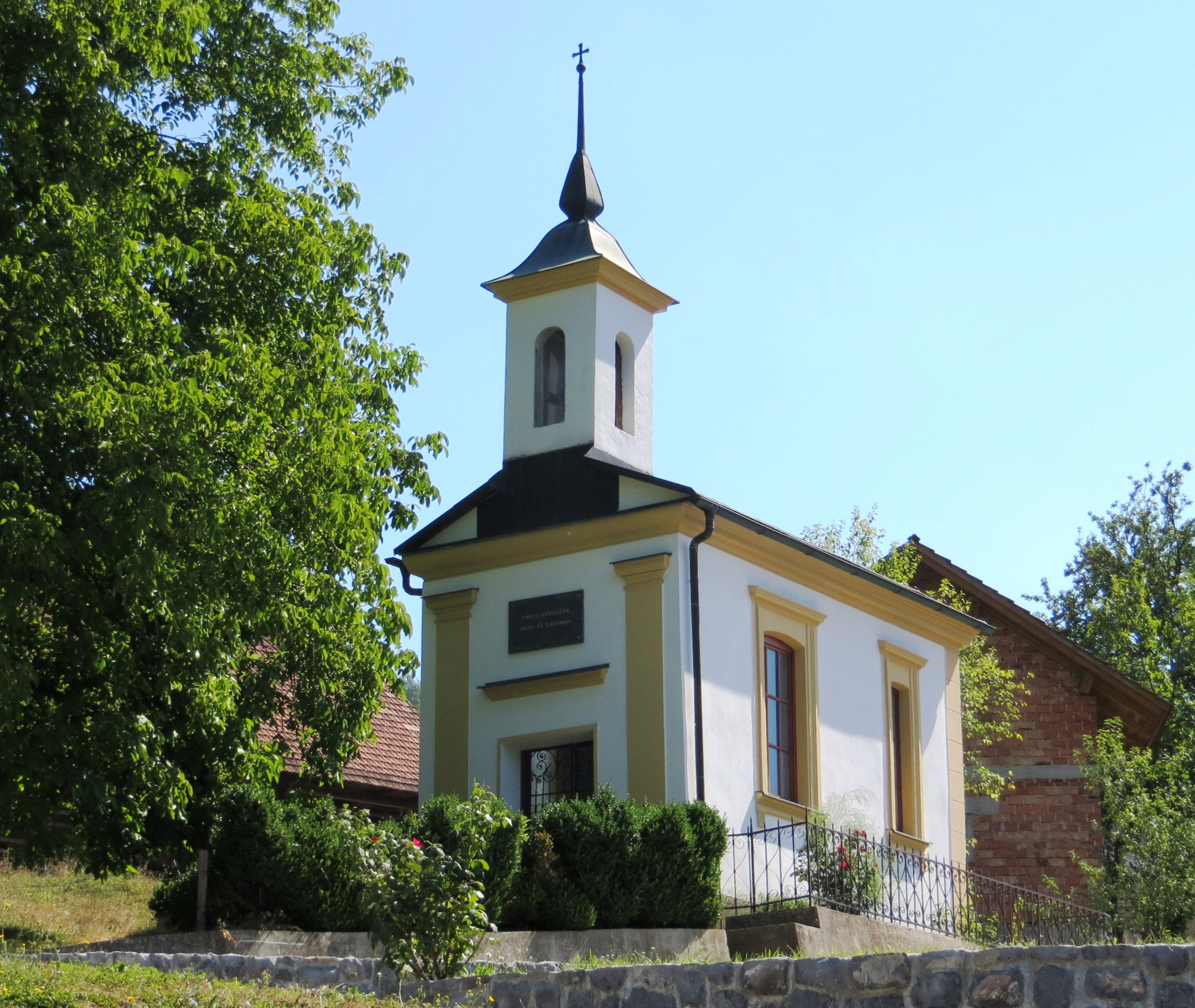
Mary Help of Christians Chapel

A chapel in the settlement is dedicated to Mary Help of Christians and belongs to the Parish of Borovnica.
