= Breg pri Borovnici =

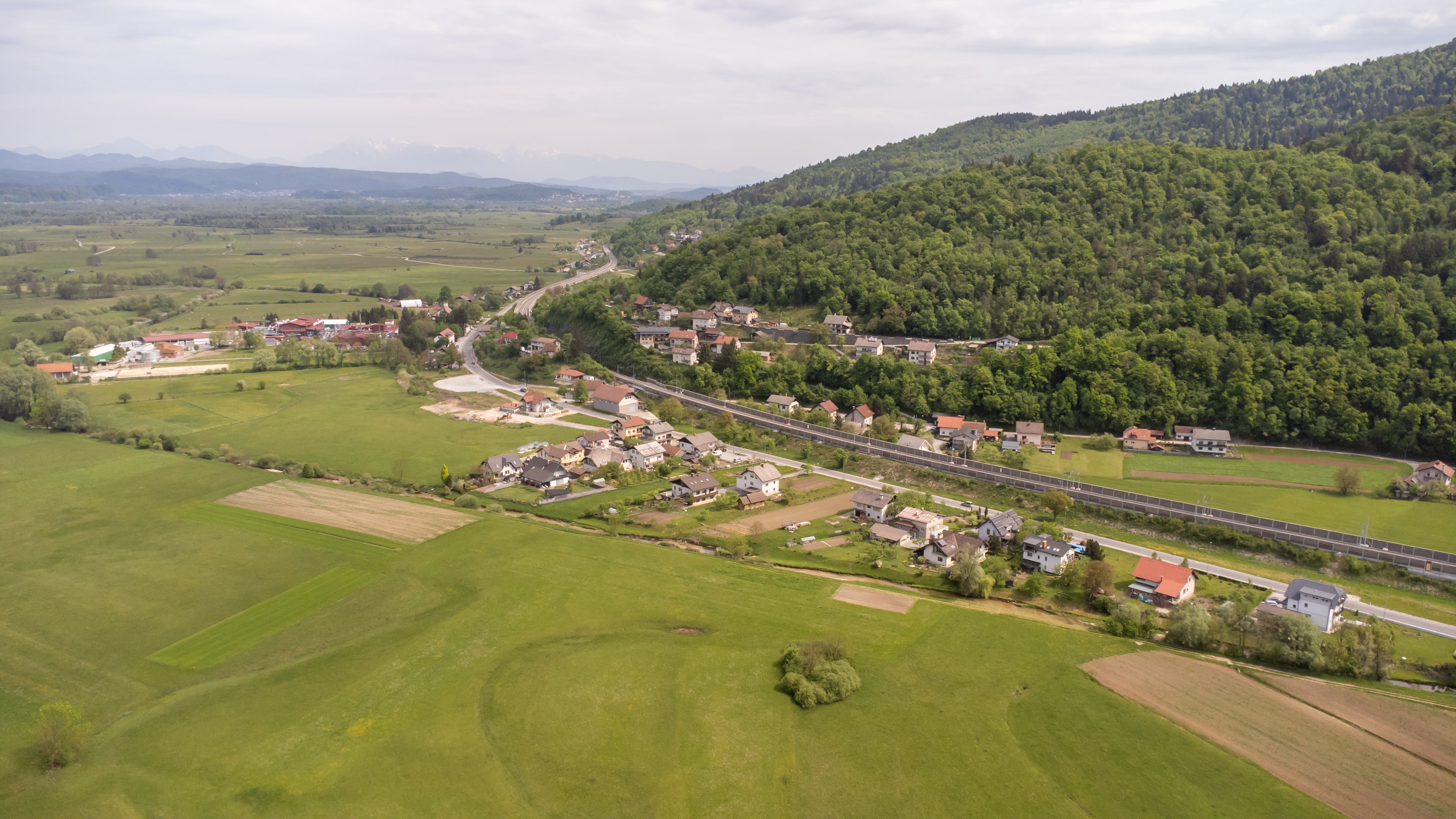

- Location in Slovenia
- Coordinates: 45°56′16.34″N 14°21′56.24″E
- Country: Slovenia
- Traditional region: Inner Carniola
- Statistical region: Central Slovenia
- Municipality: Borovnica

Area
  - Total: 3.78 km^{2} (1.46 sq mi)
- Elevation: 290.9 m (954 ft)

Population (2020)
  - Total: 375
  - Density: 99.2/km^{2} (257/sq mi)

Breg pri Borovnici (pronounced [ˈbɾéːk pɾi bɔɾɔwˈnìːtsi]) is a settlement north of Borovnica in the Inner Carniola region of Slovenia. It includes the hamlet of Trnovo to the south.

== Name ==
Breg pri Borovnici was attested in historical sources as Rippa juxta Pach in 1299. The name of the settlement was changed from Breg to Breg pri Borovnici (literally, 'Breg near Borovnica') in 1955. The toponym Breg is common in Slovenia and is derived from the common noun breg '(river) bank, slope', but may also refer to creeks and other running water; in this case, Borovniščica Creek runs through Breg pri Borovnici.

== History ==
A wood company operated in Breg pri Borovnica before the Second World War. The village was burned during the war by Italian forces on 13 August 1942. A new railroad line was built through Breg pri Borovnici in 1947, cutting off the hamlet of Trnovo from the main part of the village.
