= Pristava, Borovnica =

Pristava
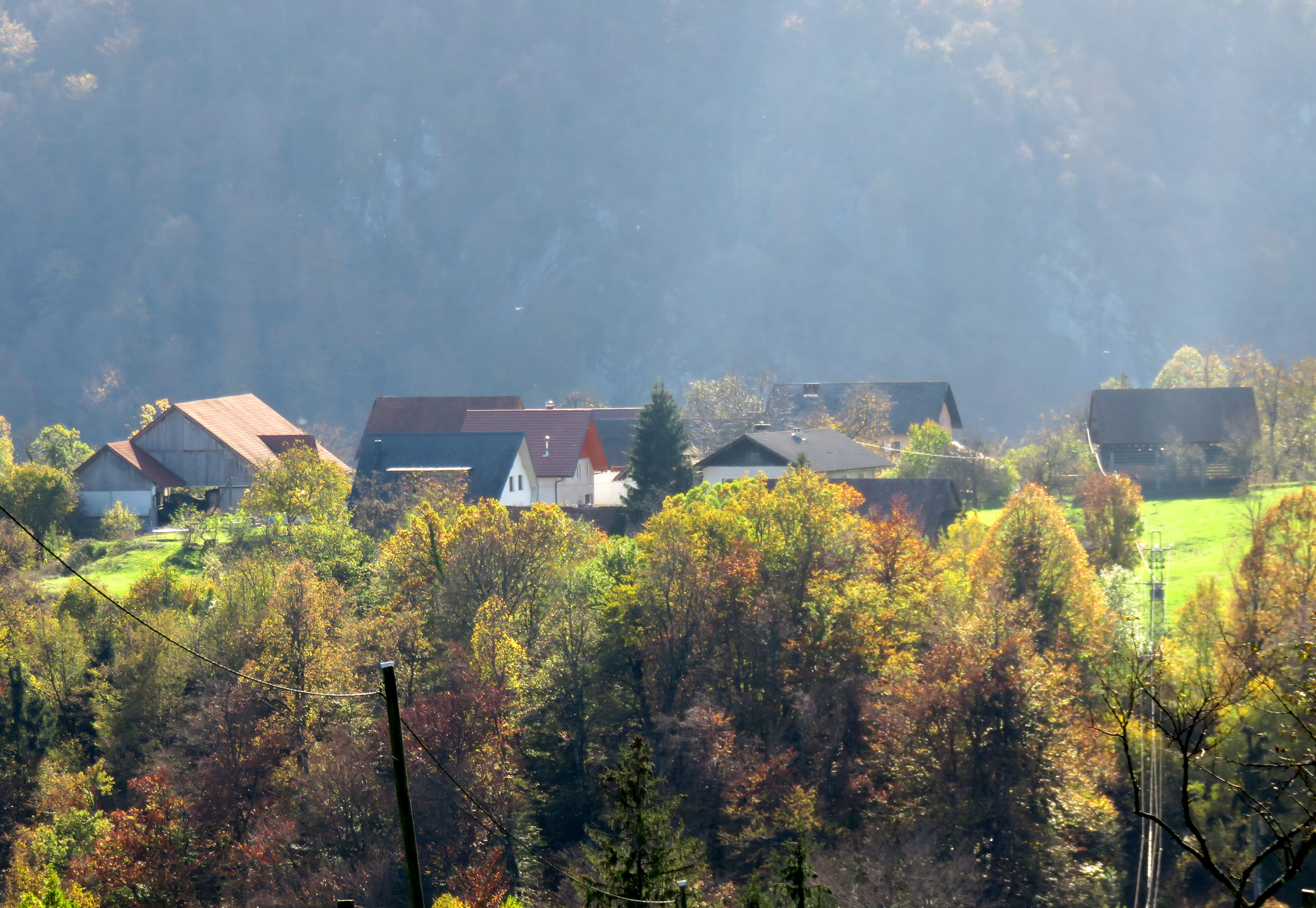

- Location in Slovenia
- Coordinates: 45°53′34.42″N 14°22′5.5″E
- Country: Slovenia
- Traditional region: Inner Carniola
- Statistical region: Central Slovenia
- Municipality: Borovnica

Area
  - Total: 1.06 km^{2} (0.41 sq mi)
- Elevation: 477.9 m (1,568 ft)

Population (2020)
  - Total: 15
  - Density: 14/km^{2} (37/sq mi)

Pristava (pronounced [pɾiˈstaːʋa]) is a small settlement in the hills south of Borovnica in the Inner Carniola region of Slovenia.
