= Zabočevo =

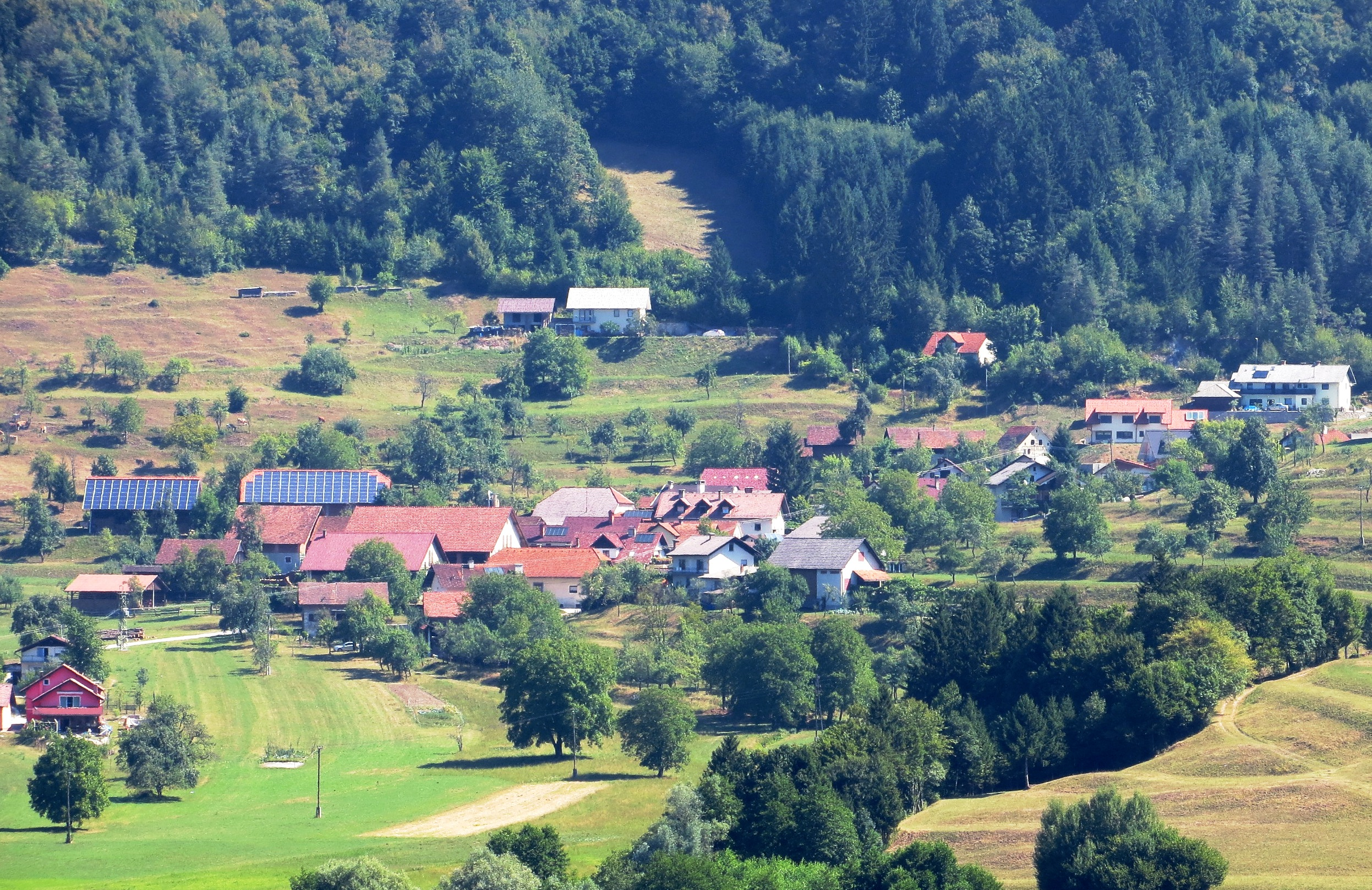

- Location in Slovenia
- Coordinates: 45°54′26.54″N 14°23′58.59″E
- Country: Slovenia
- Traditional region: Inner Carniola
- Statistical region: Central Slovenia
- Municipality: Borovnica

Area
  - Total: 6.57 km^{2} (2.54 sq mi)
- Elevation: 358.6 m (1,177 ft)

Population (2020)
  - Total: 114
  - Density: 17.4/km^{2} (44.9/sq mi)

Zabočevo (pronounced [zabɔˈtʃeːʋɔ]; occasionally Sabočevo or Sobočevo, German: Sobotschewo) is a village southeast of Borovnica in the Inner Carniola region of Slovenia.

== Name ==
The name Zabočevo is a now-standardized hypercorrection of the older name Sobočevo. It is derived from *sǫbočь (< so- + *bokъ), a compound meaning 'on the side'. The name therefore refers to a place on the flank or slope of a hill. In the past the German name was Sobotschewo.

== Church ==
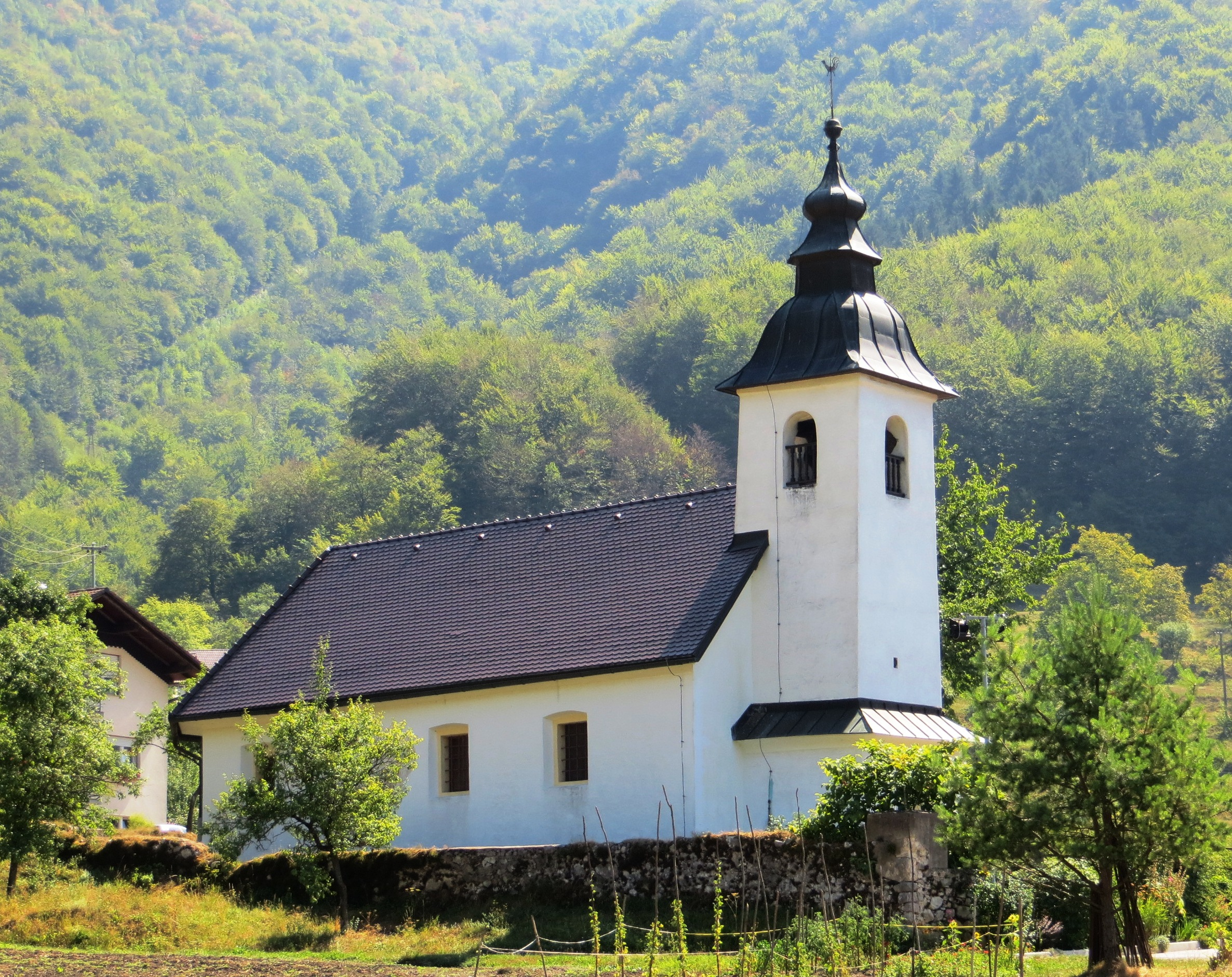
View from northwest

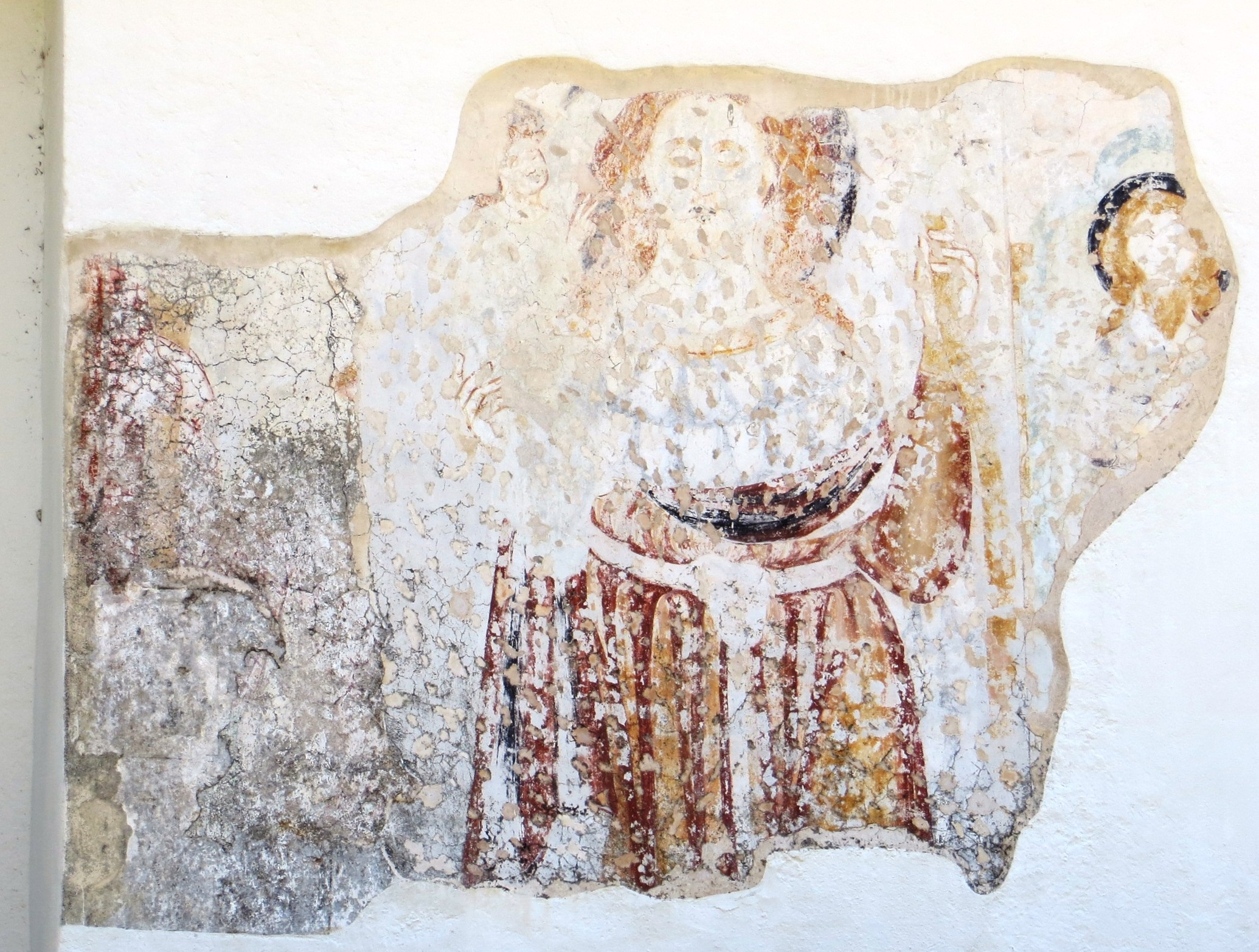
Fresco fragment

St. John the Baptist Church

The local church in the settlement is a chapel of ease dedicated to John the Baptist and belongs to the Parish of Borovnica. The church is built in a Gothic style and features a fragment of a fresco depicting Saint Christopher. The square bell tower was added to at the end of the 16th century. The interior of the church was remodeled in the first half of the 18th century. The church stands west of the village on a rise south of the road.
