= Brezovica pri Borovnici =

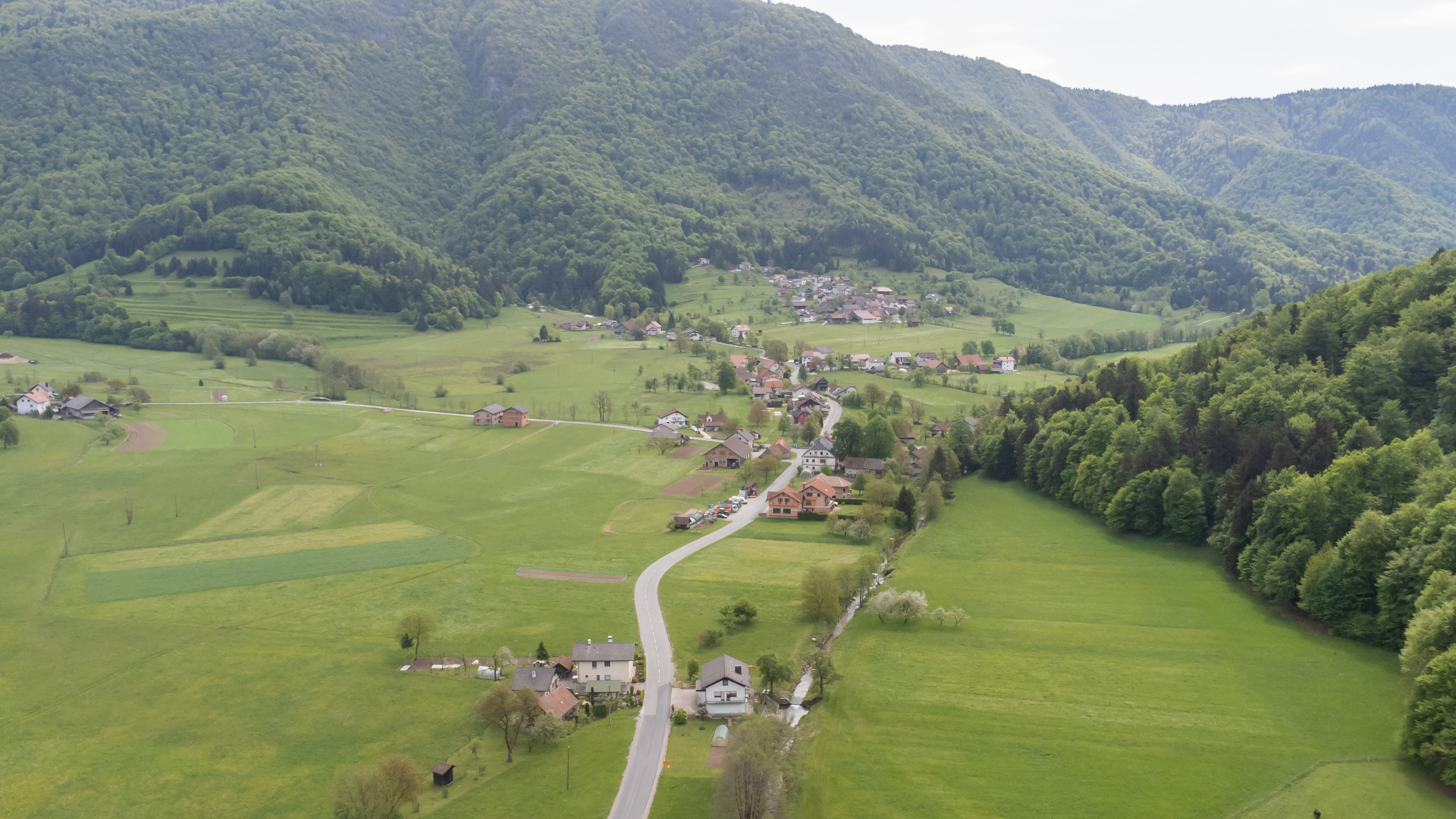

- Location in Slovenia
- Coordinates: 45°54′9.45″N 14°23′11.91″E
- Country: Slovenia
- Traditional region: Inner Carniola
- Statistical region: Central Slovenia
- Municipality: Borovnica

Area
  - Total: 11.37 km^{2} (4.39 sq mi)
- Elevation: 312.3 m (1,025 ft)

Population (2020)
  - Total: 222
  - Density: 19.5/km^{2} (50.6/sq mi)

Brezovica pri Borovnici (pronounced [ˈbɾéːzɔʋitsa pɾi bɔɾɔwˈnìːtsi]; German: Bresowitz) is a settlement south of Borovnica in the Inner Carniola region of Slovenia. The settlement includes the hamlets of Kapitov Grič, Prod, and Vrbljene.

== Geography ==
Brezovica is a clustered village at the southeast end of the Borovnica Valley. It lies along Prušnica Creek and its tributaries: Šumik Creek, which flows from below Krimšček Hill (941 m), and Izber Creek. The soil is sandy and partially loamy.

== Name ==
The name of the settlement was changed from Brezovica to Brezovica pri Borovnici (literally, 'Brezovica near Borovnica') in 1955. The name Brezovica and names like it are relatively common in Slovenia and in other Slavic countries (e.g., Březovice in the Czech Republic, Brezovica in Serbia, etc.). The name Brezovica is derived from the word breza 'birch'. Like similar toponyms in Slovenia (e.g., Brezova, Brezovec, Brezovci), it originally referred to the local vegetation. In the past the German name was Bresowitz.

== History ==
In 1884, Brezovica had a population of 180 people living in 29 houses. The population remained relatively stable for decades, with 173 people in 32 houses in 1900, and 181 people in 28 houses in 1961.

In 1942, the regional committee of the Communist Party of Slovenia took up positions in a bunker along Šumnik Creek north of Brezovica pri Borovnici. The bunker was attacked by Anti-Communist Volunteer Militia forces on December 14, 1942.

=== Mass grave ===
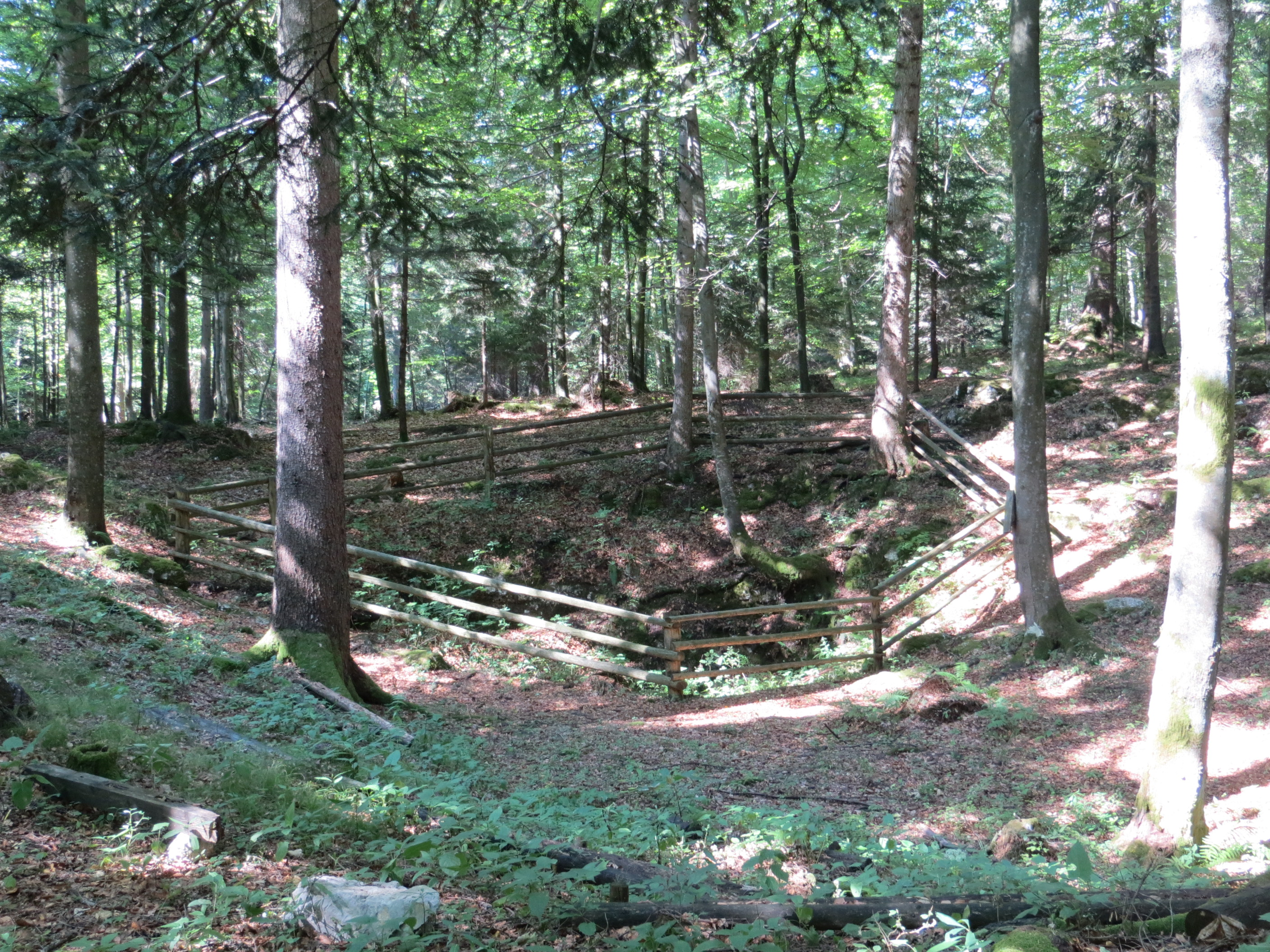
Cave perimeter

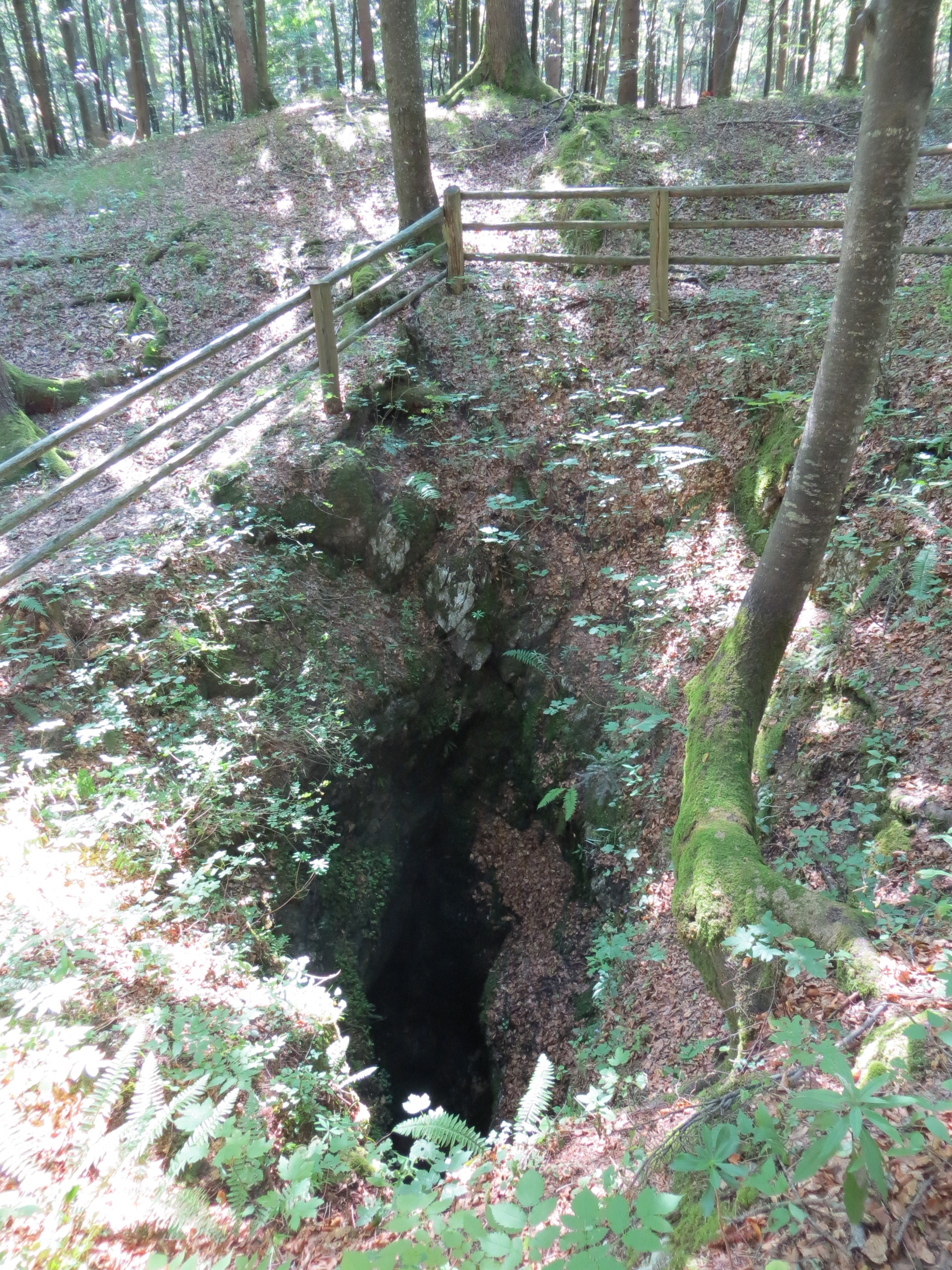
Cave mouth

Krim Cave Mass Grave

Brezovica pri Borovnici is the site of a mass grave associated with the Second World War. The Krim Cave Mass Grave (Slovene: Grobišče Krimska jama) lies in the woods south of the settlement. It contains the remains of an unknown number of Slovene civilians from neighboring villages murdered by a battalion of the Partisan Krim Detachment in 1942. Some sources estimate the number of victims to be around 300. The cave was used during the war by the Partisan Ljubo Šercer Battalion to dispose of other victims liquidated by the Partisans. It was investigated by Home Guard forces on 9 September 1942, and again with a journalist and a photographer on 23 March 1945, confirming the presence of human remains in the cave. After the war, the entrance to the cave was dynamited in 1947, and again in September 1948.

== Gallery ==
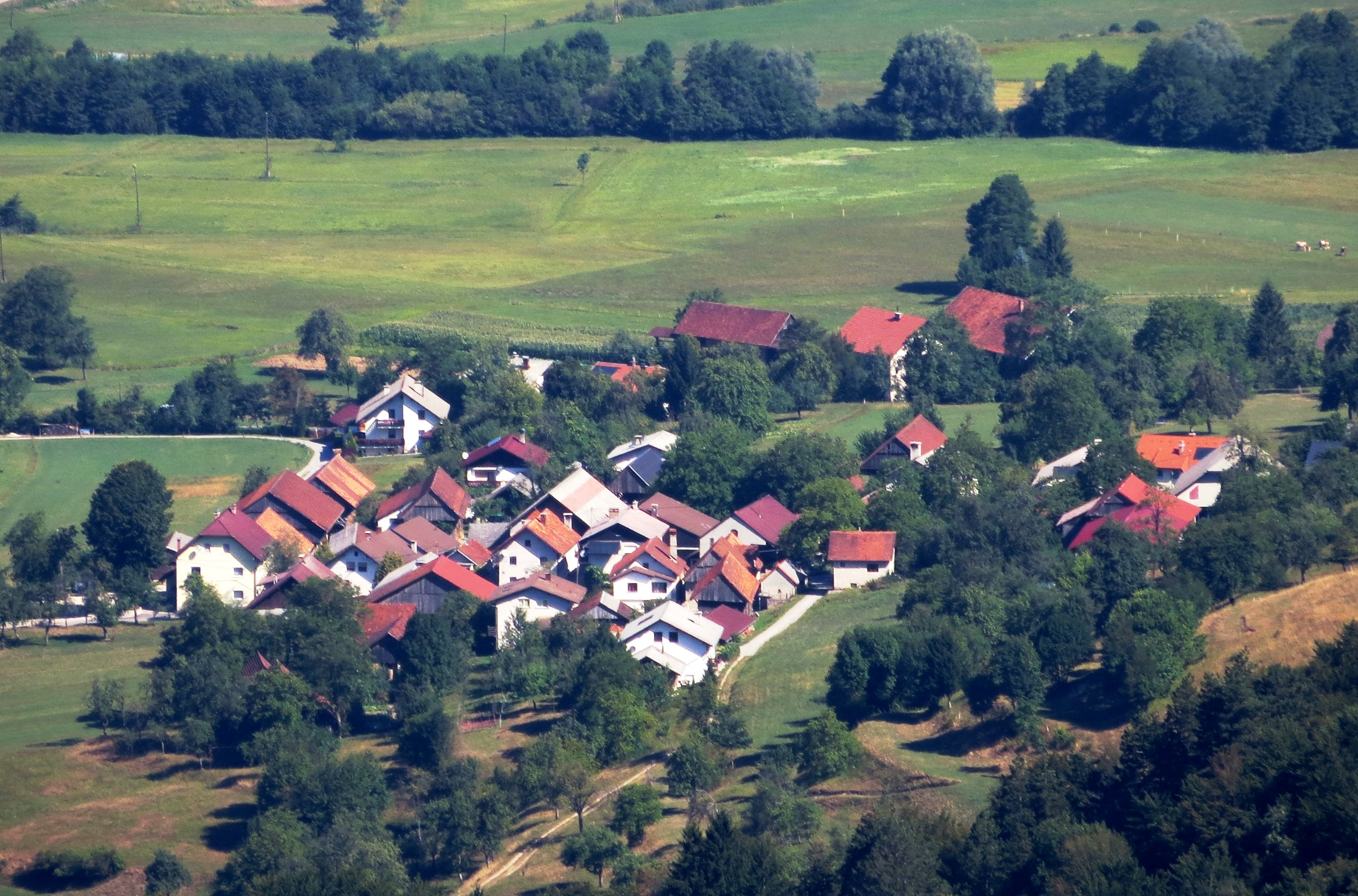
Main settlement and hamlet of Prod

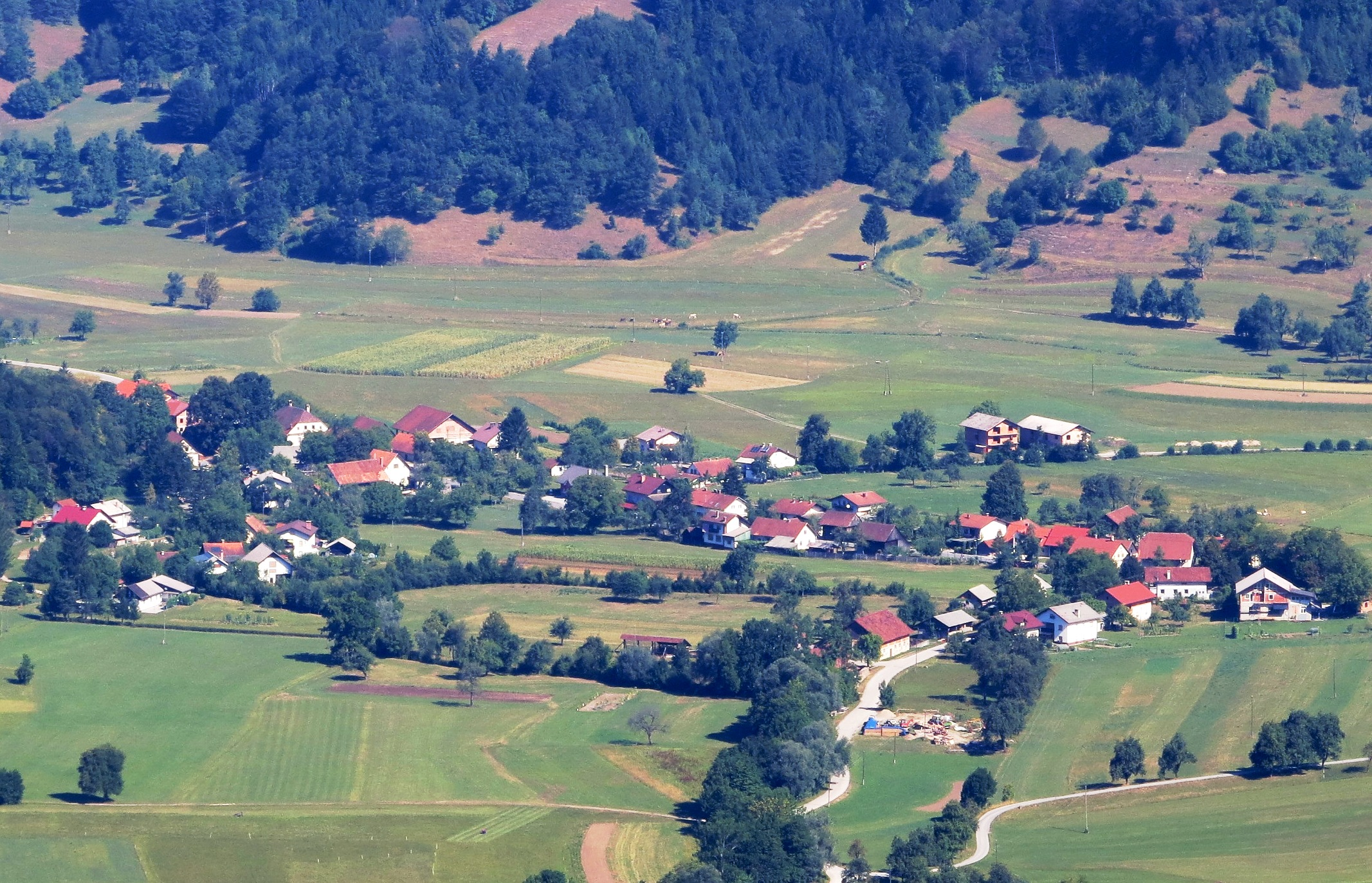
Hamlet of Vrbljene
