= Ohonica =

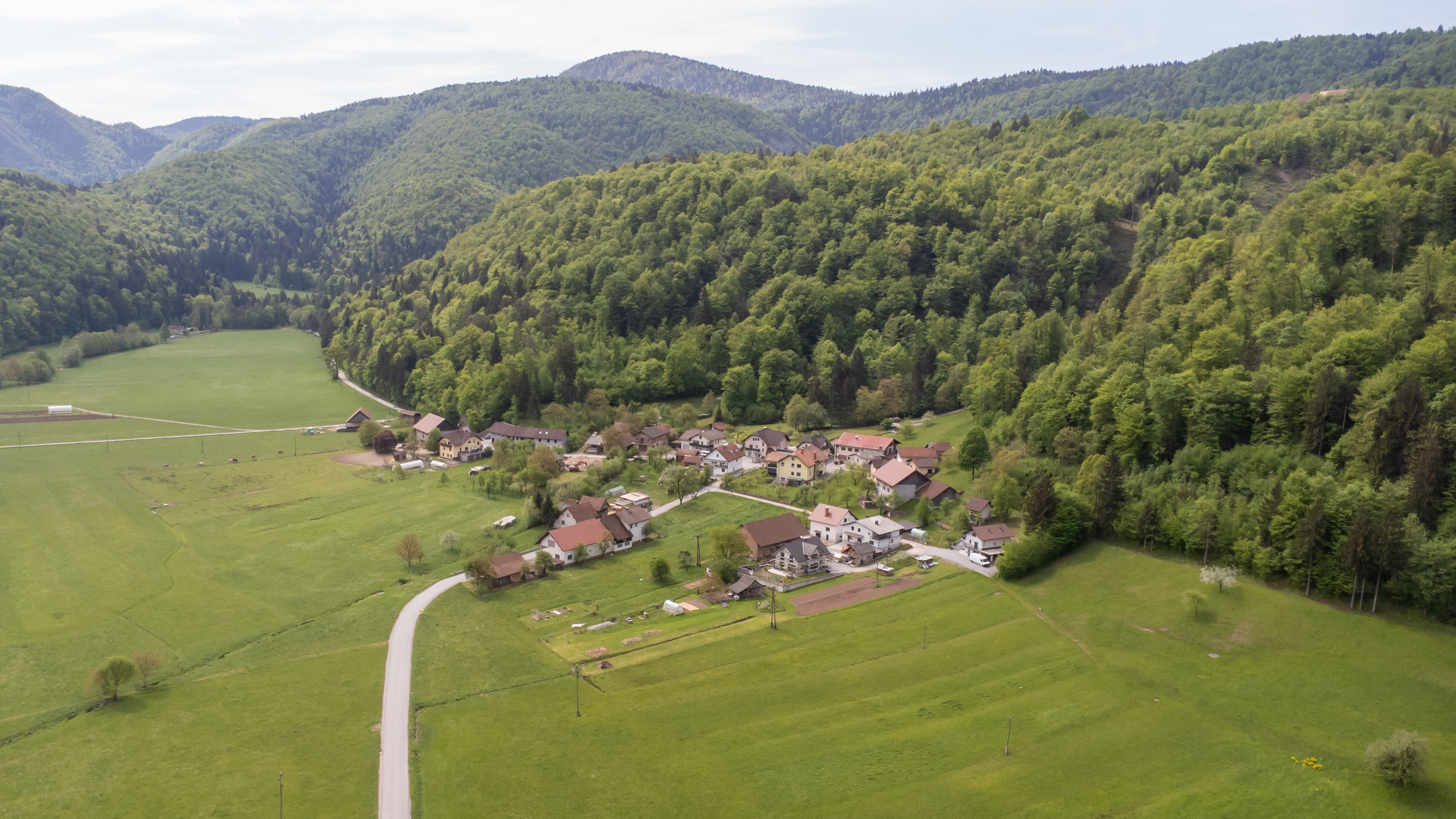

- Location in Slovenia
- Coordinates: 45°54′7.62″N 14°22′33.42″E
- Country: Slovenia
- Traditional region: Inner Carniola
- Statistical region: Central Slovenia
- Municipality: Borovnica

Area
  - Total: 1.13 km^{2} (0.44 sq mi)
- Elevation: 316 m (1,037 ft)

Population (2020)
  - Total: 92
  - Density: 81/km^{2} (210/sq mi)

Ohonica (pronounced [ɔxɔˈniːtsa]) is a small settlement in the Municipality of Borovnica in the Inner Carniola region of Slovenia.
