= Pako =

Village in Inner Carniola, Slovenia

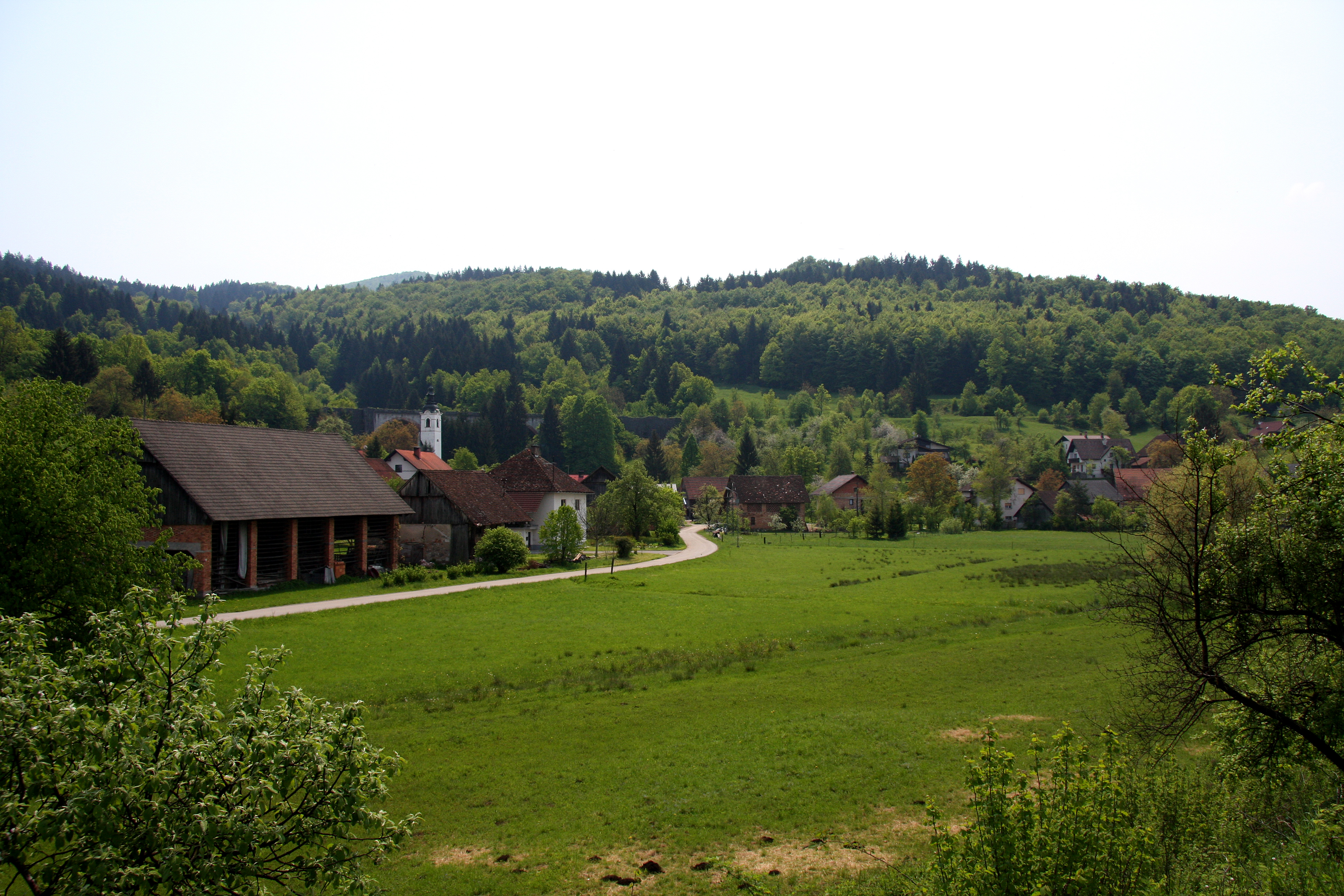

- Location in Slovenia
- Coordinates: 45°56′23.25″N 14°22′16.59″E
- Country: Slovenia
- Traditional region: Inner Carniola
- Statistical region: Central Slovenia
- Municipality: Borovnica

Area
  - Total: 2.5 km^{2} (0.97 sq mi)
- Elevation: 349 m (1,145 ft)

Population (2020)
  - Total: 167
  - Density: 67/km^{2} (170/sq mi)

Pako (pronounced [ˈpaːkɔ]; in older sources also Pekel) is a village north of Borovnica in the Inner Carniola region of Slovenia.

== Name ==
The origin of the name Pako is unknown. The settlement was attested in written sources in 1300 as Pach (and also as Pagk in 1439 and Pakh in 1496). The standardized spelling Pekel was also used.

== Church ==
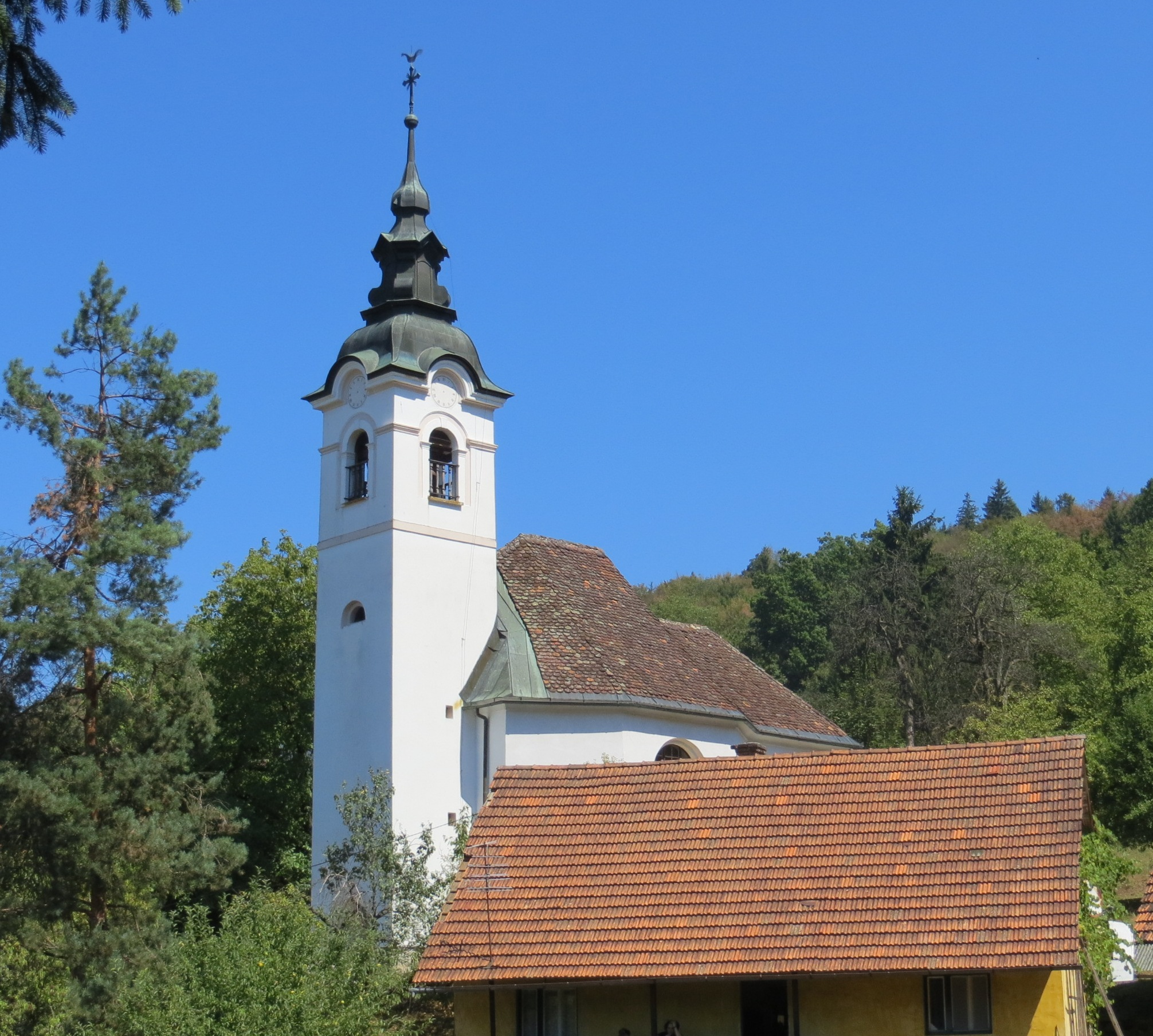
Saint Nicholas' Church

The local church in Pako is dedicated to Saint Nicholas and belongs to the Parish of Borovnica. A church at the site was first mentioned in written sources in 1526 and the current structure dates from 1717.
