= Municipality of Borovnica =

Municipality of Slovenia

Municipality of Borovnica Občina Borovnica
- Municipality
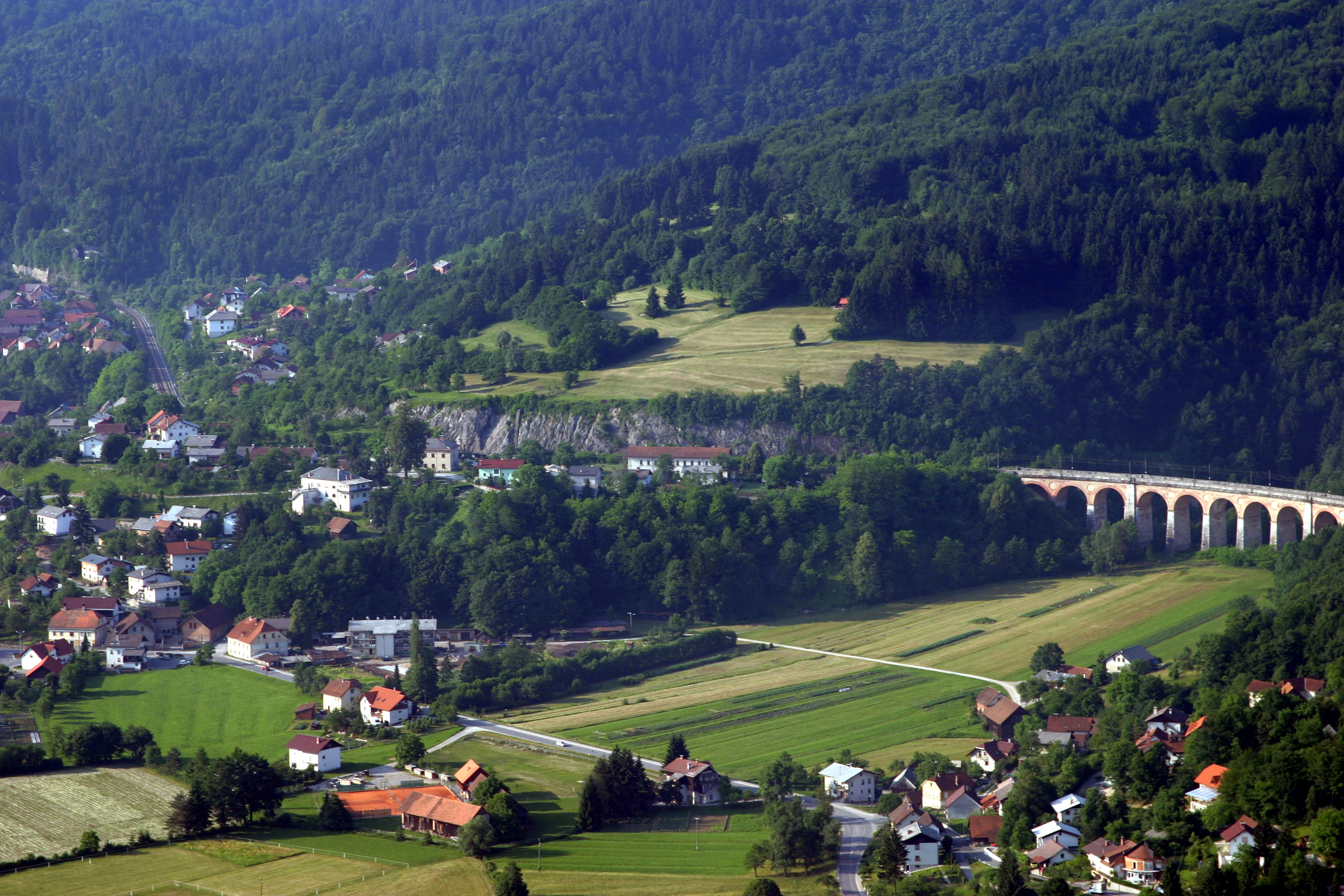

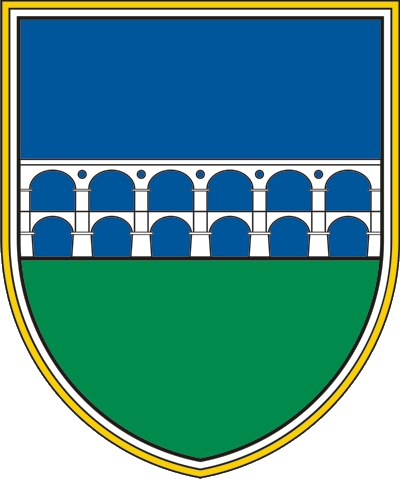
- Coat of arms

- Location of the Municipality of Borovnica in Slovenia
- Coordinates: 45°54′N 14°23′E
- Country: Slovenia

Government
  - Mayor: Peter Crnilogar (Independent)

Area
  - Total: 42.3 km^{2} (16.3 sq mi)
- Elevation: 428 m (1,404 ft)

Population (2002)
  - Total: 3,839
  - Density: 90.8/km^{2} (235/sq mi)
- Time zone: UTC+01 (CET)
  - Summer (DST): UTC+02 (CEST)
- Postal code: 1353
- Vehicle registration: LJ
- Website: www.borovnica.si
- Source: Statistical Office of the Republic of Slovenia, census of 2002.

The Municipality of Borovnica (Slovene: Občina Borovnica) is a municipality in the Inner Carniola region of Slovenia. The seat of the municipality is the settlement of Borovnica. The municipality is southwest of the national capital Ljubljana.

== History ==
In 2022, torrential rains caused locally extreme flooding in the Municipality of Borovnica.

== Settlements ==
In addition to the municipal seat of Borovnica, the municipality also includes the following settlements:

- Breg pri Borovnici
- Brezovica pri Borovnici
- Dol pri Borovnici
- Dražica
- Lašče
- Laze pri Borovnici
- Niževec
- Ohonica
- Pako
- Pristava
- Zabočevo
