= Pavla Jerina Lah =

Slovene surgeon and partisan (1915–2007)

- Born: 17 February 1915; Borovnica, Austria–Hungary
- Died: 12 November 2007 (aged 92); Črni Vrh, Idrija, Slovenia
- Education: Faculty of Medicine in Ljubljana; University of Ljubljana
- Occupations: Slovene surgeon and partisan
- Employer(s): Slovenian Military Partisan Hospital Pavla; Institute of Transfusion of Serbia
- Organization: Slovene Partisans
- Awards: Commemorative Medal of the Partisans of 1941; Order of Freedom of the Republic of Slovenia

Pavla Jerina Lah (17 February 1915 – 12 November 2007) was a Slovene surgeon and partisan. During World War II, a clandestine Slovenian Military Partisan Hospital was named after Lah, where she secretly treated activists. After the war, she completed a surgical specialism, worked as director of the Institute of Transfusion of Serbia and served as chair of the Faculty Council of the Faculty of Medicine in Ljubljana.

== Biography ==
Lah was born on 17 February 1915 in Borovnica, Austria–Hungary.

Lah enrolled in the Faculty of Medicine in Ljubljana, then studied at the University of Ljubljana, graduating in 1940. After completing her compulsory internship, Lah volunteered at the Surgical Department of the Hospital in Ljubljana.

Lah joined the Slovene Partisans in 1943, part of the anti-Nazi resistance movement to the German occupation of the Slovenian lands during World War II. She collected medicines and medical supplies and secretly treated activists. When partisan Alojzija Kralja died at the General Hospital in Ljubljana, Lah recognised him and arranged for his burial in Žale.

In September 1943, Lah and female fellow doctor Franja Bojc Bidovec [sl] were captured by Nazi German soldiers, but they both managed to escape from the transport from Trieste to Ljubljana two months later and Lah re-joined the partisans in Primorska.

The clandestine Slovenian Military Partisan Hospital Pavla [sl] was established in 1943 deep in the forest of the Trnovo Forest Plateau after the capitulation of Italy. It was named after Lah, who served as the director of the hospital from 1944 until the end of the war in Europe. In August 1944, Lah transferred 50 seriously wounded patients from Primorska to Notranjska so that they could be flown to a hospital in Bari, Apulia, Italy. Over 1000 people were treated at the hospital before liberation by the 114 staff members, including both Partisan and Allied troops and civilians.

After World War II, Lah completed her surgical specialism, passing examinations in Belgrade in 1948. From 1951, Lah served as director of the Institute of Transfusion of Serbia, and organised blood donation across Slovenia and Yugoslavia. She was a member of the International Society of Transfusionists. She retired in 1969, then served as chair of the Faculty Council of the Faculty of Medicine in Ljubljana.

== Death and legacy ==
Lah died on 12 November 2007 in Črni Vrh, Idrija, Slovenia, aged 92.

Lah's medical records, disease inventories, operation protocols and photographs are held in the Franja Partisan Hospital Collection in Slovenia.

In 2010, The Health Center in Idrija, Slovenia, unveiled a bust of Lah during a ceremonial event organized by the Association of War Invalids of the North Primorje Region, the Municipality of Idrija and the Association of Associations of Fighters for the Values of the National Liberation War, the Idrija-Cerkno Regional Committee. The event was attended by her two sons.

== Awards ==
- Commemorative Medal of the Partisans of 1941
- Order of Freedom of the Republic of Slovenia
