= Dolenje Otave =

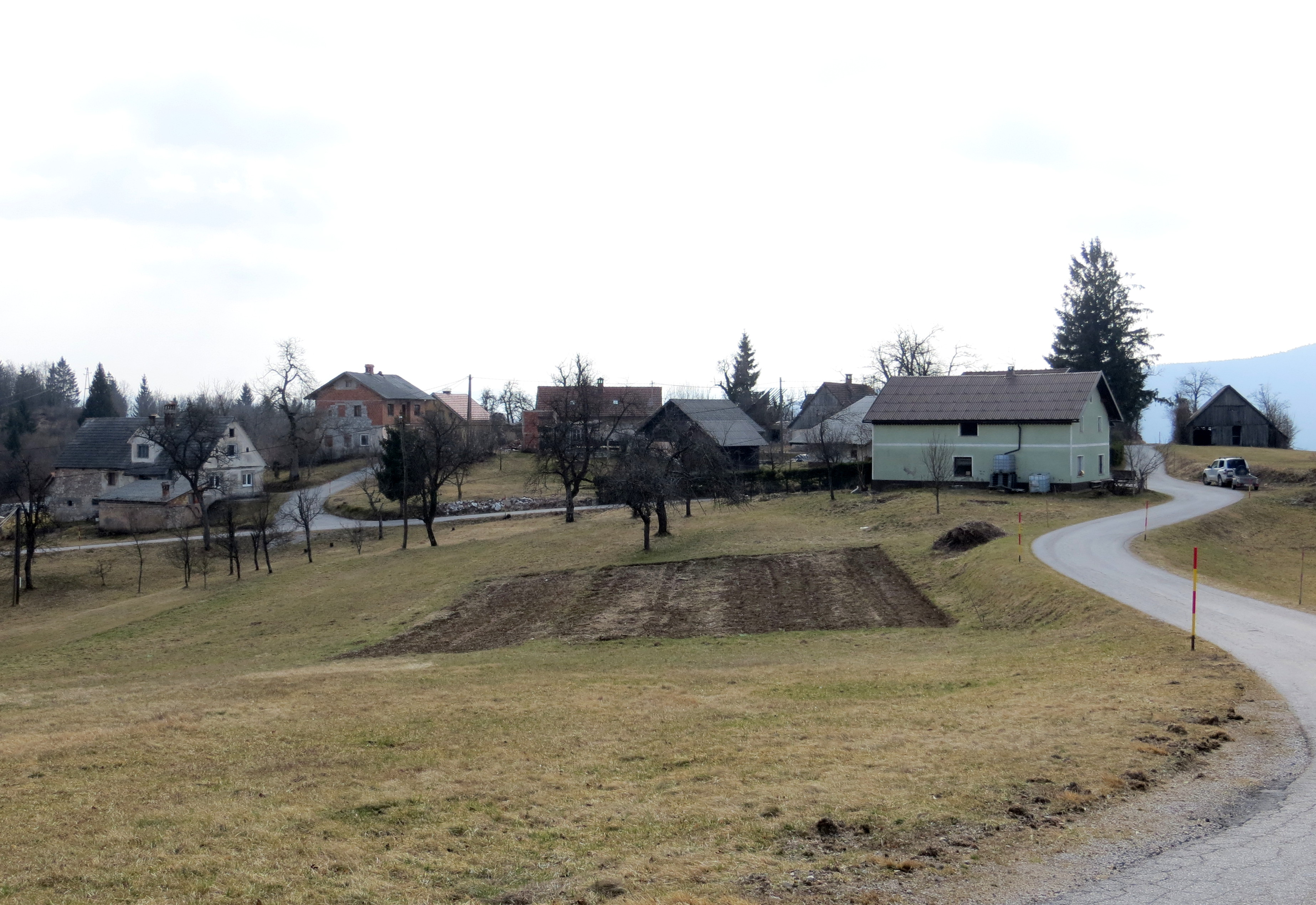

- Location in Slovenia
- Coordinates: 45°50′13.56″N 14°24′57.43″E
- Country: Slovenia
- Traditional region: Inner Carniola
- Statistical region: Littoral–Inner Carniola
- Municipality: Cerknica

Area
  - Total: 2.04 km^{2} (0.79 sq mi)
- Elevation: 793 m (2,602 ft)

Population (2020)
  - Total: 31
  - Density: 15/km^{2} (39/sq mi)

Dolenje Otave (pronounced [dɔˈleːnjɛ ɔˈtaːʋɛ]; German: Unterotawe) is a small village in the hills northeast of Begunje in the Municipality of Cerknica in the Inner Carniola region of Slovenia.

== Name ==
The name Dolenje Otave literally means 'lower Otave', contrasting with the name of neighboring Gorenje Otave (literally, 'upper Otave'). The name is probably derived from the Slovene common noun otava 'second crop (of hay)', referring to a meadow or area where hay could be harvested twice during the summer.
