= Laze pri Borovnici =

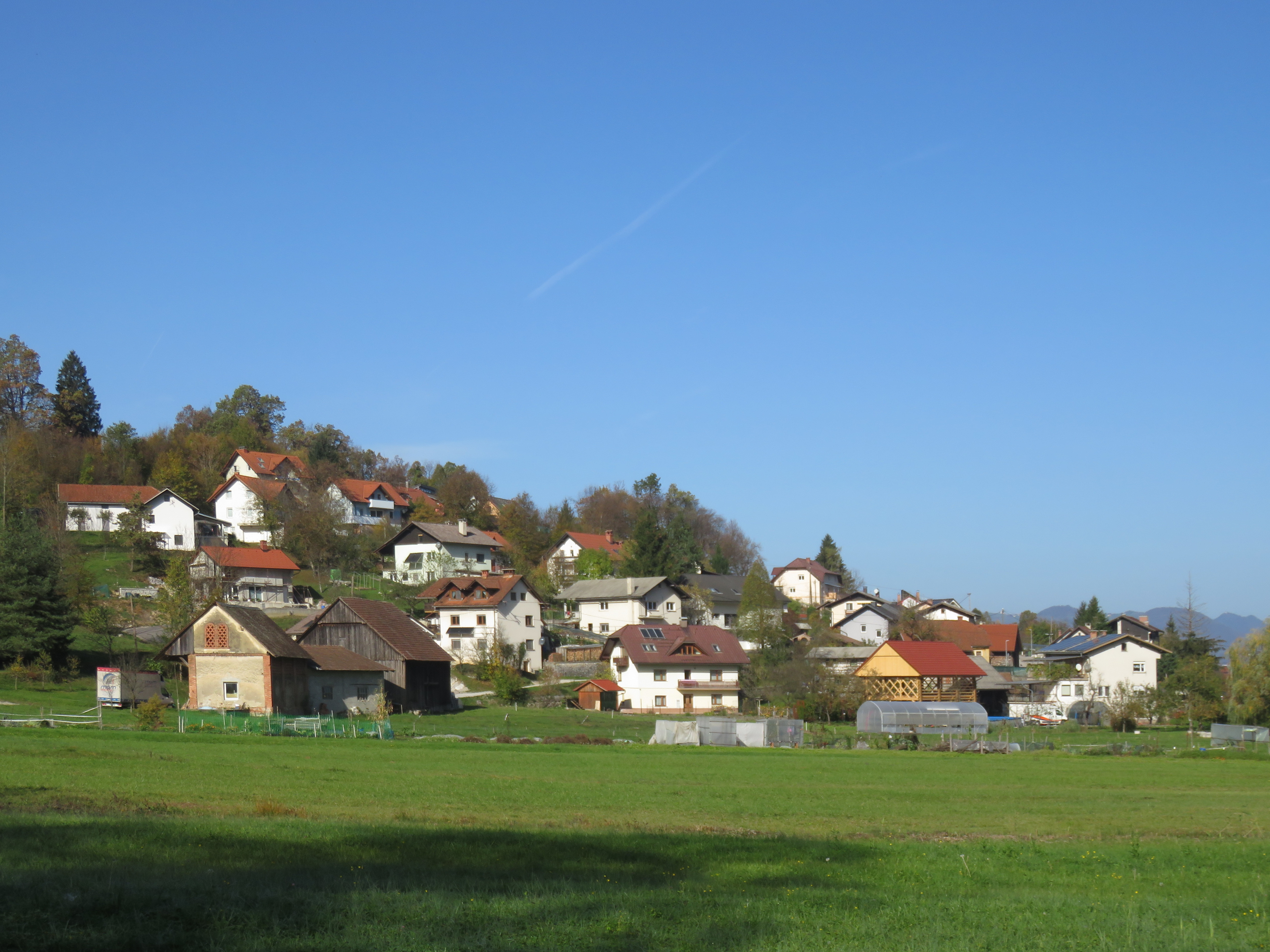

- Location in Slovenia
- Coordinates: 45°55′20.66″N 14°21′6.28″E
- Country: Slovenia
- Traditional region: Inner Carniola
- Statistical region: Central Slovenia
- Municipality: Borovnica

Area
  - Total: 1.58 km^{2} (0.61 sq mi)
- Elevation: 380.1 m (1,247 ft)

Population (2020)
  - Total: 267

Laze pri Borovnici (pronounced [ˈláːzɛ pɾi bɔɾɔwˈnìːtsi]) is a settlement west of Borovnica in the Inner Carniola region of Slovenia.

== Name ==
The name of the settlement was changed from Laze to Laze pri Borovnici in 1953.
