= Dol pri Borovnici =

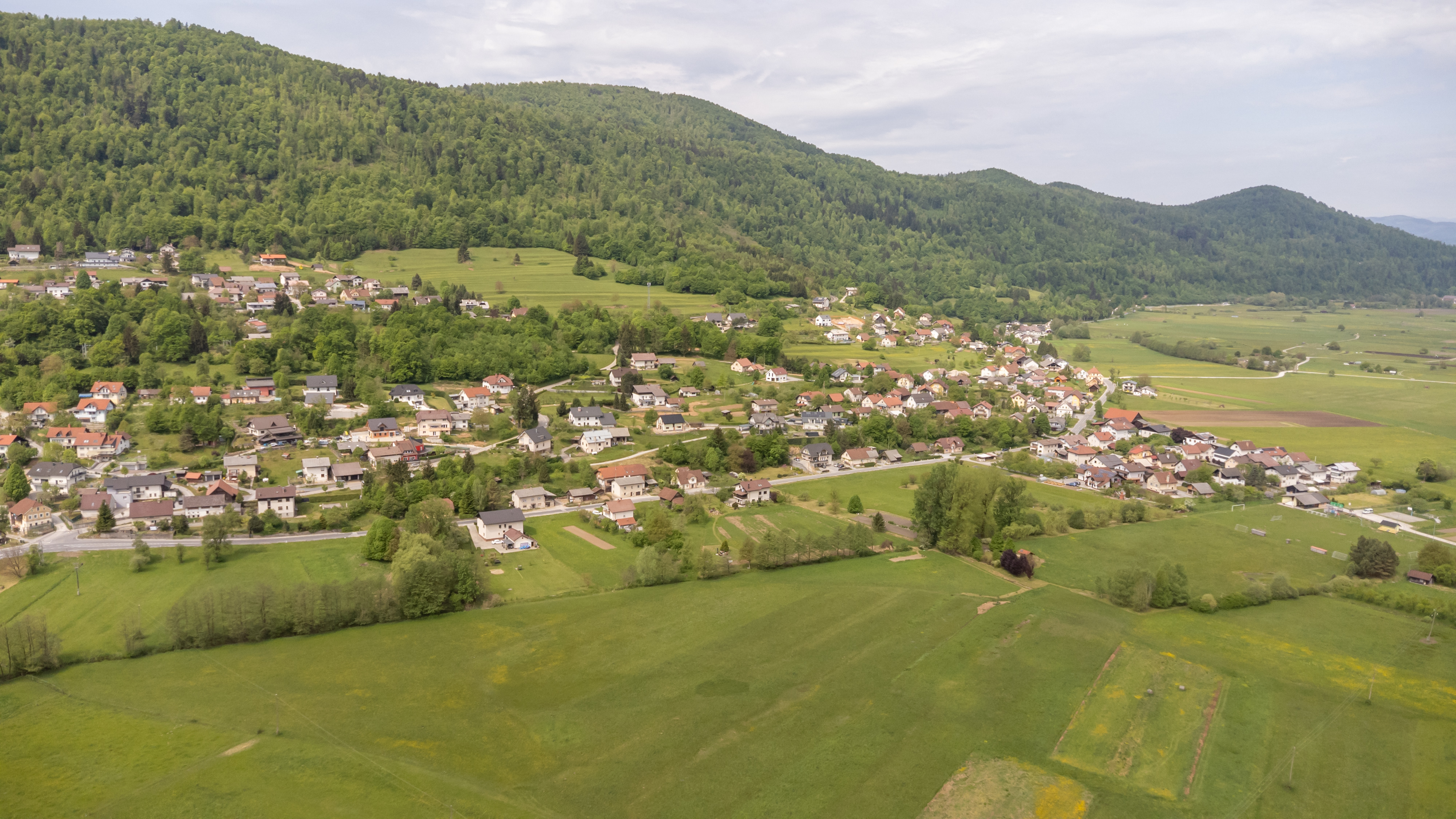

- Location in Slovenia
- Coordinates: 45°55′46.28″N 14°21′11.55″E
- Country: Slovenia
- Traditional region: Inner Carniola
- Statistical region: Central Slovenia
- Municipality: Borovnica

Area
  - Total: 6.09 km^{2} (2.35 sq mi)
- Elevation: 291.6 m (957 ft)

Population (2020)
  - Total: 517
  - Density: 84.9/km^{2} (220/sq mi)

Dol pri Borovnici (pronounced [ˈdóːl pɾi bɔɾɔwˈnìːtsi, ˈdóːw -]; in older sources also Dole) is a settlement north of Borovnica in the Inner Carniola region of Slovenia. It extends from the right bank of the Ljubljanica River to the outskirts of Borovnica.

== Name ==
The name of the settlement was changed from Dol to Dol pri Borovnici in 1953.
