= Borovnica Viaduct =

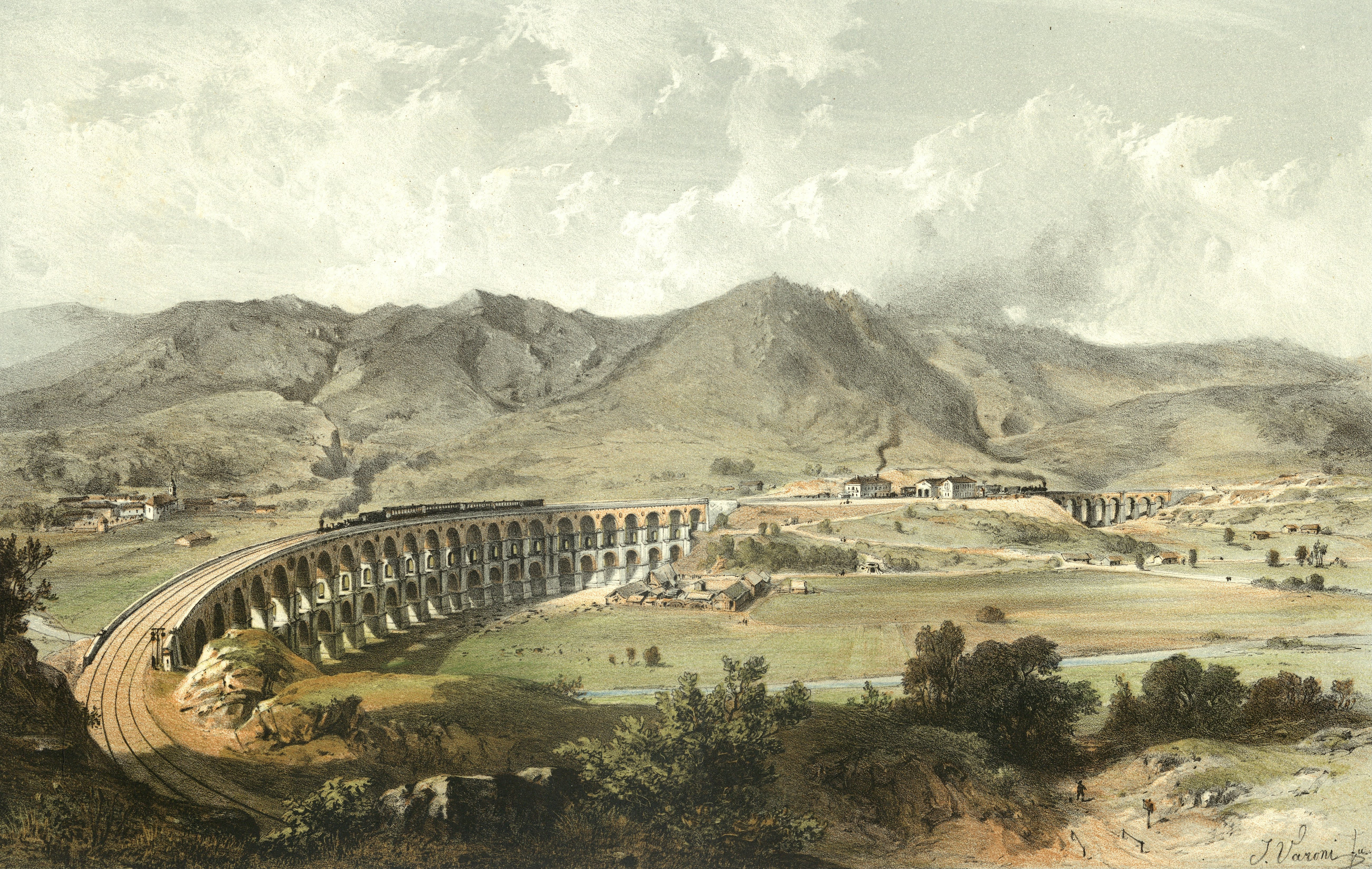
- An 1857 lithograph depiction of the viaduct
- Coordinates: 45.919297°N 14.364654°E
- Crosses: Borovnica Valley
- Locale: Slovenia

Characteristics
- Material: Brick
- Total length: 561 m (1,841 ft)
- Height: 38 m (125 ft)

History
- Designer: Carl Ritter von Ghega
- Construction start: 1850
- Construction end: 1856
- Closed: 1947

Location
- Interactive map of Borovnica Viaduct

The Borovnica Viaduct (Slovene: Borovniški viadukt, German: Franzdorfer Viadukt) is a former railroad viaduct in Borovnica, Slovenia.

== History ==
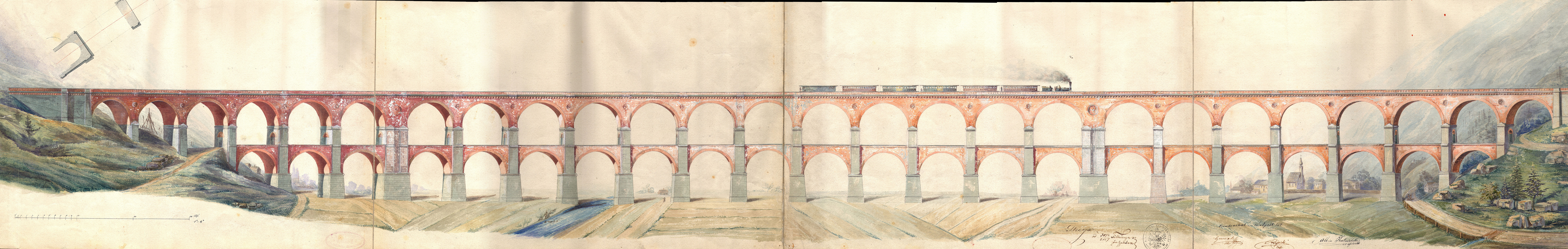
The viaduct - original plan

The viaduct was completed in 1856 and spanned the Borovnica Valley along the route from Vienna to Trieste vie Ljubljana. During its construction and for some decades afterward it was the largest stone bridge in Europe. It was 561 meters (1,841 ft) long and 38 meters (125 ft) high. The structure was planned by Carl Ritter von Ghega and construction began in 1850, lasting until August 1856, when the first train crossed it. It was a two-story structure; the first story consisted of 22 arches, and the second story had 25 arches. It was supported by 24 columns built of dressed stone that stood on wooden pilings driven into the loamy marsh soil. The arches were built of brick. The construction required 1,000,000 cubic feet (28,000 m^{3}) of broken stone, five million bricks, and 1,000,000 cubic feet (28,000 m^{3}) of stone blocks.

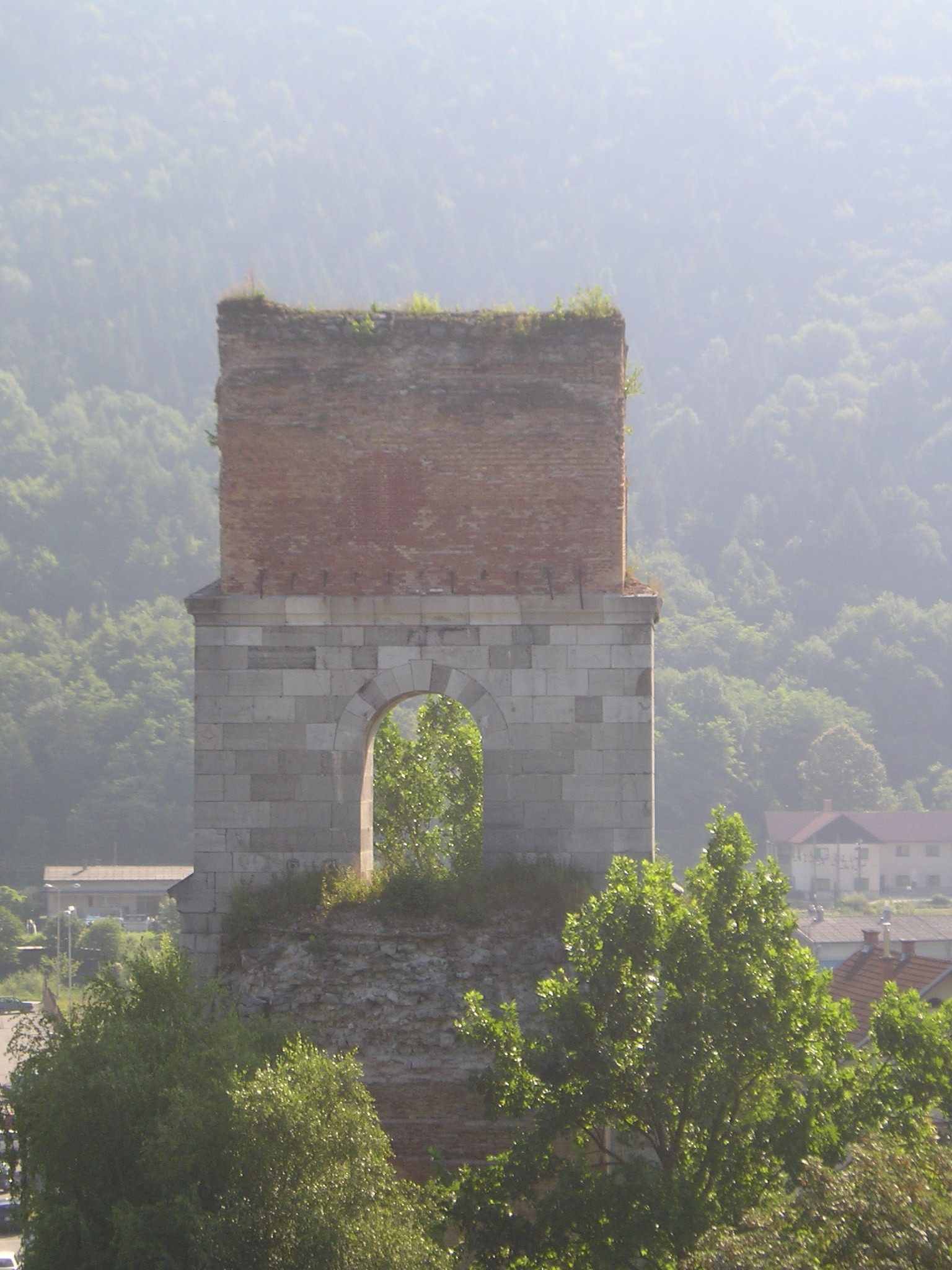
The remains of the railroad viaduct

The viaduct was in poor condition before the Second World War. Water had seeped into the viaduct for decades, weakening the bricks, and the oak pilings that supported it were beginning to rot, with the result that the entire structure was gradually settling. Trains crossing it had to slow down to 5 kilometers per hour (3.1 mph). At the beginning of the Second World War in Yugoslavia, the withdrawing Yugoslav Army blew up part of the bridge; Italian forces replaced the missing part of the viaduct with an iron structure. After the Italians withdrew, German forces built a bypass route past the viaduct because of the danger posed by increasingly frequent aerial attacks. After the last major Allied aerial attack on September 26, 1944, the partially destroyed viaduct was not repaired. The railroad was rerouted to the edge of the Borovnica Valley in 1947, which is where it also runs today. The remaining part of the viaduct was gradually dismantled by 1950. Today only a single column of the viaduct remains, standing in the middle of Borovnica.
