= Gorenje Otave =

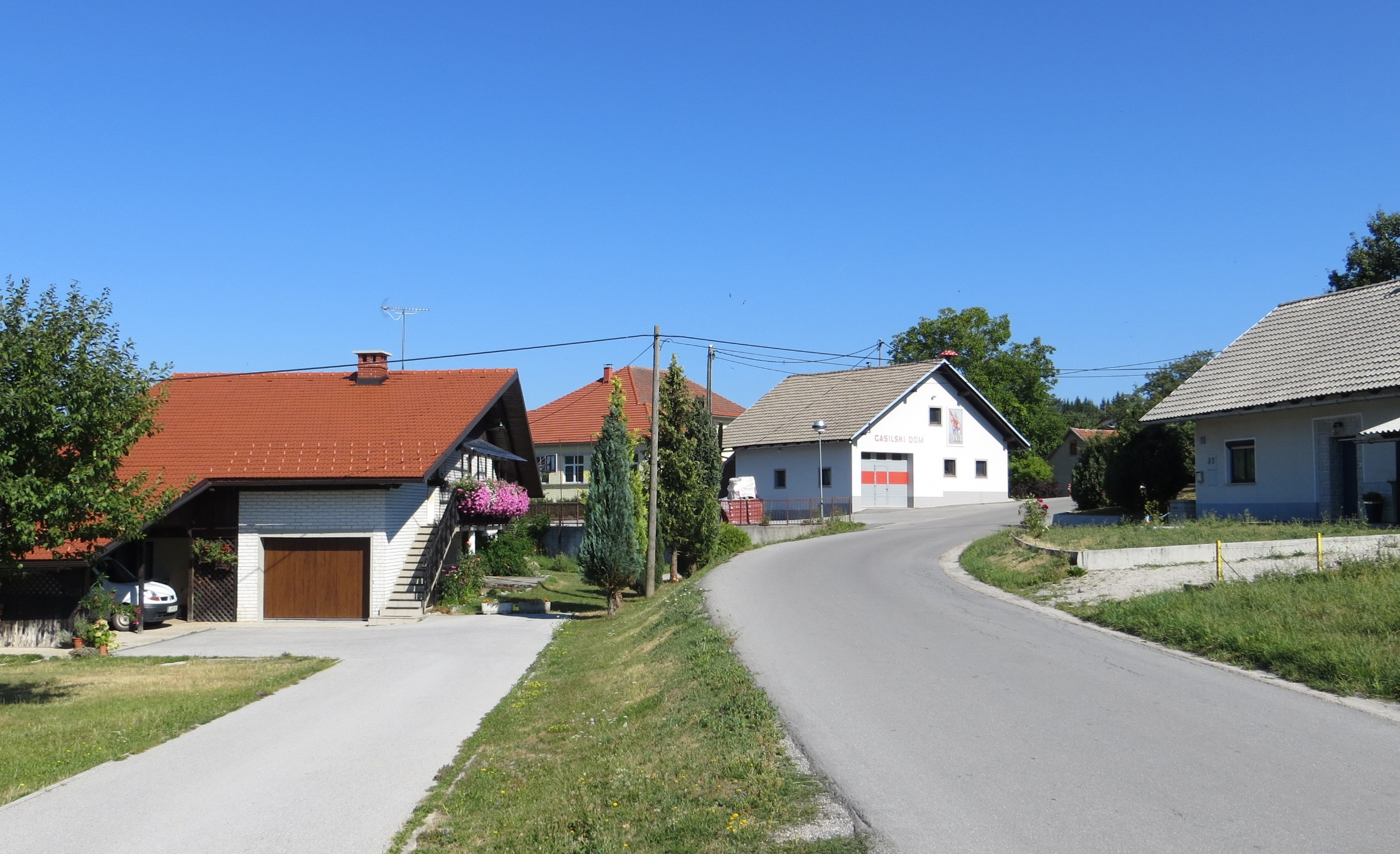

- Location in Slovenia
- Coordinates: 45°50′51.13″N 14°25′3.01″E
- Country: Slovenia
- Traditional region: Inner Carniola
- Statistical region: Littoral–Inner Carniola
- Municipality: Cerknica

Area
  - Total: 1.38 km^{2} (0.53 sq mi)
- Elevation: 829 m (2,720 ft)

Population (2020)
  - Total: 44
  - Density: 32/km^{2} (83/sq mi)

Gorenje Otave (pronounced [ɡɔˈɾeːnjɛ ɔˈtaːʋɛ]; German: Oberotawe) is a village in the hills northeast of Begunje in the Municipality of Cerknica in the Inner Carniola region of Slovenia.

== Name ==
Gorenje Otave was attested as Sand Andre in 1499, in reference to Saint Andrew's Church in the village. The name Gorenje Otave literally means 'upper Otave', contrasting with the name of neighboring Dolenje Otave (literally, 'lower Otave'). The name is probably derived from the Slovene common noun otava 'second crop (of hay)', referring to a meadow or area where hay could be harvested twice during the summer.

== History ==
An agricultural co-op building was built in Gorenje Otave in 1926, used by the villages to store farm equipment. During the Second World War, Italian forces shot 22 hostages in the village on 24 July 1942.

== Church ==
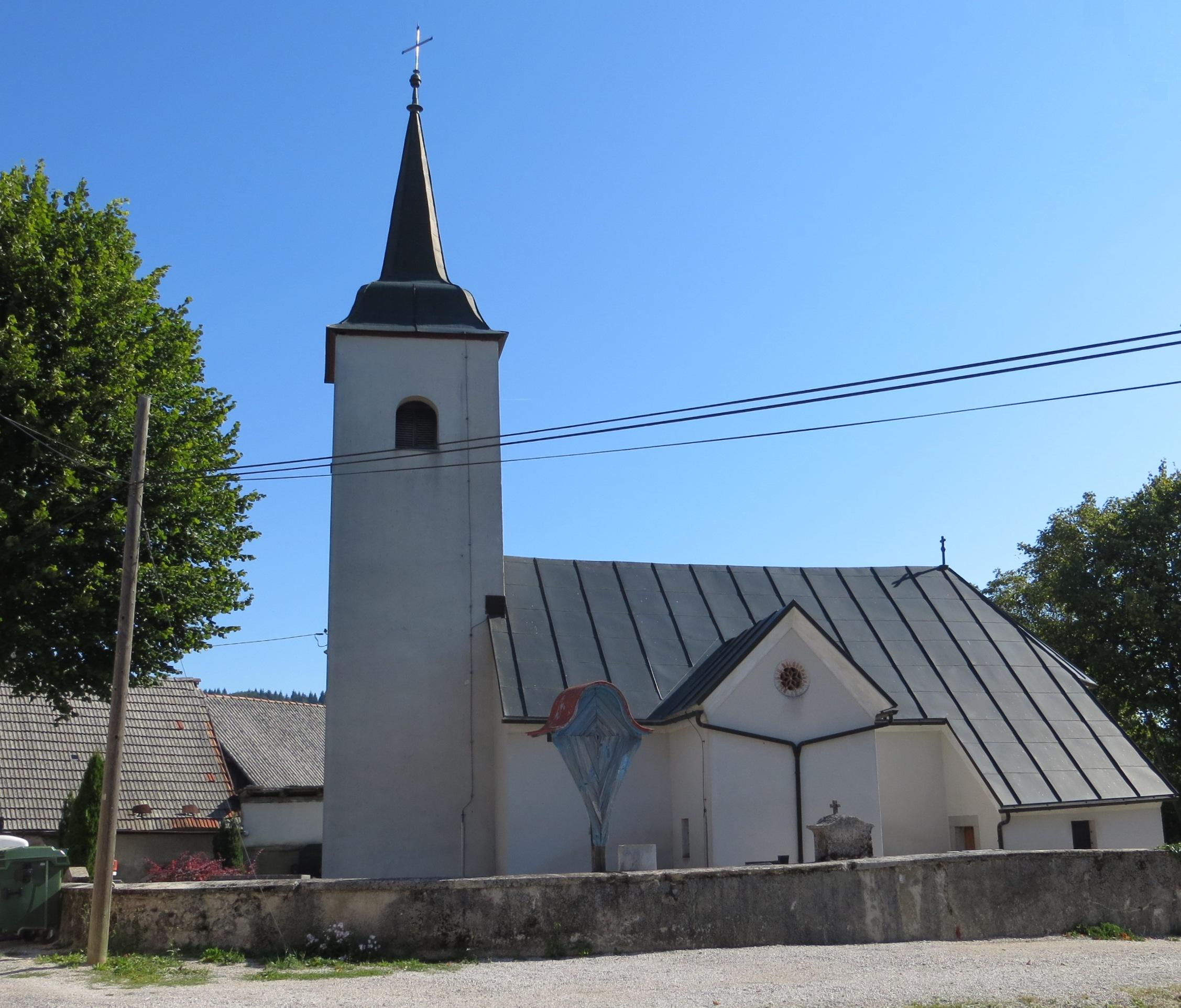
Saint Andrew's Church

The local church in the settlement is dedicated to Saint Andrew and belongs to the Parish of Sveti Vid. Stylistically it reflects 13th-century architecture; according to the parish chronicle, it was built in the 16th century.
