= Borovnica, Borovnica =

Borovnica
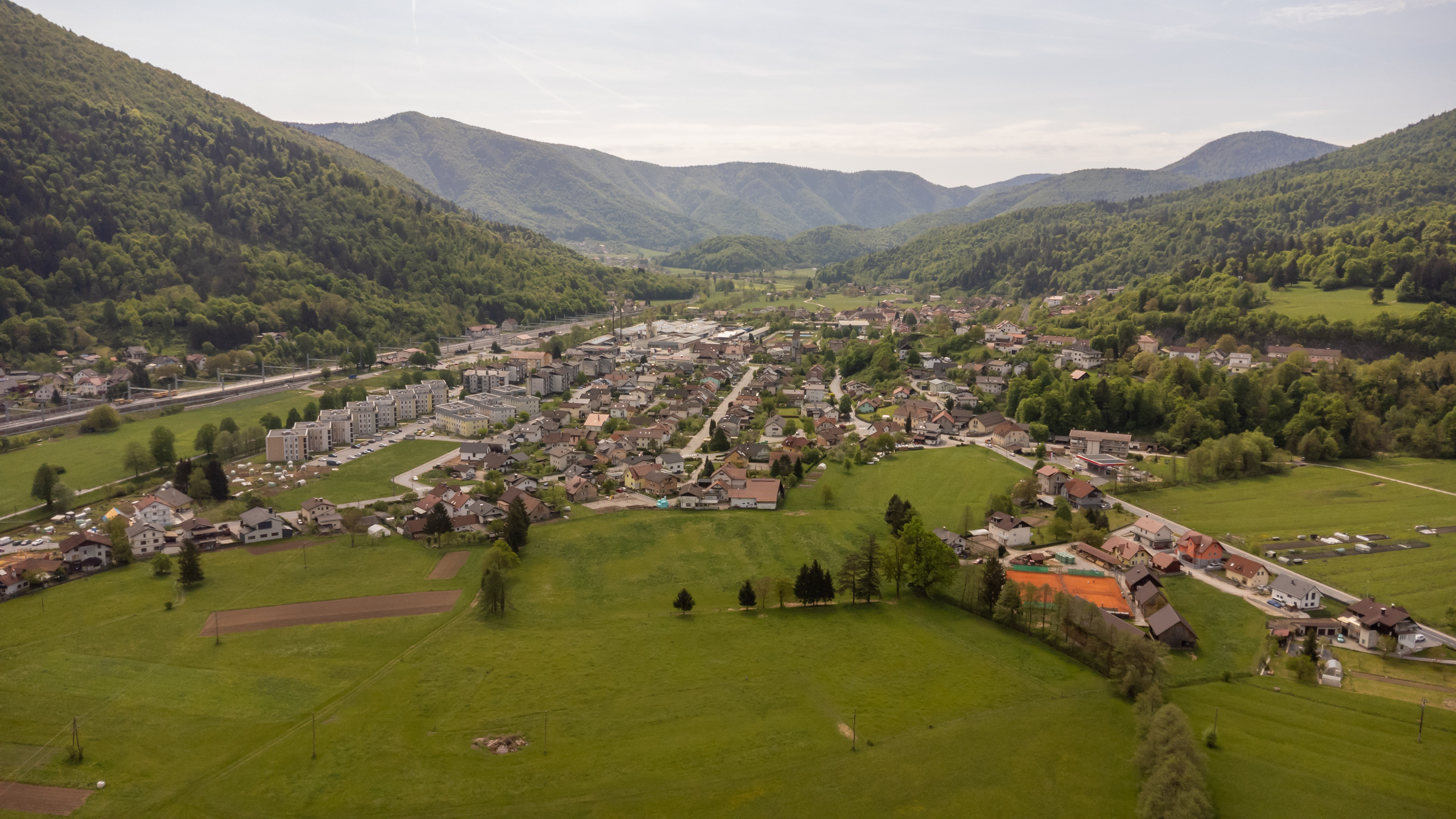

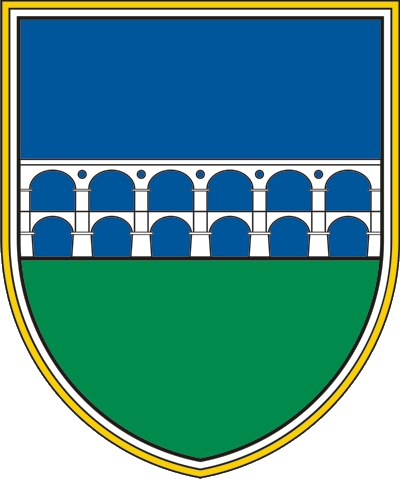
- Seal

- Location in Slovenia
- Coordinates: 45°55′4.72″N 14°21′51.02″E
- Country: Slovenia
- Traditional region: Inner Carniola
- Statistical region: Central Slovenia
- Municipality: Borovnica

Government
  - Mayor: Peter Crnilogar (Independent)

Area
  - Total: 0.96 km^{2} (0.37 sq mi)
- Elevation: 298.6 m (980 ft)

Population (2020)
  - Total: 2,674
  - Density: 2,800/km^{2} (7,200/sq mi)
- Time zone: UTC+01 (CET)
  - Summer (DST): UTC+02 (CEST)
- Postal code: 1353
- Website: https://www.borovnica.si/

Borovnica (pronounced [bɔɾɔwˈnìːtsa]; German: Franzdorf) is a settlement in the Municipality of Borovnica in the Inner Carniola region of Slovenia. It is about 20 kilometres (12 mi) southwest of the national capital Ljubljana.

== Name ==
Borovnica was attested in written sources in 1260 as Vronitz (and as Vreuncz in 1300, apud Vraniciam in 1313, and Vraunitz in 1366). In the local dialect, the settlement is known as Barounica. The name is a univerbation of *Borovna (vas/voda), literally 'pine village' or 'pine creek'. The name therefore originally refers to a place or stream where pines grow. The early German name Vronitz (which was later transformed into Franzdorf) is adapted from the Slovene name by shifting the stress to the first syllable and loss of the syllable -ov-.

== History ==
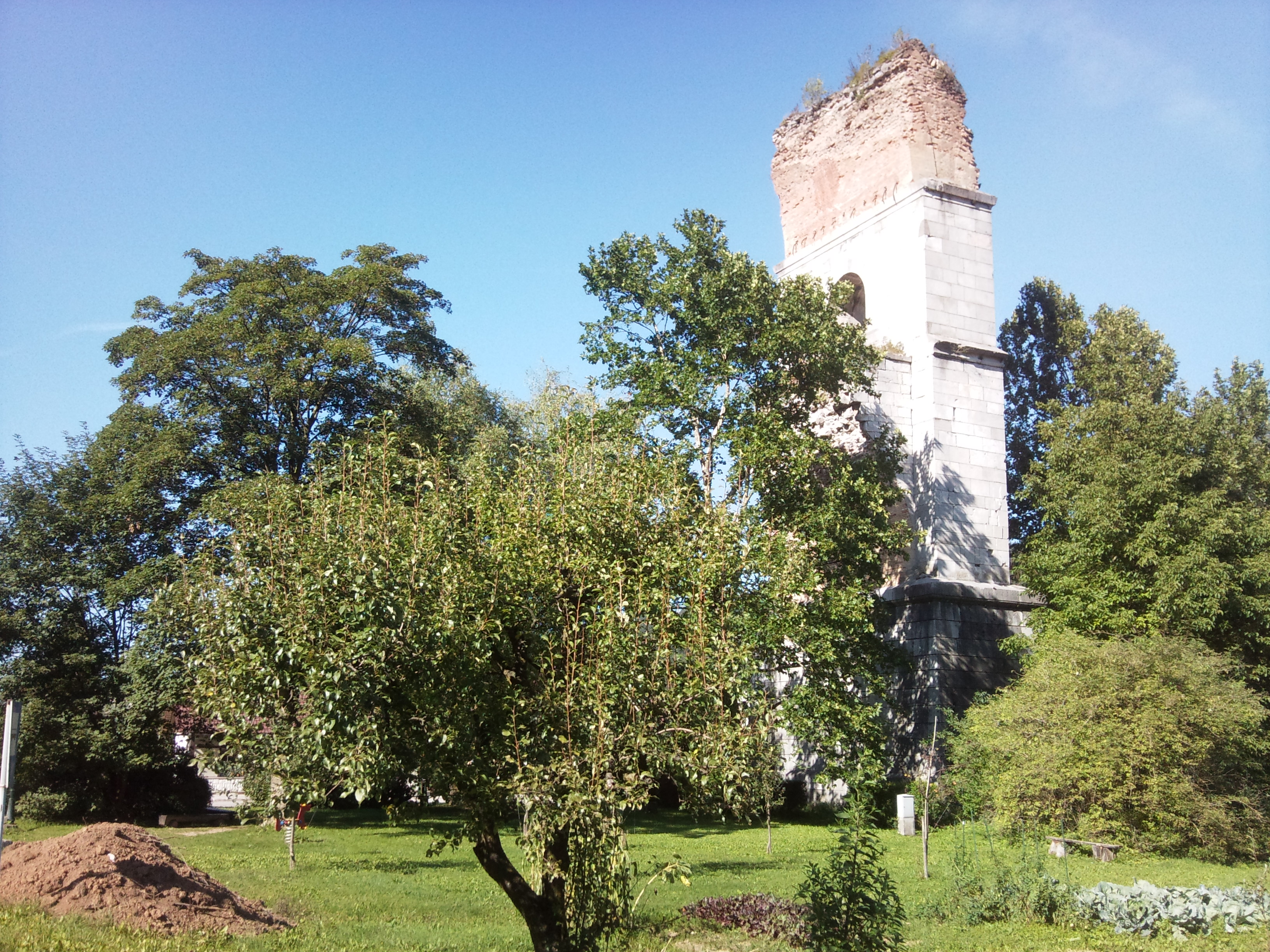
The remains of the railroad viaduct

A 48 m high railroad viaduct for the Austrian Southern Railway was built across the Borovnica Valley in 1856. On the night of 28 June 1942, Partisan forces attacked an Italian train carrying arrestees being sent to concentration camps in Italy, freeing about 300 prisoners. Those that refused to join the Partisans were executed and disposed of in the Krim Cave Mass Grave. The railroad viaduct 45°55′11″N 14°21′26″E was destroyed on 26 August 1944 in a 15th AF operation (301st BG & 483rd BG) that also killed 30 villagers.

At the end of the Second World War, a concentration camp for Italian prisoners of war was established in Borovnica. The prisoners, who were kept in squalid conditions without water and toilet facilities, were abused and Italian sources referred to the camp as the "new Dachau." Approximately 200 prisoners died at the camp. Many of the prisoners were transferred to other camps by the fall of 1945, and a November 1945 Red Cross report concluded that conditions had become acceptable. The camp was closed in mid-August 1946.

== Church ==
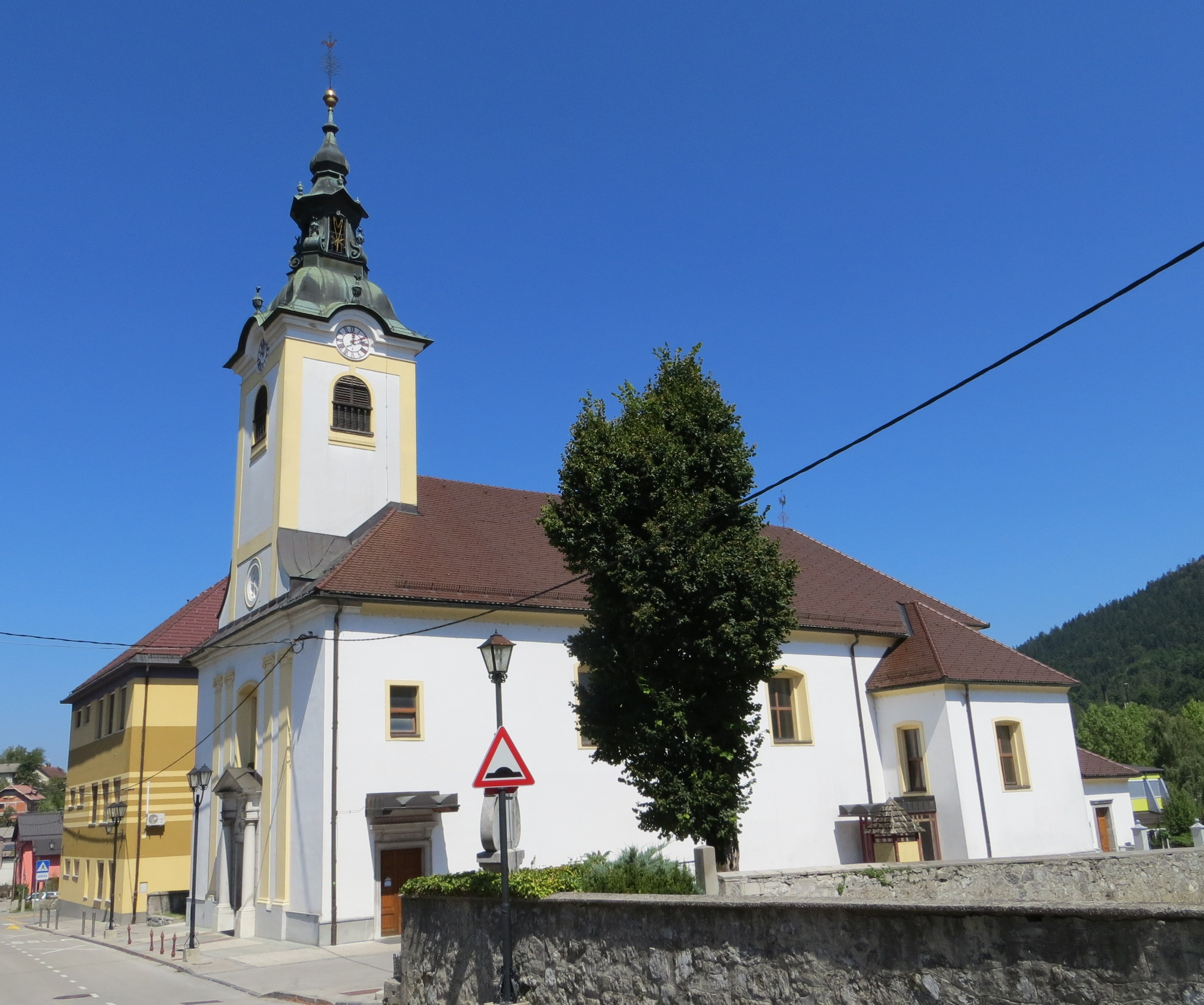
Saint Margaret's Church

The parish church in Borovnica is dedicated to Saint Margaret and belongs to the Ljubljana Archdiocese. A church was attested at the site in the mid-14th century, and the current structure dates from 1829.

== Notable people ==
Notable people that were born or lived in Borovnica include:

- Marja Boršnik (1906–1982), literary historian
- Ivan Kiferle (1856–1943), composer
- Jože Kranjc (1904–1966), writer and playwright
- Pavla Lah, a.k.a. Jerina (1915–2007), Partisan surgeon
- Simon Lampe (1865–1940), missionary and Ojibwe scholar in the United States
- Mirko Lebez (1912–1992), painter
- Pavel Ločnik (1888–1920), theater actor
- Anton Majaron (1876–1898), writer
- Danilo Majaron (1859–1931), politician
- Bogdan Osolnik (1920–), politician
- Ljudevit Perič (1884–1926), politician
- Leopold Suhodolčan (1928–1980), writer
- Anton Vadnjal (1886–1935), writer
- Josip Verbič (1869–1948), beekeeper
- Mirko Zupančič (1925–2014), actor and playwright
