= List of cities, towns, and villages in Slovenia: O =

This is a list of cities, towns, and villages in Slovenia, starting with O.

Settlement	Municipality
Občice	Dolenjske Toplice
Občine	Trebnje
Obla Gorica	Litija
Obloke	Tolmin
Obolno	Ivančna Gorica
Obrat	Benedikt
Obrež	Ormož
Obrežje pri Zidanem Mostu	Laško
Obrežje	Brežice
Obrežje	Radeče
Obrh pri Dragatušu	Črnomelj
Obrh	Dolenjske Toplice
Obrne	Bled
Obrov	Hrpelje-Kozina
Obrše	Lukovica
Ocinje	Rogašovci
Ocizla	Hrpelje-Kozina
Očeslavci	Gornja Radgona
Odolina	Hrpelje-Kozina
Odranci	Odranci
Odrga	Trebnje
Ogljenšak	Slovenska Bistrica
Ogorevc	Štore
Ograda	Bloke
Ogulin	Črnomelj
Ohonica	Borovnica
Ojstri Vrh	Železniki
Ojstrica	Dravograd
Ojstriška vas	Tabor (občina)
Ojstro	Laško
Ojstro	Trbovlje
Okljuka	Metlika
Oklukova Gora	Brežice
Okonina	Ljubno
Okoslavci	Radenci
Okoška Gora	Oplotnica
Okrog pri Motniku	Kamnik
Okrog	Litija
Okrog	Šentjur
Okroglice	Sevnica
Okroglo	Kamnik
Okroglo	Naklo
Olešče	Laško
Olika	Koper
Olimje	Podčetrtek
Olševek	Šenčur
Omota	Semič
Onek	Kočevje
Onkraj Meže	Mežica
Opale	Žiri
Opalkovo	Velike Lašče
Opatje selo	Miren-Kostanjevica
Oplotnica	Oplotnica
Orehek pri Materiji	Hrpelje-Kozina
Orehek	Cerkno
Orehek	Postojna
Orehova vas	Hoče-Slivnica
Orehovci	Gornja Radgona
Orehovec	Kostanjevica na Krki
Orehovec	Šmarje pri Jelšah
Orehovica	Šentjernej
Orehovica	Vipava
Orehovica	Zagorje ob Savi
Orehovlje	Kranj
Orehovlje	Miren-Kostanjevica
Orehovo	Sevnica
Orehovski Vrh	Gornja Radgona
Orešje na Bizeljskem	Brežice
Orešje nad Sevnico	Sevnica
Orešje	Šmarješke Toplice
Orkljevec	Mirna Peč
Orla vas	Braslovče
Orlaka	Trebnje
Orle	Škofljica
Orlek	Sežana
Ormož	Ormož
Ornuška vas	Trebnje
Orova vas	Polzela
Ortnek	Ribnica
Ortnice	Kozje
Osek	Nova Gorica
Osenca	Celje
Osilnica	Osilnica
Oskoršnica	Semič
Oskrt	Kostel
Oslica	Ivančna Gorica
Osluševci	Ormož
Osojnica	Žiri
Osojnik	Semič
Osojnik	Železniki
Osolnik	Medvode
Osp	Koper
Osrečje	Škocjan
Osredek nad Stično	Ivančna Gorica
Osredek pri Dobrovi	Dobrova-Polhov Gradec
Osredek pri Hubajnici	Sevnica
Osredek pri Krmelju	Sevnica
Osredek pri Podsredi	Kozje
Osredek pri Trški Gori	Krško
Osredek pri Zrečah	Zreče
Osredek	Cerknica
Osredek	Šentjur
Osredek	Velike Lašče
Osredek	Zagorje ob Savi
Osredke	Dol pri Ljubljani
Ostenk	Trbovlje
Ostrog	Šentjernej
Ostrovica	Divača
Ostrožnik	Trebnje
Ostrožno Brdo	Ilirska Bistrica
Ostrožno pri Ločah	Slovenske Konjice
Ostrožno pri Ponikvi	Šentjur
Ošelj	Slovenska Bistrica
Oševek	Kamnik
Oševljek	Nova Gorica
Oštrc	Krško
Otalež	Cerkno
Otavice	Ribnica
Otavnik	Sevnica
Otemna	Celje
Otiški Vrh	Dravograd
Otlica	Ajdovščina
Otoče	Radovljica
Otočec	Novo mesto
Otok	Cerknica
Otok	Metlika
Otonica	Cerknica
Otošče	Divača
Otovci	Puconci
Otovec	Črnomelj
Ovsiše	Radovljica
Ozeljan	Nova Gorica
Ožbalt	Podvelka
