= Osredek =

Osredek may refer to:

In Croatia:

- Osredek Desinićki, a village near Desinić
- Osredek Žumberački, a village near Samobor

In Slovenia:

- Osredek, Zagorje ob Savi
- Osredek, Cerknica
- Osredek, Velike Lašče
- Osredek, Šentjur
- Osredek pri Zrečah
- Osredek pri Hubajnici
- Osredek pri Dobrovi
- Osredek pri Podsredi
- Osredek nad Stično
- Osredek pri Krmelju
- Osredek pri Trški Gori
