= Orešje, Ajdovščina =

Orešje
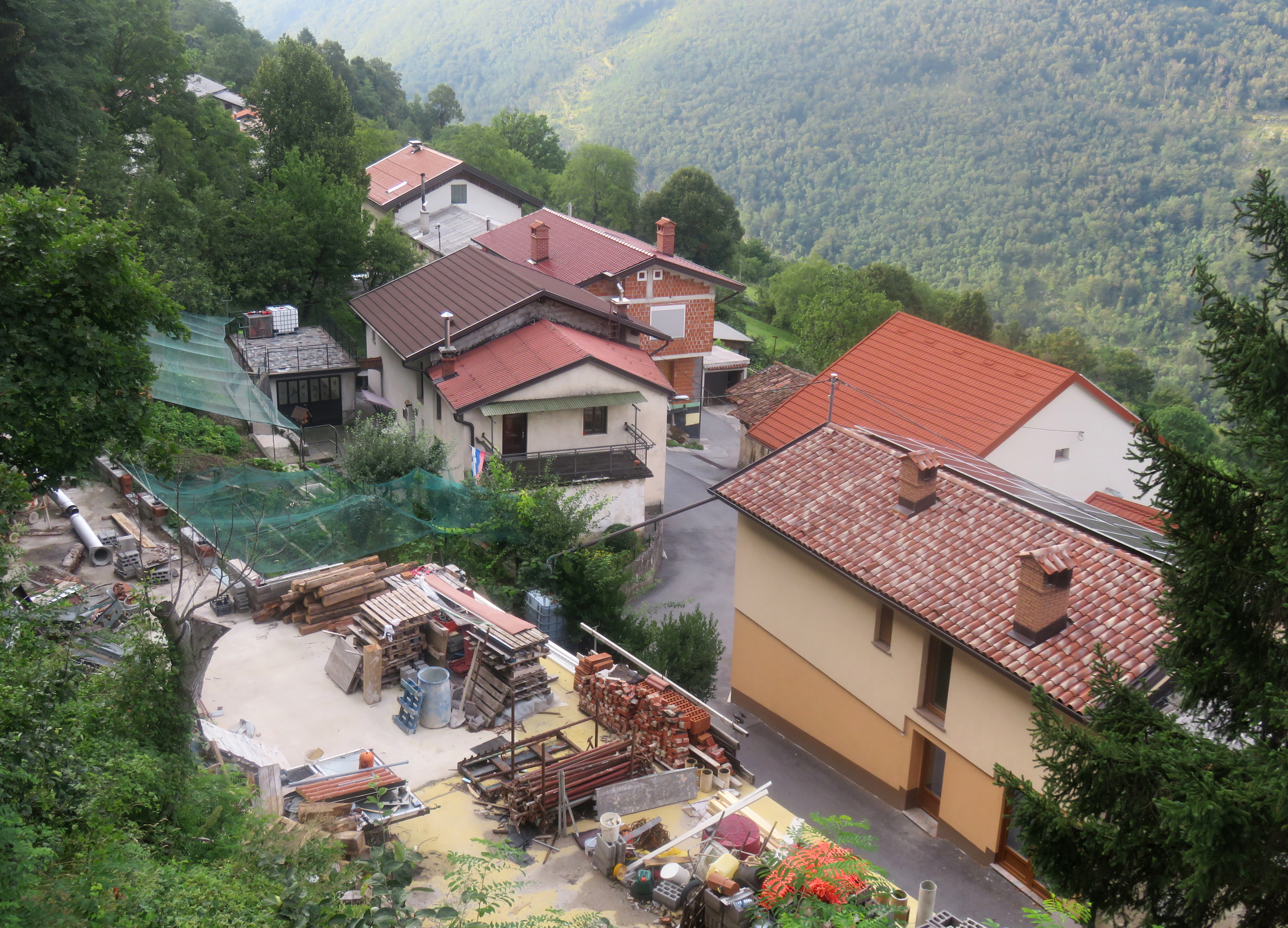

- Location in Slovenia
- Coordinates: 45°52′41″N 14°00′22″E
- Country: Slovenia
- Traditional region: Inner Carniola
- Statistical region: Gorizia
- Municipality: Ajdovščina
- Elevation: 638 m (2,093 ft)

Orešje (pronounced [ɔˈɾeːʃjɛ], German: Oreschie, Italian: Oressia) is a formerly independent settlement in the Municipality of Ajdovščina in southwestern Slovenia. It is now part of the town of Col. It is part of the traditional region of Inner Carniola and is now included with the rest of the municipality in the Gorizia Statistical Region.

== Geography ==
Orešje is a clustered village on a lee slope of a karst plateau where the road from Ajdovščina splits to Črni Vrh to the northeast and Podkraj to the southeast. Orešje is along the lower road, and Col proper stands on the upper road. A powerful spring below the road to Podkraj is the source of Sopotnik Creek, which flows steeply south to Bela Creek. The part of the village near the spring is called Pri studencu 'at the spring' (or Spodnje Orešje, literally 'lower Orešje'), and the part of the village above the spring is called Skoki (or Zgornje Orešje, literally 'upper Orešje'). The soil below the village has a marl character, and there are poor-quality pastures above the village.

== Name ==
Like similar place names in Slovenia (e.g., Orehovica, Orehovec, Orehovlje, etc.), the name Orešje is based on the root oreh 'walnut', thus referring to the local vegetation.

== History ==
Orešje had a population of 184 in 32 houses in 1880, 184 in 33 houses in 1890, 218 in 35 houses in 1900, and 277 in 42 houses in 1961. Orešje was annexed by Col in 1971, ending its existence as an independent settlement.

== Notable people ==
Notable people that were born or lived in Orešje include the following:

- Ivo Trošt (1865–1937), children's writer
