= Orehek, Cerkno =

Orehek

- Location in Slovenia
- Coordinates: 46°8′40.14″N 13°56′32.76″E
- Country: Slovenia
- Traditional region: Littoral
- Statistical region: Gorizia
- Municipality: Cerkno

Area
  - Total: 3.88 km^{2} (1.50 sq mi)
- Elevation: 542.4 m (1,780 ft)

Population (2020)
  - Total: 64
  - Density: 16/km^{2} (43/sq mi)

Orehek (pronounced [ɔˈɾeːxək]) is a dispersed settlement below Mount Kojca west of Cerkno in the traditional Littoral region of Slovenia.

== Geography ==
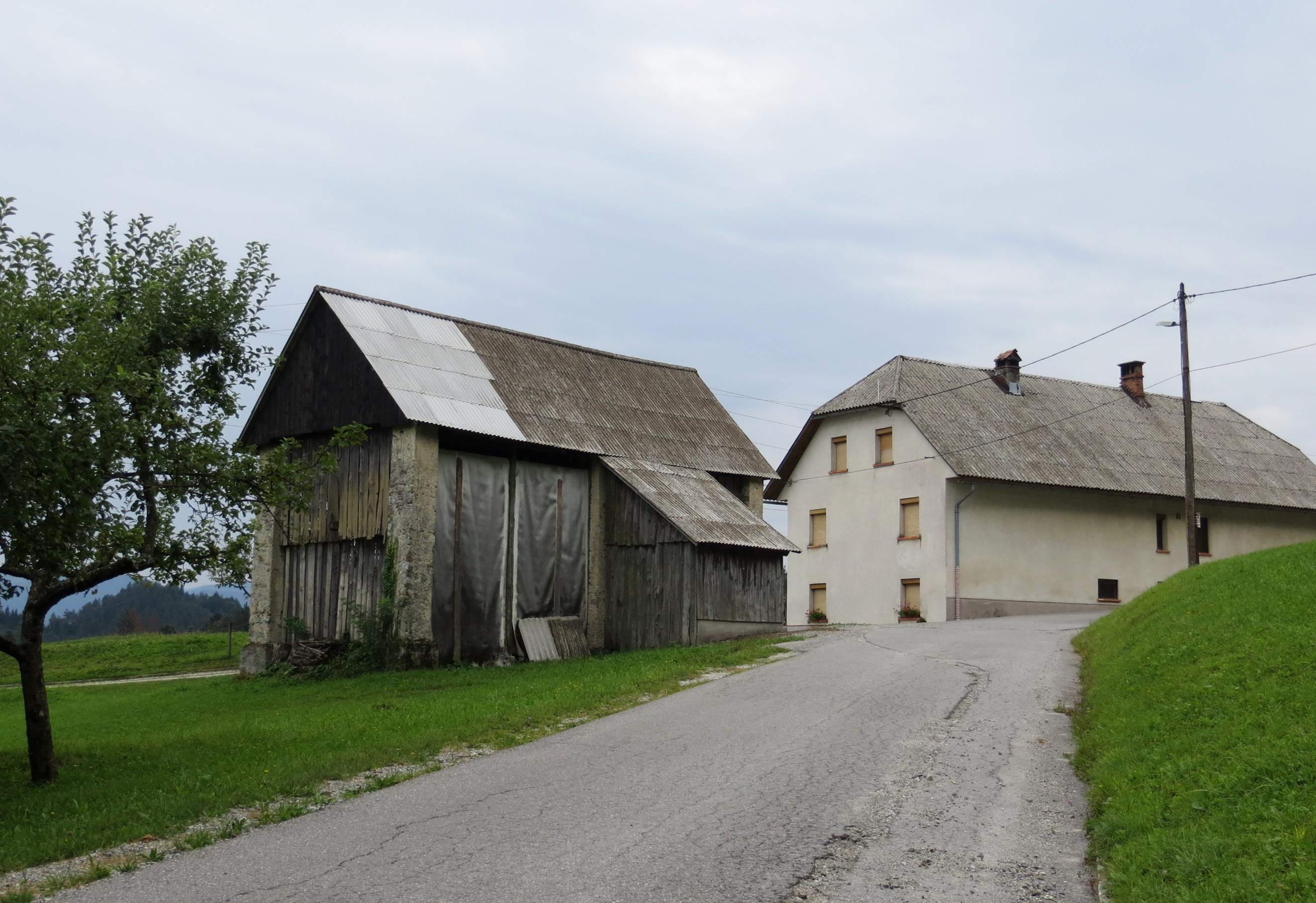
The hamlet of Nemci

In addition to the village center, Orehek contains the hamlets and isolated farmsteads of Gradež, Nemci, Zabrežnica, Mlinar, Abram, and Androjne. Orehek lies on a slope below Mount Kojca and Jesenica Creek flows through the village. The soil is sandy and marly, and there are tilled fields on very steep slopes, which traditionally necessitated carrying the soil from the last plowed furrow to the top of the field. Below the village there are tilled fields and meadows in the area known as Dovšca, and above the road there are low-quality hay fields in the area known as Pod Kojca (literally, 'below Mount Kojca').

== Name ==
Like similar place names in Slovenia (e.g., Orehovica, Orehovec, Orešje, etc.), the name Orehek is based on the root oreh 'walnut', thus referring to the local vegetation.

== History ==
The hamlet of Nemci (literally, 'Germans') is named after German miners that started mining lead ore here in 1787. The original church in the village, which was later demolished, stood in the hamlet and its site is now known as Pri stari cerkvi 'at the old church'. A water main was installed in Orehek in 1904. The writer France Bevk taught in Orehek from 1913 to 1914. During the Second World War, there was an engagement between Italian forces and the Partisans at Rodne Hill (689 meters or 2,260 feet) southwest of the village. The village came under attack by German forces in 1944. A fire caused by a short circuit destroyed most of the village on July 18, 1951—at the time, most of the houses still had thatched roofs. The locals established a dairy above the village in 1954.

== Church ==
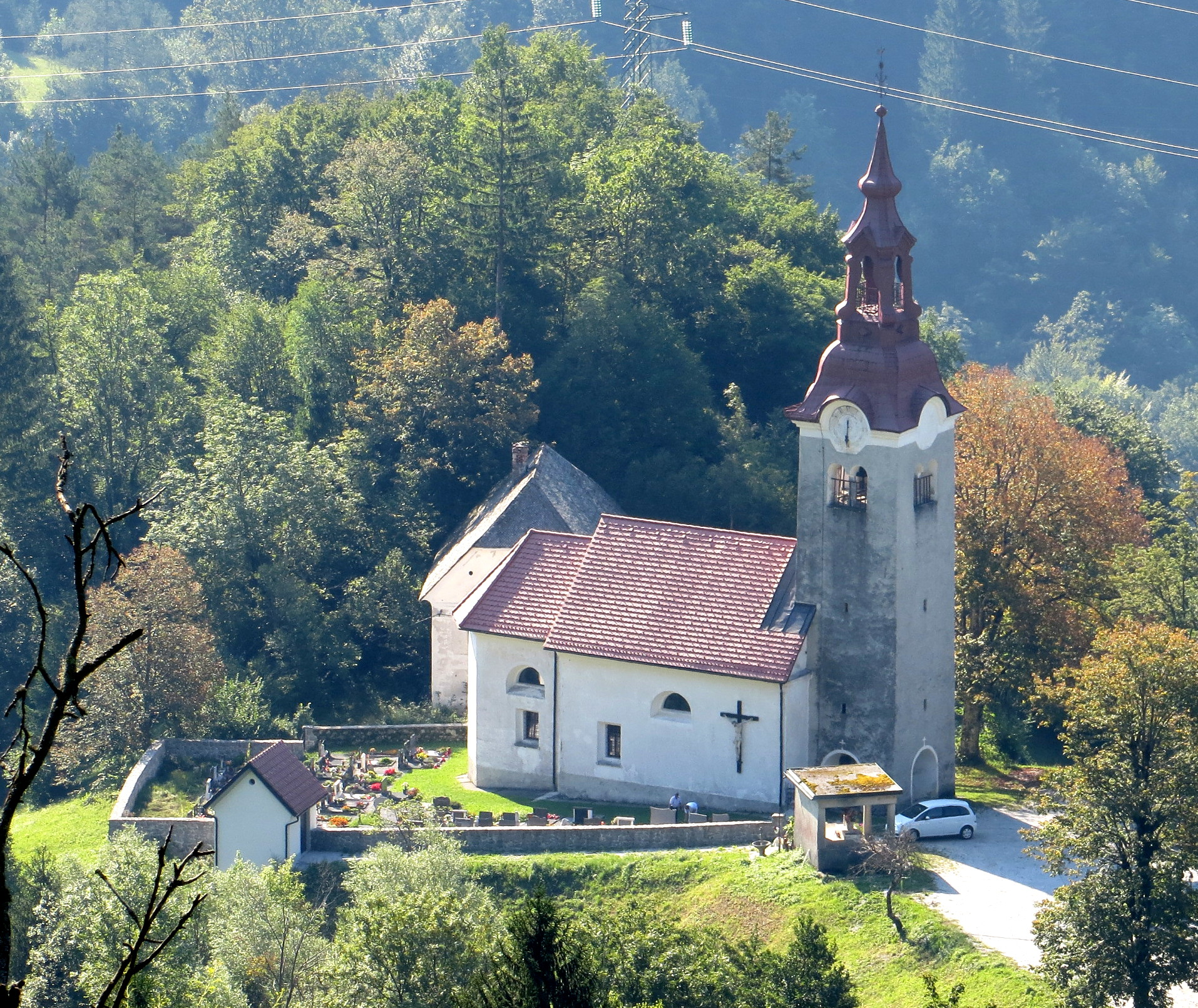
Saint Ubald's Church

The parish church in the settlement is dedicated to Saint Ubald and belongs to the Koper Diocese. It was built in 1755 and is a Baroque structure with a polygonal chancel walled on three sides, a wider rectangular nave, and a bell tower. The interior is barrel-vaulted and the furnishings date from the 19th century.
