= Ostrožno =

Ostrožno is a Slovene place name that may refer to:

- Ostrožno (local community), a local community of the City Municipality of Celje
- Ostrožno pri Ločah, a village in the Municipality of Slovenske Konjice, northeastern Slovenia
- Ostrožno pri Ponikvi, a village in the Municipality of Šentjur, eastern Slovenia
