= Orehovica =

Orehovica may refer to:

- Orehovica, Međimurje County, a village and municipality in Croatia
- Orehovica, Krapina-Zagorje County, a village near Bedekovčina, Croatia
- Orehovica, Rijeka, a suburb of Rijeka, Croatia
  - Orehovica interchange on the Croatian motorway A6
- Orehovica, Vipava, a village in Slovenia
- Orehovica, Zagorje ob Savi, a village in Slovenia
- Orehovica, Šentjernej, a village in Slovenia

== See also ==
- Orahovica, a town in Virovitica-Podravina County, Croatia
