= Orešje =

Orešje may refer to:

- Orešje, Sveta Nedelja, a village in Zagreb County, Croatia
- Orešje, Ajdovščina, a village in Slovenia
- Orešje, Šmarješke Toplice, a village in Slovenia
- Orešje Okićko, a village in Zagreb County, Croatia
- Orešje Humsko, a village near Hum na Sutli, Krapina-Zagorje County, Croatia
- Orešje nad Sevnico, a village in Slovenia
- Orešje na Bizeljskem, a village in Slovenia
- Donje Orešje, a village near Sveti Ivan Zelina, Zagreb County, Croatia
- Gornje Orešje, a village near Sveti Ivan Zelina, Zagreb County, Croatia
