= Orehovica, Vipava =

Orehovica
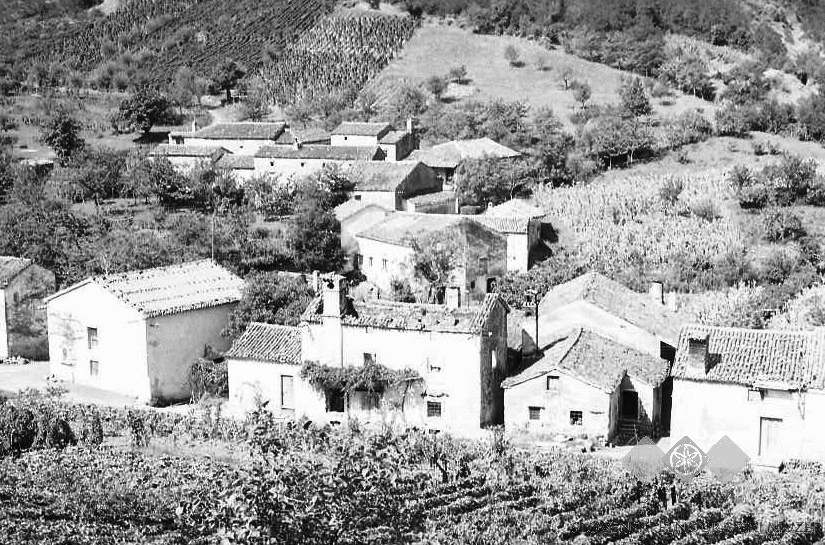
- Orehovica in 1958

- Location in Slovenia
- Coordinates: 45°47′29.88″N 13°58′3.03″E
- Country: Slovenia
- Traditional region: Littoral
- Statistical region: Gorizia
- Municipality: Vipava

Area
  - Total: 0.98 km^{2} (0.38 sq mi)
- Elevation: 195.2 m (640 ft)

Population (2002)
  - Total: 157

Orehovica (pronounced [ɔˈɾeːxɔʋitsa]) is a small settlement south of Podnanos in the upper Vipava Valley in the Municipality of Vipava in the Littoral region of Slovenia.

== Geography ==
Orehovica is a compact village in the valley of Dog Tail Creek (Slovene: Pasji rep), which starts at Vrhi below Lakovec Hill (591 m). Kunovec Creek, a left tributary, joins it in the settlement. The flat areas of the settlement are covered by meadows and fields, and vineyards cover the southern slope of the ridge above the valley. The forest in the settlement extends to Mount Nanos.

== Name ==
The name Orehovica and names like it (e.g., Orehovec, Orehovci, Orehovlje, Orešje) are relatively common in Slovenia. It is derived from the common noun oreh 'walnut', thus referring to the local vegetation.

== Church ==
A chapel of ease dedicated to the Trinity stands above the settlement. The church was consecrated in 1642. It contains a carved altar dating to the 18th century. The church was almost entirely rebuilt in 1987–1988, and it was reconsecrated on 28 August 1988.
