= Anton Strle =

Slovenian dogmatic theologian and Catholic priest

Servant of God Anton Strle

Priest
- Born: 21 January 1915; Osredek, Cerknica, Slovenia
- Died: 20 October 2003 (aged 88); Ljubljana, Slovenia
- Venerated in: Roman Catholic Church

Anton Strle (21 January 1915 – 20 October 2003) was a Slovenian professor of dogmatic theology and a Catholic priest. He was born in the village of Osredek in the parish of Sveti Vid nad Cerknico. He was ordained priest in 1941 and received his D.D. degree in 1944 from the University of Ljubljana.

After World War II he spent many years in prison and in forced labour, falsely accused like many other priests in communist Yugoslavia. Later he worked as a parish administrator in Planina pri Rakeku. He lectured on dogmatics and patrology for forty years at the Faculty of Theology in Ljubljana.

All the time he was also active in pastoral work, for example in Holy Trinity parish in Ljubljana. He published 45 books and reproduced lecture notes for various fields of theology. He also translated several important works, for example Vera Cerkve (Denzinger's Enchiridion Symbolorum et Definitionum) and all the documents of the Second Vatican Council. For many years, he was a member of the doctrinal commission of the Yugoslav Bishops' Conference and a member of the International Theological Commission of the Holy See in Rome. In 1977, he was appointed a papal domestic prelate by Pope Paul VI.

In March 2015, his cause was officially opened by the Roman Catholic Archdiocese of Ljubljana. He is currently revered as a Servant of God.

== Sources ==
- "Prof. dr. Anton Strle". Light of the Church (in Slovenian). Archived from the original on 2011-07-25."Prof. dr. Anton Strle". Light of the Church (in Slovenian). Archived from the original on 2011-07-25.
- Spiritual family Work about Strle in Slovenian (Duhovna družina Delo o Strletu)
- https://web.archive.org/web/20111002121121/http://www.informationdelight.info/encyclopedia/entry/Lloydminster%2C_Alberta/List_of_famous_Slovenians Famous Slovenians
- http://www.ask.com/bar?q=Strle+Anton&page=2&qsrc=2457&dm=all&ab=5&u=http%3A%2F%2Fwww.experiencefestival.com%2F1941_-_january&sg=5qibydILkOTb6AqvUMCBfkkg0%2FpqULEDEF4gniypEcs%3D%0D%0A&tsp=1279403067422 Search ask about Strle Anton
- https://www.sticna.com/vrtnice/profesor_anton_strle_1915_2003.html Professor Anton Strle - On way to Roses (Lecture about Jesus's Heart) in Slovenian (Professor Anton Strle – Vrtnicam na pot)
- Anton Štrukelj (2011). "Strle, Anton". In Bautz, Traugott (ed.). Biographisch-Bibliographisches Kirchenlexikon (BBKL) (in German). Vol. 32. Nordhausen: Bautz. cols. 1357–1377. ISBN 978-3-88309-615-5.
