= Sela pri Otovcu =

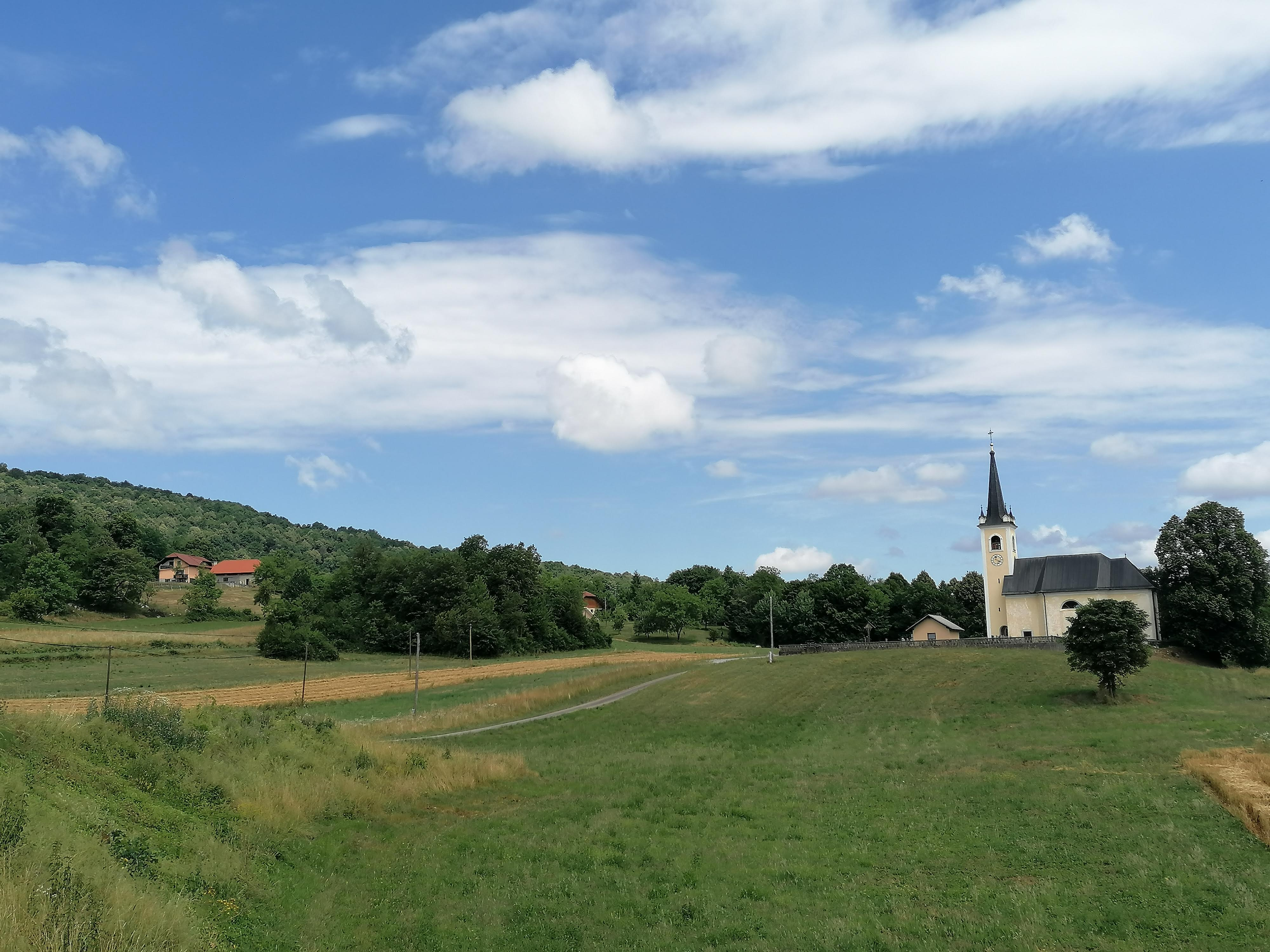

- Location in Slovenia
- Coordinates: 45°35′48.68″N 15°9′45.51″E
- Country: Slovenia
- Traditional region: White Carniola
- Statistical region: Southeast Slovenia
- Municipality: Črnomelj

Area
  - Total: 1.08 km^{2} (0.42 sq mi)
- Elevation: 205.8 m (675 ft)

Population (2020)
  - Total: 71
  - Density: 66/km^{2} (170/sq mi)
- Postal code: 8340

Sela pri Otovcu (pronounced [ˈseːla pɾi ˈoːtɔu̯tsu]) is a settlement north of Črnomelj in the White Carniola area of southeastern Slovenia. The area is part of the traditional region of Lower Carniola and is now included in the Southeast Slovenia Statistical Region.

== Church ==
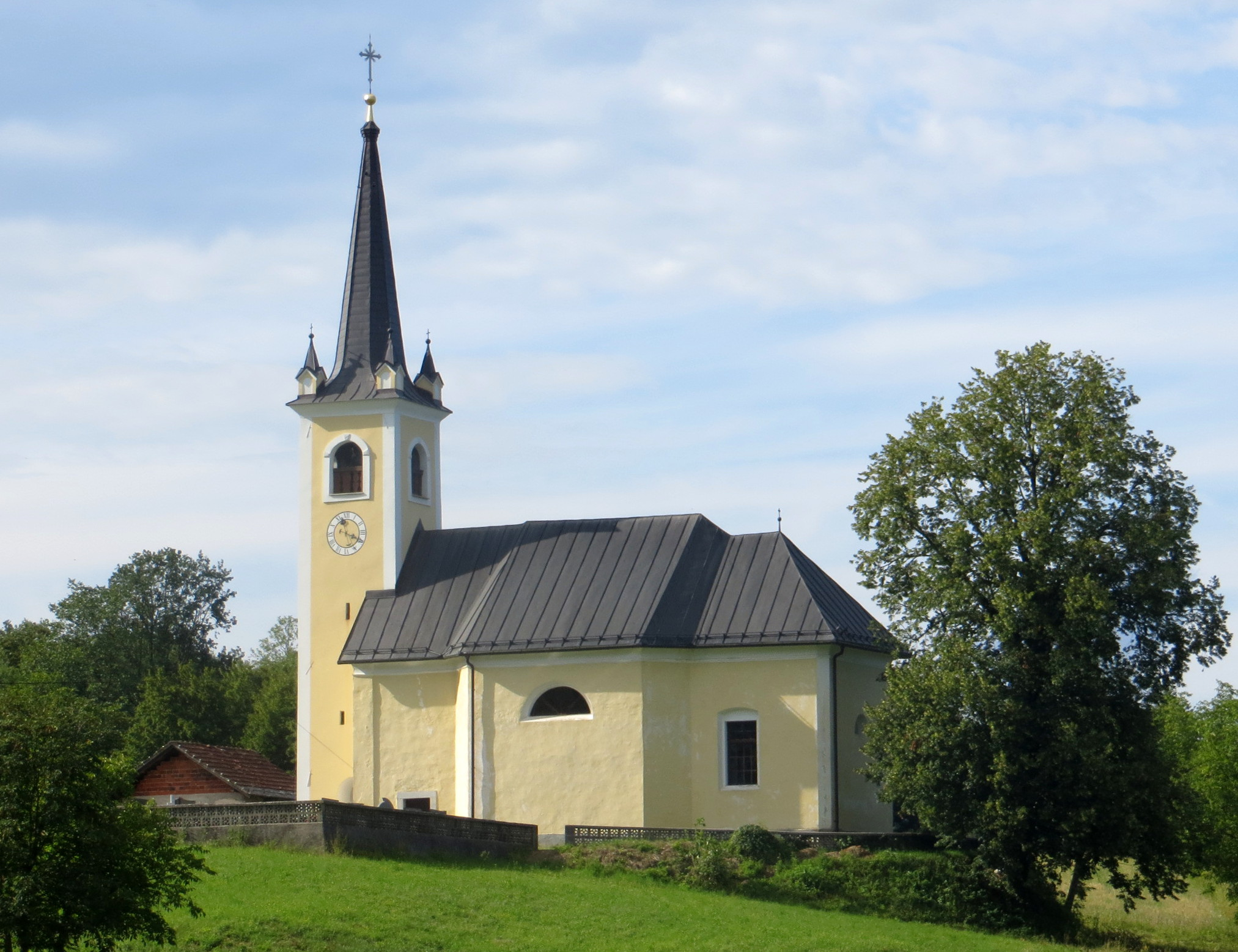
Saint Bartholomew's Church

The local church, to the south of the settlement and known as the Otovec church, although it is built on the territory of Sela, is dedicated to Saint Bartholomew (Slovene: sveti Jernej) and belongs to the Parish of Črnomelj. It is a Baroque building erected in the mid-18th century on the site of an older church mentioned in written documents dating to 1526.
