= Občice =

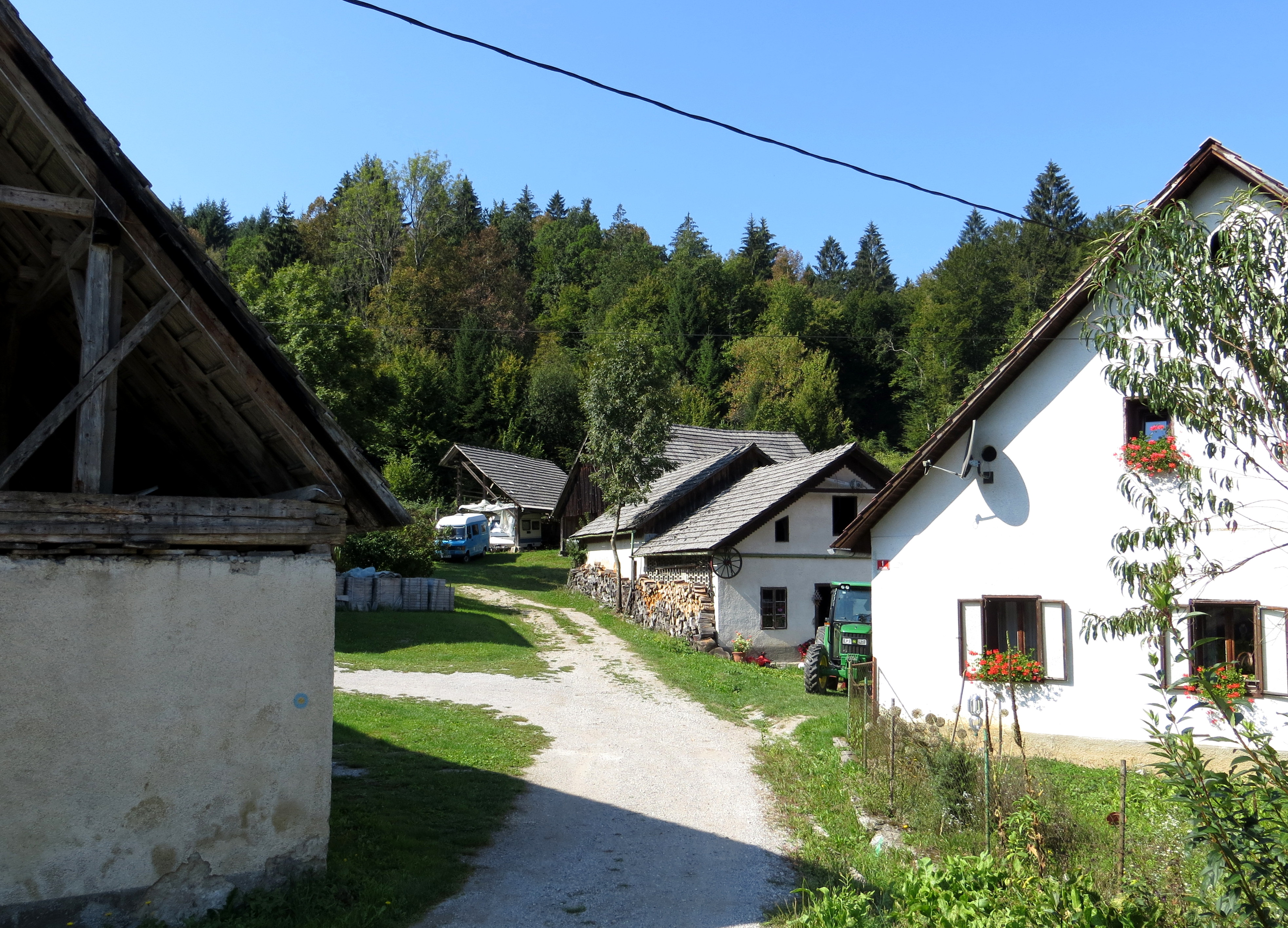

- Location in Slovenia
- Coordinates: 45°43′52.36″N 15°3′26.25″E
- Country: Slovenia
- Traditional region: Lower Carniola
- Statistical region: Southeast Slovenia
- Municipality: Dolenjske Toplice

Area
  - Total: 5.3 km^{2} (2.0 sq mi)
- Elevation: 236.5 m (776 ft)

Population (2020)
  - Total: 61
  - Density: 12/km^{2} (30/sq mi)

Občice (pronounced [ˈopːtʃitsɛ]; in older sources also Občica, German: Krapflern, Gottscheerish: Kropflarn) is a small settlement in the Municipality of Dolenjske Toplice in Slovenia. It lies on the eastern edge of the Gottschee region. The area is part of the historical region of Lower Carniola. The municipality is now included in the Southeast Slovenia Statistical Region.

== Geography ==
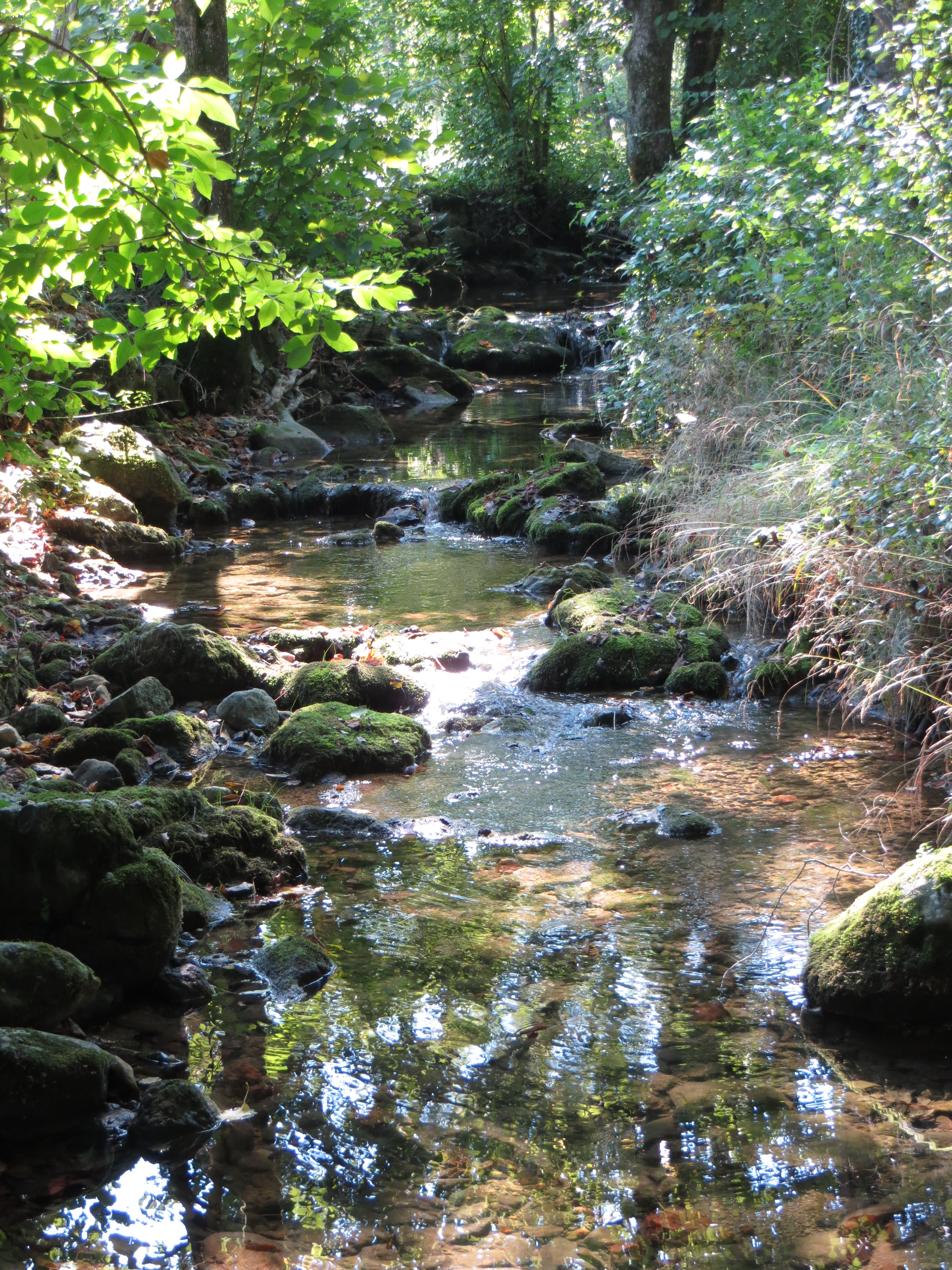
Črmošnjičica Creek in Občice

Občice is a clustered village lying on either side of Črmošnjičica Creek, also known as Wild Creek (Slovene: Divji potok), which soon sinks into the ground and then resurfaces below Kočevske Poljane along the road to Dolenjske Toplice. Some of the farms in the village are scattered across the nearby slopes above the valley. Nearby elevations include Little Rigelj Hill (Slovene: Mali Rigelj; 307 meters or 1,007 feet) to the northeast, where there are vineyards, and forested Green Hill (Slovene: Zelena gorica; 645 meters or 2,116 feet) to the west. There are tilled fields and meadows on both sides of the valley.

== Name ==
The Slovene name Občice is of uncertain origin. Like the toponyms Občine and Opčine, it may be derived from the Slovene adjective obči 'held in common' from the Slavic root *obьťь, referring to an early landholding arrangement. The German name Krapflern is believed to be based on the surname of an early settler, Krapf or Kropf.

== History ==
Občice was a Gottschee German settlement. It was listed in the 1574 land registry as having two full farms divided into four half-farms with five owners, corresponding to a population between 20 and 25. The population grew to 129 people living in 24 houses in 1869, but then declined, numbering only 56 people in 20 houses in 1921, and 69 people in 1936. At this time, the economy of the village was based on agriculture, with sales of potatoes, wheat, barley, rye, and beans to Novo Mesto, livestock sales at fairs, apples and plums to Straža, wine in the immediate area, and wood to the steam-powered sawmill at Straža. The original inhabitants were evicted on 7 and 8 December 1941. In 1944/45 a Partisan courier station operated in house no. 7 (Note: Cited as house no. 6 or 8 elsewhere.) as well as the headquarters for courier relay line 15 (Slovene: TV 15), which coordinated 145 such stations. A plaque commemorating the courier headquarters was unveiled on 21 July 1957. Most of the buildings in the village survived the war intact. After the war, the population of Občice increased to 75 in 1961. It then declined, but rose to 65 in 2011.

== Society of Native Gottschee Settlers ==
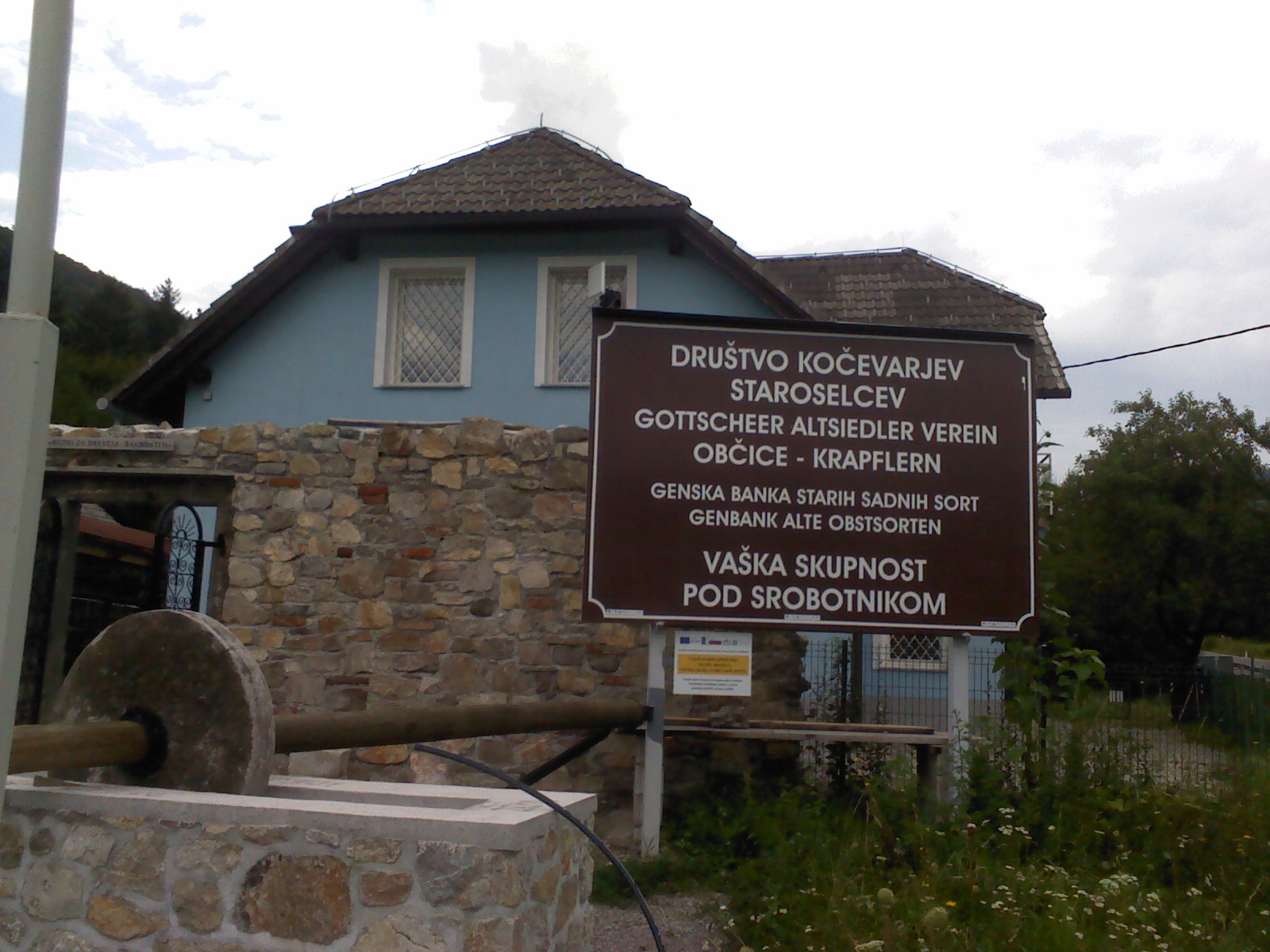
Society of Native Gottschee Settlers

The Society of Native Gottschee Settlers (Društvo Kočevarjev staroselcev / Gottscheer Altsiedlerverein) founded by descendants of Gottschee Germans in neighboring Kočevske Poljane in 1992, among them some of the last speakers of Gottscheerish, has its seat in a former inn purchased by the association in 1998. In 2012, the younger generation also founded the Črmošnjice Institute (German: Einrichtung Moschnitze) and the Srobotnik Cultural Tourism Association (German: Kulturtouristische Verein unter dem Gutenberg).

== Notable people ==
Notable people that were born or lived in Občice include:

- Rudolf Kapš (a.k.a. Rudolf Kapsch) (1916–1988), local historian
