= Orehovlje, Kranj =

Orehovlje
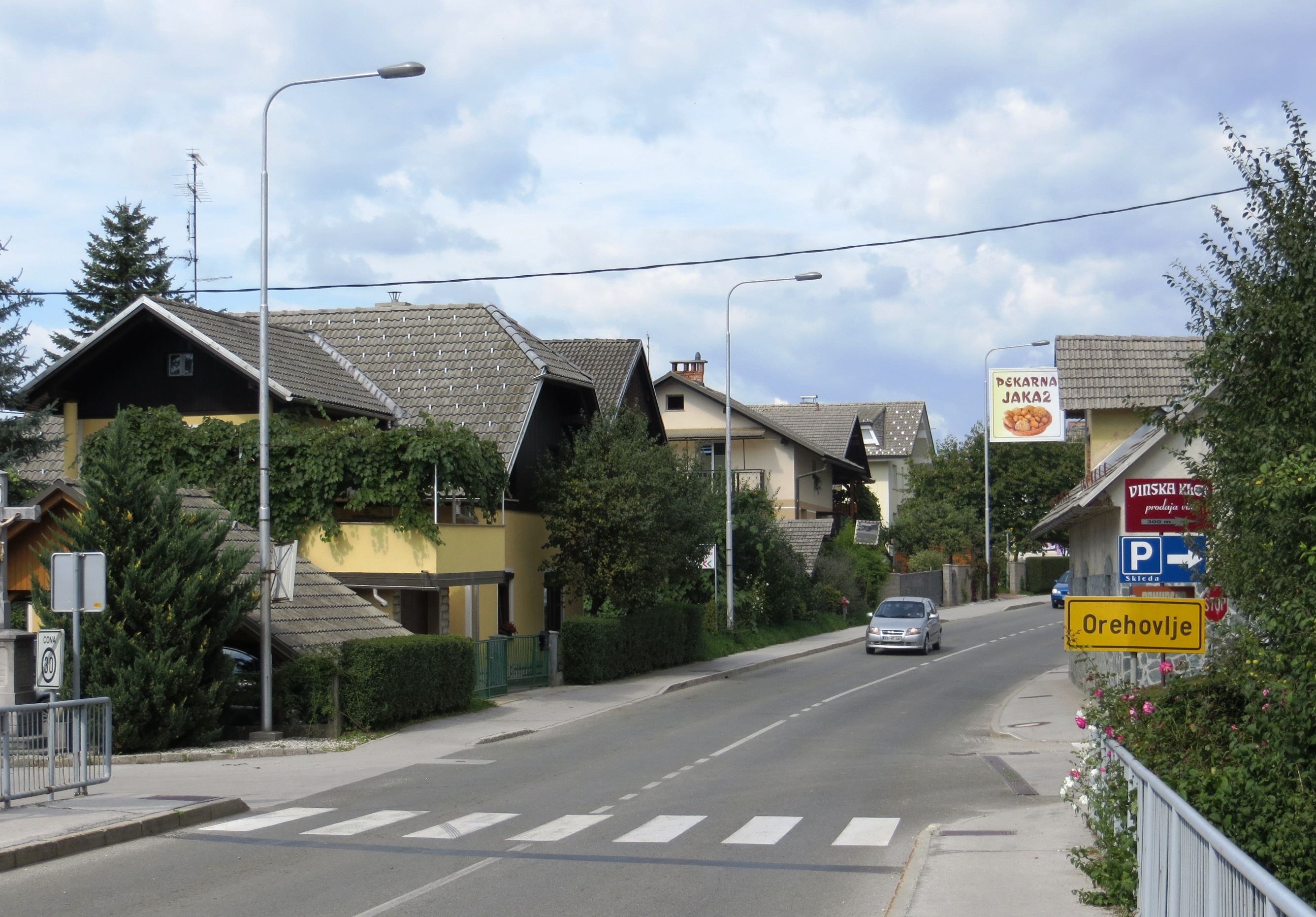

- Location in Slovenia
- Coordinates: 46°15′54.23″N 14°22′23.67″E
- Country: Slovenia
- Traditional region: Upper Carniola
- Statistical region: Upper Carniola
- Municipality: Kranj

Area
  - Total: 0.16 km^{2} (0.062 sq mi)
- Elevation: 413.5 m (1,357 ft)

Population (2021)
  - Total: 178

Orehovlje (pronounced [ɔˈɾeːxɔljɛ]) is a settlement on the right bank of the Kokra River in the Municipality of Kranj in the Upper Carniola region of Slovenia.

== Name ==
Like similar place names in Slovenia (e.g., Orehovica, Orehovec, Orešje, etc.), the name Orehovlje is based on the root oreh 'walnut', thus referring to the local vegetation.
