= Primož, Sevnica =

Primož Sveti Primož (until 1955)
- Location in Slovenia
- Coordinates: 45°58′12.68″N 15°17′41.91″E
- Country: Slovenia
- Traditional region: Lower Carniola
- Statistical region: Lower Sava
- Municipality: Sevnica

Area
  - Total: 0.64 km^{2} (0.25 sq mi)
- Elevation: 536.7 m (1,761 ft)

Population (2002)
  - Total: 25

Primož (pronounced [ˈpɾiːmɔʃ]; German: Sankt Primus) is a small village in the hills south of Boštanj in the Municipality of Sevnica in central Slovenia. The area is part of the historical region of Lower Carniola. The municipality is now included in the Lower Sava Statistical Region.

== Name ==
The name of the settlement was changed from Sveti Primož (literally, 'Saint Primus') to Primož (literally, 'Primus') in 1955. The name was changed on the basis of the 1948 Law on Names of Settlements and Designations of Squares, Streets, and Buildings as part of efforts by Slovenia's postwar communist government to remove religious elements from toponyms. In the past the German name was Sankt Primus.

== Church ==
The local church from which the settlement gets its name is dedicated to Saint Primus and belongs to the Parish of Studenec. It was originally a Romanesque building that was heavily rebuilt in the Baroque in the 17th century.
