= Rovišče pri Studencu =

- Location in Slovenia
- Coordinates: 45°57′23.8″N 15°21′16.21″E
- Country: Slovenia
- Traditional region: Lower Carniola
- Statistical region: Lower Sava
- Municipality: Sevnica

Area
  - Total: 1.66 km^{2} (0.64 sq mi)
- Elevation: 307.7 m (1,010 ft)

Population (2002)
  - Total: 154

Rovišče pri Studencu (pronounced [ɾɔˈʋiːʃtʃɛ pɾi stuˈdɛːntsu]) is a nucleated settlement in the Municipality of Sevnica in central Slovenia. The area is part of the historical region of Lower Carniola. The municipality is now included in the Lower Sava Statistical Region.

== Name ==
The name of the settlement was changed from Rovišče to Rovišče pri Studencu in 1955.

== Church ==
The local church is dedicated to Saint Ulrich (Slovene: sveti Urh) and belongs to the Parish of Studenec. It dates to the 17th century.
