= Obloke =

- Village
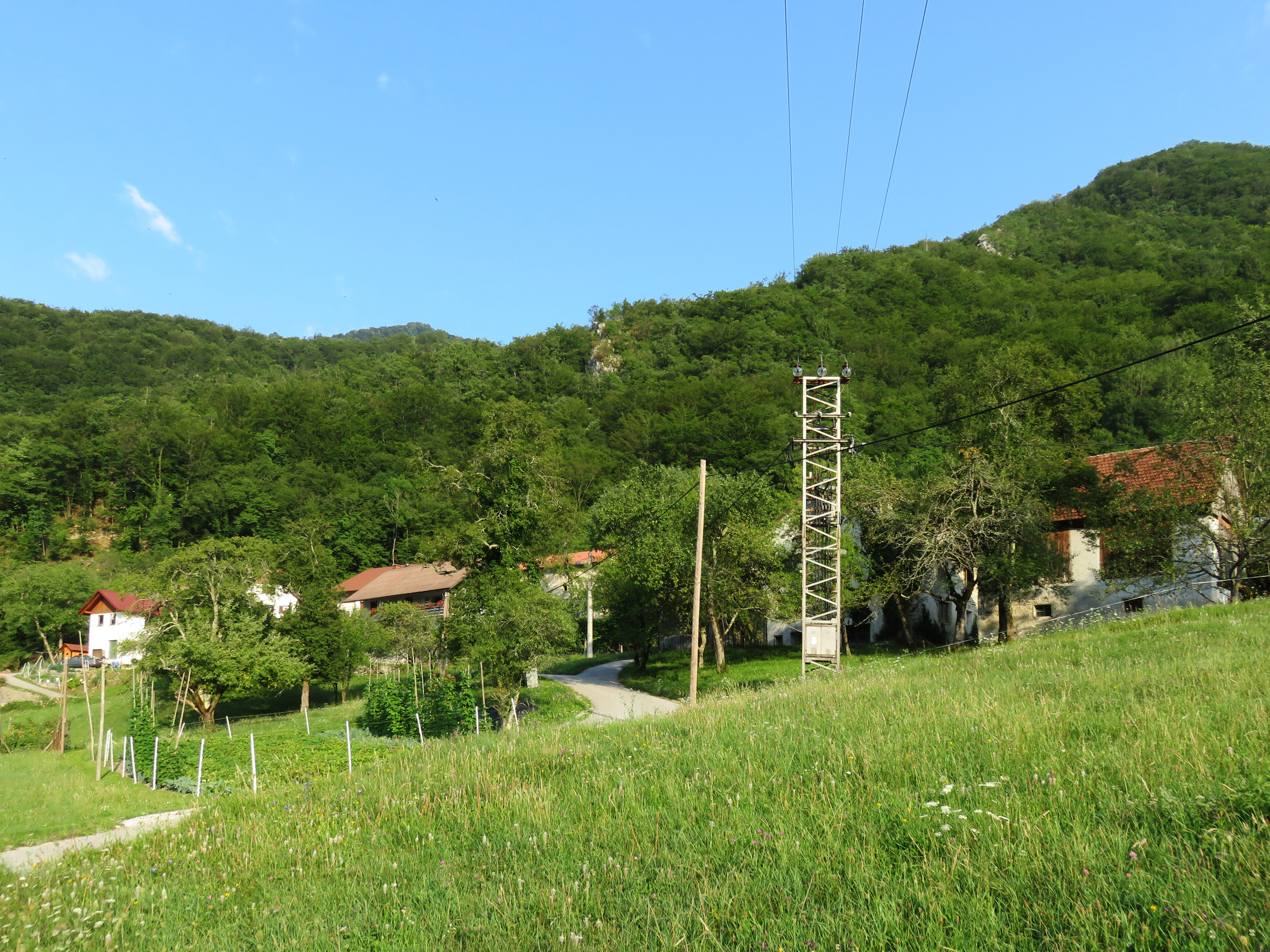

- Location in Slovenia
- Coordinates: 46°10′31.67″N 13°54′26.13″E
- Country: Slovenia
- Traditional region: Slovenian Littoral
- Statistical region: Gorizia
- Municipality: Tolmin

Area
  - Total: 2.93 km^{2} (1.13 sq mi)
- Elevation: 521.9 m (1,712 ft)

Population (2025)
  - Total: 17

Obloke (Slovene pronunciation: [ɔˈbloːkɛ]) is a small village on the right bank of the Bača River in the Municipality of Tolmin in the Slovenian Littoral region of western Slovenia. The settlement lies in the Bača Valley, with steep surrounding hills, rural landscapes, and transport links running through the valley corridor.

== Geography ==
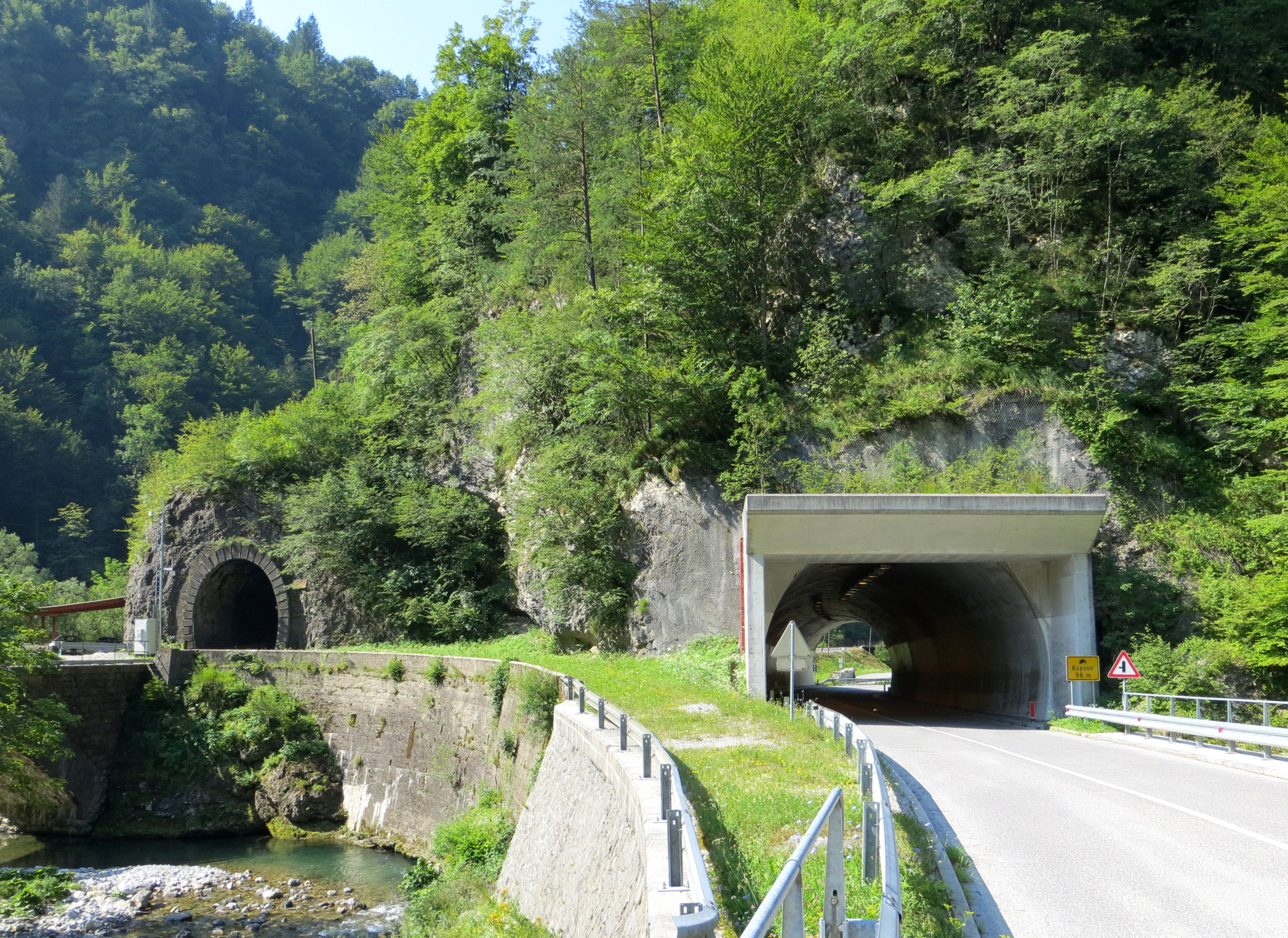
The Kupovo road and rail tunnels near Obloke

Obloke is located in the lower Bača Valley between the settlements of Hudajužna and Koritnica. The village stands at an elevation of 521.9 meters (1,712 ft) above sea level and covers an area of 2.93 square kilometers (1.13 sq mi).

The southern part of the settlement's territory contains the Kupovo road and railway tunnels, which form part of the transport route connecting settlements in the Bača Gorge. The railway line is part of the historic Bohinj Railway, a route linking western Slovenia with the interior of the country.

== Church ==
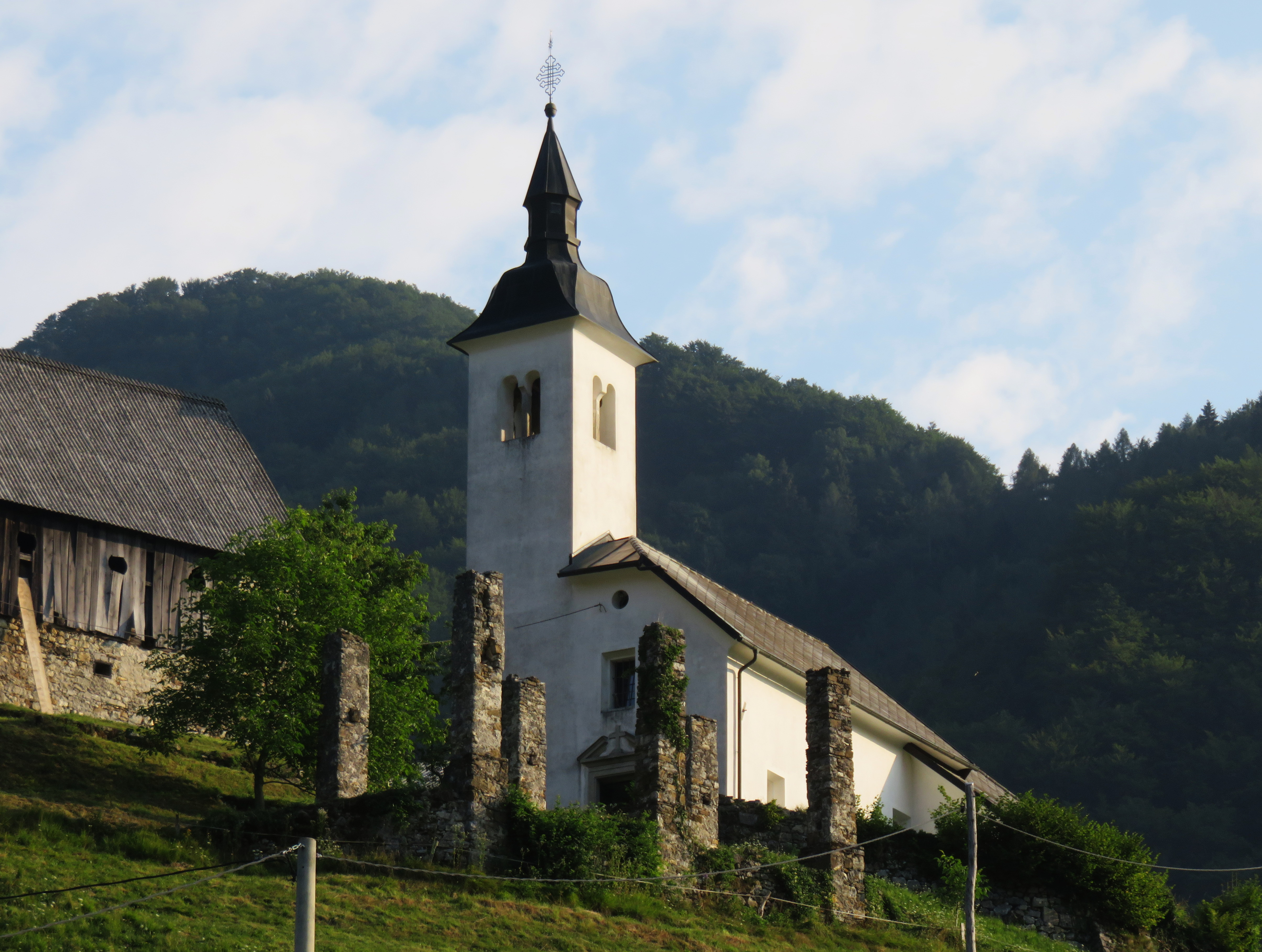
Three Kings Church

The local church in Obloke is dedicated to the Three Kings. It belongs to the Diocese of Koper and is a religious and cultural landmark for the settlement.

== Demographics ==
Obloke had a population of 17 in 2025.
