= Osredek pri Hubajnici =

- Location in Slovenia
- Coordinates: 45°57′32.59″N 15°19′14.12″E
- Country: Slovenia
- Traditional region: Lower Carniola
- Statistical region: Lower Sava
- Municipality: Sevnica

Area
  - Total: 0.94 km^{2} (0.36 sq mi)
- Elevation: 407.3 m (1,336 ft)

Population (2002)
  - Total: 14

Osredek pri Hubajnici (pronounced [ɔˈsɾeːdək pɾi xuˈbaːi̯nitsi]) is a small settlement southwest of Studenec in the Municipality of Sevnica in central Slovenia. The area is part of the historical region of Lower Carniola. The municipality is now included in the Lower Sava Statistical Region.

== Name ==
The name of the settlement was changed from Osredek to Osredek pri Hubajnici in 1953.

== Cultural heritage ==
An Early Iron Age burial ground with 37 burial mounds has been identified near the settlement.
