= Studenec, Sevnica =

Studenec
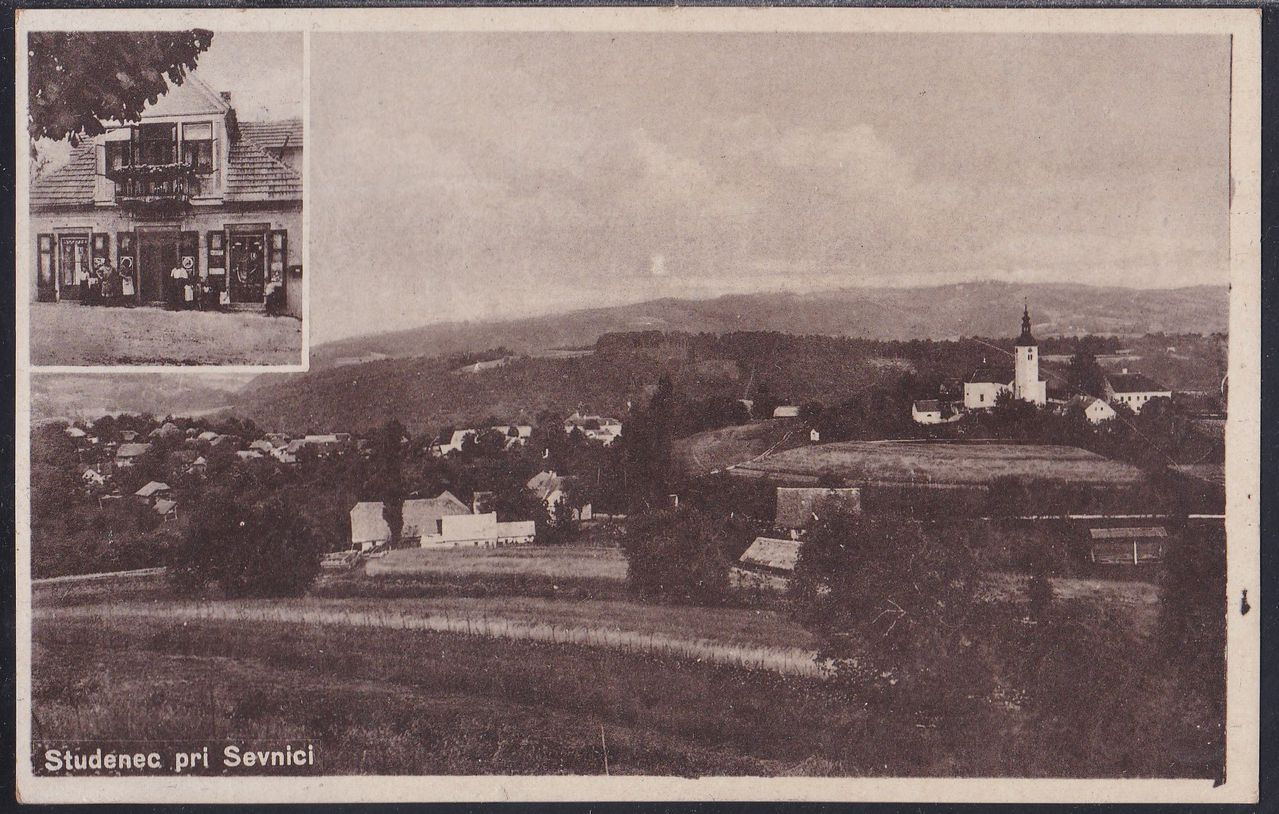
- 1937 postcard of Studenec

- Location in Slovenia
- Coordinates: 45°58′15.68″N 15°20′58.89″E
- Country: Slovenia
- Traditional region: Lower Carniola
- Statistical region: Lower Sava
- Municipality: Sevnica

Area
  - Total: 3.89 km^{2} (1.50 sq mi)
- Elevation: 376 m (1,234 ft)

Population (2002)
  - Total: 196

Studenec (pronounced [stuˈdɛːnəts]; German: Bründl) is a settlement in the Municipality of Sevnica in central Slovenia. The area is part of the historical region of Lower Carniola. The municipality is now included in the Lower Sava Statistical Region.

The local parish church, built on a small hill to the southwest of the settlement core, is dedicated to the Immaculate Conception and belongs to the Roman Catholic Diocese of Novo Mesto. It is a medieval building that was restyled in the Baroque in the second quarter of the 18th century. The churches in Rovišče and Primož are under the jurisdiction of the Parish of Studenec.
