= Okrog, Litija =

Okrog
- Location in Slovenia
- Coordinates: 45°58′33.82″N 14°58′46.11″E
- Country: Slovenia
- Traditional region: Lower Carniola
- Statistical region: Central Sava
- Municipality: Litija

Area
  - Total: 1.28 km^{2} (0.49 sq mi)
- Elevation: 424.7 m (1,393 ft)

Population (2002)
  - Total: 14
- Postal code: 1274

Okrog (pronounced [ˈoːkɾɔk]; German: Ukrog) is a small settlement south of Gabrovka in the Municipality of Litija in central Slovenia. The area is part of the traditional region of Lower Carniola. It is now included with the rest of the municipality in the Central Sava Statistical Region. The settlement is known as Ukrog in the local dialect. It includes the hamlet of Dule (in older sources also Dole, German: Dule).
