= Otok, Cerknica =

Otok
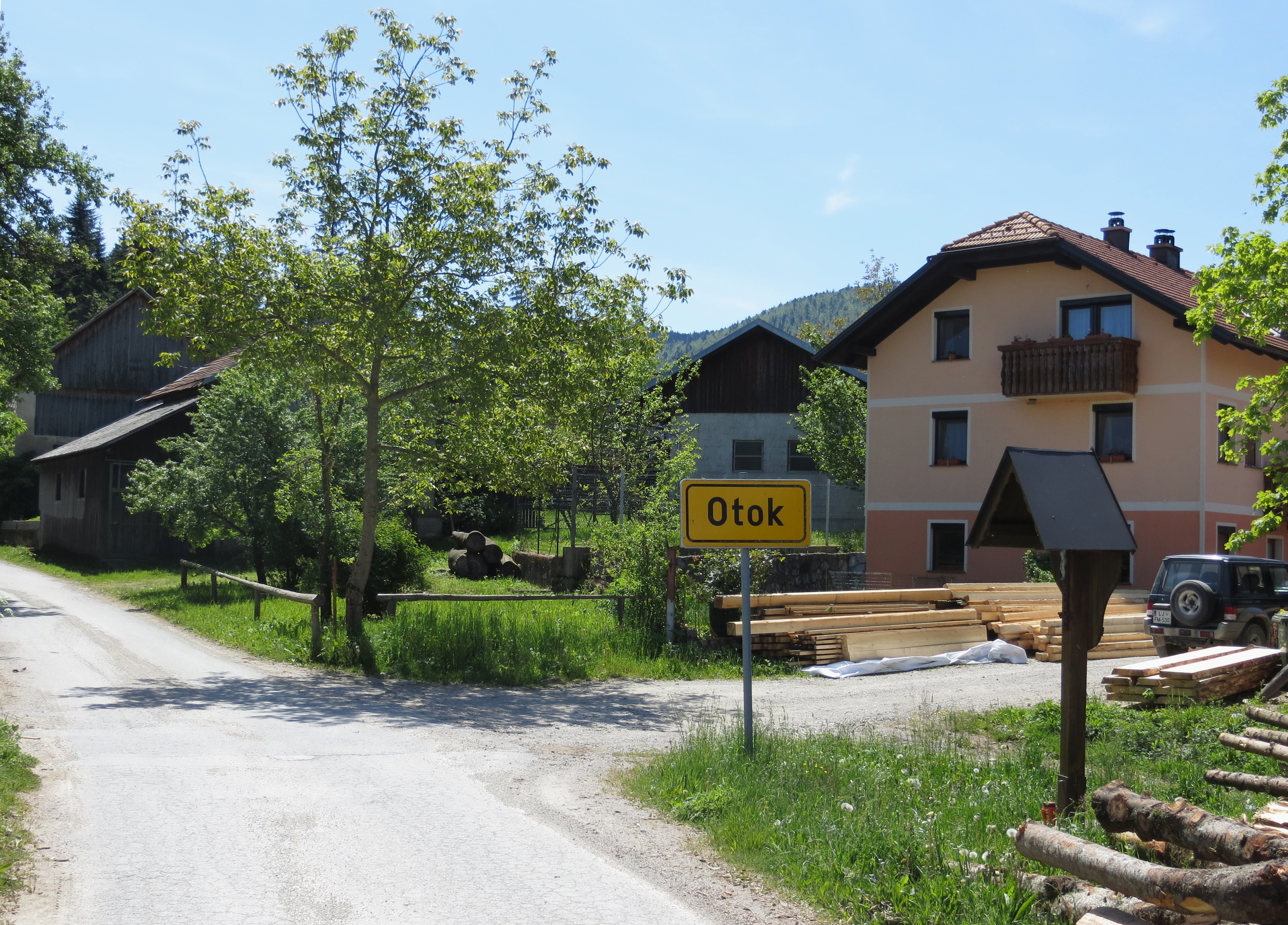

- Location in Slovenia
- Coordinates: 45°44′8″N 14°22′28.53″E
- Country: Slovenia
- Traditional region: Inner Carniola
- Statistical region: Littoral–Inner Carniola
- Municipality: Cerknica

Area
  - Total: 22.67 km^{2} (8.75 sq mi)
- Elevation: 559.2 m (1,835 ft)

Population (2020)
  - Total: 18
  - Density: 0.79/km^{2} (2.1/sq mi)

Otok (pronounced [ˈɔːtɔk]) is a settlement on the southeastern shore of Lake Cerknica south of the town of Cerknica in the Inner Carniola region of Slovenia.

== Church ==
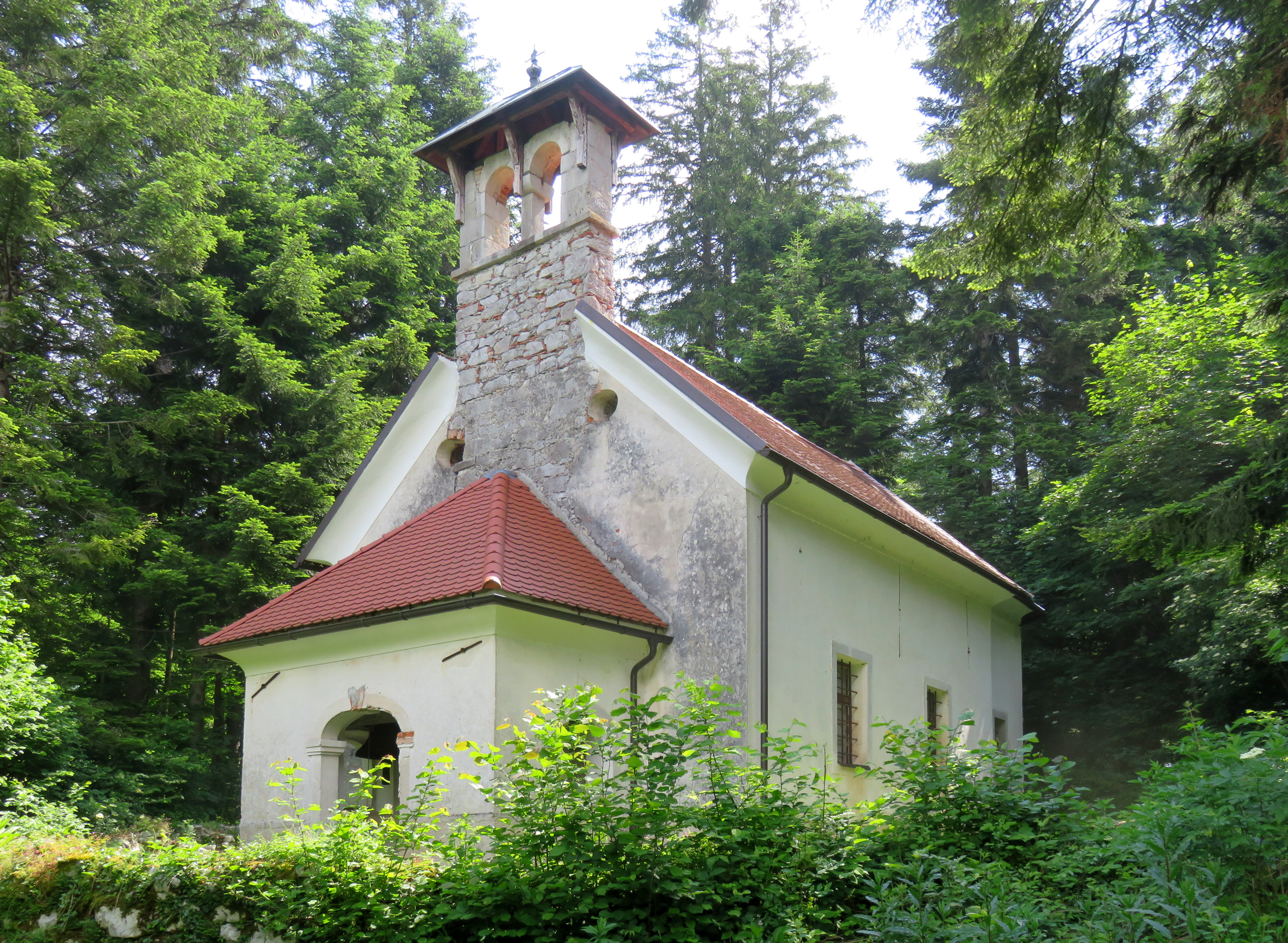
Saints Primus and Felician Church

The church in Otok is dedicated to Saints Primus and Felician. It was first mentioned in written documents in 1526 and was remodeled in the 17th century. The church consists of an entry portico, a rectangular nave with a bell gable, and a small octagonal chancel walled on three sides. The church is surrounded by a low wall. The church stands on a rise east of the village in the southern part of the Cerknica Karst Field.
