= Obolno =

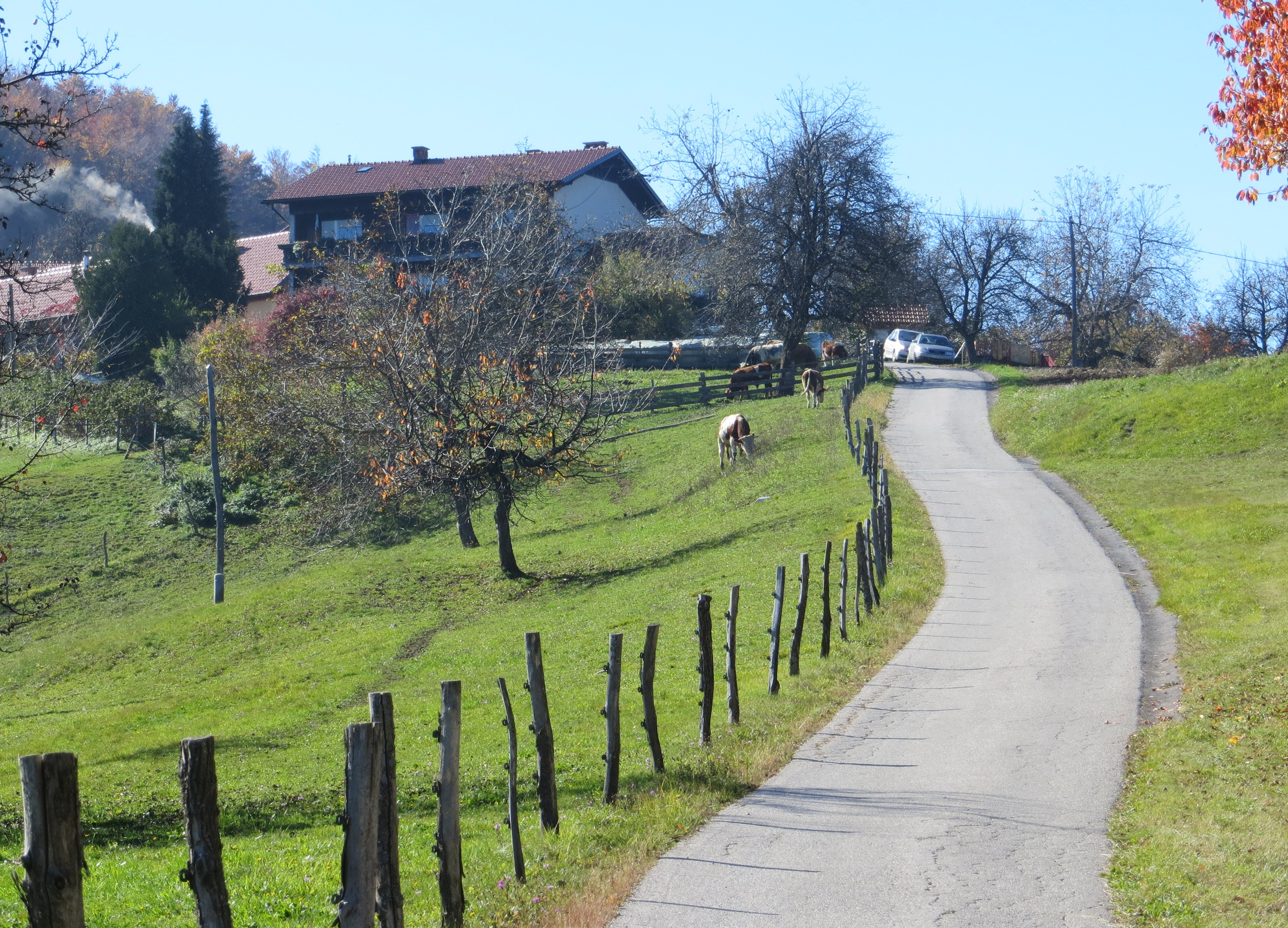

- Location in Slovenia
- Coordinates: 46°0′17.05″N 14°46′48.84″E
- Country: Slovenia
- Traditional region: Lower Carniola
- Statistical region: Central Slovenia
- Municipality: Ivančna Gorica

Area
  - Total: 1.54 km^{2} (0.59 sq mi)
- Elevation: 714.3 m (2,344 ft)

Population (2002)
  - Total: 8

Obolno (pronounced [ɔˈboːu̯nɔ], German: Obounu or Obunu) is a small dispersed settlement in the hills north of Stična in the Municipality of Ivančna Gorica in central Slovenia. The area is part of the historical region of Lower Carniola. The municipality is now included in the Central Slovenia Statistical Region.

== Name ==
The name Obolno follows an adjectival declension (gen Obolnega, loc na Obolnem). It is believed to derive from Common Slavic *abolьnъ 'apple', referring to the local vegetation. In the local dialect, the name is pronounced abau̯nə̏ (gen abúnəga, loc na abúnəm).

== Cultural heritage ==
A small roadside chapel-shrine in the settlement dates to the early 20th century.
