= Otovec =

Village in southern Slovenia

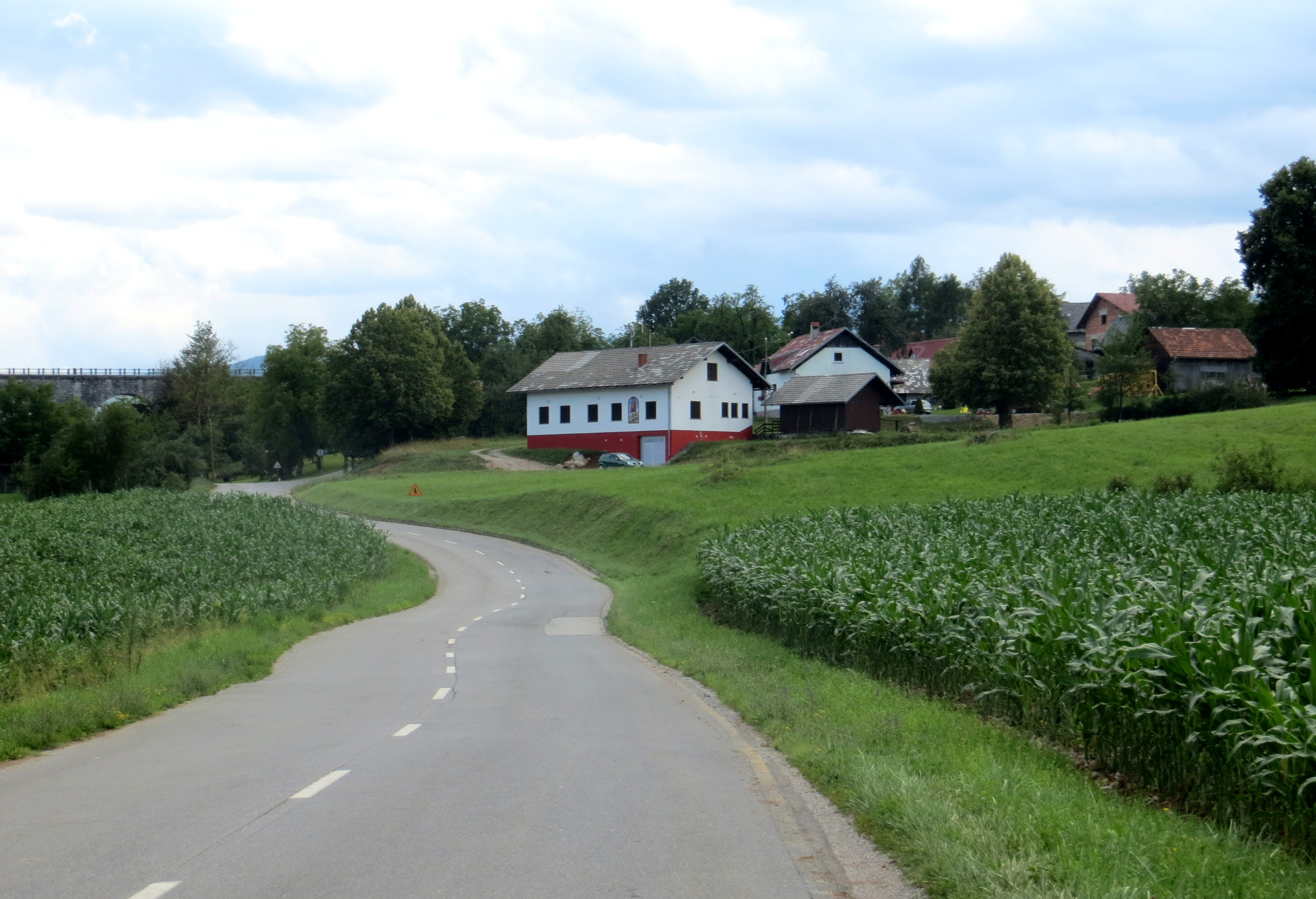

- Location in Slovenia
- Coordinates: 45°35′31.82″N 15°9′53.3″E
- Country: Slovenia
- Traditional region: White Carniola
- Statistical region: Southeast Slovenia
- Municipality: Črnomelj

Area
  - Total: 0.47 km^{2} (0.18 sq mi)
- Elevation: 181.4 m (595 ft)

Population (2020)
  - Total: 49
  - Density: 100/km^{2} (270/sq mi)
- Postal code: 8340

Otovec (pronounced [ˈoːtɔʋəts]; German: Otawitz) is a settlement northwest of the town of Črnomelj in the White Carniola area of southeastern Slovenia. The area is part of the traditional region of Lower Carniola and is now included in the Southeast Slovenia Statistical Region.

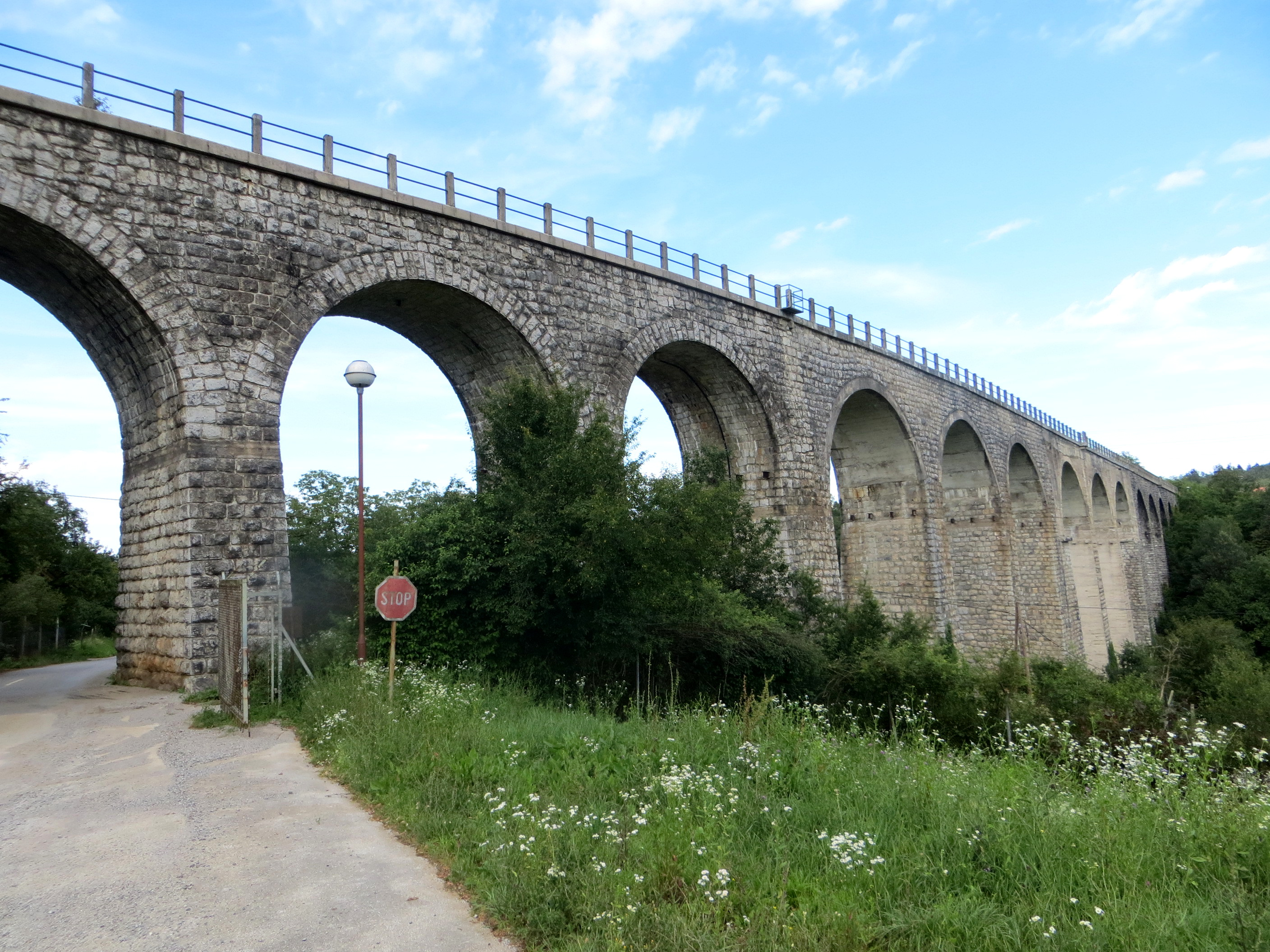
Railroad viaduct

A stone railroad viaduct with fifteen arches on high columns stands in the southern part of the settlement. The viaduct was built in 1914 and damaged during the Second World War. It was repaired after the war.

The local church stands north of the settlement in Sela pri Otovcu.
