= Obrše =

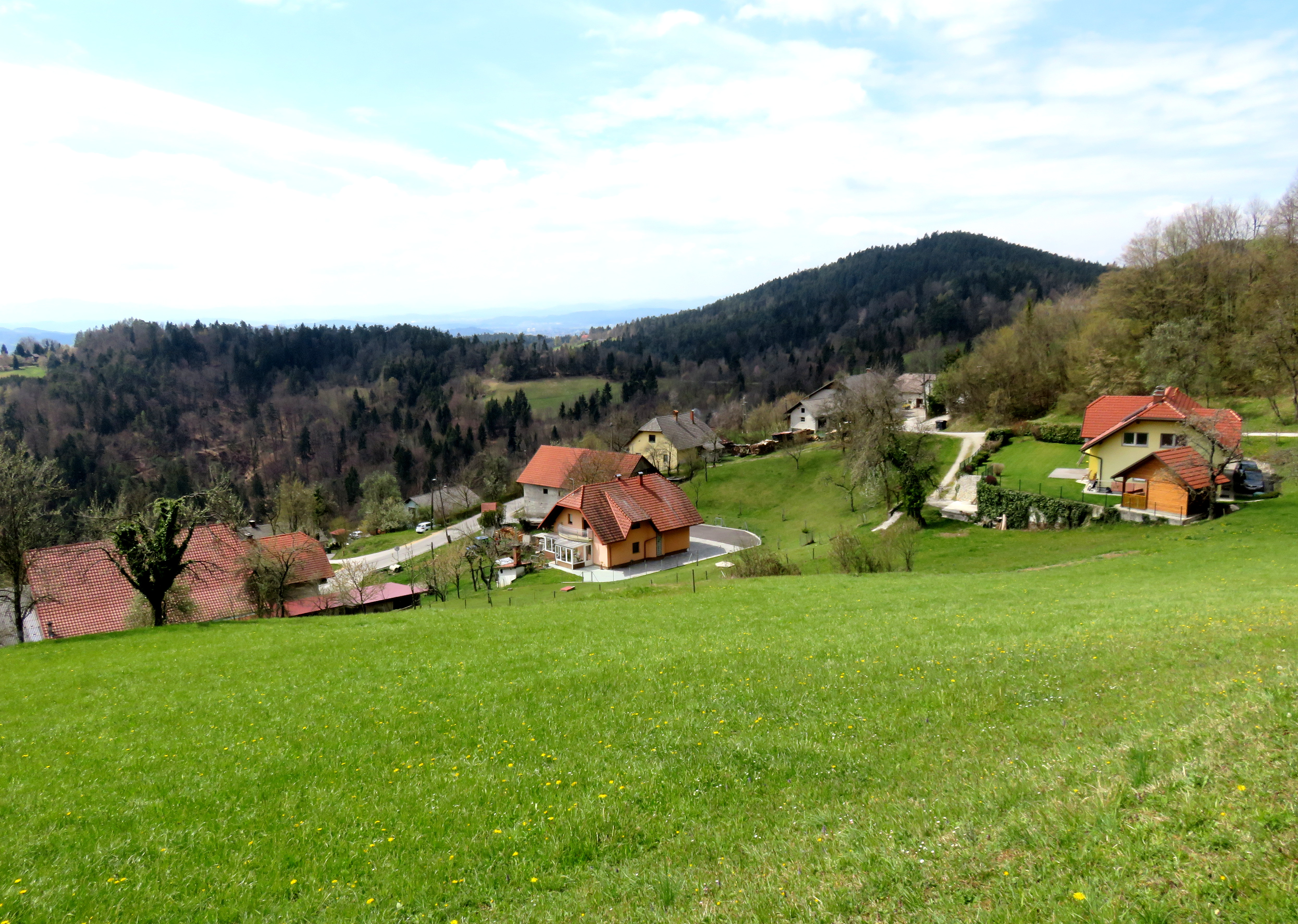

- Location in Slovenia
- Coordinates: 46°11′33.72″N 14°42′6.33″E
- Country: Slovenia
- Traditional region: Upper Carniola
- Statistical region: Central Slovenia
- Municipality: Lukovica

Area
  - Total: 0.75 km^{2} (0.29 sq mi)
- Elevation: 554.8 m (1,820 ft)

Population (2002)
  - Total: 25

Obrše (pronounced [ɔˈbəɾʃɛ]) is a small settlement north of Lukovica pri Domžalah in the eastern part of the Upper Carniola region of Slovenia.
