= Ostrožno pri Ponikvi =

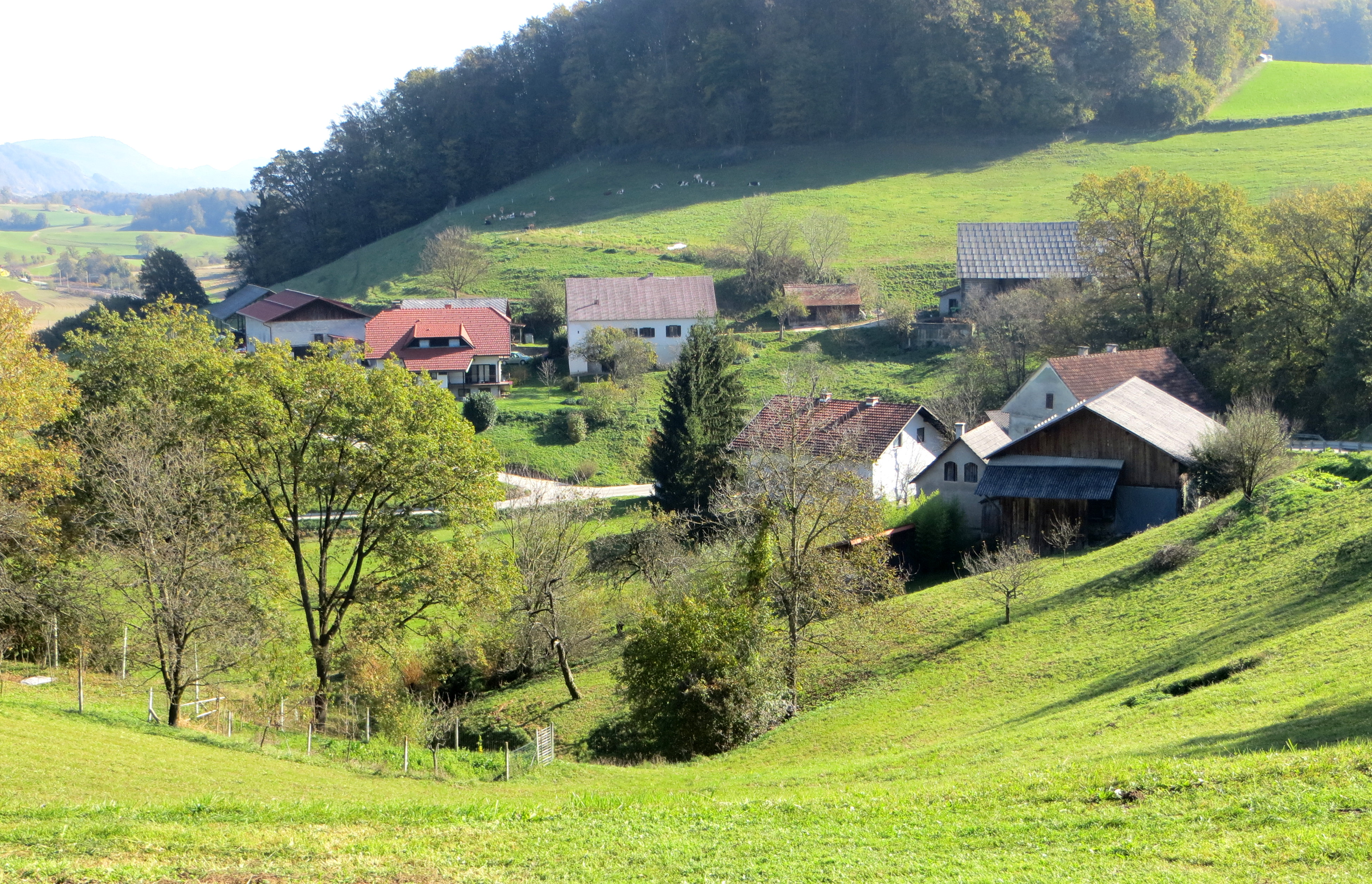

- Location in Slovenia
- Coordinates: 46°15′52.27″N 15°28′30.7″E
- Country: Slovenia
- Traditional region: Styria
- Statistical region: Savinja
- Municipality: Šentjur

Area
  - Total: 2.98 km^{2} (1.15 sq mi)
- Elevation: 333 m (1,093 ft)

Population (2020)
  - Total: 136
  - Density: 45.6/km^{2} (118/sq mi)

Ostrožno pri Ponikvi (pronounced [ɔˈstɾoːʒnɔ pɾi ˈpoːnikʋi]) is a settlement northeast of Ponikva in the Municipality of Šentjur, eastern Slovenia. The settlement, and the entire municipality, are included in the Savinja Statistical Region, which is in the Slovenian portion of the historical Duchy of Styria.

== Name ==
Together with Ostrožno pri Ločah, this constituted a single settlement named Ostrožno until 1953. Ostrožno was split into two parts in 1953, and the part in the Municipality of Šentjur was renamed Ostrožno pri Ponikvi.
