= Osredek pri Trški Gori =

Osredek pri Trški Gori Osredek (until 1955)
- Location in Slovenia
- Coordinates: 45°57′40.23″N 15°27′43.68″E
- Country: Slovenia
- Traditional region: Lower Carniola
- Statistical region: Lower Sava
- Municipality: Krško

Area
  - Total: 0.61 km^{2} (0.24 sq mi)
- Elevation: 352.4 m (1,156 ft)

Population (2002)
  - Total: 23
- Postal code: 8270

Osredek pri Trški Gori (pronounced [ɔˈsɾeːdək pɾi ˈtəɾʃki ˈɡɔːɾi]) is a small settlement in the hills above the right bank of the Sava River, beyond Trška Gora in the Municipality of Krško in eastern Slovenia. The area is part of the traditional region of Lower Carniola. It is now included with the rest of the municipality in the Lower Sava Statistical Region.

== Name ==
The name of the settlement was changed from Osredek to Osredek pri Trški Gori in 1955.
