= Orehovci =

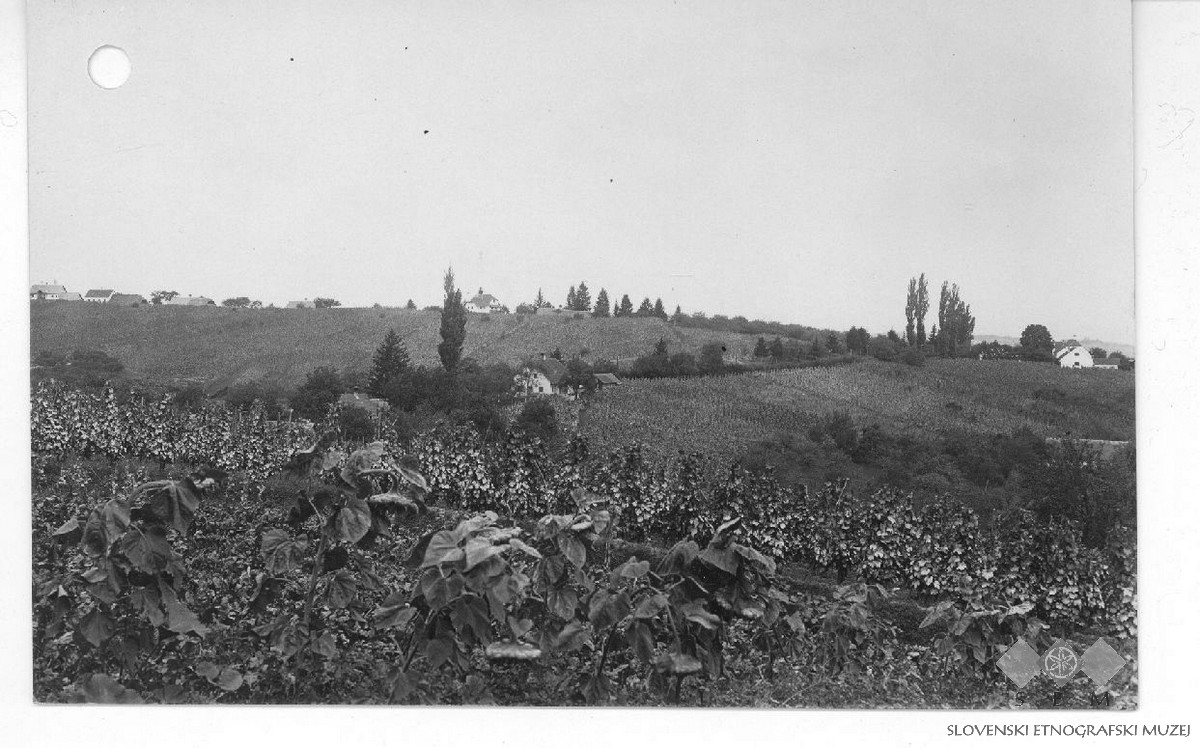
- Postcard of Orehovci

- Location in Slovenia
- Coordinates: 46°38′41.08″N 16°0′6.64″E
- Country: Slovenia
- Traditional region: Styria
- Statistical region: Mura
- Municipality: Gornja Radgona

Area
  - Total: 1.36 km^{2} (0.53 sq mi)
- Elevation: 227.2 m (745 ft)

Population (2020)
  - Total: 67
  - Density: 49/km^{2} (130/sq mi)

Orehovci (pronounced [ɔˈɾeːxɔu̯tsi]) is a settlement in the hills west of Radenci in northeastern Slovenia. It lies in the territory of the Municipality of Gornja Radgona.
