= Osredek pri Dobrovi =

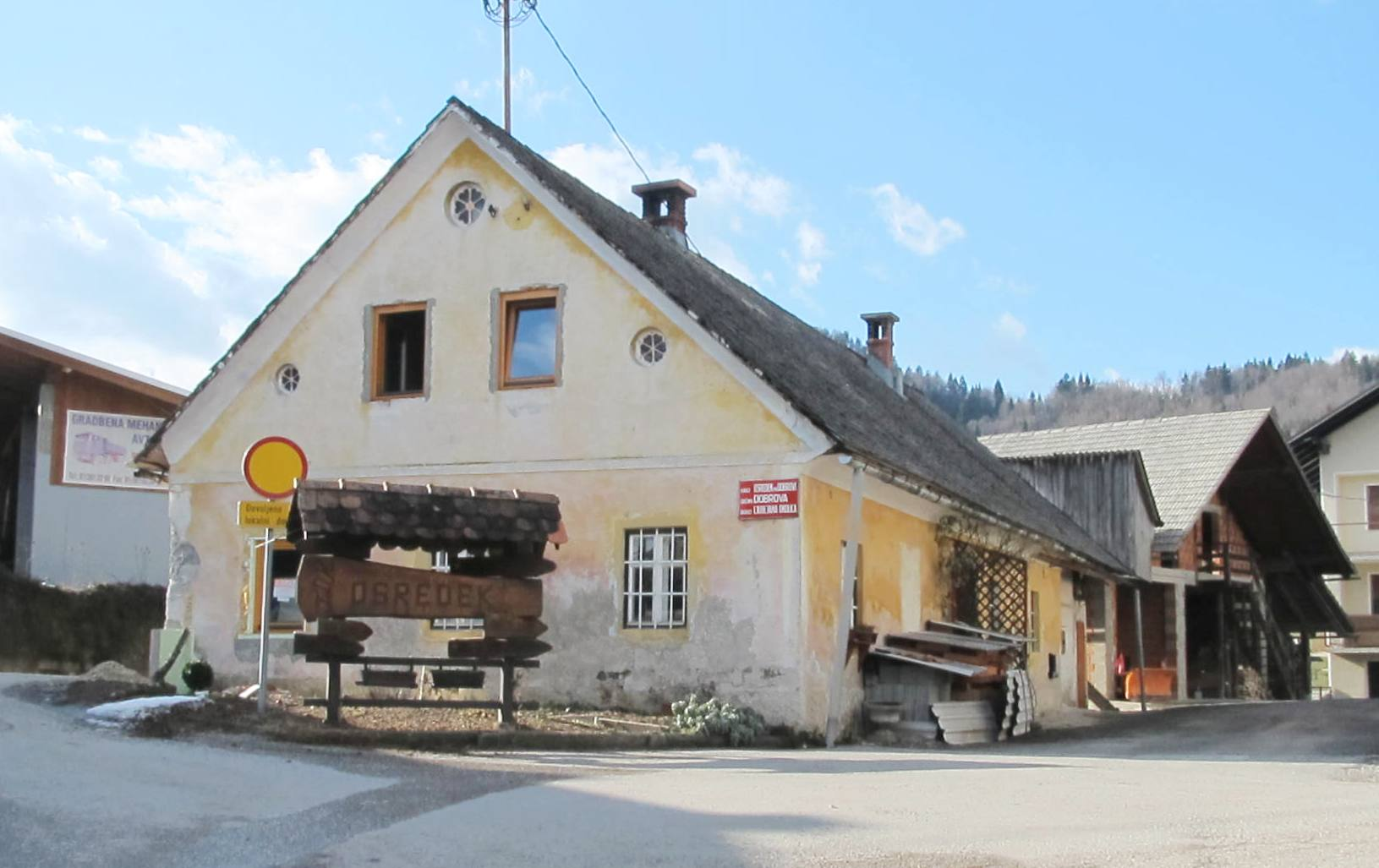

- Location in Slovenia
- Coordinates: 46°5′3.54″N 14°22′30.25″E
- Country: Slovenia
- Traditional region: Upper Carniola
- Statistical region: Central Slovenia
- Municipality: Dobrova–Polhov Gradec

Area
  - Total: 1.61 km^{2} (0.62 sq mi)
- Elevation: 506.6 m (1,662 ft)

Population (2020)
  - Total: 82
  - Density: 51/km^{2} (130/sq mi)

Osredek pri Dobrovi (pronounced [ɔˈsɾeːdɛk pɾi ˈdoːbɾɔʋi]) is a village in the hills northwest of Dobrova in the Municipality of Dobrova–Polhov Gradec in the Upper Carniola region of Slovenia.

== Name ==
The name of the settlement was changed from Osredek to Osredek pri Dobrovi in 1953. The name Osredek pri Dobrovi literally means 'Osredek near Dobrova'. The name Osredek is shared with several other settlements in Slovenia and is derived from the Slovene word osredek 'center', variously referring to an island, a space between two hills, a grove in the middle of a hay field, or a rise in the middle of a flat area. In the past it was known as Osredeck in German.
