= Ostrožno pri Ločah =

- Location in Slovenia
- Coordinates: 46°17′12.85″N 15°28′46.82″E
- Country: Slovenia
- Traditional region: Styria
- Statistical region: Savinja
- Municipality: Slovenske Konjice

Area
  - Total: 0.94 km^{2} (0.36 sq mi)
- Elevation: 417.4 m (1,369 ft)

Population (2002)
  - Total: 20

Ostrožno pri Ločah (pronounced [ɔˈstɾoːʒnɔ pɾi ˈloːtʃax]) is a small dispersed settlement in the hills south of Loče in the Municipality of Slovenske Konjice in eastern Slovenia. It lies on the left bank of the Dravinja River. The area is part of the traditional region of Styria. The municipality is now included in the Savinja Statistical Region.

== Name ==
Together with Ostrožno pri Ponikvi, this constituted a single settlement named Ostrožno until 1953. Ostrožno was split into two parts in 1953, and the part in the Municipality of Slovenske Konjice was renamed Ostrožno pri Ločah.
