= Osredek, Zagorje ob Savi =

Osredek
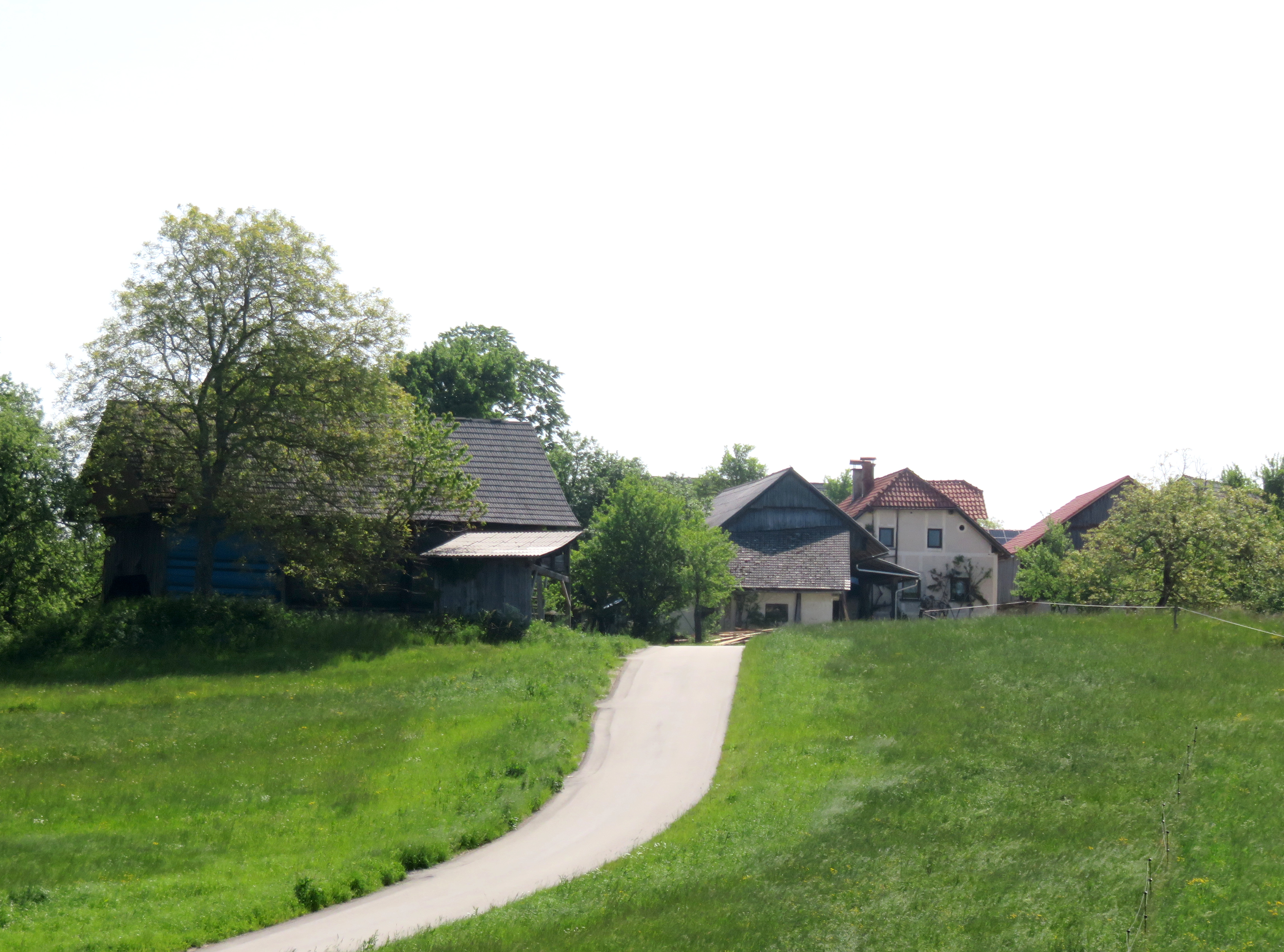

- Location in Slovenia
- Coordinates: 46°3′17.25″N 15°0′22.32″E
- Country: Slovenia
- Traditional region: Lower Carniola
- Statistical region: Central Sava
- Municipality: Zagorje ob Savi

Area
  - Total: 2.41 km^{2} (0.93 sq mi)
- Elevation: 748.9 m (2,457 ft)

Population (2002)
  - Total: 30
- Postal code: 1414

Osredek (pronounced [ɔˈsɾeːdək]) is a settlement in the Municipality of Zagorje ob Savi in central Slovenia. It is divided into three hamlets: Zgornji Osredek, Srednji Osredek, and Spodnji Osredek (literally, upper, middle, and lower Osredek). The area is part of the traditional region of Lower Carniola. It is now included with the rest of the municipality in the Central Sava Statistical Region.
