= Občine, Trebnje =

Občine
- Location in Slovenia
- Coordinates: 45°54′34.42″N 14°57′23.59″E
- Country: Slovenia
- Traditional region: Lower Carniola
- Statistical region: Southeast Slovenia
- Municipality: Trebnje

Area
  - Total: 0.43 km^{2} (0.17 sq mi)
- Elevation: 341.1 m (1,119 ft)

Population (2002)
  - Total: 19

Občine (pronounced [ˈoːptʃinɛ]) is a small settlement in the Municipality of Trebnje in eastern Slovenia. It lies west of Trebnje, just south of the A2 motorway on the regional road to Dobrnič. The area is part of the historical region of Lower Carniola. The municipality is now included in the Southeast Slovenia Statistical Region.
