= Osredek nad Stično =

Osredek nad Stično Osredek (until 1955)
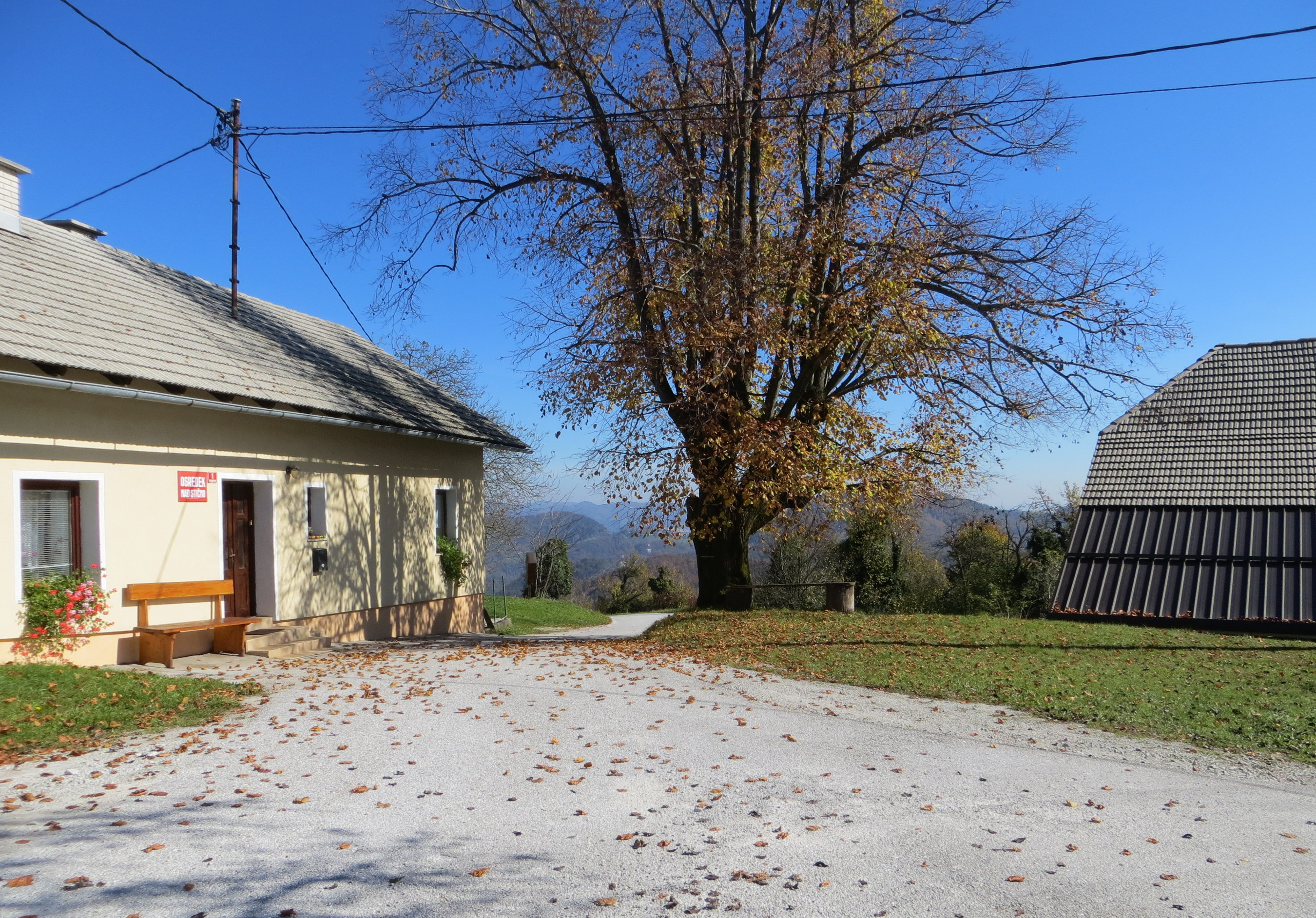

- Location in Slovenia
- Coordinates: 46°0′10.67″N 14°47′38.6″E
- Country: Slovenia
- Traditional region: Lower Carniola
- Statistical region: Central Slovenia
- Municipality: Ivančna Gorica

Area
  - Total: 1.57 km^{2} (0.61 sq mi)
- Elevation: 665.2 m (2,182 ft)

Population (2022)
  - Total: 10

Osredek nad Stično (pronounced [ɔˈsɾeːdək nat ˈstiːtʃnɔ]) is a small settlement in the Municipality of Ivančna Gorica in central Slovenia. It lies in the hills north of Stična in the historical region of Lower Carniola. The municipality is now included in the Central Slovenia Statistical Region.

== Name ==
The name of the settlement was changed from Osredek to Osredek nad Stično in 1955.
