= Osredek, Šentjur =

Osredek
- Location in Slovenia
- Coordinates: 46°10′28.06″N 15°22′37.74″E
- Country: Slovenia
- Traditional region: Styria
- Statistical region: Savinja
- Municipality: Šentjur

Area
  - Total: 1.4 km^{2} (0.54 sq mi)
- Elevation: 349.2 m (1,146 ft)

Population (2020)
  - Total: 84
  - Density: 60/km^{2} (160/sq mi)

Osredek (pronounced [ɔˈsɾeːdək]) is a small settlement in the Municipality of Šentjur, in eastern Slovenia. The settlement, and the entire municipality, are included in the Savinja Statistical Region, which is in the Slovenian portion of the historical Duchy of Styria.
