= Osredek pri Podsredi =

- Location in Slovenia
- Coordinates: 46°0′55.51″N 15°35′59.06″E
- Country: Slovenia
- Traditional region: Styria
- Statistical region: Savinja
- Municipality: Kozje

Area
  - Total: 9.48 km^{2} (3.66 sq mi)
- Elevation: 470.2 m (1,543 ft)

Population (2002)
  - Total: 79

Osredek pri Podsredi (pronounced [ɔˈsɾeːdək pɾi pɔˈtsɾeːdi]) is a settlement in the Municipality of Kozje in eastern Slovenia. It lies in the hills south and east of Podsreda. The area is part of the historical Styria region. The municipality is now included in the Savinja Statistical Region.

== Name ==
The name of the settlement was changed from Osredek to Osredek pri Podsredi in 1953.

== Cultural heritage ==
On a hill known as Big Peak (Slovene: Veliki vrh) in the eastern part of the settlement, the remains of a prehistoric hillfort have been identified. Judging by finds of coins from the rule of Gallienus and Aurelian, the site was also used in the Roman period, probably as a refuge.
