= Osredek pri Krmelju =

- Location in Slovenia
- Coordinates: 46°2′21.5″N 15°8′35.66″E
- Country: Slovenia
- Traditional region: Lower Carniola
- Statistical region: Lower Sava
- Municipality: Sevnica

Area
  - Total: 4.46 km^{2} (1.72 sq mi)
- Elevation: 468.8 m (1,538 ft)

Population (2002)
  - Total: 123

Osredek pri Krmelju (pronounced [ɔˈsɾeːdək pɾi kəɾˈmeːlju]) is a settlement northwest of Krmelj in the Municipality of Sevnica in central Slovenia. The area is part of the historical region of Lower Carniola. The municipality is now included in the Lower Sava Statistical Region. It includes the hamlets of Rupa, Radvanca, Dobovec, Gabrje, Komatca, Oplaz, Kij, and Prinštal.

== Name ==
The name of the settlement was changed from Osredek to Osredek pri Krmelju in 1953. The hamlet of Prinštal was also known as Primštal (German: Primsthal) in older sources.

== Church ==
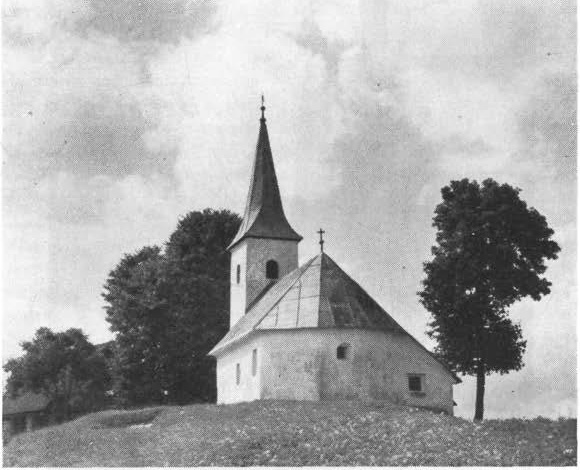
Sts. Primus and Felician Church in Osredek pri Krmelju (1941)

The local church is dedicated to Saints Primus and Felician and belongs to the Parish of Šentjanž. It dates to the 17th century.
