= Osredek, Cerknica =

Osredek
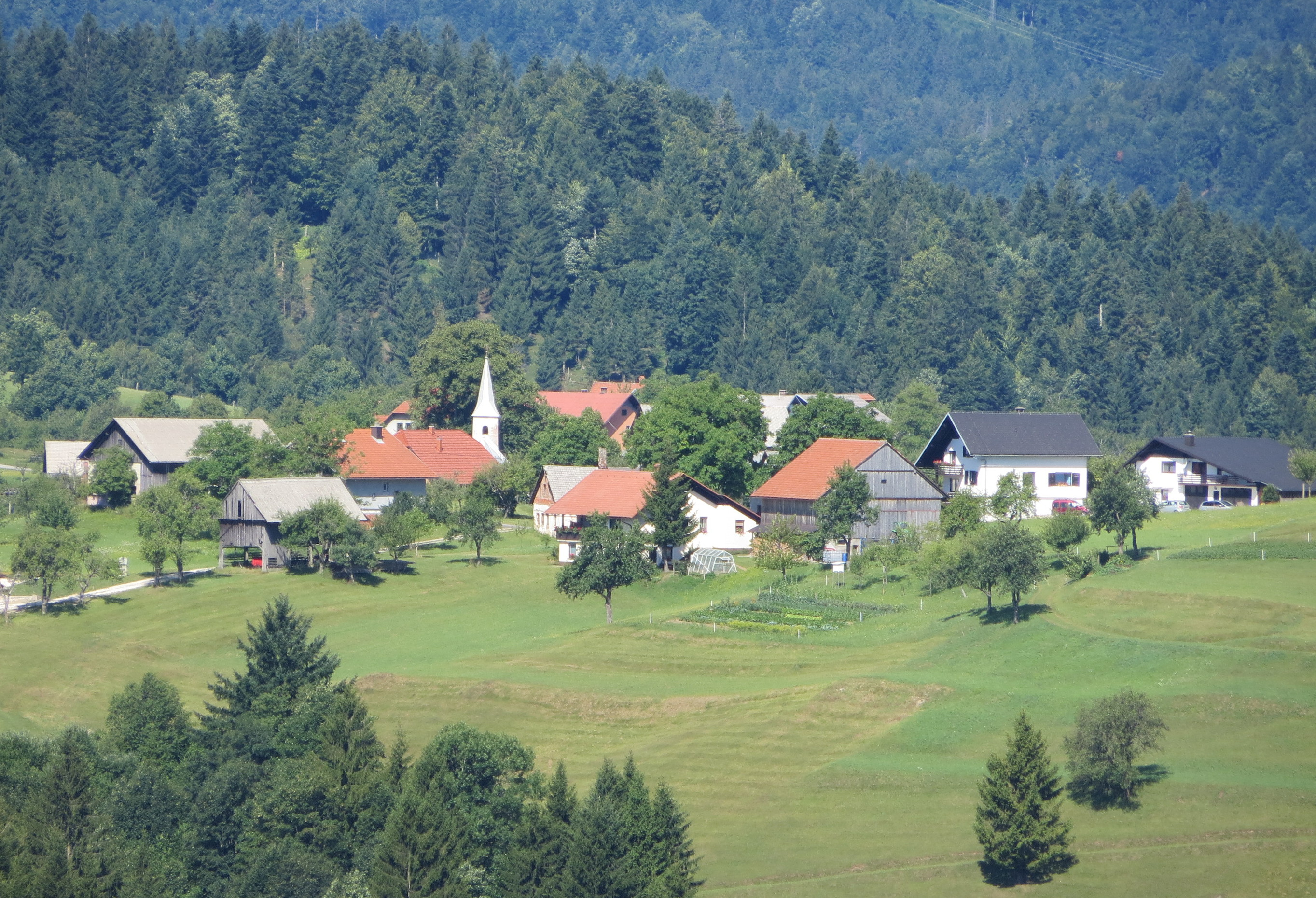

- Location in Slovenia
- Coordinates: 45°51′50.85″N 14°28′49.12″E
- Country: Slovenia
- Traditional region: Inner Carniola
- Statistical region: Littoral–Inner Carniola
- Municipality: Cerknica

Area
  - Total: 5.02 km^{2} (1.94 sq mi)
- Elevation: 753.6 m (2,472 ft)

Population (2020)
  - Total: 54
  - Density: 11/km^{2} (28/sq mi)

Osredek (pronounced [ɔˈsɾeːdək]) is a settlement in the hills northeast of Cerknica in the Inner Carniola region of Slovenia.
