= Orehovec, Kostanjevica na Krki =

Orehovec
- Location in Slovenia
- Coordinates: 45°49′32.33″N 15°25′12.75″E
- Country: Slovenia
- Traditional region: Lower Carniola
- Statistical region: Lower Sava
- Municipality: Kostanjevica na Krki

Area
  - Total: 4.91 km^{2} (1.90 sq mi)
- Elevation: 220.7 m (724 ft)

Population (2002)
  - Total: 229
- Postal code: 8311

Orehovec (pronounced [ɔˈɾeːxɔʋəts]; in older sources also Orehovica, German: Nußdorf) is a village in the Gorjanci Hills in the Municipality of Kostanjevica na Krki in eastern Slovenia. Its territory extends south to the border with Croatia. The area is part of the traditional region of Lower Carniola. It is now included in the Lower Sava Statistical Region.

There is a chapel with a belfry in the settlement. It is dedicated to the Our Lady of the Rosary and was built in the late 19th century.
