= Orehovica, Zagorje ob Savi =

Orehovica
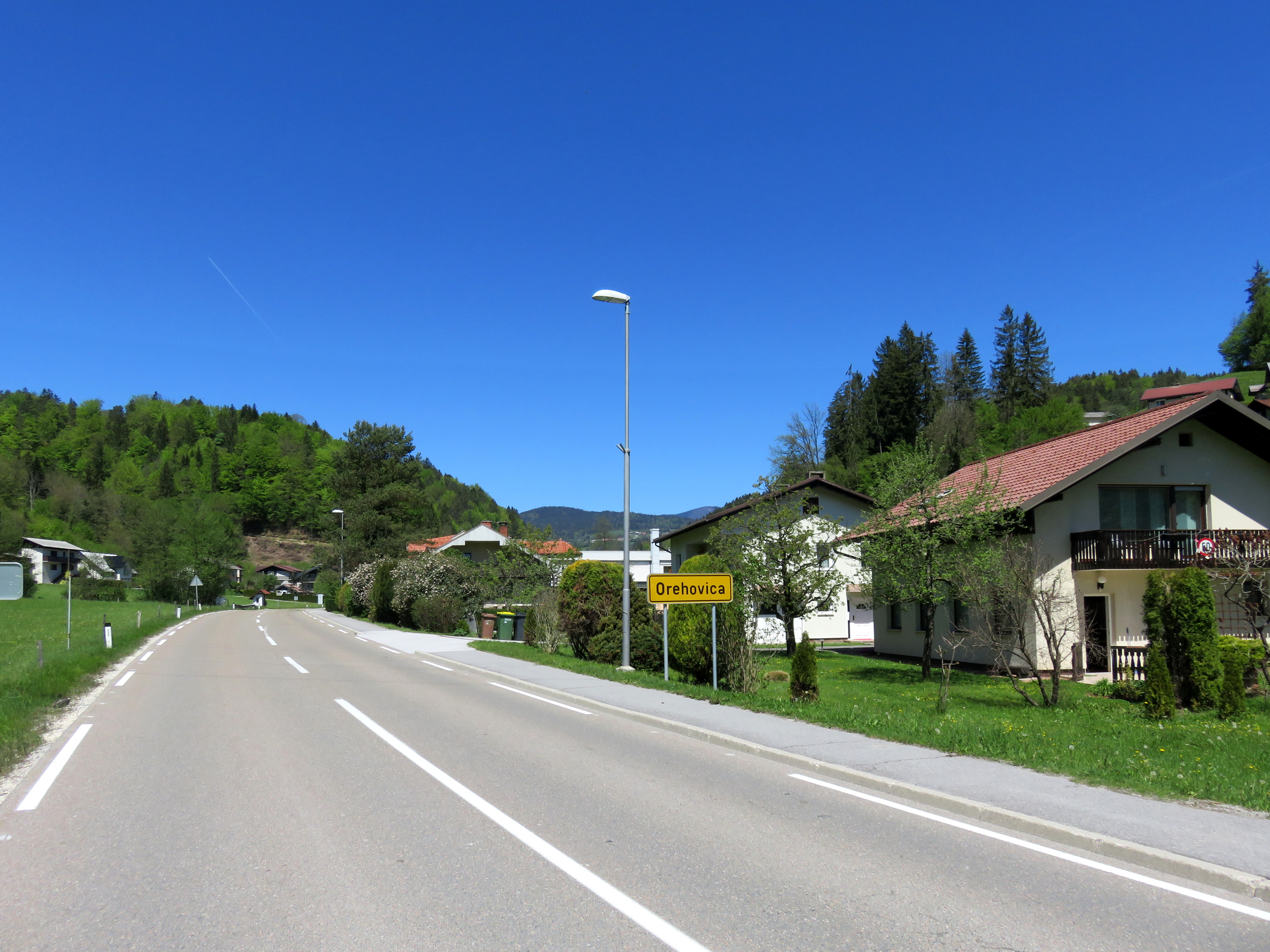

- Location in Slovenia
- Coordinates: 46°9′54.58″N 14°54′54.19″E
- Country: Slovenia
- Traditional region: Upper Carniola
- Statistical region: Central Sava
- Municipality: Zagorje ob Savi

Area
  - Total: 0.80 km^{2} (0.31 sq mi)
- Elevation: 335.9 m (1,102 ft)

Population (2002)
  - Total: 121
- Postal code: 1411

Orehovica (pronounced [ɔˈɾeːxɔʋitsa]) is a settlement in the Municipality of Zagorje ob Savi in central Slovenia. It lies on the main road from Izlake to Trojane. The area is part of the traditional region of Upper Carniola. It is now included with the rest of the municipality in the Central Sava Statistical Region.
