= Orešje, Šmarješke Toplice =

Orešje
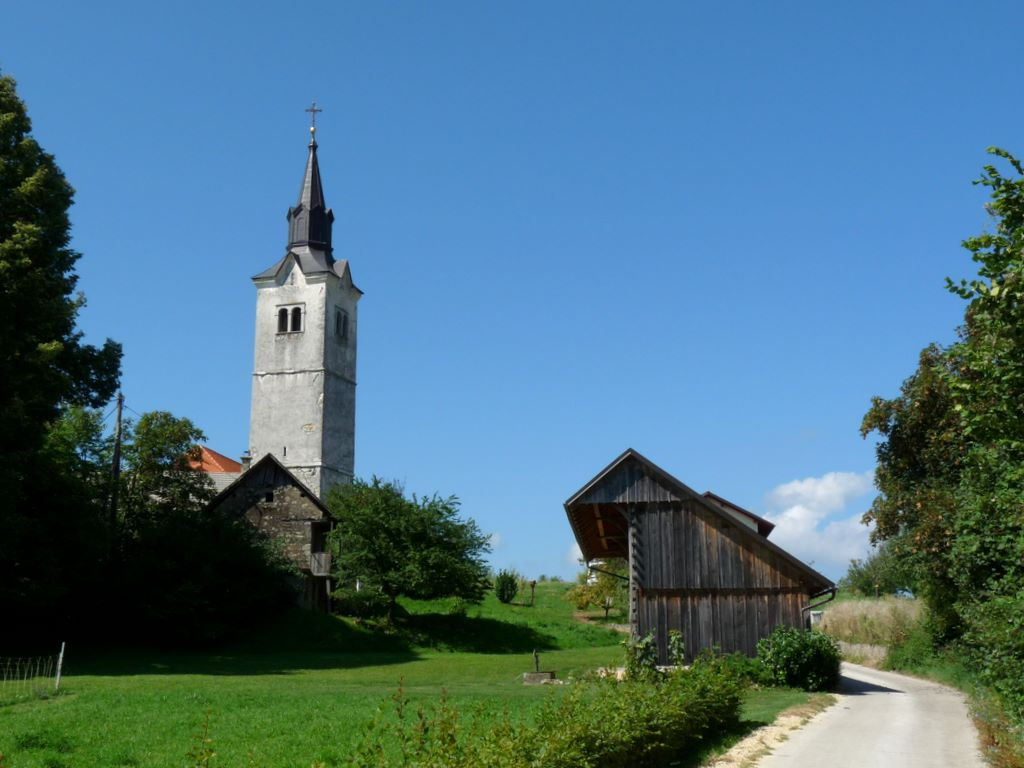

- Location in Slovenia
- Coordinates: 45°53′11.66″N 15°16′7.07″E
- Country: Slovenia
- Traditional region: Lower Carniola
- Statistical region: Southeast Slovenia
- Municipality: Šmarješke Toplice

Area
  - Total: 1.73 km^{2} (0.67 sq mi)
- Elevation: 269.2 m (883 ft)

Population (2002)
  - Total: 104

Orešje (pronounced [ɔˈɾeːʃjɛ]) is a settlement east of Šmarjeta in the Municipality of Šmarješke Toplice in southeastern Slovenia. The area is part of the historical region of Lower Carniola. The municipality is now included in the Southeast Slovenia Statistical Region.
