= Goričice =

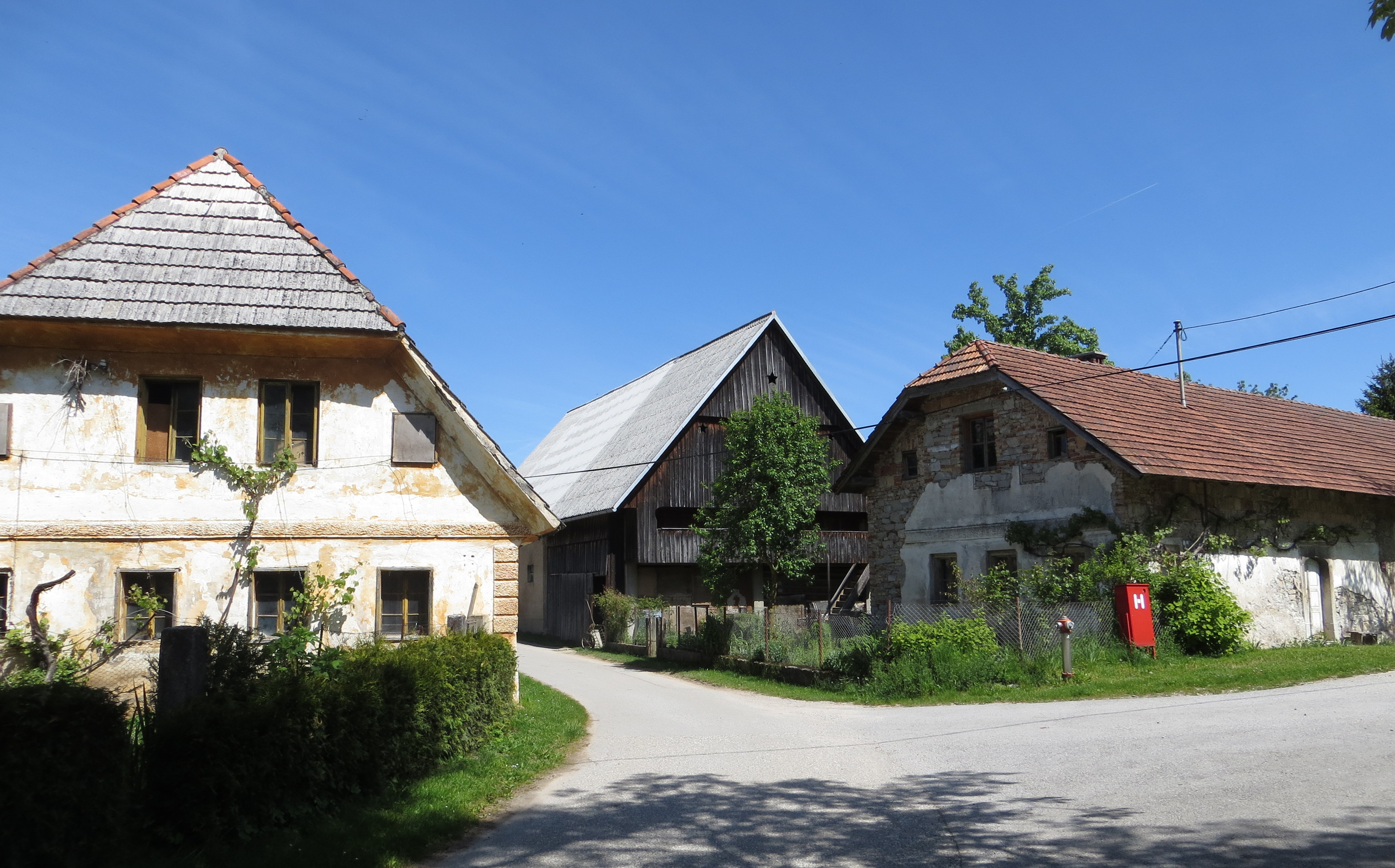

- Location in Slovenia
- Coordinates: 45°44′6.47″N 14°25′53.01″E
- Country: Slovenia
- Traditional region: Inner Carniola
- Statistical region: Littoral–Inner Carniola
- Municipality: Cerknica

Area
  - Total: 2.74 km^{2} (1.06 sq mi)
- Elevation: 596 m (1,955 ft)

Population (2020)
  - Total: 88
  - Density: 32/km^{2} (83/sq mi)

Goričice (pronounced [ɡɔˈɾiːtʃitsɛ]) is a small village northeast of Gorenje Jezero on the shore of Lake Cerknica in the Municipality of Cerknica in the Inner Carniola region of Slovenia.

== History ==
Goričice was a hamlet of neighboring Lipsenj until 1989, when it was separated and became an independent settlement.

== Gallery ==
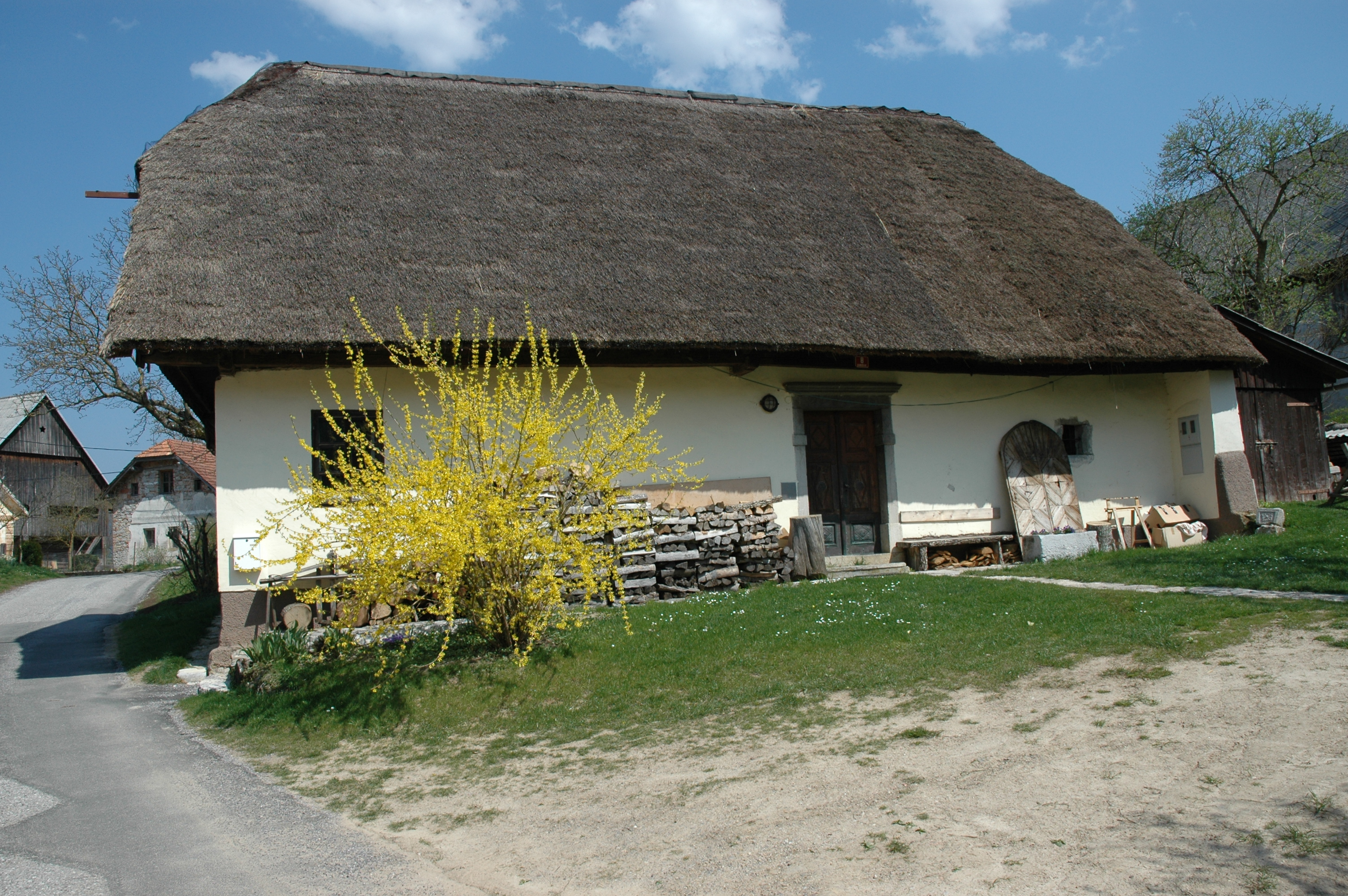
Thatched house in Goričice
