= Šteberk Castle =

Coordinates: 45°44′57″N 14°26′47″E

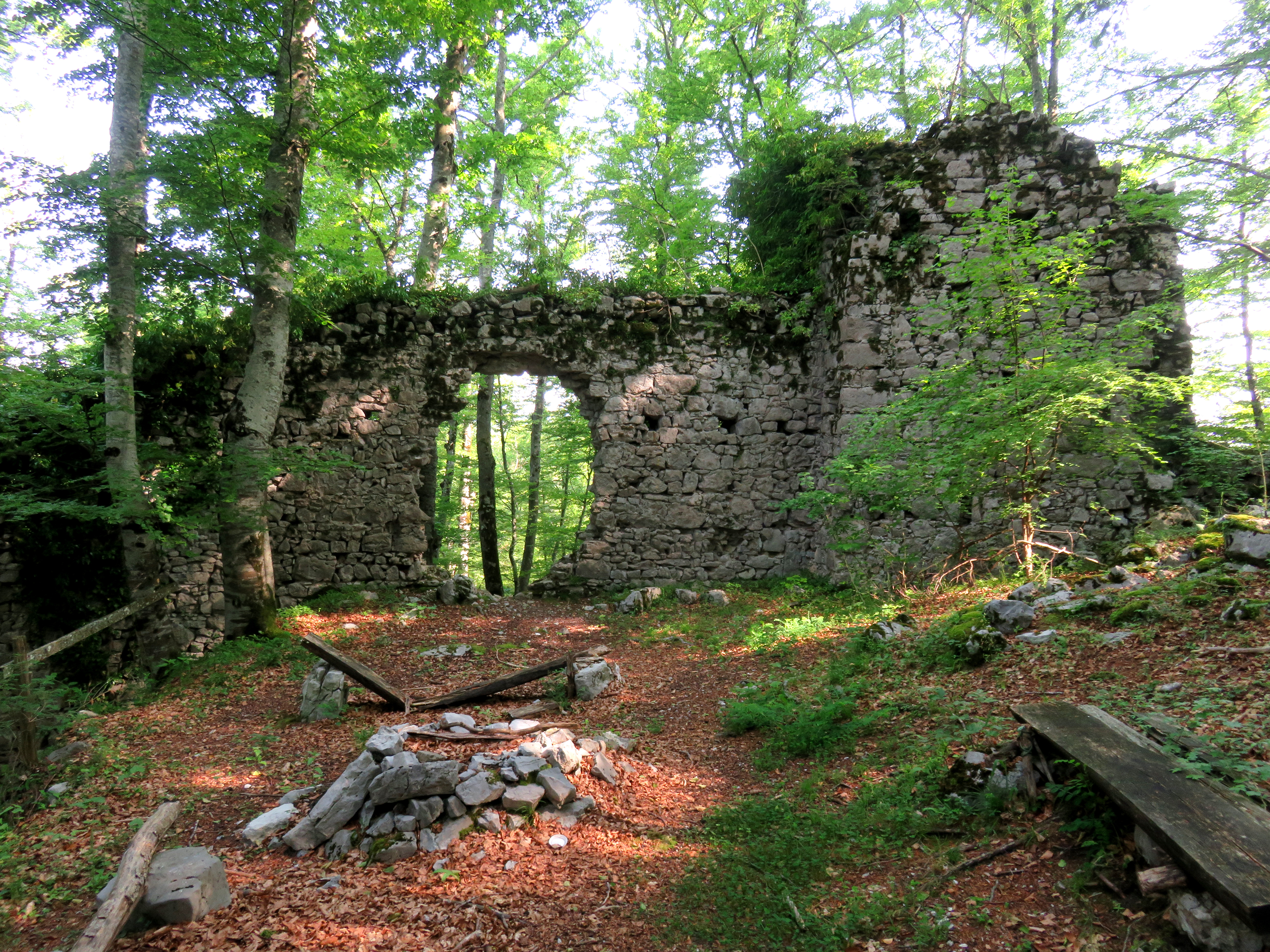
Ruins of Šteberk Castle

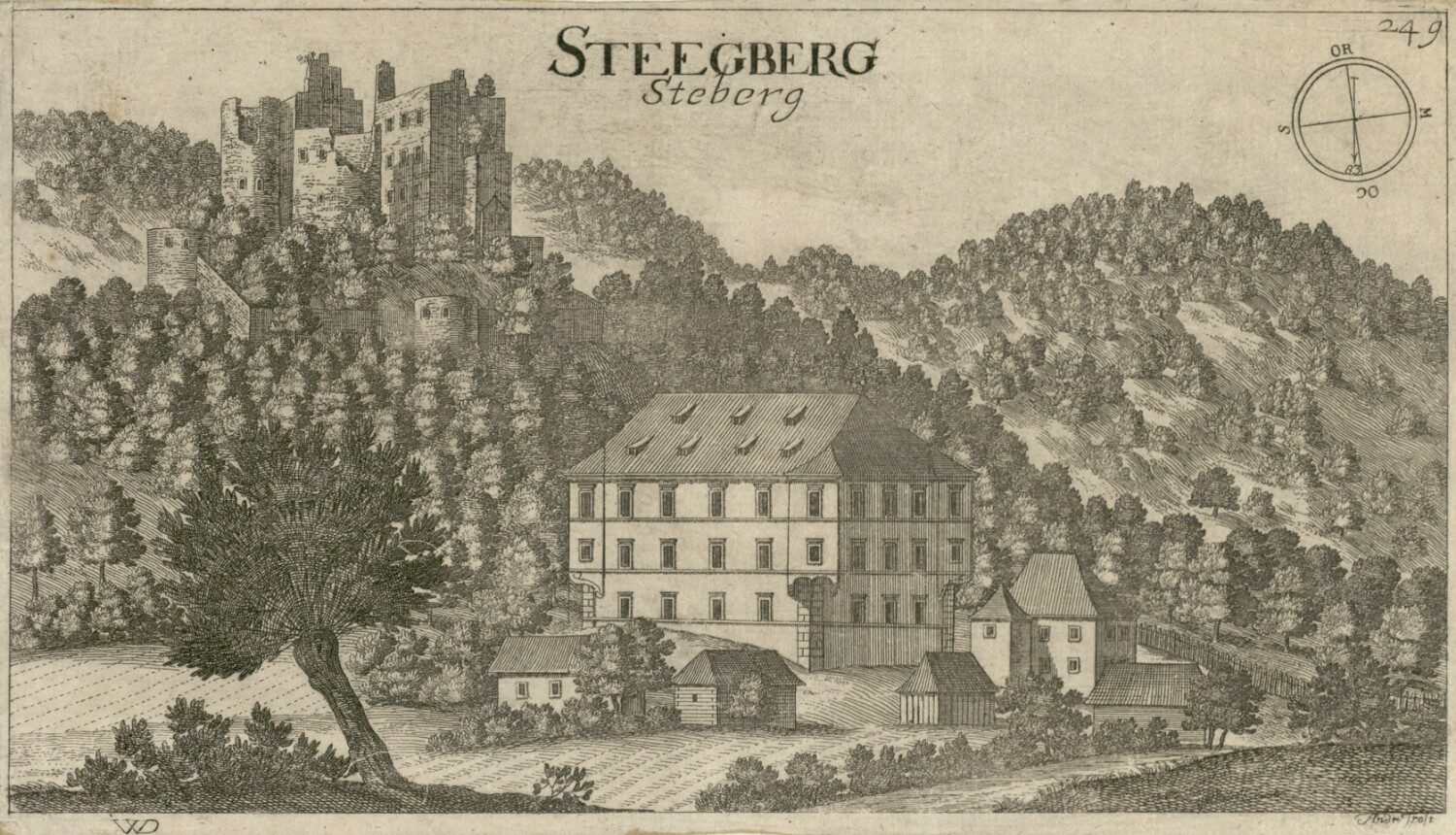
Šteberk Castle (top left) as depicted in 1679 by Johann Weikhard von Valvasor

The ruins of Šteberk Castle (Slovene: Grad Šteberk, also known as Stari grad 'the Old Castle'; German: Stegberg) stand at an elevation of 647 meters (2,123 ft) above the settlement of Podšteberk southeast of Cerknica, Slovenia. The ruins are located in the territory of the village of Žerovnica.

== History ==
The castle was first mentioned in written sources in 1274. The castle fell into ruin by the 15th century or in the earthquake of 1511. In 1635, Prince Johann Anton Eggenberg purchased the Stegberg Estate and built Lower Stegberg Manor from the ruins of the old castle on the site of a former manor and the later castle farm. Count Johann Caspar Cobenzl purchased the manor and the estate from the Eggenbergs in 1761. In 1846, Prince Weriand of Windischgrätz became the owner. The property remained in the possession of his heirs until the end of the Second World War.
