= Lipsenj =

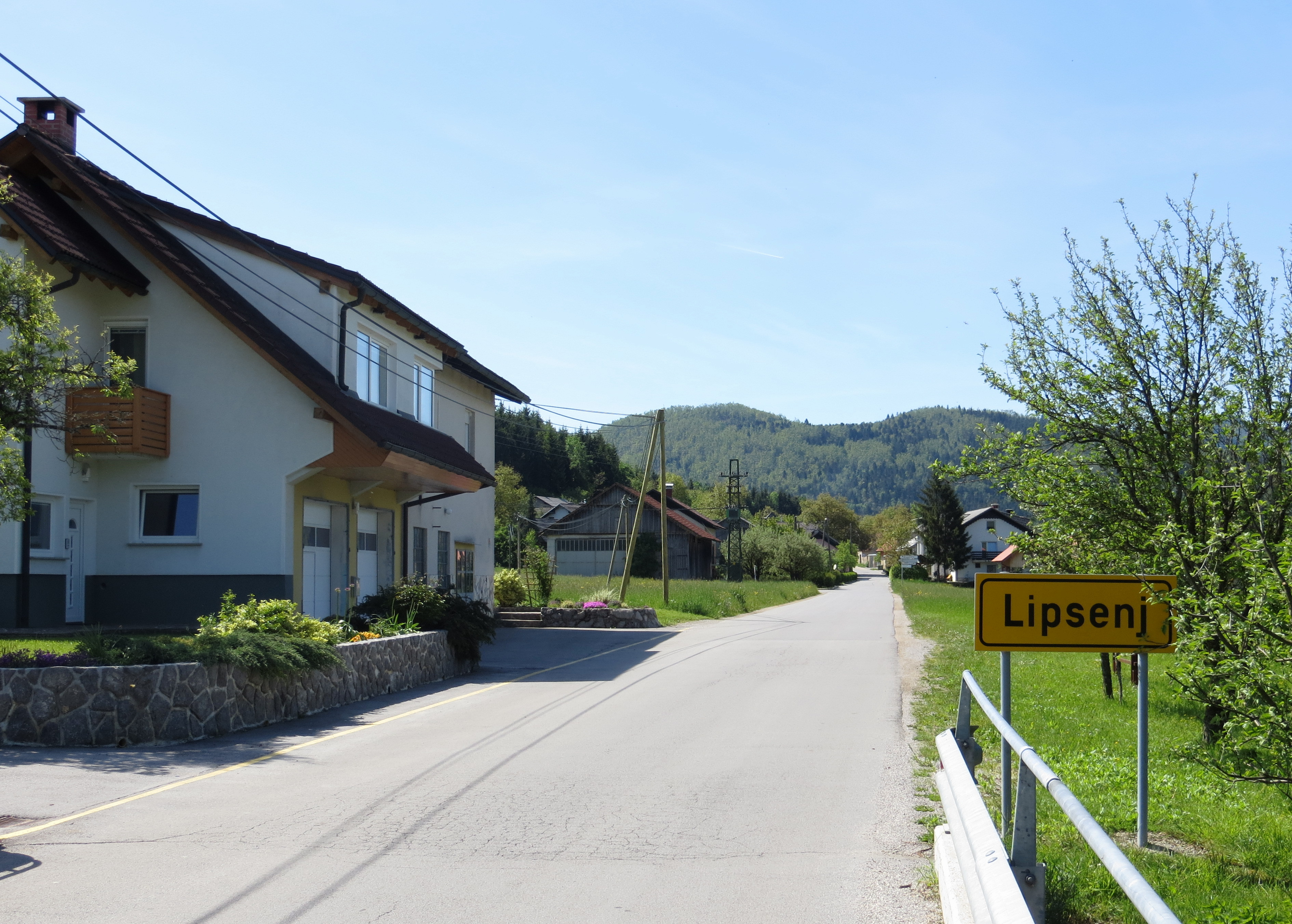

- Location in Slovenia
- Coordinates: 45°44′43.42″N 14°25′56.8″E
- Country: Slovenia
- Traditional region: Inner Carniola
- Statistical region: Littoral–Inner Carniola
- Municipality: Cerknica

Area
  - Total: 2.3 km^{2} (0.89 sq mi)
- Elevation: 654.6 m (2,148 ft)

Population (2020)
  - Total: 126
  - Density: 55/km^{2} (140/sq mi)

Lipsenj (pronounced [liˈpseːn], German: Lipsein) is a small village between Žerovnica and Gorenje Jezero on the eastern edge of Lake Cerknica in the Municipality of Cerknica in the Inner Carniola region of Slovenia.

== Geography ==
In addition to the main settlement, Lipsenj includes the hamlets of Podšteberk (in older sources Štegbrg, German: Stegberg) and Sveti Štefan (German: Sank Stefan).

== Name ==
Lipsenj was attested in written sources in 1425 as Lubssem (and as Lubsen in 1436 and 1497, Lubzin in 1444, Lupsen in 1581, and Lypse in 1589). The medieval attestations of the name indicate that it developed from *Ljupsenj. This may have developed from the unattested hypocorism *Ľubosenъ, referring to some early inhabitant of the place.

== Church ==
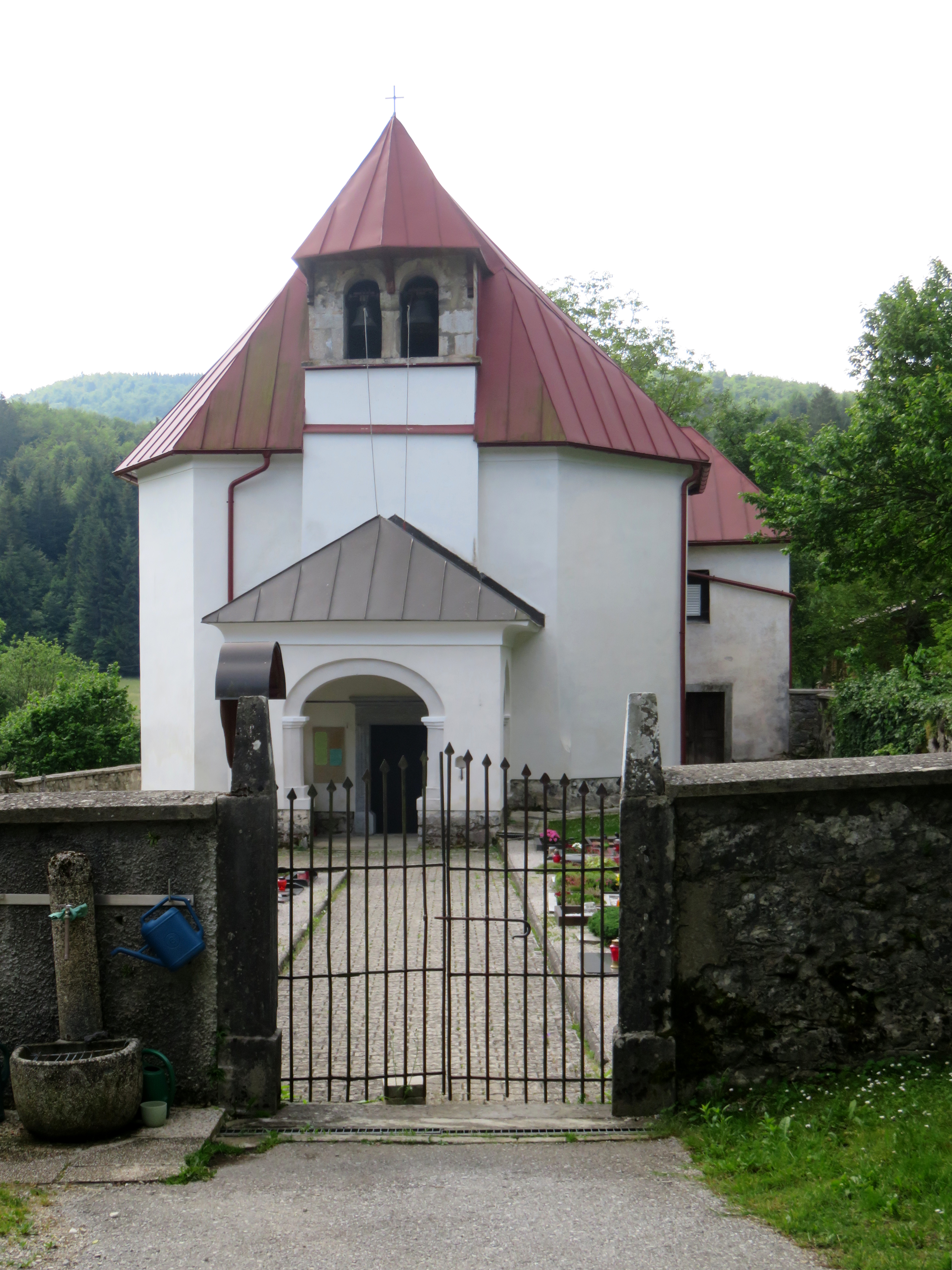
Saint Stephen's Church

The church in Lipsenj, located in the former village of Sveti Štefan, is dedicated to Saint Stephen. It is a chapel of ease and belongs to the Parish of Grahovo. The church was mentioned in written sources in 1526 and it was remodeled in the Baroque style in the 18th century. The church has an attached bell tower, an octagonal nave topped by a cupola, a polygonal chancel walled on three sides, and a sacristy. The interior furnishings of the church are late Baroque. There is a small cemetery next to the church.
