= Antonija Premrov =

Slovenian nurse, organist, choirmistresses, martyr and Servant of God (1912–1949)

- Born: 2 June 1912; Martinjak, Duchy of Carniola (now Slovenia)
- Disappeared: 14 January 1949 (aged 36); Cerknica, SFR Yugoslavia (now Slovenia)
- Died: some days after 14 January 1949 supposedly around Cerknica
- Body discovered: Cerknica
- Occupations: nurse, seamstress, organist, choirmistress
- Title: Servant of God

Antonija Premrov, sister Karmela (2 June 1912 – disappeared 14 January 1949, died some days after) was a Slovenian nurse, organist, and choirmistress. She was martyred by Communists because of her successful work with youth in her parish. She is currently in process of beatification by the Episcopal Conference of Slovenia. Her current title is Servant of God.

== Early life ==
Antonija was born into a devout Slovenian family on 2 June 1914, in Martinjak. Her mother was the farmer Marija Brence (1883–1967), and her father was the farmer Franc Premrov (1874–1948). She had ten brothers and sisters. She received the sacrament of confirmation on June 19, 1921. From a young age, she felt a calling to a consecrated life. In the early 1930s, she entered the convent of the Sisters of Mary of the Miraculous Medal. She trained as a nurse at the Vincentinum Institute in Ljubljana. In addition, she also learned to play the organ.

== Work ==
After completing her studies in 1931, she started to work as a nurse at the sanatorium in the Šlajmer House, which was run by the Sisters of Mary of the Miraculous Medal, where she was employed for sixteen years. In 1947, the communist authorities closed the convent. Antonija Karmela was dismissed from her job at the sanatorium. She returned home to her parents and found work as a seamstress in a sewing workshop in Grahovo. In her free time, she cared for the sick in the surrounding area. At the request of the parish priest of the Cerknica parish, which at the time had no organist, she took on the role of organist and choirmistress. The choir was large and mostly made up of young people. Antonija Karmela was a very popular choirmistress and attracted many young people to participate.

== Threats ==
Antonija's work, which attracted young people, increasingly became a thorn in the side of the communist authorities. On the night of 1 November 1948, local communist activists threw stones at her house in an attempt to intimidate her. At Christmas in 1948, someone hid her sheet music, and when she wanted to play at Mass, it was nowhere to be found. According to testimonies, at the beginning of 1949, a party meeting was held where they discussed what to do about Antonija, who had such a strong influence on the religious life in the area.

== Abduction and death ==
As on every Friday, on 14 January 1949, Antonija Karmela set out for choir practice. That evening, when she arrived from Martinjak to the first houses in Cerknica, she was met by members of the UDBA (Yugoslav secret police), who forced her into a car. After the abduction, she was tortured and raped for several days, then killed and thrown into Lake Cerknica.

== Search ==
From that evening on, all trace of Antonija Premrov disappeared. In the following days, her fellow villagers wondered where she could be. Two rumors began to circulate: either she had fled across the border, which those who knew her did not believe, or she had been murdered. Her relatives believed she was being held by the UDBA in Postojna. They even brought clothes there for her, but were told she was not there and that she had emigrated to Trieste. The police in Cerknica also claimed to know nothing about her disappearance.

Despite the efforts of her sister, Marija Premrov, Sister Božidara, a nurse at the oncology institute, who used her connections to try to find out what had happened to Antonija, no information came to light. With the help of a lawyer, Marija Božidara wrote a letter and sent it on 31 May 1950, to Tito's office in Belgrade. Belgrade immediately contacted the UDBA in Postojna. From there, they summoned and interrogated Antonija's 67-year-old mother, the farmer Marija Brence. They wanted to know who had written the letter and what she knew about the event.

== Discovery and disappearance of her body ==
A year and a half after the abduction, in August 1951, a neighbor of Antonija's mother was mowing his field on the edge of Lake Cerknica. It was below Martinjak, near Žerovniščnica Creek. He was mowing by hand when his scythe struck some clothing. Among the reeds, he found human remains. He suspected it might be Antonija and immediately informed her family. They went to view the body and at once recognized it as Antonija's. They identified her by her necklace, parts of her coat, which had leather-trimmed pockets, and by her teeth.

As soon as the police learned that the body had been found, they prevented Antonija's relatives from retrieving and burying it. Late the next day, people in white coats arrived by car, collected the remains, and took them to an unknown location. UDBA offices gave conflicting statements: some claimed it was not Antonija but a deceased partisan; others said the remains belonged to a woman from Jesenice who had gone mad and died wandering in the area. Some say Antonija's body was buried in the Postojna cemetery, while others believe it was discarded in an unknown place.

== Servant of God ==
A cause for the recognition of Antonija Karmela's martyrdom and sainthood is currently underway as part of the collective process for the Slovene Martyrs of the 20th Century, which was officially opened by the Episcopal Conference of Slovenia on 28 October 2002. Her current title is Servant of God.
