= Martinjak =

- Village
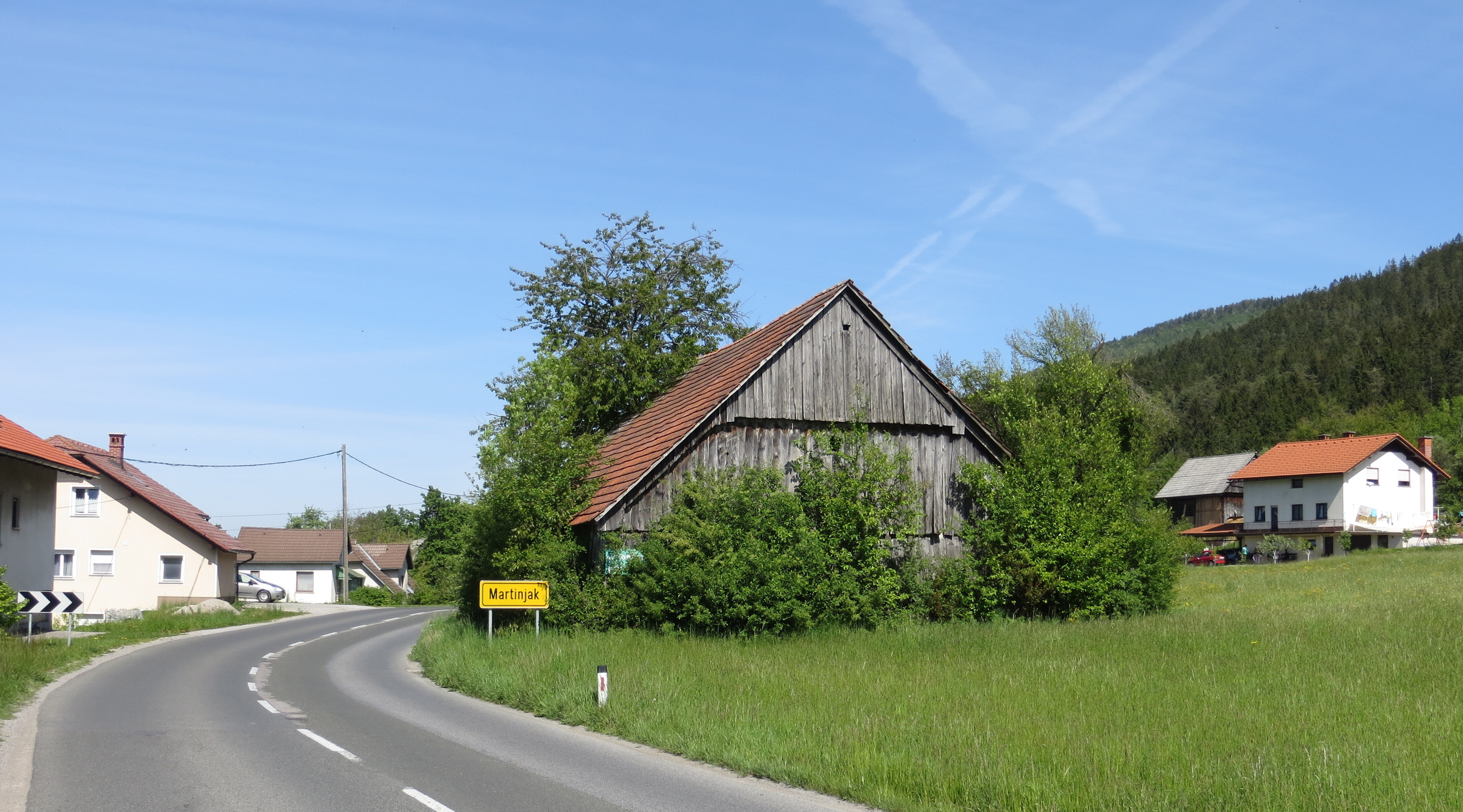

- Location in Slovenia
- Coordinates: 45°46′33.97″N 14°24′7.36″E
- Country: Slovenia
- Traditional region: Inner Carniola
- Statistical region: Littoral–Inner Carniola
- Municipality: Cerknica

Area
  - Total: 4.22 km^{2} (1.63 sq mi)
- Elevation: 565.5 m (1,855 ft)

Population (2020)
  - Total: 297
  - Density: 70.4/km^{2} (182/sq mi)

Martinjak (pronounced [maɾtiˈnjaːk], German: Martinsbach) is a village southeast of Cerknica, below Mount Slivnica in the Inner Carniola region of Slovenia.

== Church ==
The local church in the settlement is dedicated to Saint Vitus and belongs to the Parish of Cerknica. It was first mentioned in written sources dating to 1581. The wooden ceiling in the church dates to 1621. The current belfry was built between 1936 and 1938.

== Notable people ==
Notable people that were born or lived in Martinjak include the following:

- Antonija Premrov (1912–1949), Slovenian nurse, organist, choir director, martyr, victim of Communism, and Servant of God

== Gallery ==
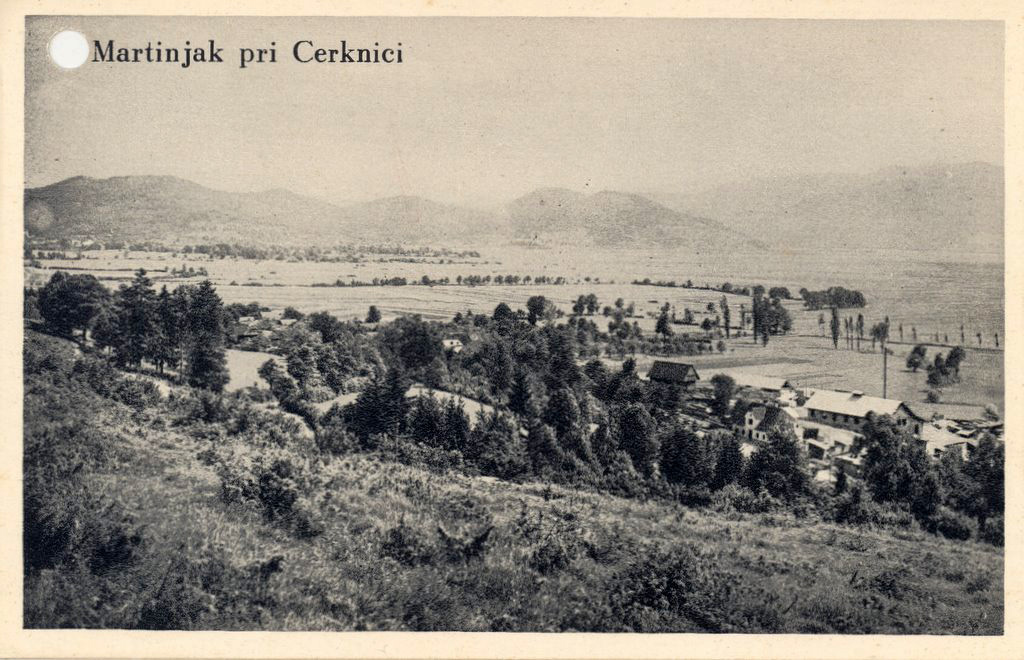
Historical postcard of Martinjak
