= Podšteberk =

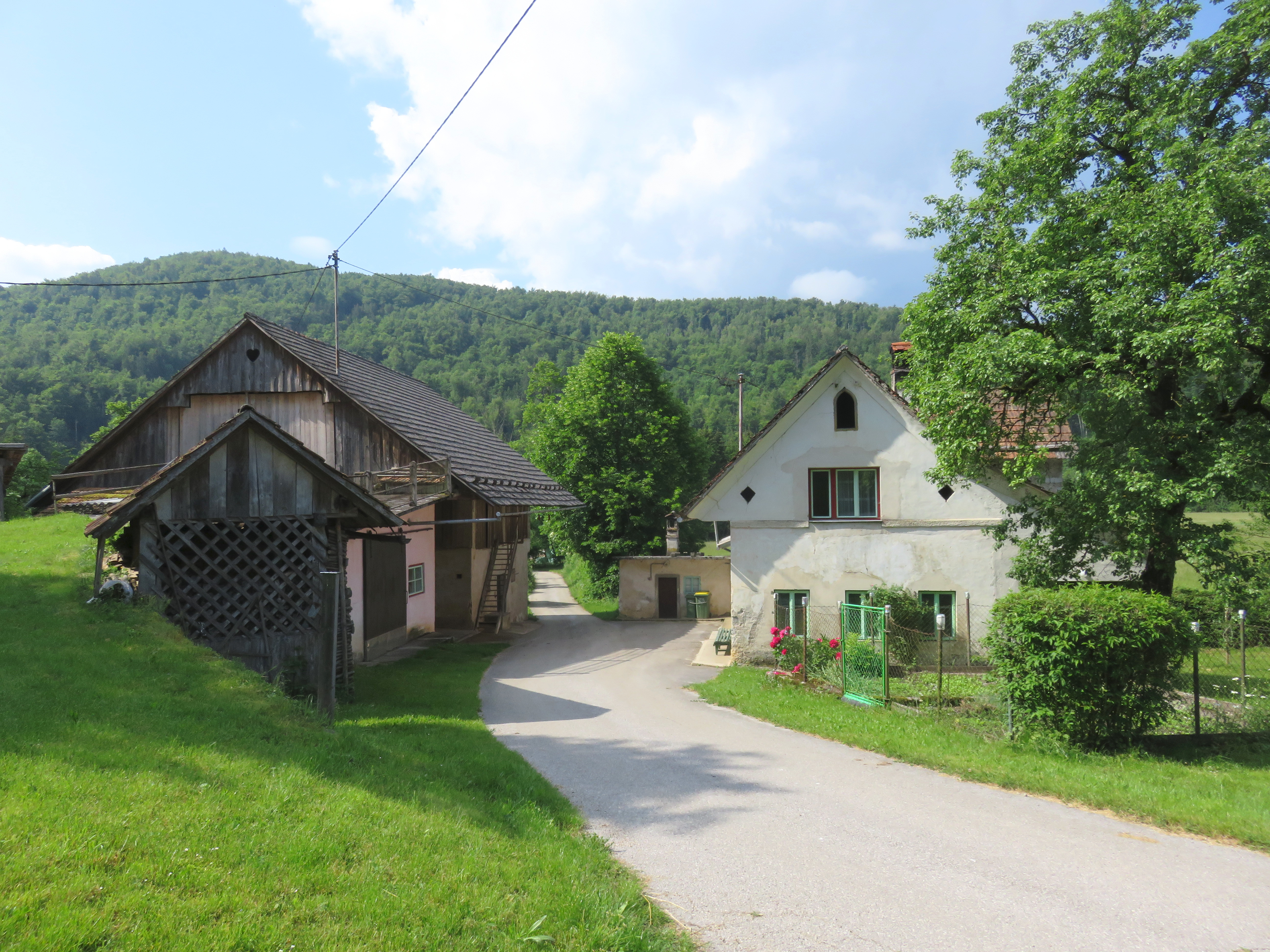

- Location in Slovenia
- Coordinates: 45°44′54″N 14°26′39″E
- Country: Slovenia
- Traditional region: Inner Carniola
- Statistical region: Littoral–Inner Carniola
- Municipality: Cerknica
- Elevation: 571 m (1,873 ft)

Podšteberk (pronounced [pɔtˈʃteːbɛɾk], in older sources Stegbrg, German: Stegberg) is a former settlement in the Municipality of Cerknica in central Slovenia. It is now part of the village of Lipsenj. The area is part of the traditional region of Inner Carniola and is now included with the rest of the municipality in the Littoral–Inner Carniola Statistical Region.

== Geography ==
Podšteberk lies in a valley east of the village center of Lipsenj. Štebrščica Creek (named Lipsenjščica Creek further downstream) has its source below Podšteberk at Obrh Springs, a pair of gushing springs. Water flows from both of them during periods of heavy rain, and otherwise only from the lower spring.

== Name ==
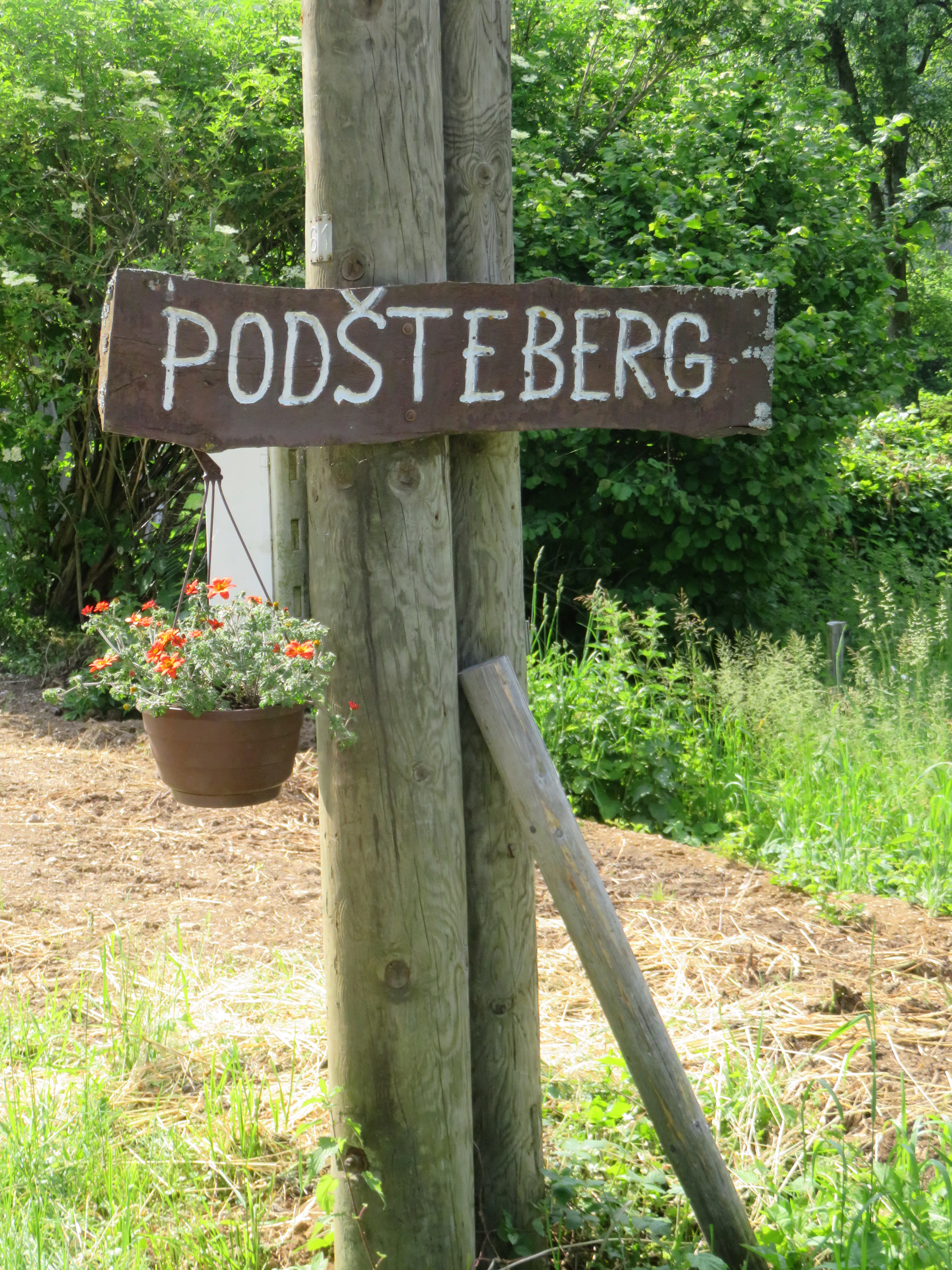
Sign in Podšteberk

The name Podšteberk is a fused prepositional phrase: pod 'below' + Šteberk, referring to Šteberk Castle (German: Stegberg) above the village.

== History ==
Podšteberk had a population of 40 living in five houses in 1880, 23 living in four houses in 1890, and 39 living in six houses in 1900. Podšteberk was annexed by Lipsenj in 1952, ending its existence as a separate settlement.
