= Dolenje Jezero =

- Village
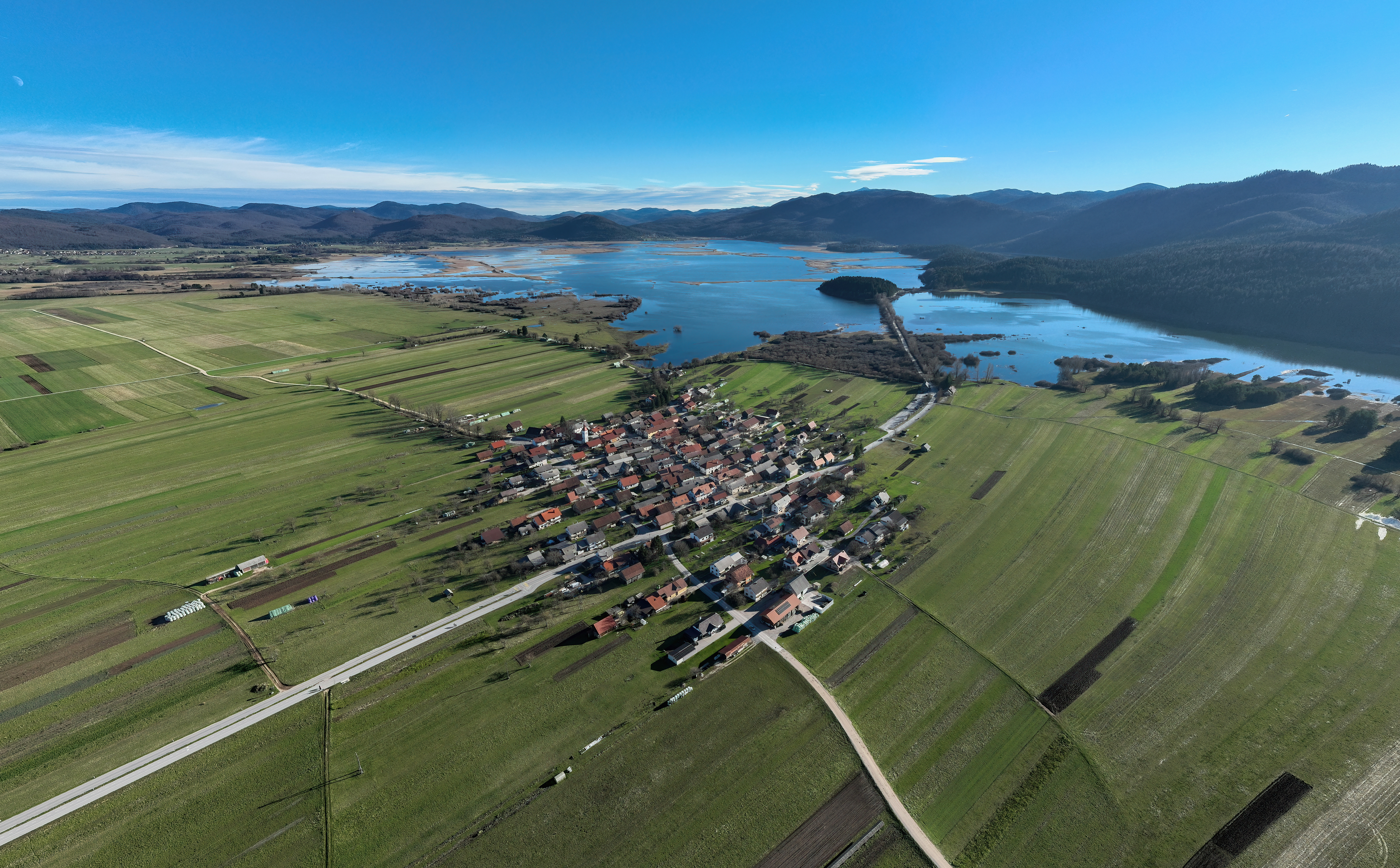

- Location in Slovenia
- Coordinates: 45°46′38.63″N 14°21′30.83″E
- Country: Slovenia
- Traditional region: Inner Carniola
- Statistical region: Littoral–Inner Carniola
- Municipality: Cerknica

Area
  - Total: 5.3 km^{2} (2.0 sq mi)
- Elevation: 553.4 m (1,816 ft)

Population (2020)
  - Total: 240
  - Density: 45/km^{2} (120/sq mi)

Dolenje Jezero (pronounced [dɔˈleːnjɛ ˈjeːzɛɾɔ]; German: Unterseedorf) is a village on the northern edge of Lake Cerknica in the Municipality of Cerknica in the Inner Carniola region of Slovenia.

== Name ==
The name Dolenje Jezero means 'lower lake' and is a semantic contrast to the neighboring village of Gorenje Jezero (literally, 'upper lake'), which stands about 20 meters (66 ft) higher in elevation. Like other villages named Jezero, the name refers to a local landscape element—in this case, Lake Cerknica.

== Church ==
The local church in the southwest part of the settlement is dedicated to Saints Peter and Paul and belongs to the Parish of Cerknica.

== Gallery ==
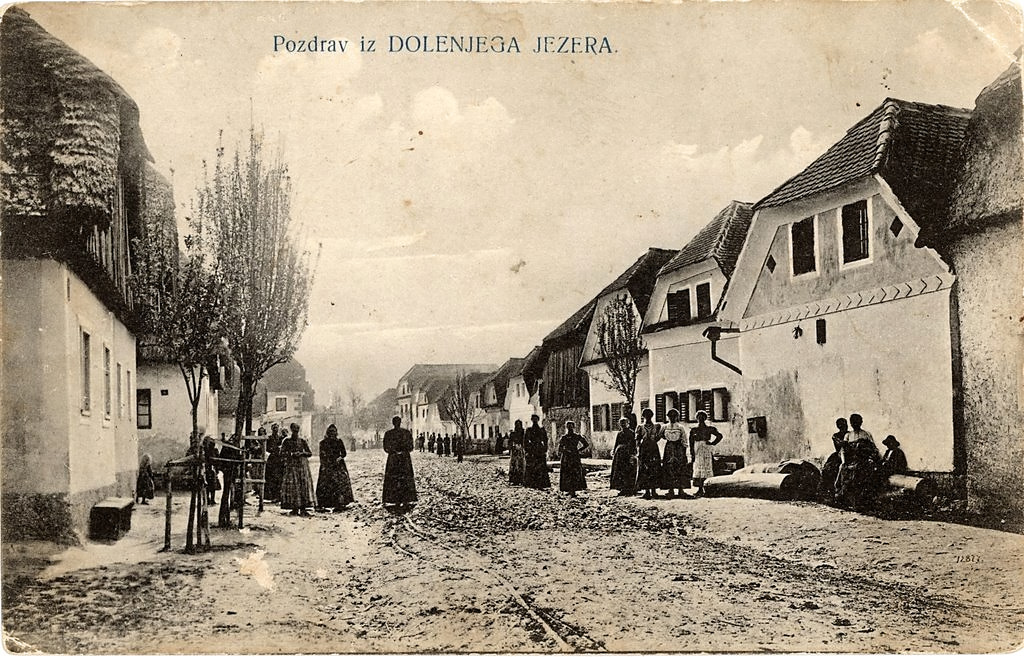
1920 postcard of Dolenje Jezero
