= Sveti Štefan, Cerknica =

Sveti Štefan
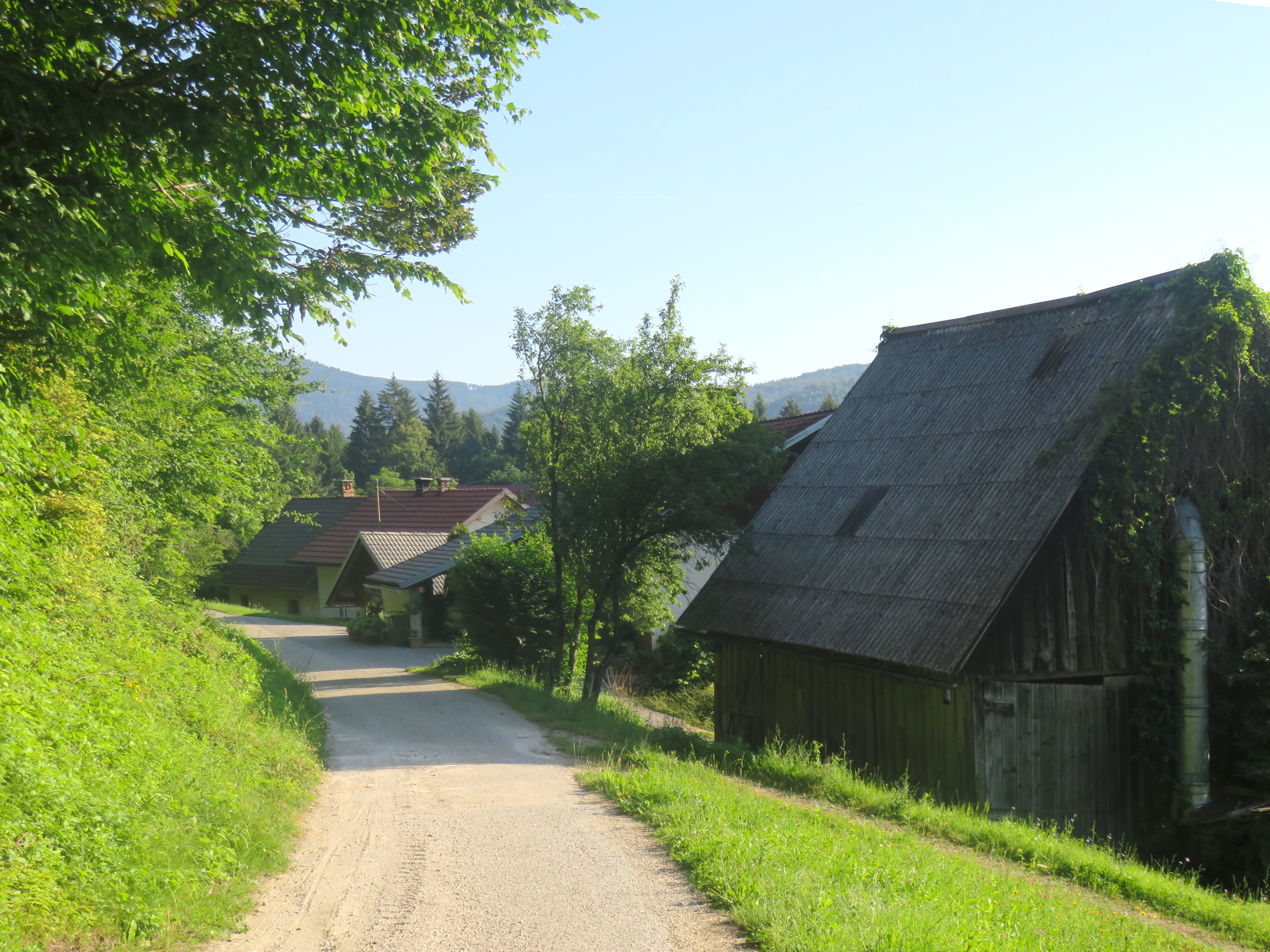

- Location in Slovenia
- Coordinates: 45°44′59″N 14°25′59″E
- Country: Slovenia
- Traditional region: Inner Carniola
- Statistical region: Littoral–Inner Carniola
- Municipality: Cerknica
- Elevation: 570 m (1,870 ft)

Sveti Štefan (pronounced [ˈsʋeːti ˈʃteːfan], German: St. Stefan) is a former settlement in the Municipality of Cerknica in central Slovenia. It is now part of the village of Lipsenj. The area is part of the traditional region of Inner Carniola and is now included with the rest of the municipality in the Littoral–Inner Carniola Statistical Region.

== Geography ==
Sveti Štefan lies in a valley east of the village center of Lipsenj. Štebrščica Creek (named Lipsenjščica Creek further downstream) has its source east of Sveti Štefan at Obrh Springs, a pair of gushing springs. Water flows from both of them during periods of heavy rain, and otherwise only from the lower spring.

== Name ==
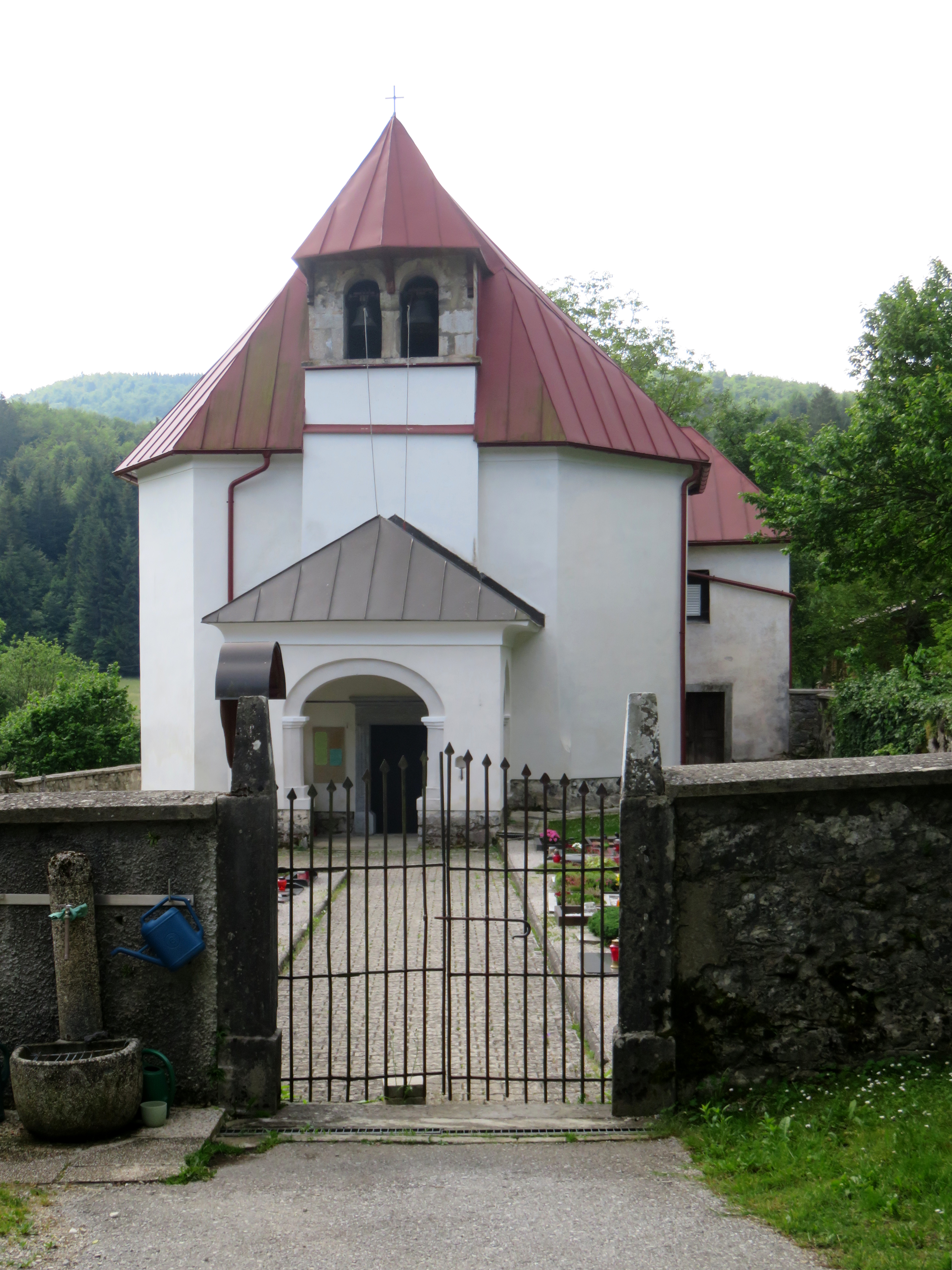
Saint Stephen's Church

The name Sveti Štefan means 'Saint Stephen', and the village was named after the local church, which is dedicated to Saint Stephen.

== History ==
Sveti Štefan had a population of 21 living in four houses in 1880, 16 living in five houses in 1890, and 19 living in four houses in 1900. Sveti Štefan was annexed by Lipsenj in 1952, ending its existence as a separate settlement.
