= Žerovnica =

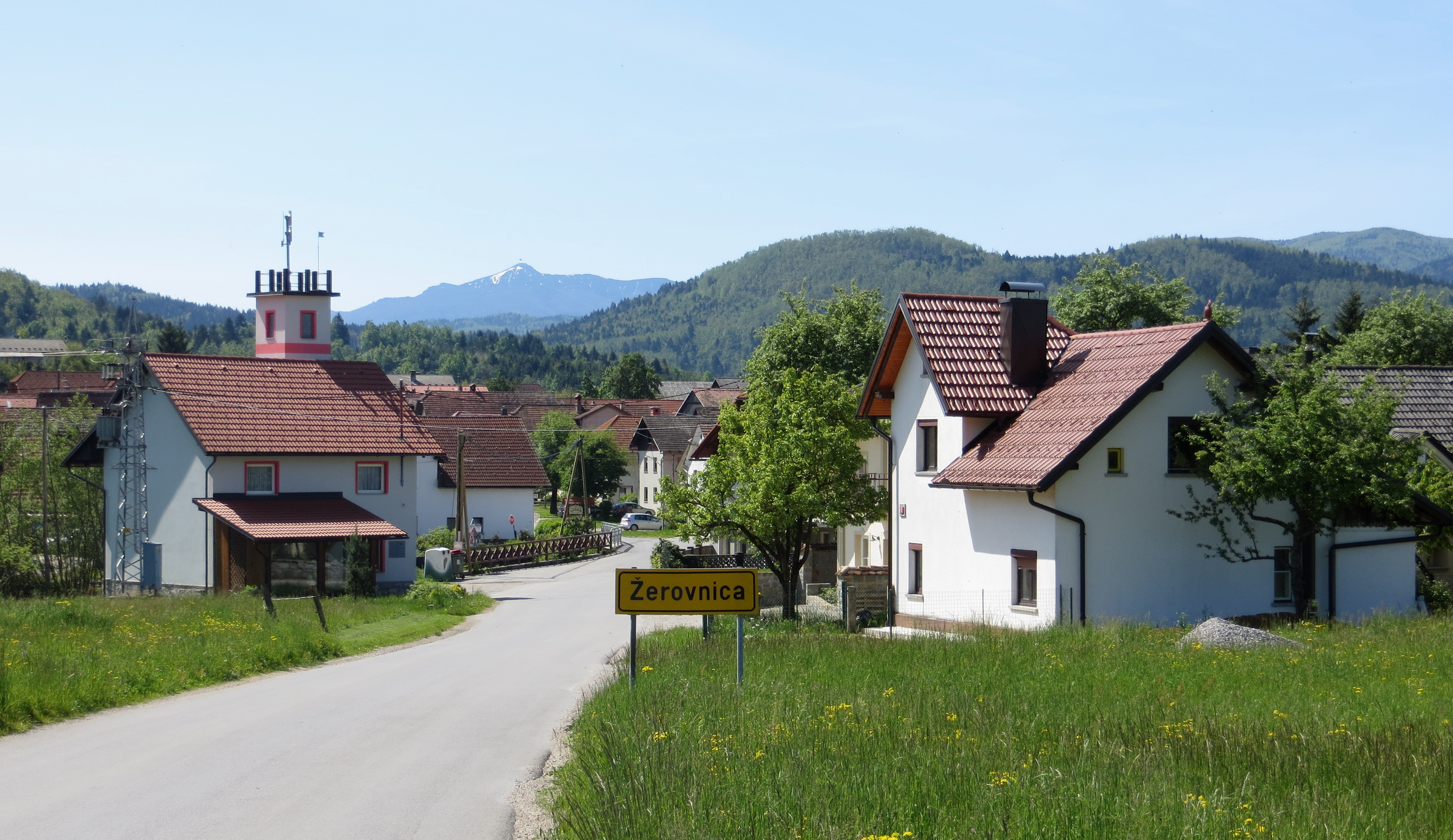

- Location in Slovenia
- Coordinates: 45°45′28.67″N 14°25′35.98″E
- Country: Slovenia
- Traditional region: Inner Carniola
- Statistical region: Littoral–Inner Carniola
- Municipality: Cerknica

Area
  - Total: 5.21 km^{2} (2.01 sq mi)
- Elevation: 561.8 m (1,843 ft)

Population (2020)
  - Total: 176
  - Density: 33.8/km^{2} (87.5/sq mi)

Žerovnica (pronounced [ʒɛˈɾoːu̯nitsa]; in older sources also Žirovnica, German: Scheraunitz) is a village on the eastern shores of Lake Cerknica in the Municipality of Cerknica in the Inner Carniola region of Slovenia.

== Church ==
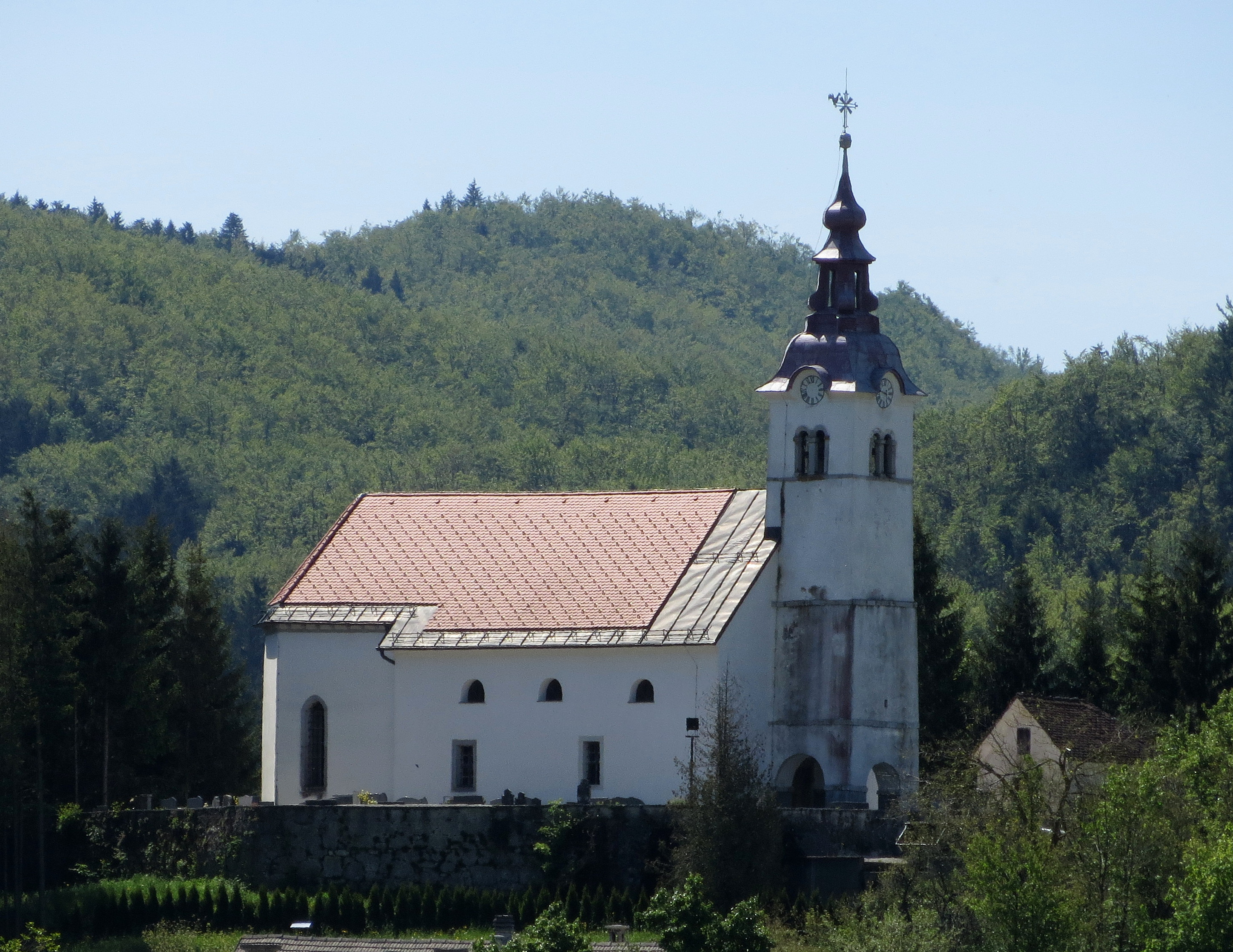
Conversion of Paul Church

The local church in the village is dedicated to the Conversion of Paul and belongs to the Parish of Grahovo. The church stands on the southwest edge of the village. It has a rectangular nave, a polygonal chancel walled on three sides, and a bell tower with a Baroque roof. The church was first mentioned in written sources in 1497 and was remodeled in the Baroque style at the beginning of the 18th century. The interior furnishings dates from the 19th and 20th centuries.

== Cultural heritage ==
In addition to Conversion of Paul Church, the entire village is listed as cultural heritage. It is laid out as a ribbon village with two rows of houses and a center that gradually narrows towards one end, fields to either side, and kitchen gardens along the central street. Several other structures in Žerovnica also have protected cultural monument status:

- The Kamna Gorica archaeological site is an unexcavated site from antiquity. Roman-era finds have been discovered at the site.
- The Na Hribu archaeological site is believed to be the site of a prehistoric hill fort. The archaeologist Mehtilda Urleb carried out excavations at the site, where she found modern-era artifacts.

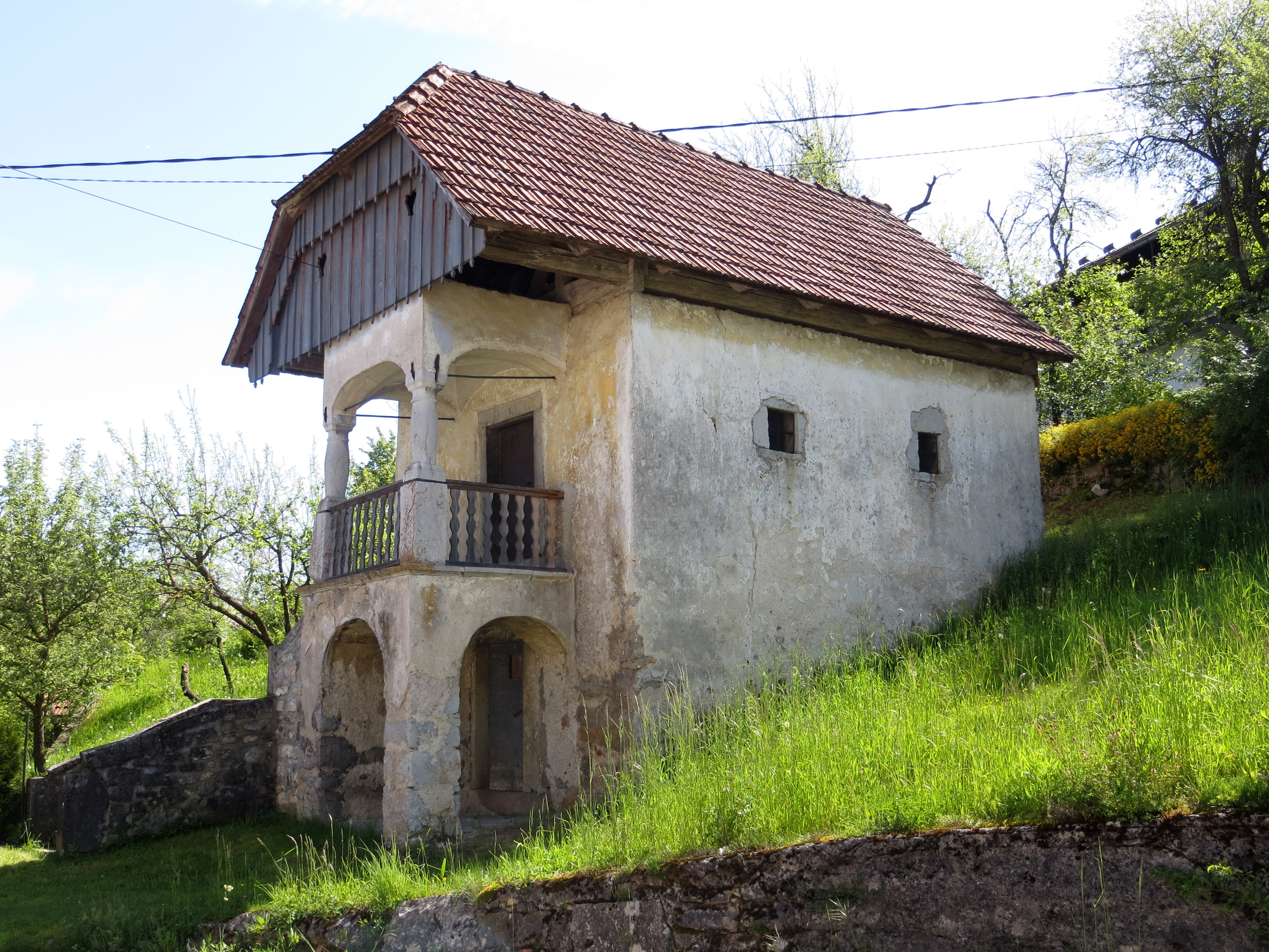
Herbljan Granary

- The Herbljan Granary (Slovene: Herbljanova kašča) dates from the mid-19th century. It stands along the road below the church. It is a single-cell structure built into a hill with a partial vaulted cellar. The narrower side has a two-story portico; the lower level is flanked by a stairway on the left side leading to the upper level, which is supported by two columns.
- The granary at Žerovnica no. 7 stands in the northern part of the village. It is a two-story stone structure with access to the upper level via a stairway on one side of the entry portico, which is supported by two columns. The granary has a tiled gabled roof.
- The Krkot Sawmill (Slovene: Krkotova žaga) is located at the farm at Žerovnica no. 55. The sawmill was converted to electric power in 1980; it was previously driven by a tub wheel. It stands on a stone foundation next to a millrace; the drive mechanism is in the lower part and two Venice frame saws are in the wooden upper part. A carpenter's workshop and a smithy were added to the operation in 1927.
- The Mekavc Mill (Slovene: Mekavčev mlin) stands along Žerovniščica Creek at Žerovnica nos. 58 and 61. It is a two-story stone building with the year 1864 carved into the rectangular door casing. The mill is in the lower floor and the year 1806 is carved into the weir. The property also has a sawmill that has been converted to electric power and a wooden double hayrack.
- The Vesel Mill (Slovene: Veselov mlin) is located at Žerovnica no. 59 next to the karst spring feeding Žerovniščica Creek and Vesel Cave (Slovene: Veselova jama). It is a single-story building with the year 1845 carved into the door casing and 1843 carved into a beam. The property includes a smithy with stamp mills, a Venice frame saw, a stall built partially from stone, a hayloft, and a double hayrack with stone columns dating from 1840.
- A Second World War monument stands in the northern part of the village next to steps leading to Žerovniščica Creek. It was designed by Anton Bitenc and Alenka Lenarčič, and was unveiled in 1959.
