= Gorenje Jezero =

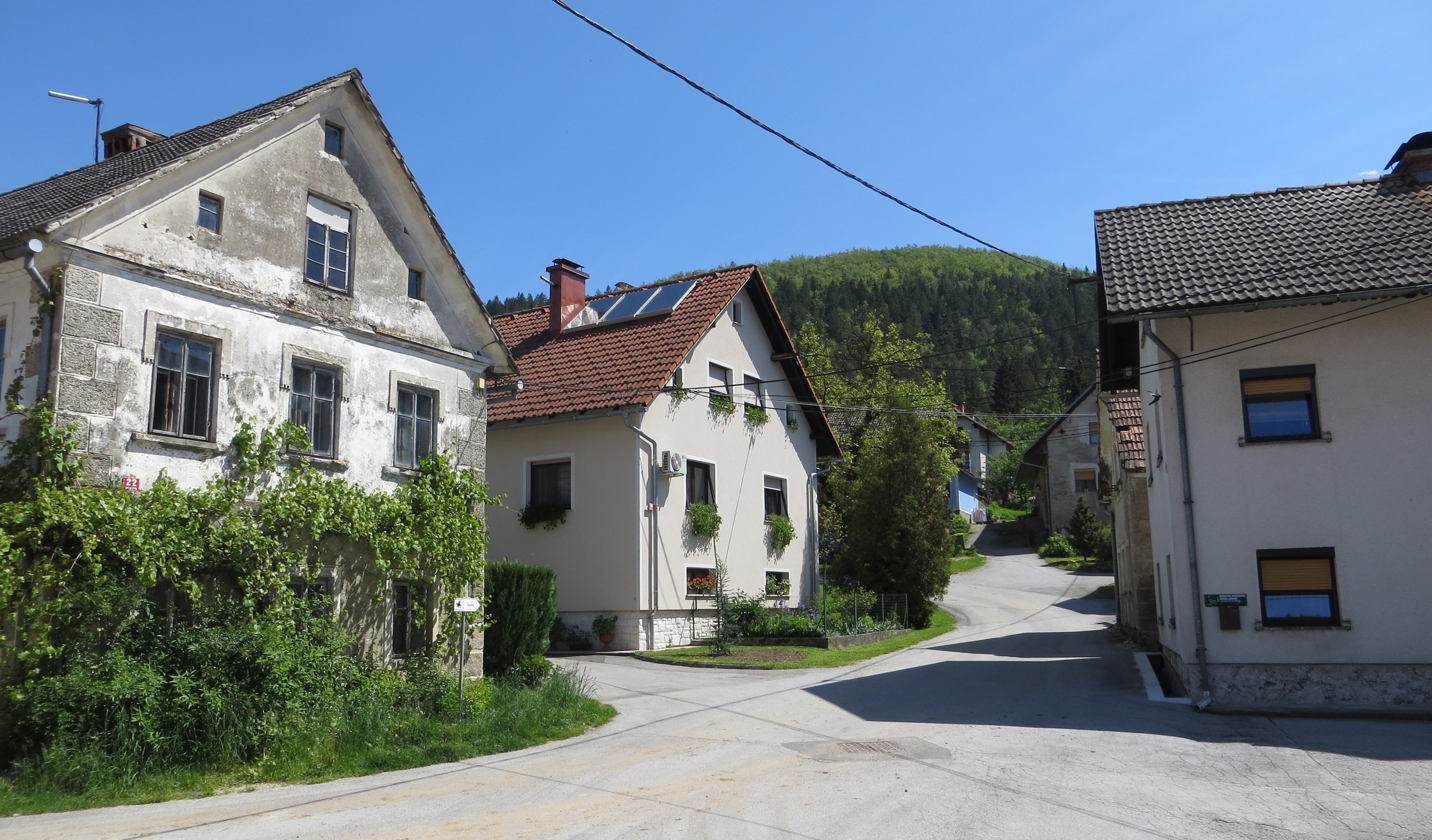

- Location in Slovenia
- Coordinates: 45°43′46.35″N 14°24′41.98″E
- Country: Slovenia
- Traditional region: Inner Carniola
- Statistical region: Littoral–Inner Carniola
- Municipality: Cerknica

Area
  - Total: 7.9 km^{2} (3.1 sq mi)
- Elevation: 572.9 m (1,880 ft)

Population (2020)
  - Total: 132
  - Density: 17/km^{2} (43/sq mi)

Gorenje Jezero (pronounced [ɡɔˈɾeːnjɛ ˈjeːzɛɾɔ]; German: Oberseedorf) is a village on the southern edge of Lake Cerknica in the Municipality of Cerknica in the Inner Carniola region of Slovenia.

== Name ==
The name Gorenje Jezero means 'upper lake' and is a semantic contrast to the neighboring village of Dolenje Jezero (literally, 'lower lake'), which stands about 20 meters (66 ft) lower in elevation. Like other villages named Jezero, the name refers to a local landscape element—in this case, Lake Cerknica.

== Church ==
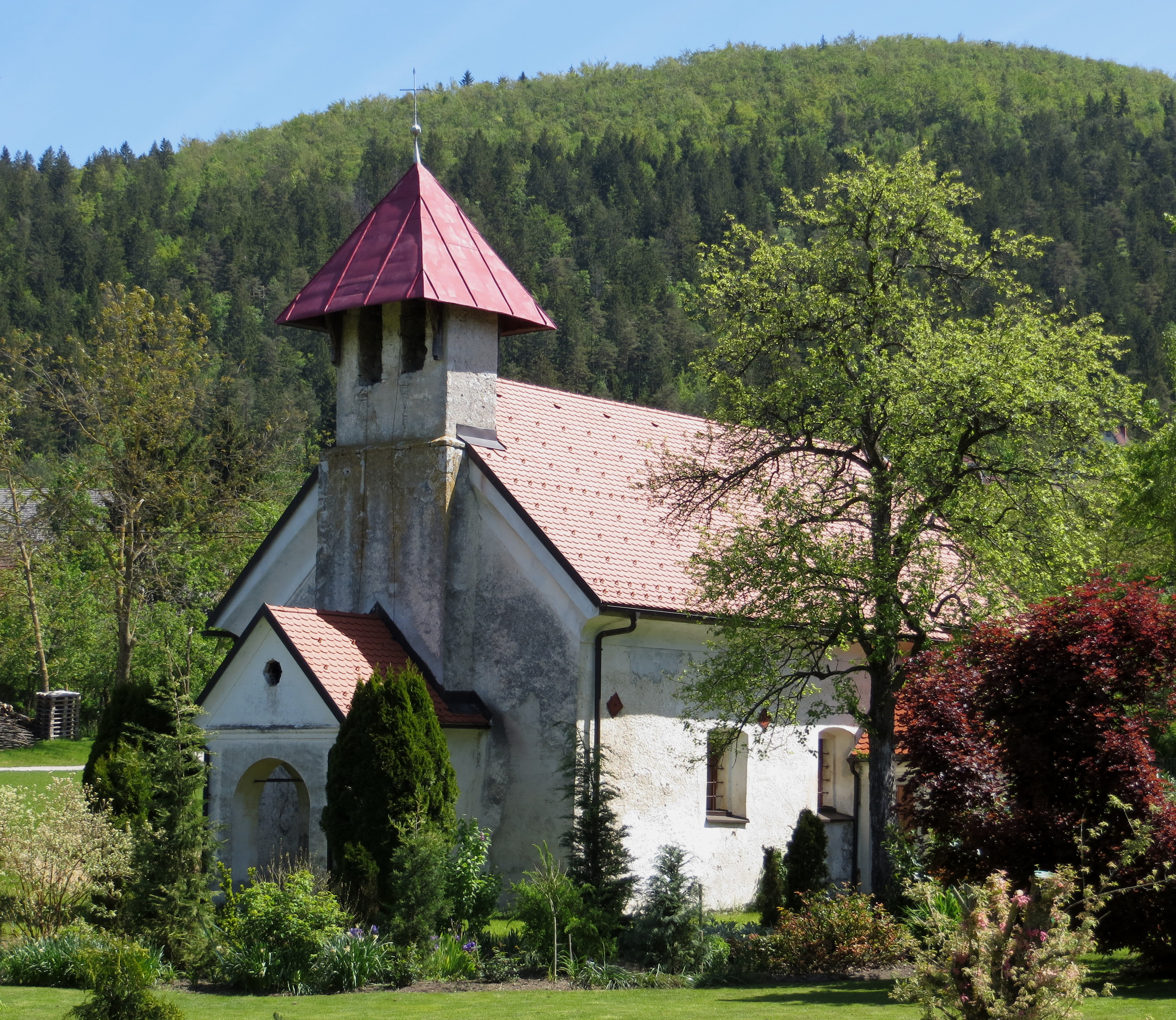
Saint Cantius' Church

The local church is in the southwest part of the settlement. It is dedicated to Saint Cantius and belongs to the Parish of Stari Trg pri Ložu.
