= Lake Cerknica =

Intermittent lake in Slovenia

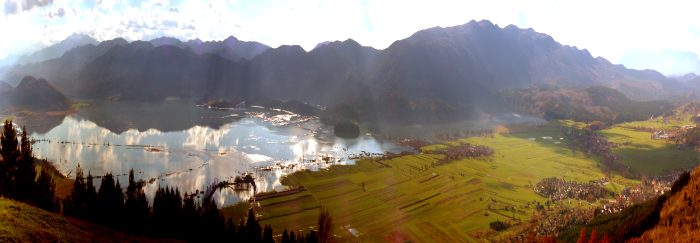
- Lake Cerknica after rain

- Location within Slovenia
- Location: Inner Carniola
- Coordinates: 45°45′08″N 14°23′06″E
- Type: intermittent
- Basin countries: Slovenia
- Surface area: 38 km^{2} (15 sq mi) (max.)
- Average depth: 10 m (33 ft) (max.)
- Surface elevation: 546 to 551 m (1,791 to 1,808 ft)
- Settlements: Cerknica, Dolenje Jezero, Gorenje Jezero, Grahovo

Ramsar Wetland
- Official name: Cerkniško jezero z okolico
- Designated: 19 January 2006
- Reference no.: 1600

Lake Cerknica (pronounced [ˈtseːɾknitsa]; Slovene: Cerkniško jezero) is an intermittent lake in the southern part of the Cerknica Polje, a karst polje in Inner Carniola, a region in southwestern Slovenia.

== Description ==
The lake, oriented in the Dinaric direction from north-west to south-east, is present for the most part of the year. When full, it is the largest lake in the country. The plain is surrounded by the Javornik Hills (1,268 metres or 4,160 feet) to the south and Slivnica (1,022 m or 3,353 ft) to the north, both belonging to Dinaric Alps. The area of the lake mainly reaches 28 square kilometres (11 sq mi), but can reach up to 38 km^{2} (15 sq mi) and the surface level varies from 546 m (1,791 ft) to 551 m (1,808 ft) above sea level. The largest settlement at the border of the lake is Cerknica, located north of the lake. Various watersports, including rowing, are popular on the lake.

== Environment ==
The climate in the area is continental, with a mean temperature of 9.2 °C (48.6 °F) and the annual precipitation about 1,700 millimetres (67 in). Botanically, the lake is distinguished by amphibious plants. It is therefore a part of two Natura 2000 areas of protection and the focus of the Inner Carniola Regional Park, which covers additional Natura 2000 areas in the broader region. The lake is an important wildlife resource, especially as a nesting place for many bird species. It has been designated an Important Bird Area (IBA) by BirdLife International.

=== Intermittency ===
The lake, which under ordinary conditions has an area of about 26 km^{2} (10 sq mi) and a mean depth of 6.1 m (20 ft), communicates through a number of openings with a series of subterranean reservoirs or caverns, some of which are above the lake level in the surrounding hills. In the summer, when the rainfall is slight, the lake is completely drained into the reservoirs lying below its level, and its bed is speedily covered with rich vegetation. With the returning heavy rains in autumn, the surrounding higher reservoirs are filled and discharge suddenly through the subterranean passages into the lake, so that the latter very rapidly regains its ordinary volume and may even inundate the surrounding country. The changes in level are, however, very irregular. Sometimes the lake does not disappear for several years, and it can remain dry for over a year, as it did in 1834–35. It is rich in fish, which disappear and return with the water.

== Research history ==
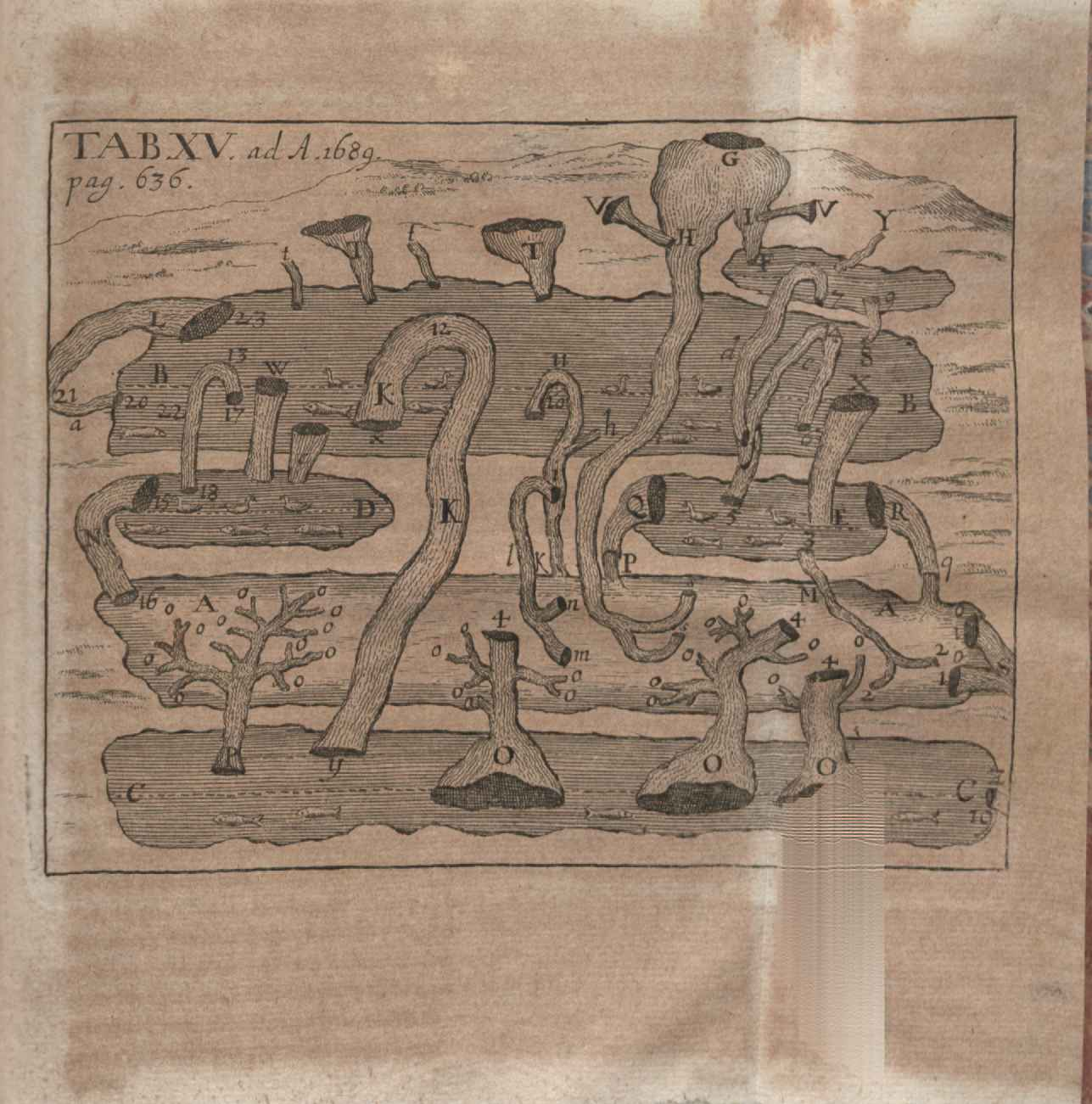
Illustration of Lacus Cirknicensis potiora phaenomena published in Acta Eruditorum, 1689

Strabo in his Geography mentions a "marsh called Lugeon" (helos Lougeon kaloumenon) which has been identified with Lake Cerknica, Lougeon being Strabo's Greek rendition of a local toponym, perhaps of Illyrian origin. It is Romanized as Lugeum. In November 1687 the Carniolan polymath Johann Weikhard von Valvasor described the lake in his letter to the Royal Society, an excerpt of which was published in the Society's Philosophical Transactions in December that year. He proposed a model of filling and emptying the lake, based on Cartesian mechanics. The first to accurately describe the functioning of Lake Cerknica was Tobias Gruber in 1781, followed in 1784 by Belsazar Hacquet.

== Gallery ==
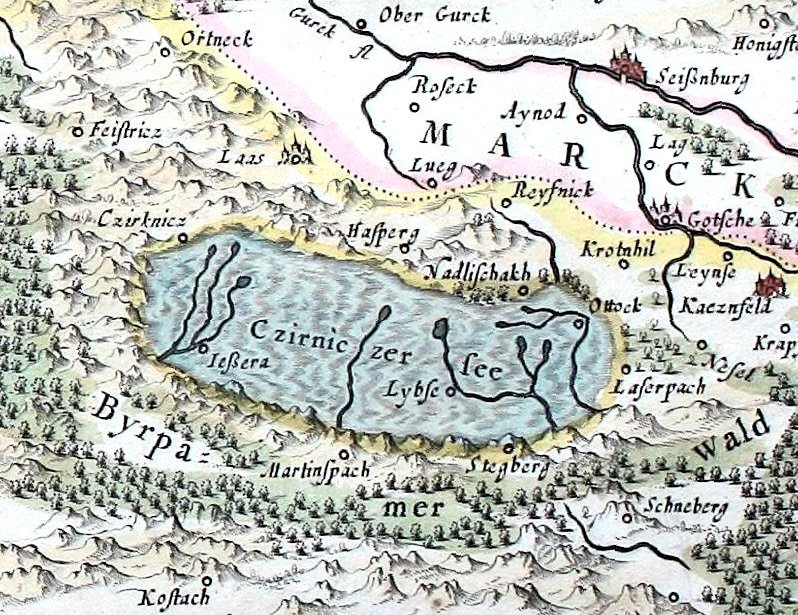
Lake Cerknica in Atlas Maior, 1659

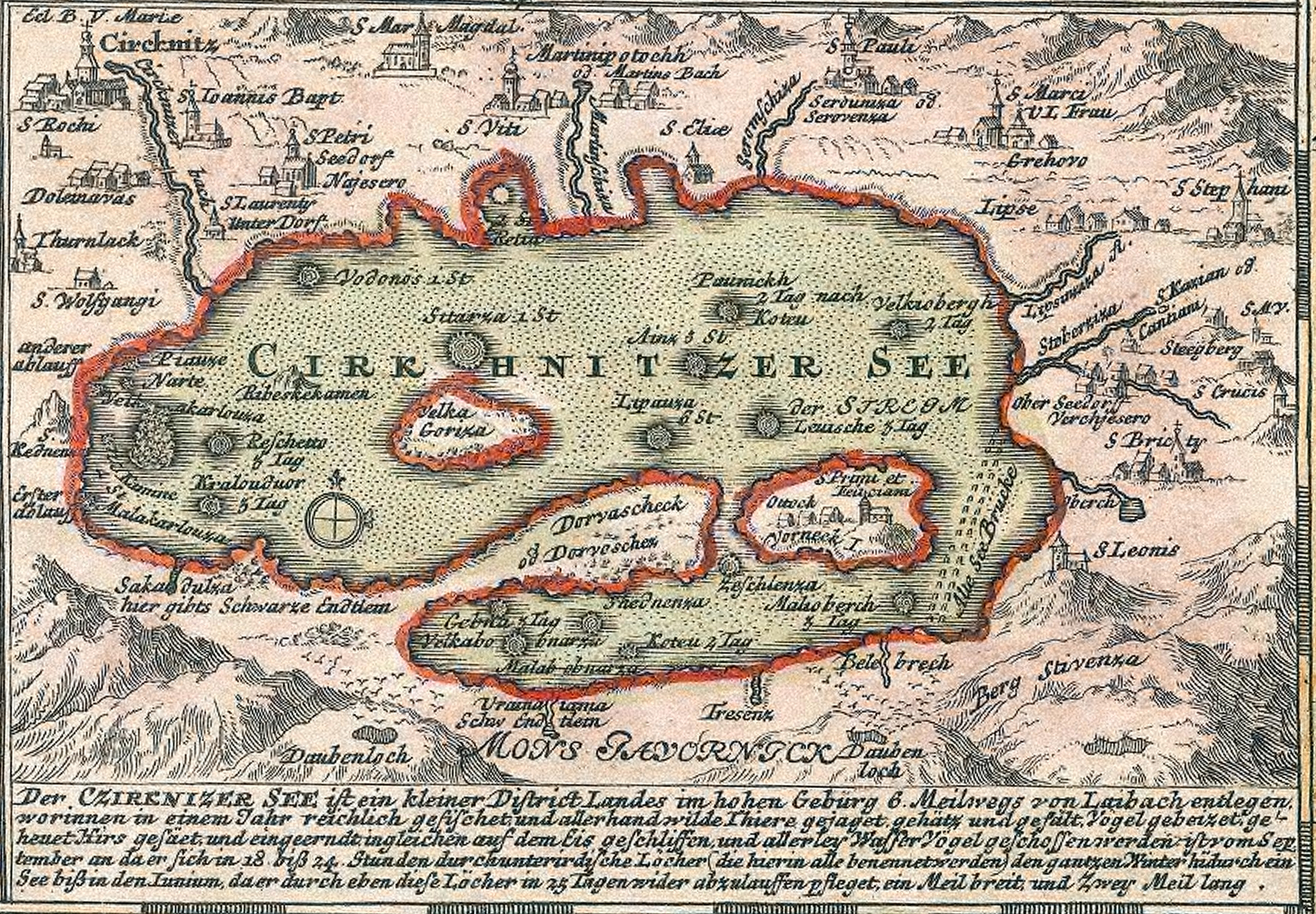
Lake Cerknica in Tabula Ducatus Carnioliae, 1714

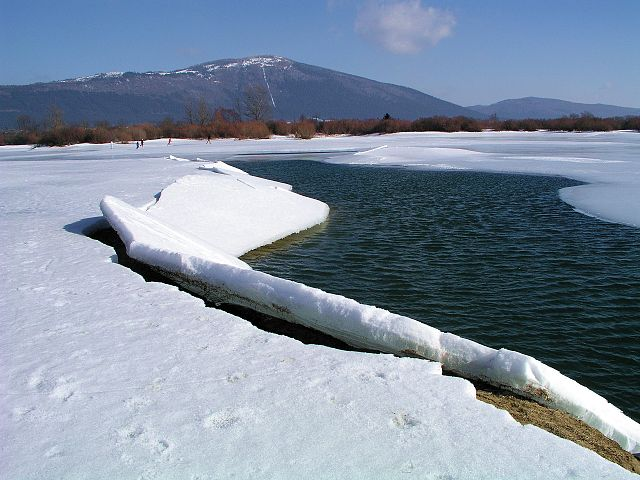
Lake Cerknica in winter, with the summit of Mount Slivnica in the background

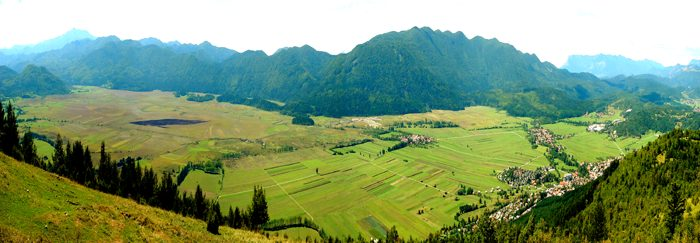
The Cerknica Karst Field after the lake has dried out

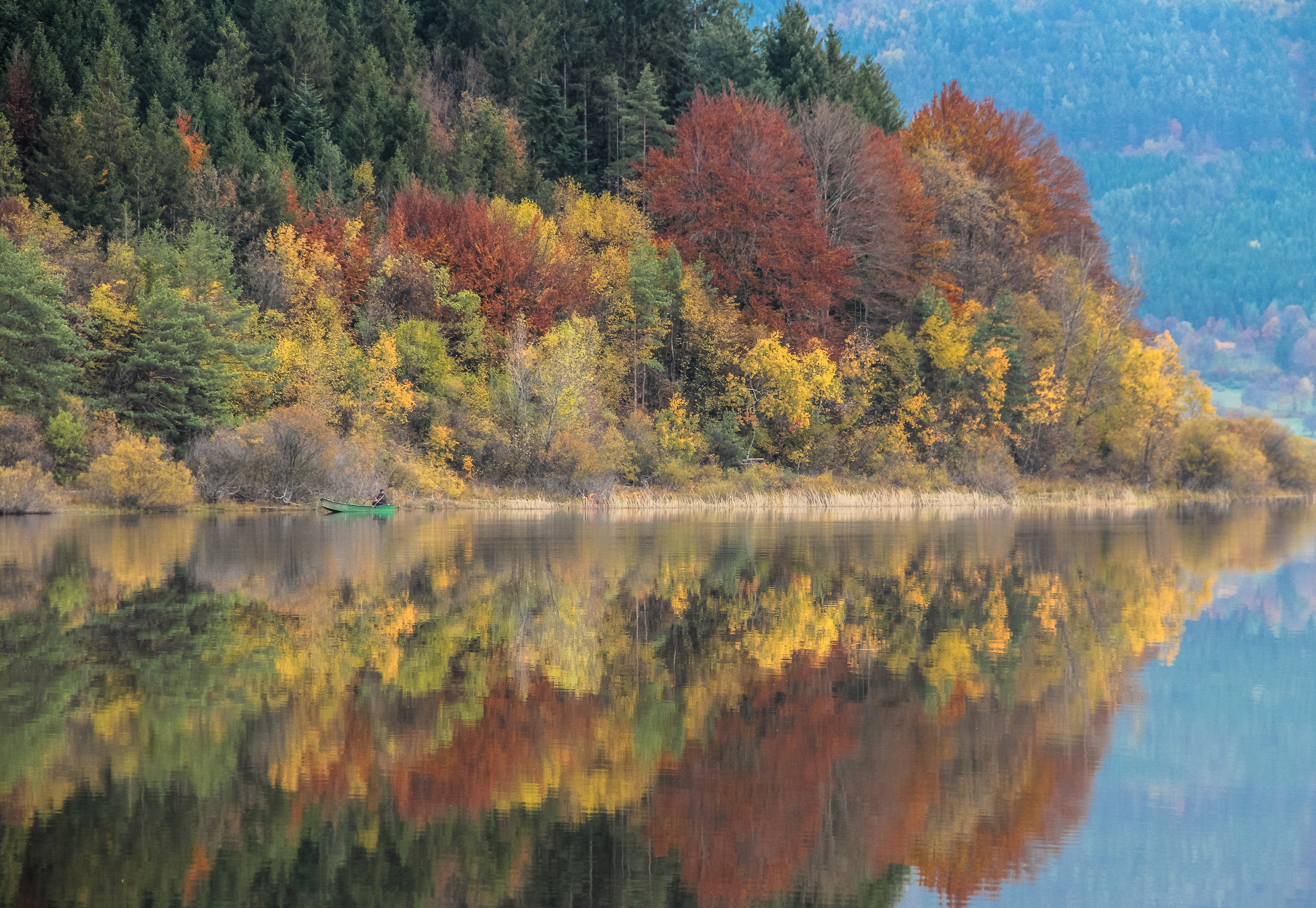
Lake Cerknica in the autumn

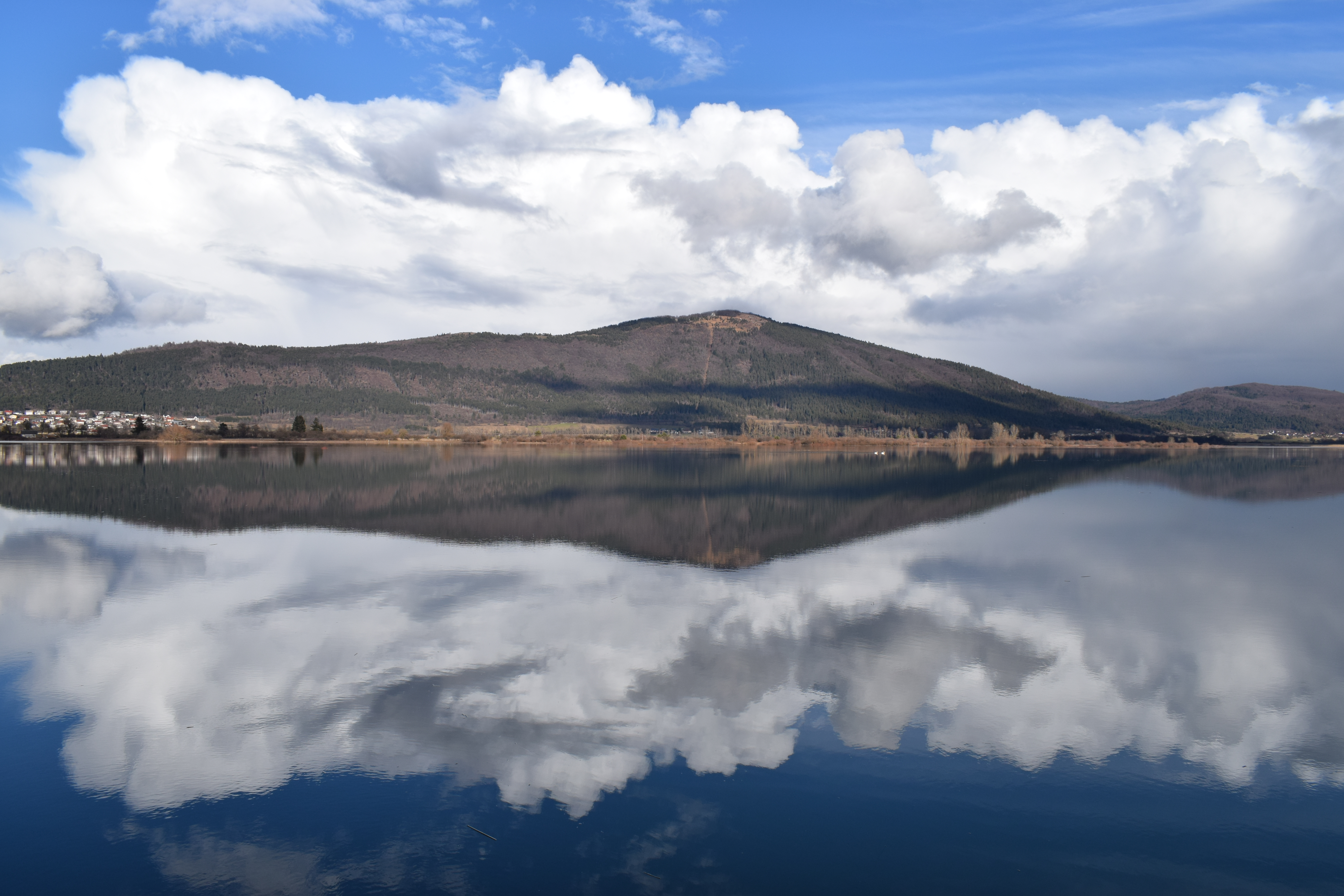
Slivnica and clouds reflected in the lake
