= Cerknica =

- Town
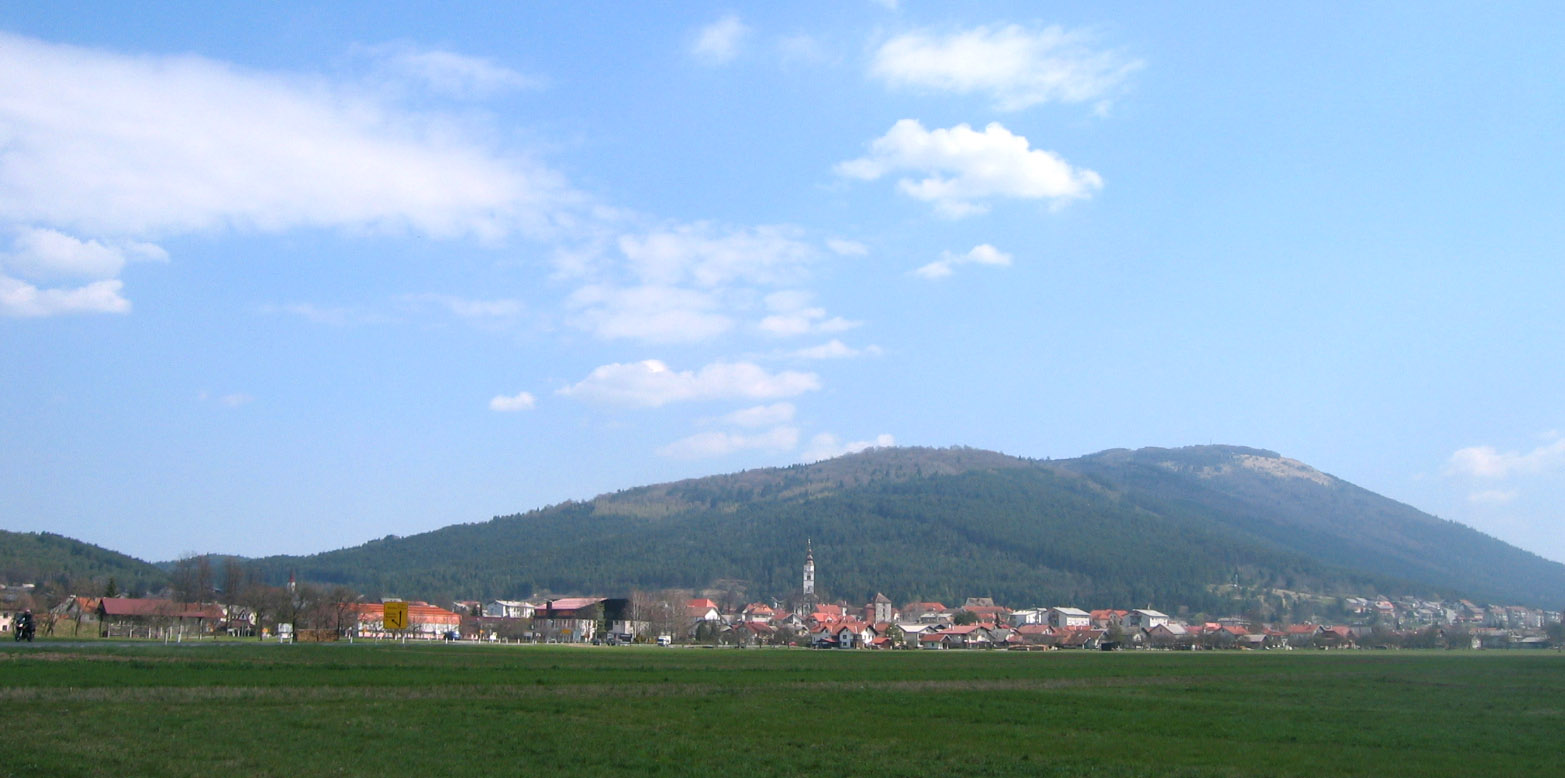
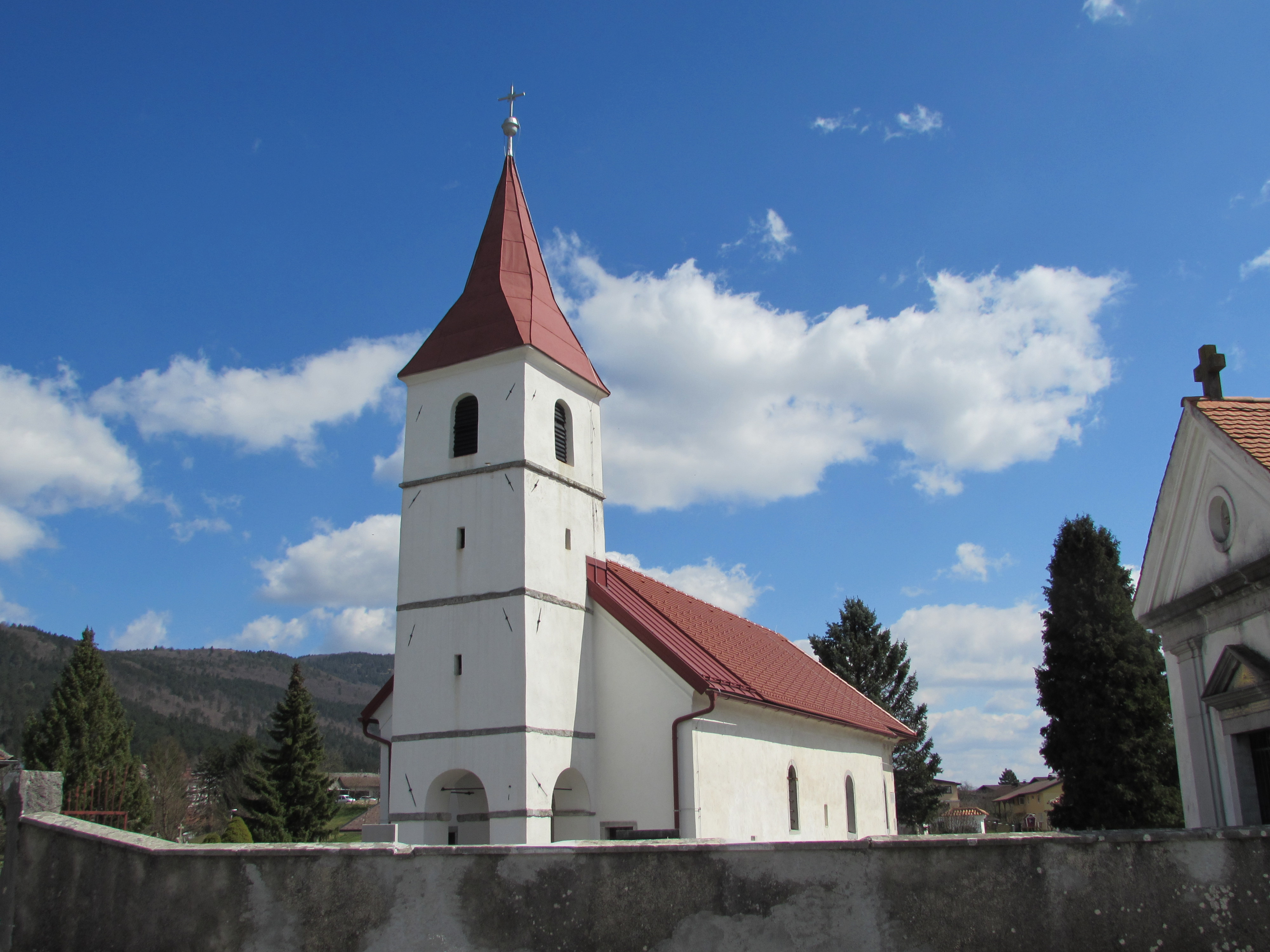
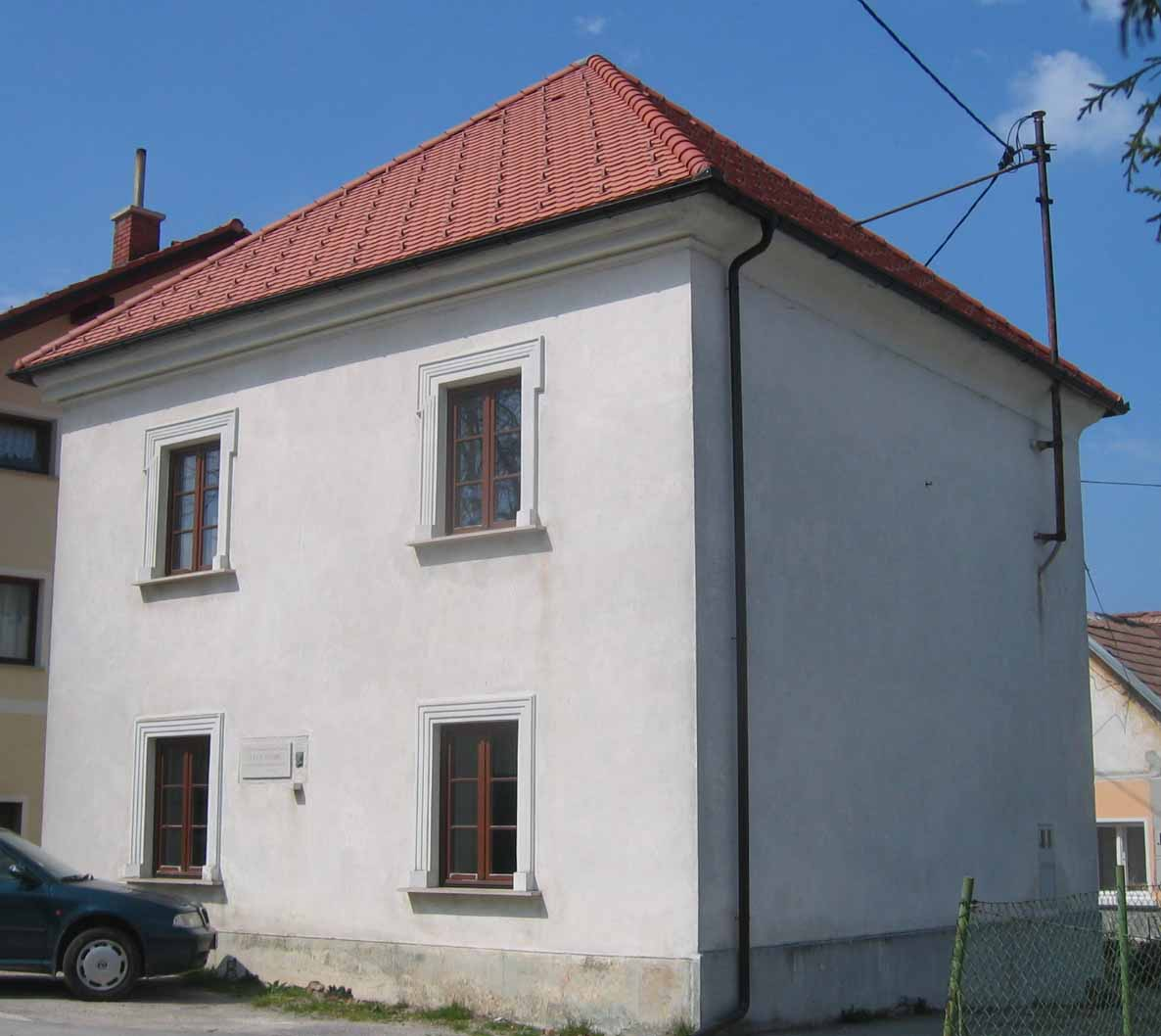
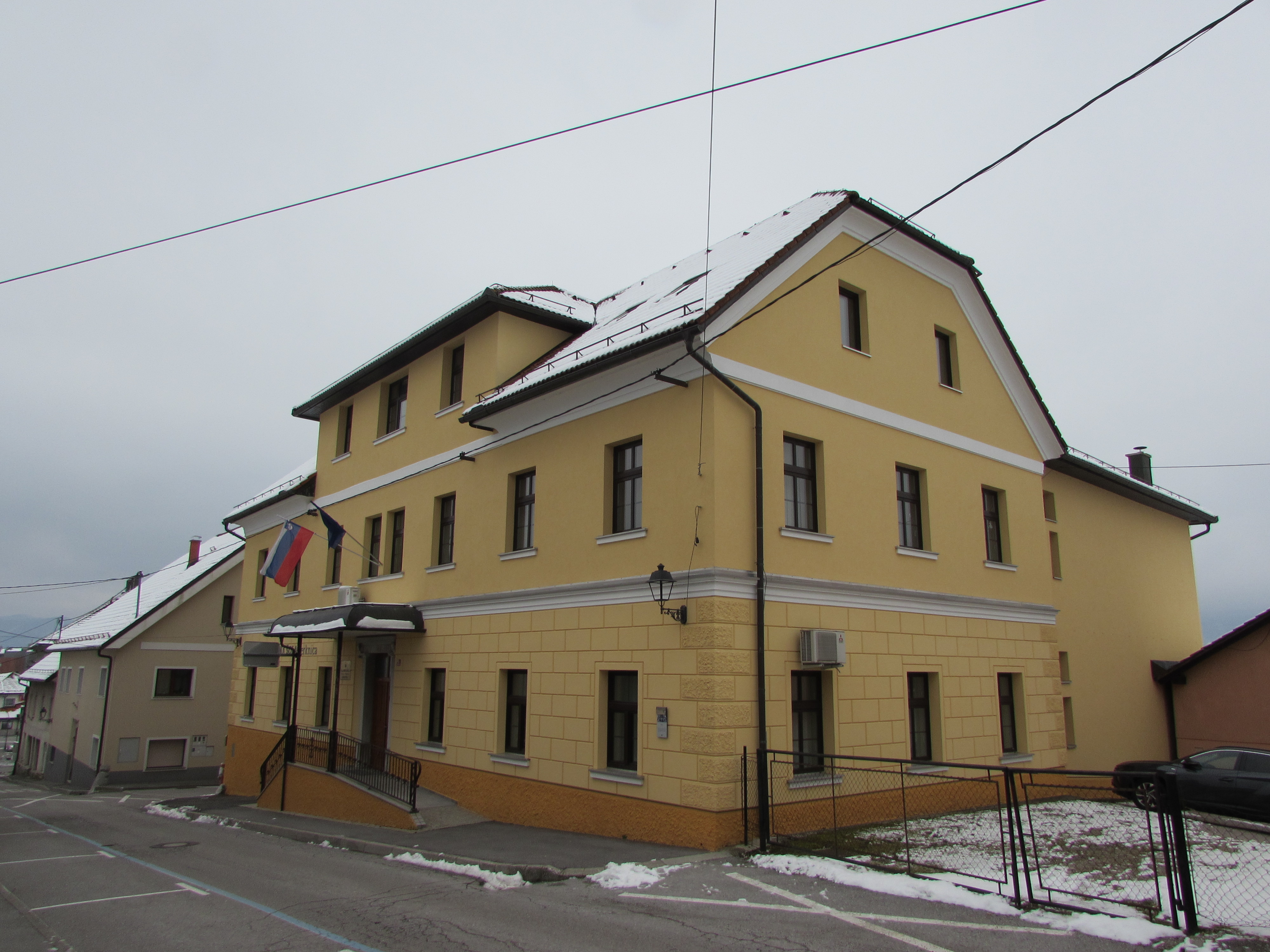
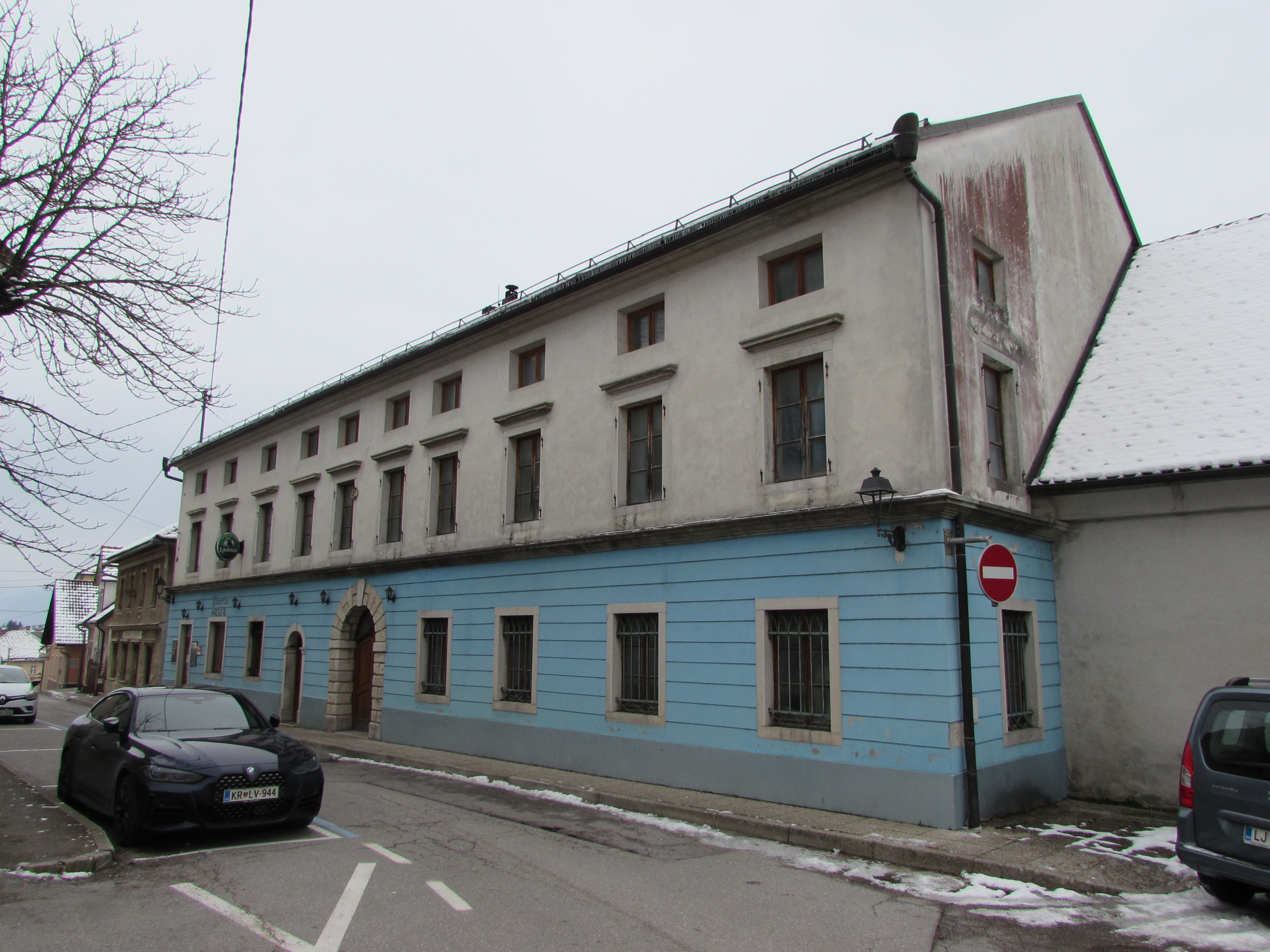
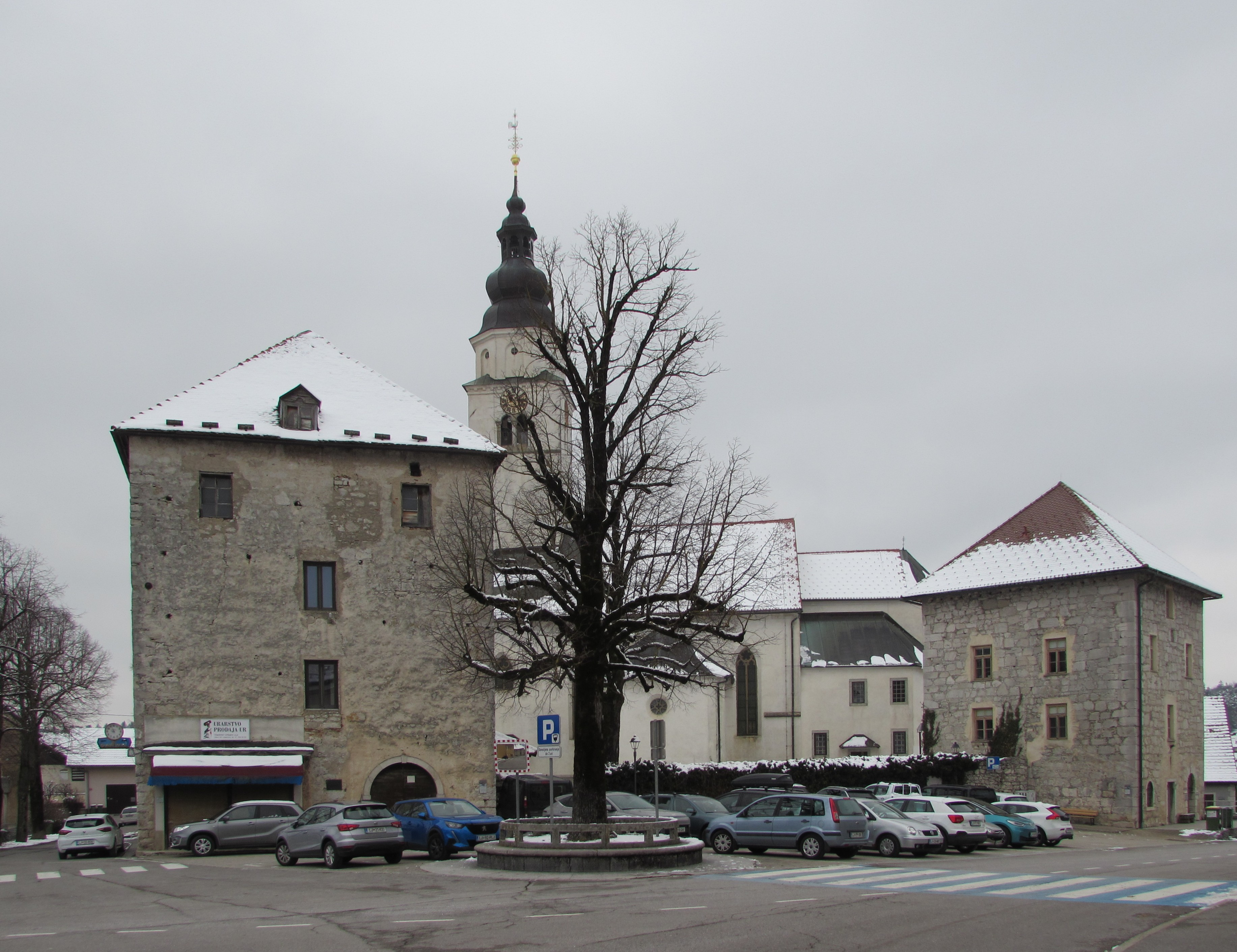
- From top, left to right: Cerknica skyline, St. John the Baptist's church, Gerbič house, Musical school, Kravanja House, Nativity of Mary church and Tabor

- Flag Coat of arms

- Location in Slovenia
- Coordinates: 45°47′47″N 14°21′29″E
- Country: Slovenia
- Traditional region: Inner Carniola
- Statistical region: Littoral–Inner Carniola
- Municipality: Cerknica

Area
  - Total: 14.8 km^{2} (5.7 sq mi)
- Elevation: 558.8 m (1,833 ft)

Population (2024)
  - Total: 4,131
  - Density: 279/km^{2} (723/sq mi)
- Postal code: 1380 Cerknica
- Vehicle registration: LJ
- Climate: Cfb

Cerknica (pronounced [ˈtsèːɾknitsa]; Italian: Circonio, German: Zirknitz) is a town in the Karst region of southwestern Slovenia, with a population of 4,131 (2024 census). It is the seat of the Municipality of Cerknica. It belongs to the traditional region of Inner Carniola.

== Name ==
Cerknica was first attested in written sources as Circhinitz in 1040 (and as Czirknicz in 1145, Cyrknitz in 1261, and Cirnizza in 1581). The name is derived from *Cerkvnica, a univerbation of *Cerkvna (vas) 'church village'. A church was established very early in Cerknica, probably already in the 9th century. The original structure was burned down in an Ottoman attack in 1472.

== Churches ==
There are three churches in Cerknica. The parish church is dedicated to the Nativity of Mary. It stands at the top of a hill in the center of Cerknica at the site of a former fortification against Ottoman raids. It is a late Gothic hall church, a triple-naved structure with lierne vaulting built between 1480 and 1520 at the site of an earlier church that was burned during an Ottoman attack in 1472. A Baroque chapel was added to the church in the 18th century and the church's furnishings date from the 19th century.

The other two churches are chapels of ease dedicated to John the Baptist and Saint Roch. Saint John the Baptist Church is a cemetery church south of the main settlement. A chapel was mentioned at the site in a visitation report of 1581; the church itself was built in 1642. It has a rectangular nave, a polygonal chancel walled on three sides, and a bell tower. The interior combines groin vaulting and barrel vaulting with spandrels. Saint Roch's Church stands in the northern part of Cerknica. It was built between 1630 and 1644 at the site of a plague chapel dating to 1578. It has a rectangular nave, a polygonal chancel walled on three sides, and a bell tower. The altar painting of Saint Roch is a 1763 work by Anton Cebej.

Historical population
| Year | Pop. | ±% |
|---|---|---|
| 1948 | 1,210 | — |
| 1953 | 1,404 | +16.0% |
| 1961 | 1,716 | +22.2% |
| 1971 | 2,295 | +33.7% |
| 1981 | 3,148 | +37.2% |
| 1991 | 3,446 | +9.5% |
| 2002 | 3,532 | +2.5% |
| 2011 | 3,928 | +11.2% |
| 2021 | 4,022 | +2.4% |
Population size may be affected by changes in administrative divisions.

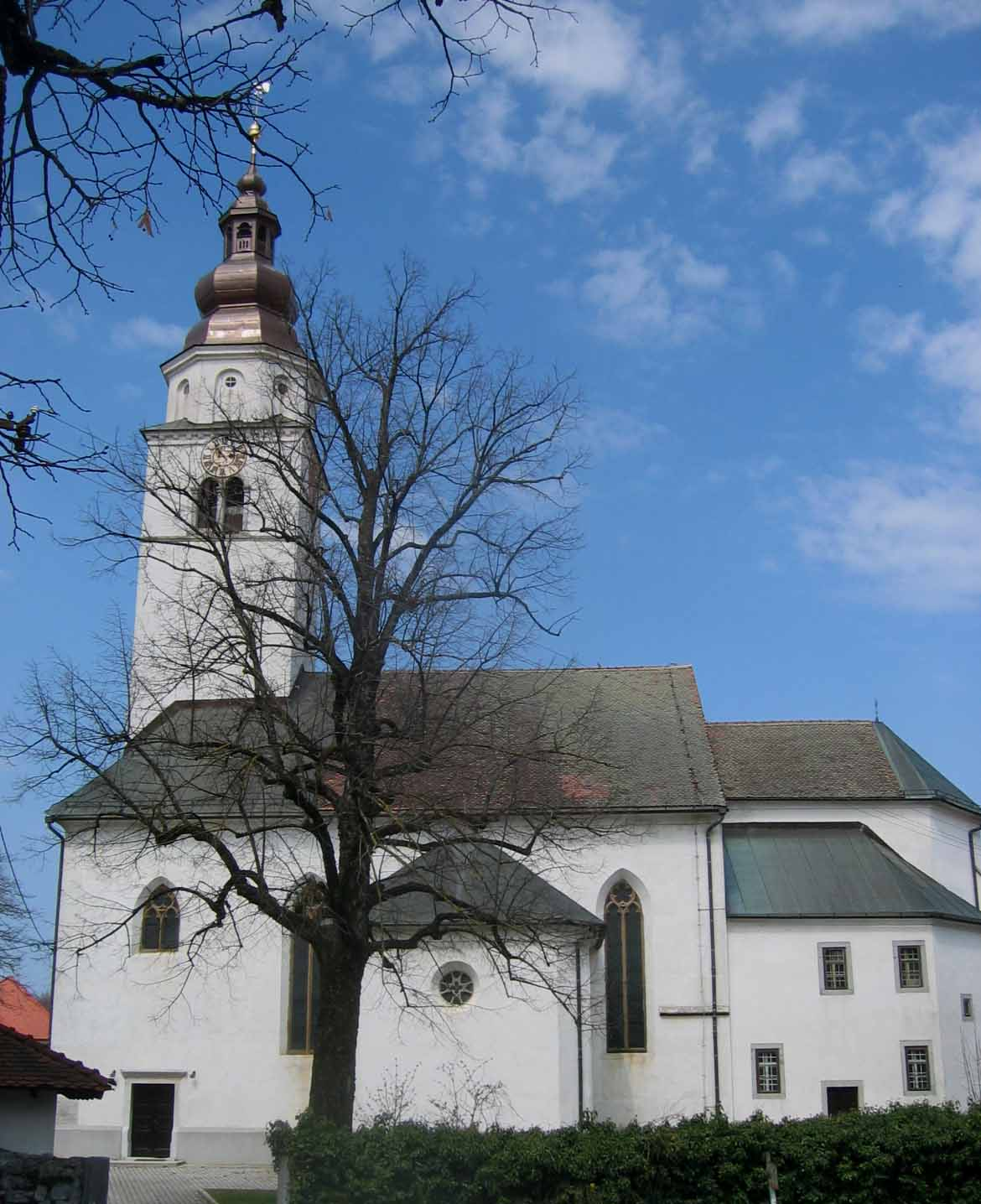
Nativity of Mary Church

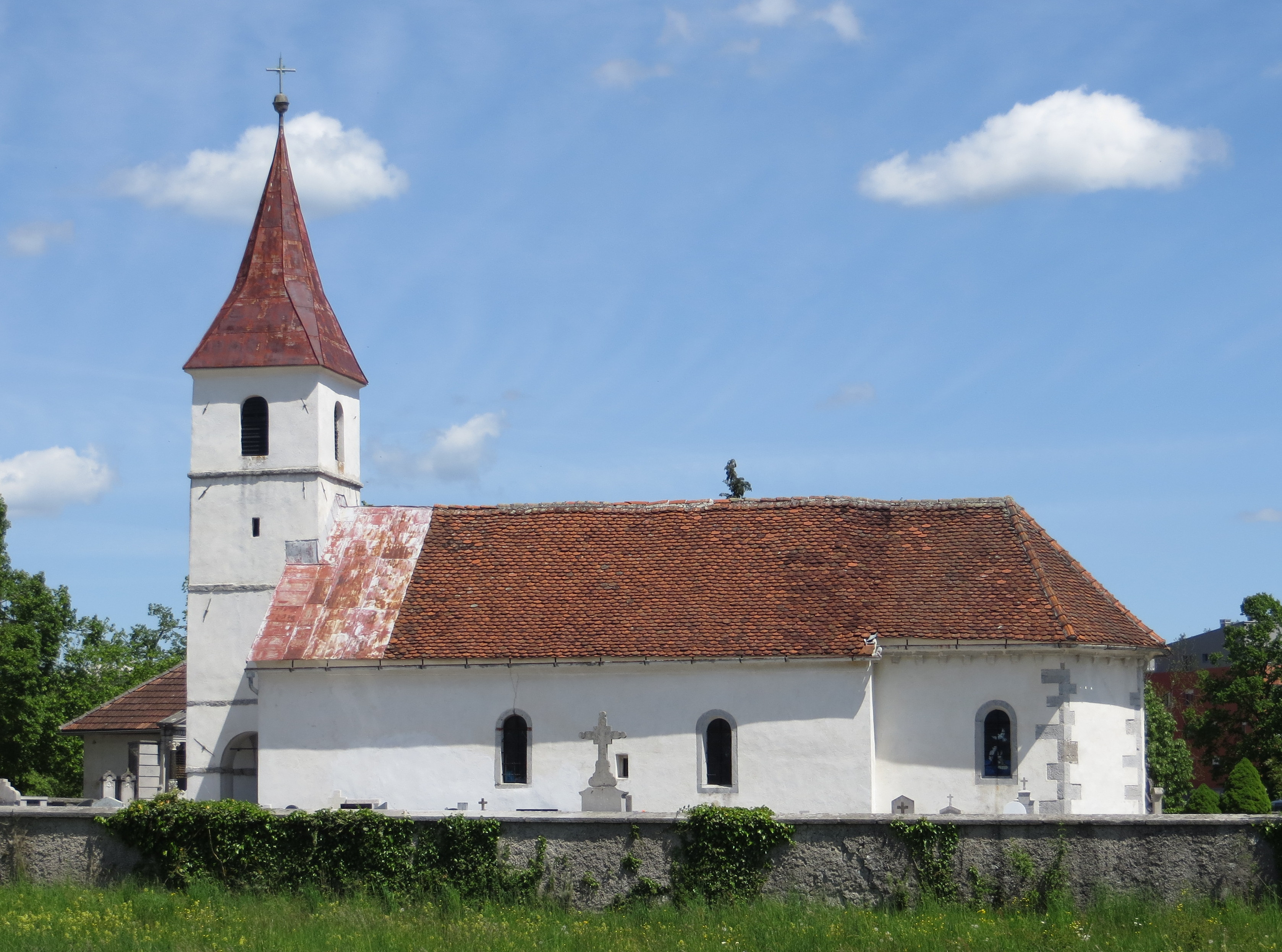
Saint John the Baptist Church

== Notable people ==
Notable people that were born or lived in Cerknica include:

- France Arhar (born 1948), banker and politician
- Jože Udovič (1912–1986), poet
- Antonija Premrov (1912–1949), nurse, organist, choirmaster, martyr, victim of Communism and Servant of God

== Twin town ==
- Kispest, Hungary (2024)
