= Boltija =

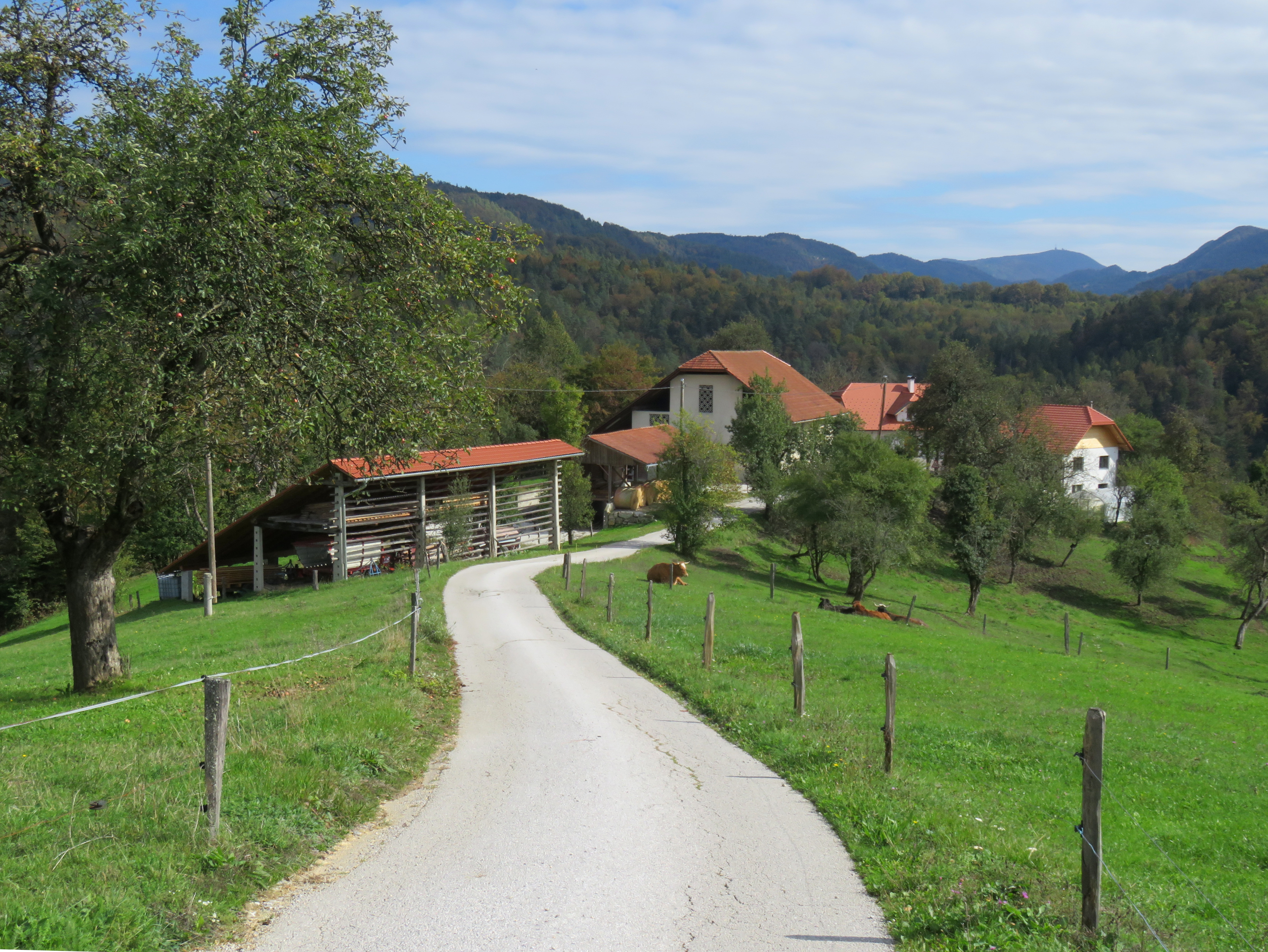

- Location in Slovenia
- Coordinates: 46°5′36.86″N 14°51′15.29″E
- Country: Slovenia
- Traditional region: Upper Carniola
- Statistical region: Central Sava
- Municipality: Litija

Area
  - Total: 1.1 km^{2} (0.42 sq mi)
- Elevation: 357.2 m (1,172 ft)

Population (2002)
  - Total: 24
- Postal code: 1252

Boltija (pronounced [bɔlˈtiːja]) is a dispersed settlement in the Municipality of Litija in central Slovenia. The area is part of the traditional region of Upper Carniola. It is now included with the rest of the municipality in the Central Sava Statistical Region; until January 2014 the municipality was part of the Central Slovenia Statistical Region.

== Name ==
Boltija was attested in written sources as Zaboli in 1444.

== Cultural heritage ==
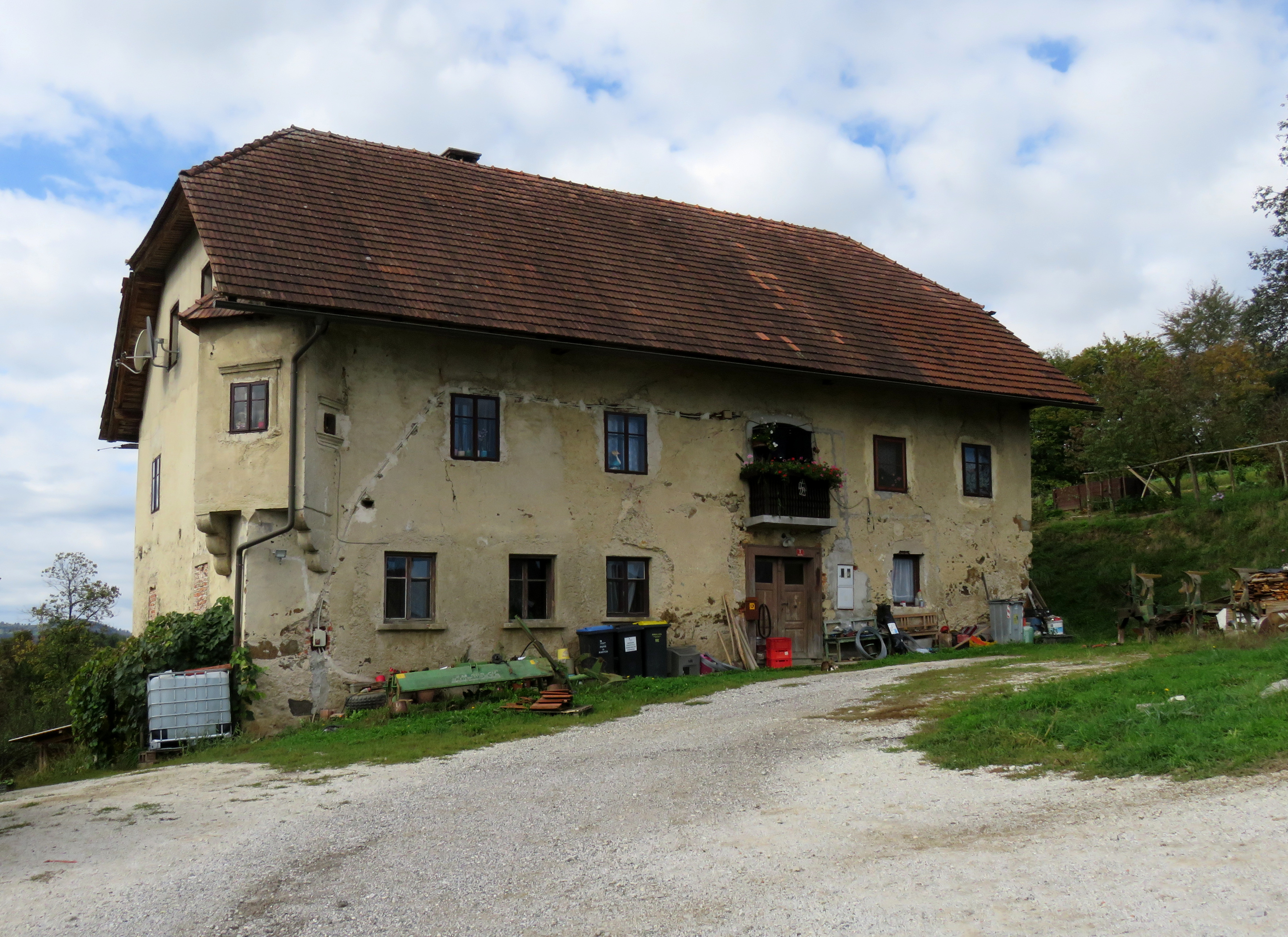
Waldhof Manor

Waldhof Manor, also known as Boltija Manor (Slovene: gradič Boltija), stands in the southwestern part of the village. It is a two-story structure with a rectangular layout that was originally the residence of a manor farm for Ponoviče Castle. The building was reworked into a manor house in the 17th century. The projecting corner bay on a stone console with a Renaissance window is probably an older feature from the beginning of the 16th century.
