= Veliki Vrh pri Litiji =

- Location in Slovenia
- Coordinates: 46°3′52.61″N 14°48′10.36″E
- Country: Slovenia
- Traditional region: Lower Carniola
- Statistical region: Central Sava
- Municipality: Litija

Area
  - Total: 3.04 km^{2} (1.17 sq mi)
- Elevation: 419.2 m (1,375 ft)

Population (2002)
  - Total: 137
- Postal code: 1270

Veliki Vrh pri Litiji (pronounced [ˈʋeːliki ˈʋəɾx pɾi liˈtiːji]) is a settlement in the hills above the right bank of the Sava River west of Litija in central Slovenia. The area is part of the traditional region of Lower Carniola and is now included with the rest of the municipality in the Central Sava Statistical Region.

== Name ==
The name of the settlement was changed from Veliki Vrh to Veliki Vrh pri Litiji in 1953.
