= Magolnik =

- Location in Slovenia
- Coordinates: 46°3′22.39″N 15°3′15.4″E
- Country: Slovenia
- Traditional region: Lower Carniola
- Statistical region: Central Sava
- Municipality: Litija

Area
  - Total: 0.49 km^{2} (0.19 sq mi)
- Elevation: 656.5 m (2,154 ft)

Population (2002)
  - Total: 23
- Postal code: 1414

Magolnik (pronounced [ˈmaːɡɔlnik]) is a small settlement in the hills northeast of Dole in the Municipality of Litija in central Slovenia. The area is part of the traditional region of Lower Carniola. It is now included with the rest of the municipality in the Central Sava Statistical Region.

== History ==
Magolnik was a hamlet of Dobovica until 1995, when it became a separate settlement.
