= Laze pri Vačah =

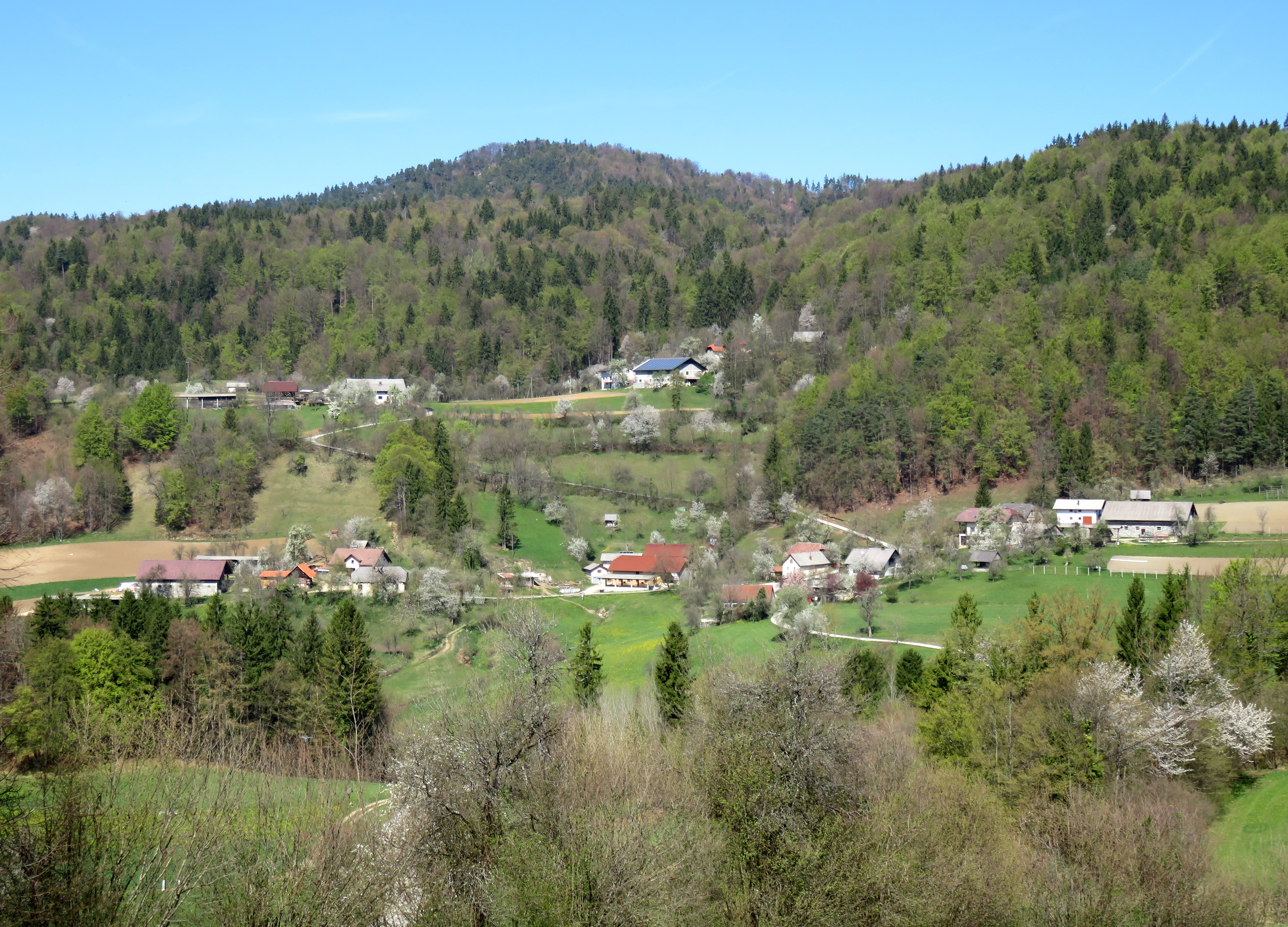

- Location in Slovenia
- Coordinates: 46°7′7″N 14°52′35.17″E
- Country: Slovenia
- Traditional region: Upper Carniola
- Statistical region: Central Sava
- Municipality: Litija

Area
  - Total: 1 km^{2} (0.39 sq mi)
- Elevation: 451.1 m (1,480 ft)

Population (2002)
  - Total: 38
- Postal code: 1252

Laze pri Vačah (pronounced [ˈlaːzɛ pɾi ˈʋaːtʃax]; German: Lase) is a small settlement east of Vače in the Municipality of Litija in central Slovenia. The area is part of the traditional region of Upper Carniola. It is now included with the rest of the municipality in the Central Sava Statistical Region.

== Name ==
The name of the settlement was changed from Laze to Laze pri Vačah in 1955.
