= Širmanski Hrib =

- Location in Slovenia
- Coordinates: 46°3′15.99″N 14°48′0.72″E
- Country: Slovenia
- Traditional region: Lower Carniola
- Statistical region: Central Sava
- Municipality: Litija

Area
  - Total: 3 km^{2} (1.2 sq mi)
- Elevation: 344.8 m (1,131 ft)

Population (2002)
  - Total: 19
- Postal code: 1270

Širmanski Hrib (pronounced [ˈʃiːɾmanski ˈxɾiːp]; German: Schirmansberg) is a dispersed settlement in the hills west of Litija in central Slovenia. The area is part of the traditional region of Lower Carniola. It is now included with the rest of the municipality in the Central Sava Statistical Region.
