= Borovak pri Polšniku =

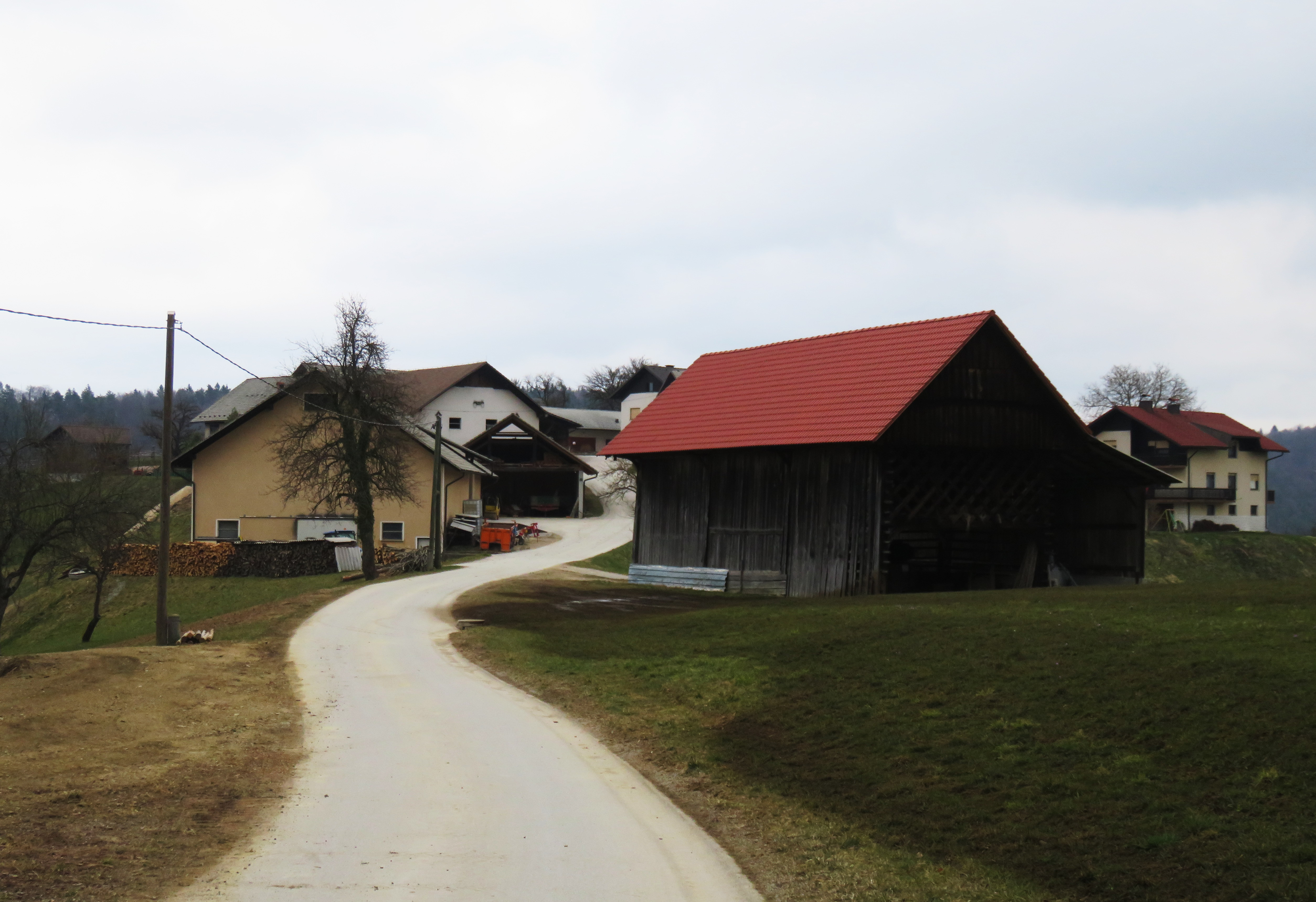

- Location in Slovenia
- Coordinates: 46°2′44.85″N 14°58′15.79″E
- Country: Slovenia
- Traditional region: Lower Carniola
- Statistical region: Central Sava
- Municipality: Litija

Area
  - Total: 1.27 km^{2} (0.49 sq mi)
- Elevation: 749.7 m (2,460 ft)

Population (2002)
  - Total: 24
- Postal code: 1272

Borovak pri Polšniku (pronounced [bɔɾɔˈʋaːk pɾi ˈpoːu̯ʃniku]) is a small settlement in the Municipality of Litija in central Slovenia. The area is part of the traditional region of Lower Carniola. It is now included with the rest of the municipality in the Central Sava Statistical Region; until January 2014 the municipality was part of the Central Slovenia Statistical Region.

== Name ==
Borovak pri Polšniku was attested in written sources as Borauackh in 1499. The name of the settlement was changed from Borovak to Borovak pri Polšniku in 1955.
