= Gornje Ravne =

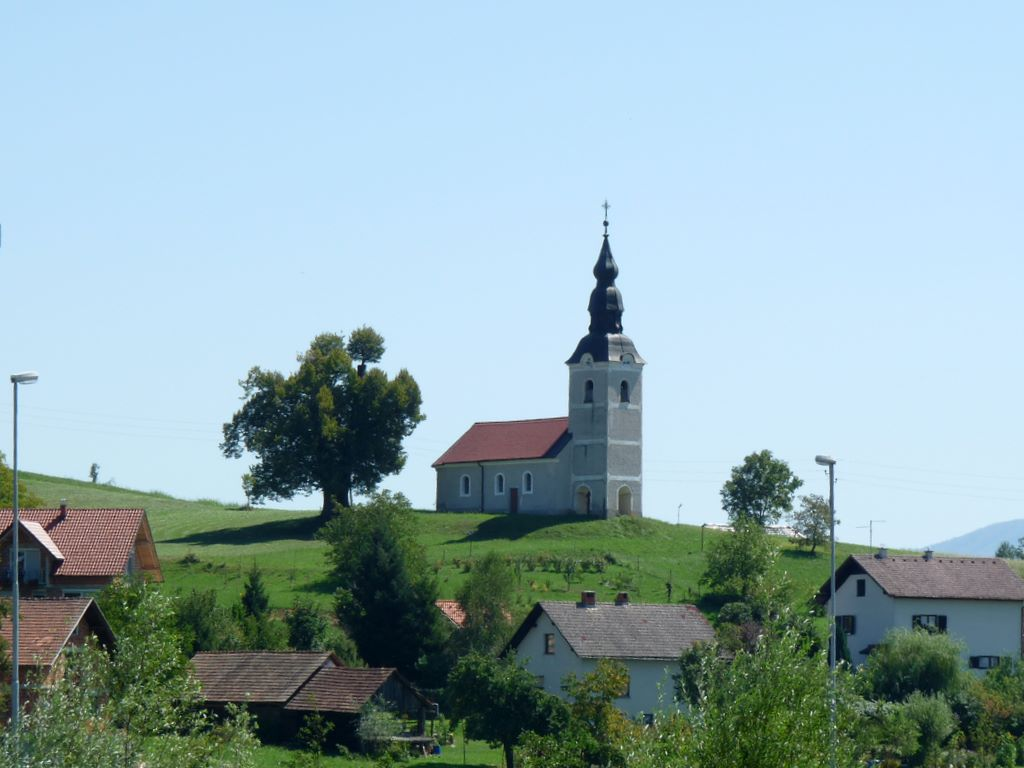

- Location in Slovenia
- Coordinates: 45°58′6.94″N 14°59′36.75″E
- Country: Slovenia
- Traditional region: Lower Carniola
- Statistical region: Central Sava
- Municipality: Litija

Area
  - Total: 1.83 km^{2} (0.71 sq mi)
- Elevation: 381.9 m (1,253 ft)

Population (2002)
  - Total: 16
- Postal code: 1274

Gornje Ravne (pronounced [ˈɡóːɾnjɛ ˈɾáːwnɛ]) is a small settlement in the Municipality of Litija in central Slovenia. The area is part of the traditional region of Lower Carniola. It is now included with the rest of the municipality in the Central Sava Statistical Region; until January 2014 the municipality was part of the Central Slovenia Statistical Region.
