= Široka Set =

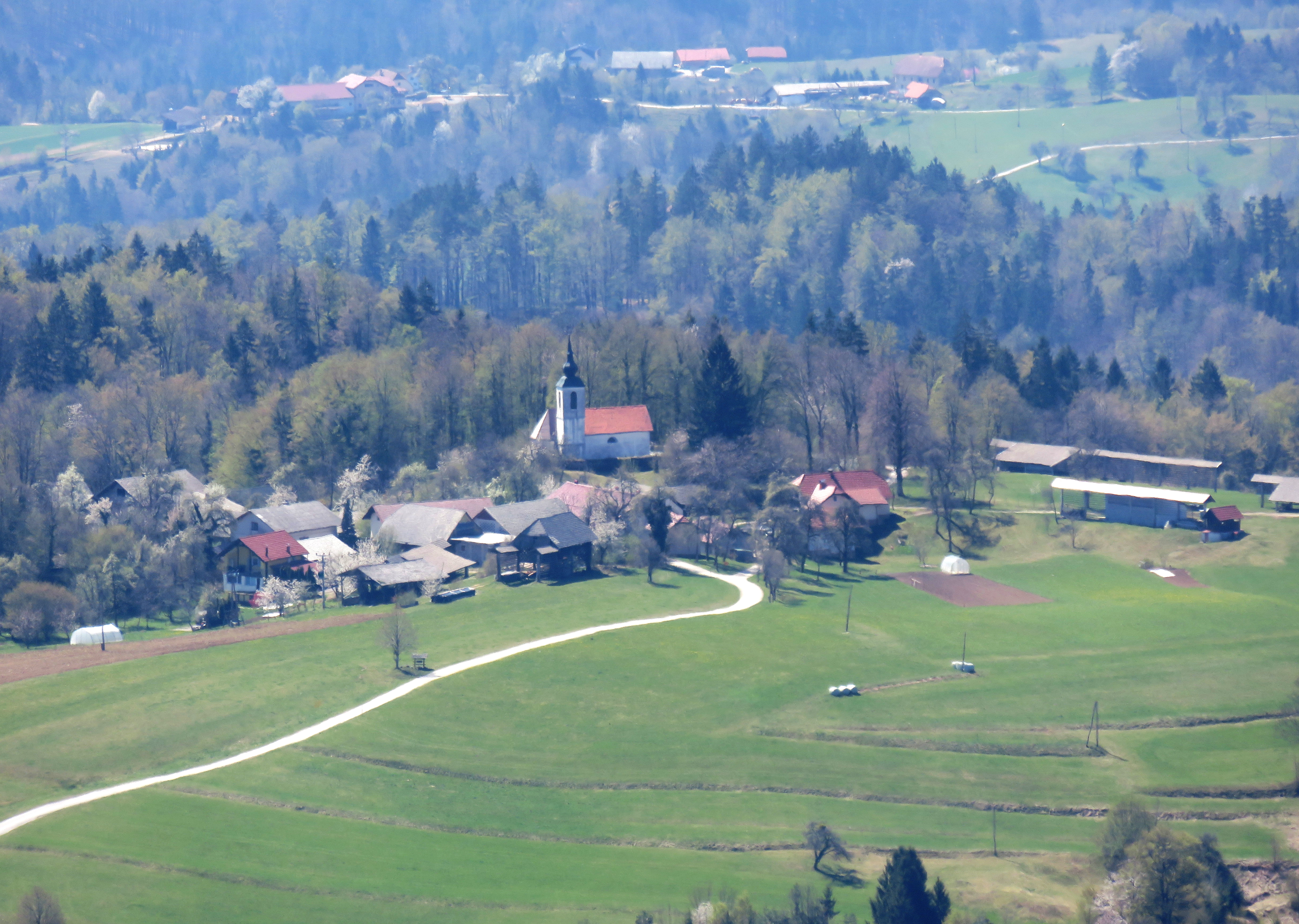

- Location in Slovenia
- Coordinates: 46°6′34.61″N 14°52′35.24″E
- Country: Slovenia
- Traditional region: Upper Carniola
- Statistical region: Central Sava
- Municipality: Litija

Area
  - Total: 1.37 km^{2} (0.53 sq mi)
- Elevation: 541 m (1,775 ft)

Population (2002)
  - Total: 24
- Postal code: 1252

Široka Set (pronounced [ʃiˈɾɔːka ˈseːt]; German: Breitensaat) is a small village east of Vače in the Municipality of Litija in central Slovenia. The area is part of the traditional region of Upper Carniola. It is now included with the rest of the municipality in the Central Sava Statistical Region.

== Church ==
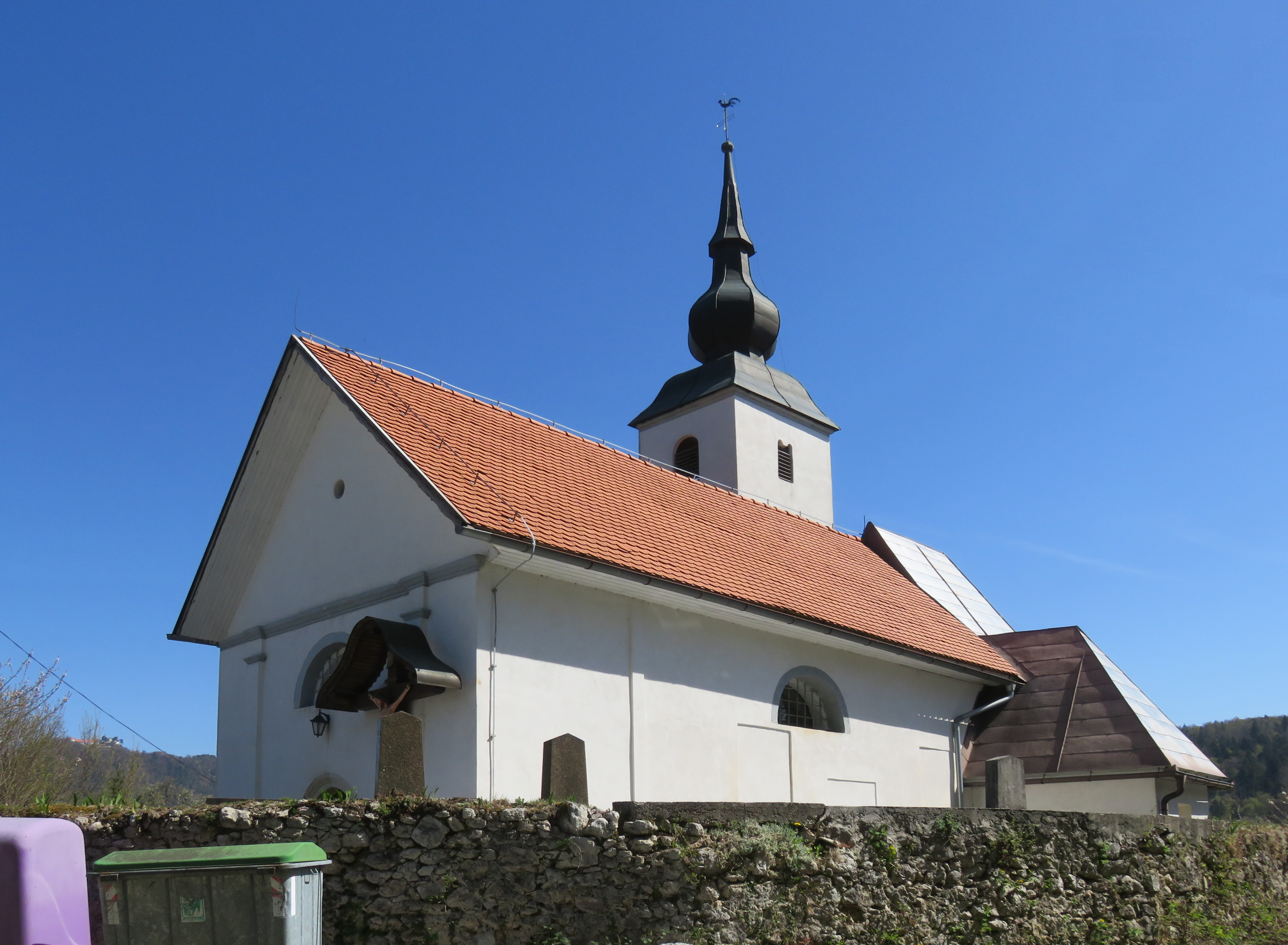
Saint Margaret's Church

The local church is dedicated to Saint Margaret and belongs to the Parish of Vače. It was originally a Gothic church that was restyled in the Baroque in the 18th century.
