= Berinjek =

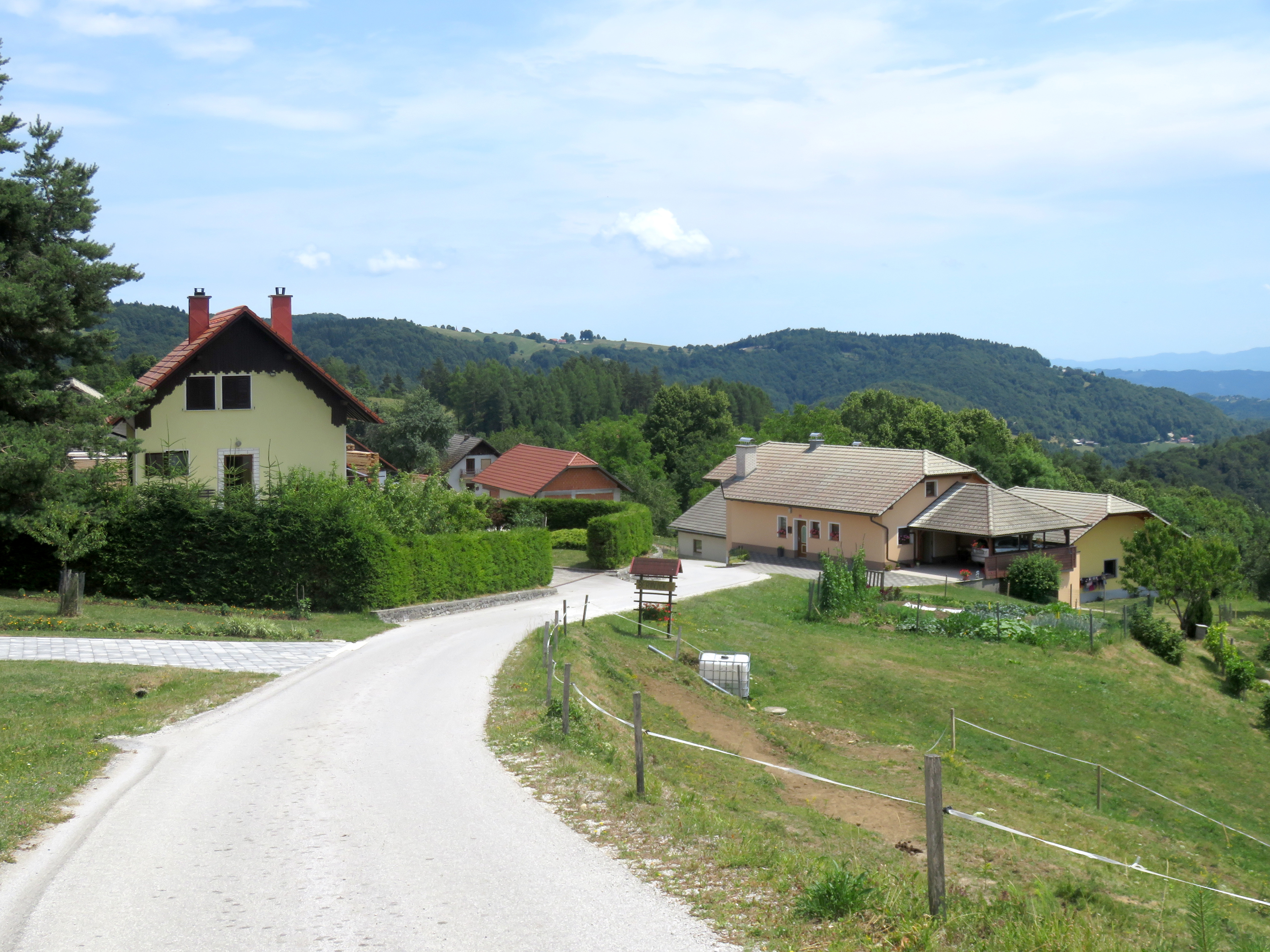

- Location in Slovenia
- Coordinates: 46°2′3.38″N 15°1′50.67″E
- Country: Slovenia
- Traditional region: Lower Carniola
- Statistical region: Central Sava
- Municipality: Litija

Area
  - Total: 1.3 km^{2} (0.50 sq mi)
- Elevation: 742.8 m (2,437 ft)
- Postal code: 1273

Berinjek (pronounced [bɛˈɾiːnjɛk]) is a small settlement in the Municipality of Litija in central Slovenia. The area is part of the traditional region of Lower Carniola. It is now included with the rest of the municipality in the Central Sava Statistical Region; until January 2014 the municipality was part of the Central Slovenia Statistical Region.

== Name ==
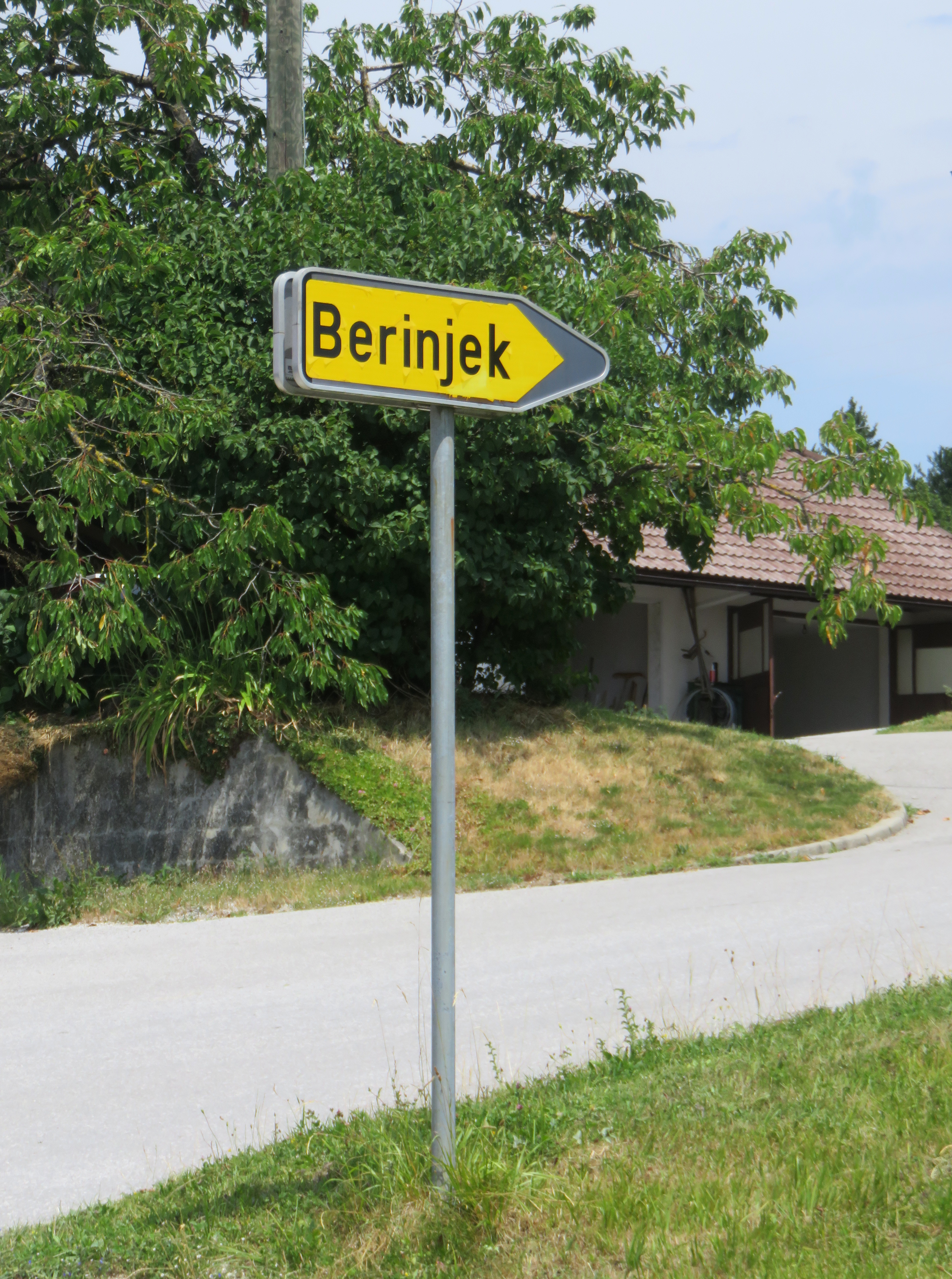
Sign for Berinjek

Berinjek was attested in historical documents as Berynak and Perinakch in 1420, and as Wernekg in 1463, among other spellings.

== History ==
Berinjek was a hamlet of Suhadole until 1995, when it was made a separate settlement.
