= Dolgo Brdo, Litija =

Dolgo Brdo
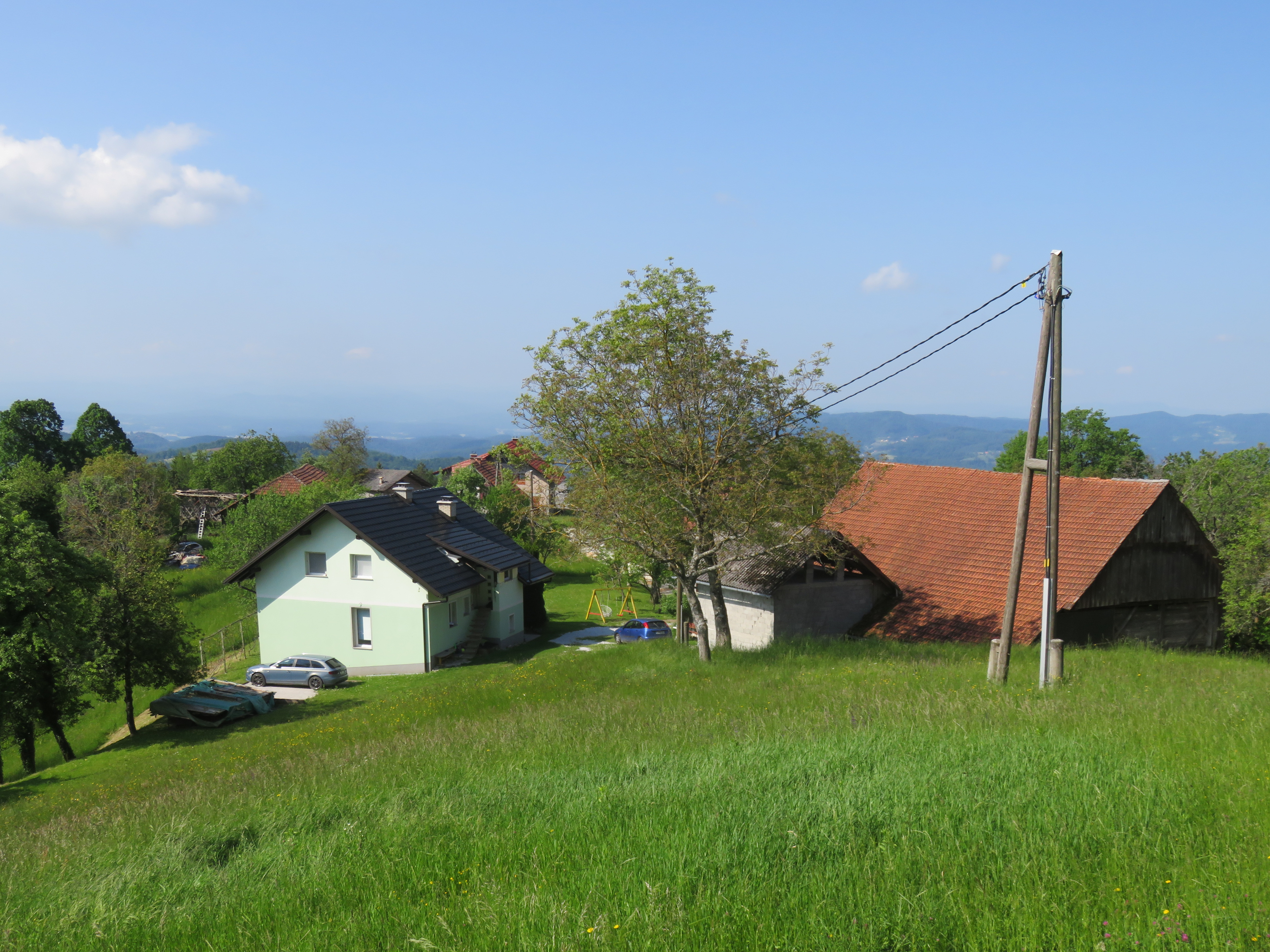

- Location in Slovenia
- Coordinates: 46°2′56.77″N 14°55′38.54″E
- Country: Slovenia
- Traditional region: Lower Carniola
- Statistical region: Central Sava
- Municipality: Litija

Area
  - Total: 2.44 km^{2} (0.94 sq mi)
- Elevation: 753.3 m (2,471 ft)

Population (2002)
  - Total: 27
- Postal code: 1272

Dolgo Brdo (pronounced [ˈdoːu̯ɡɔ ˈbəɾdɔ]; German: Langeneck) is a small settlement in the Municipality of Litija in central Slovenia. The area is part of the traditional region of Lower Carniola. It is now included with the rest of the municipality in the Central Sava Statistical Region; until January 2014 the municipality was part of the Central Slovenia Statistical Region.

== Geography ==
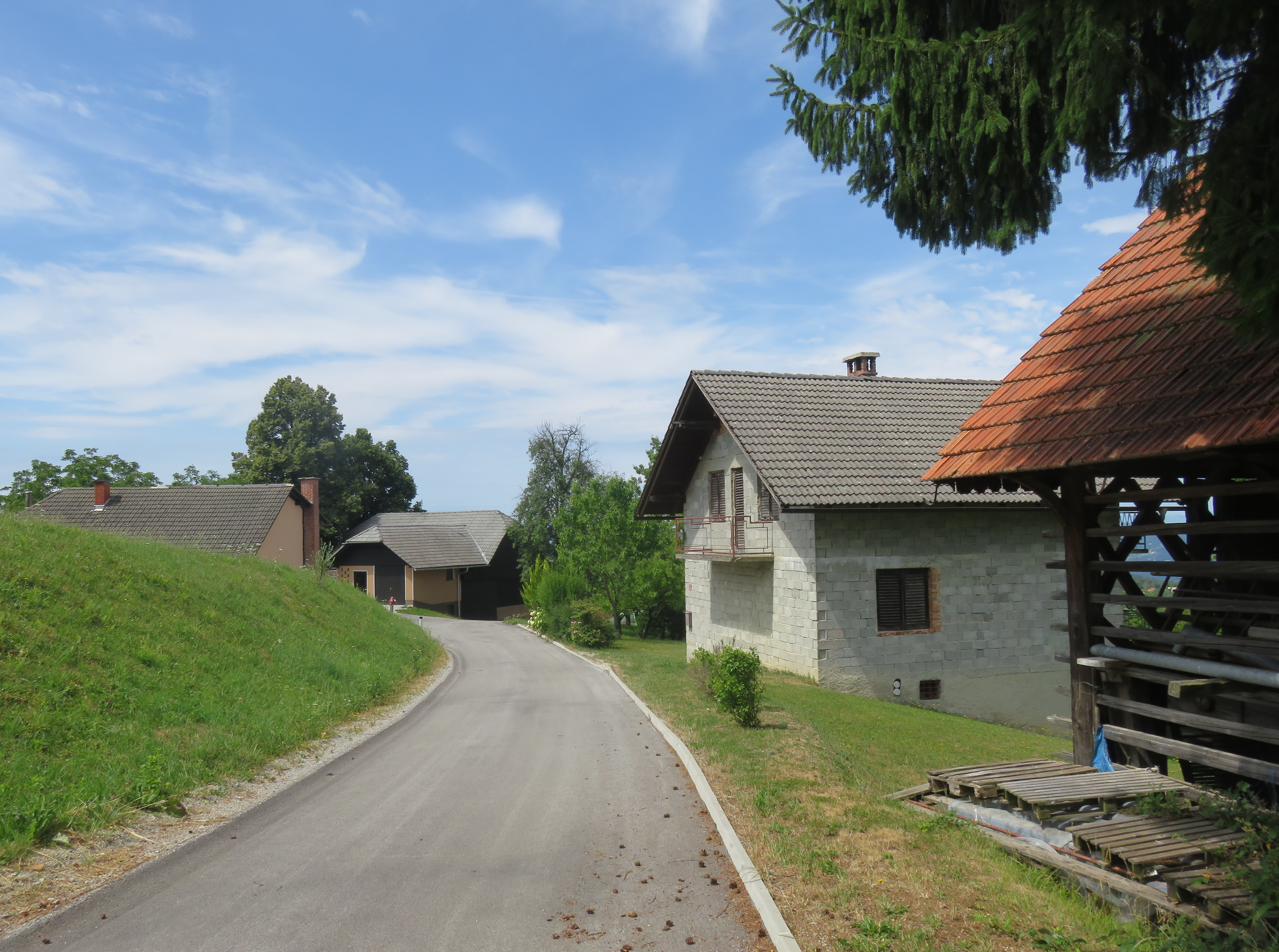
Prelesje

Dolgo Brdo is a scattered settlement in the southern part of the Polšnik Hills (Slovene: Polšniški hribi). Izerca Hill (elevation: 801 meters or 2,628 feet) rises above the settlement, and Žrjavec Hill (a.k.a. Čerjavec Hill; elevation: 854 meters or 2,802 feet) stands to the east. Dolgo Brdo includes the hamlet of Prelesje northwest of the center of the village.
