= Kržišče pri Čatežu =

- Location in Slovenia
- Coordinates: 45°58′49.66″N 14°57′10.85″E
- Country: Slovenia
- Traditional region: Lower Carniola
- Statistical region: Central Sava
- Municipality: Litija

Area
  - Total: 0.47 km^{2} (0.18 sq mi)
- Elevation: 473.9 m (1,555 ft)

Population (2002)
  - Total: 15
- Postal code: 1274

Kržišče pri Čatežu (pronounced [kəɾˈʒiːʃtʃɛ pɾi ˈtʃaːtɛʒu]) is a small settlement in the Municipality of Litija in central Slovenia. It lies just north of Čatež. The area is part of the traditional region of Lower Carniola. It is now included with the rest of the municipality in the Central Sava Statistical Region.

== Name ==
The name of the settlement was changed from Kržišče to Kržišče pri Čatežu in 1955.
