= Moravška Gora =

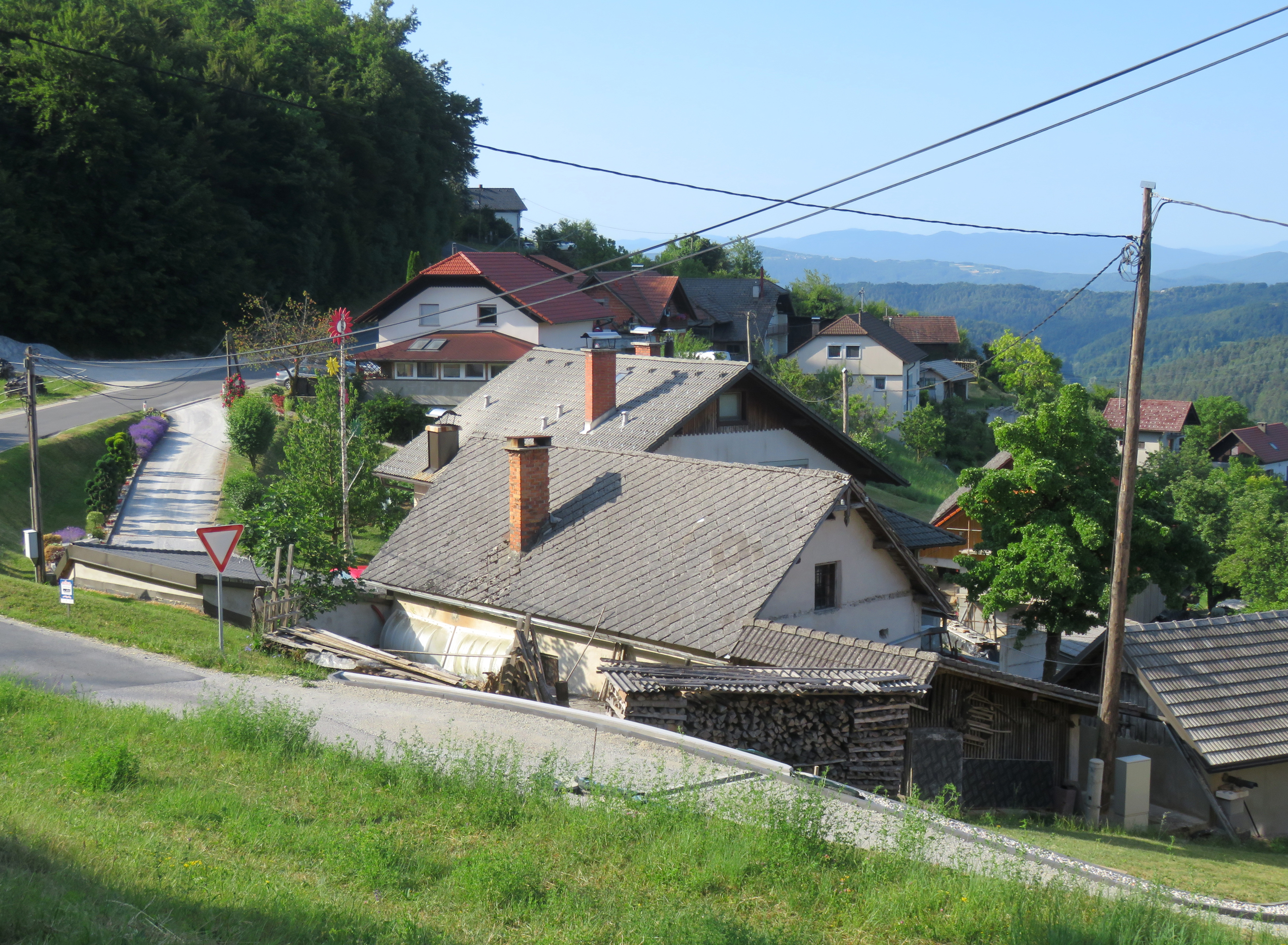

- Location in Slovenia
- Coordinates: 46°0′26.55″N 14°59′17.21″E
- Country: Slovenia
- Traditional region: Lower Carniola
- Statistical region: Central Sava
- Municipality: Litija

Area
  - Total: 1.27 km^{2} (0.49 sq mi)
- Elevation: 549.9 m (1,804 ft)

Population (2002)
  - Total: 83
- Postal code: 1274

Moravška Gora (pronounced [mɔˈɾaːu̯ʃka ˈɡɔːɾa]; German: Moräutschberg) is a settlement immediately north of Gabrovka in the Municipality of Litija in central Slovenia. The area is part of the traditional region of Lower Carniola. It is now included with the rest of the municipality in the Central Sava Statistical Region.
