= Podbukovje pri Vačah =

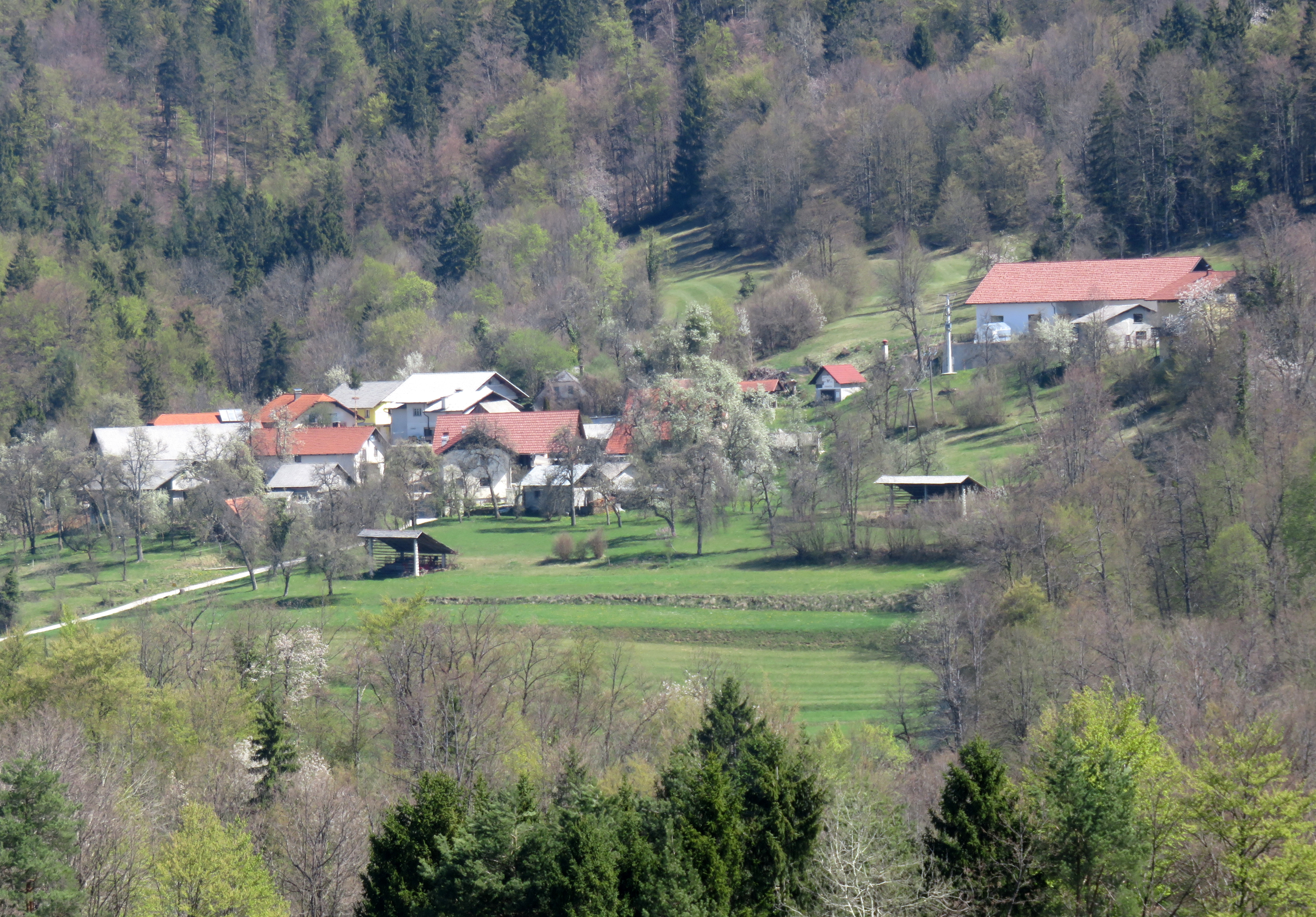

- Location in Slovenia
- Coordinates: 46°7′1.21″N 14°53′13.38″E
- Country: Slovenia
- Traditional region: Upper Carniola
- Statistical region: Central Sava
- Municipality: Litija

Area
  - Total: 1.54 km^{2} (0.59 sq mi)
- Elevation: 525.9 m (1,725 ft)

Population (2002)
  - Total: 31
- Postal code: 1252

Podbukovje pri Vačah (pronounced [pɔdˈbuːkɔu̯jɛ pɾi ˈʋaːtʃax]) is a small settlement east of Vače in the Municipality of Litija in central Slovenia. The area is part of the traditional region of Upper Carniola. It is now included with the rest of the municipality in the Central Sava Statistical Region.

== Name ==
The name of the settlement was changed from Podbukovje to Podbukovje pri Vačah in 1953.
