= Mala Goba =

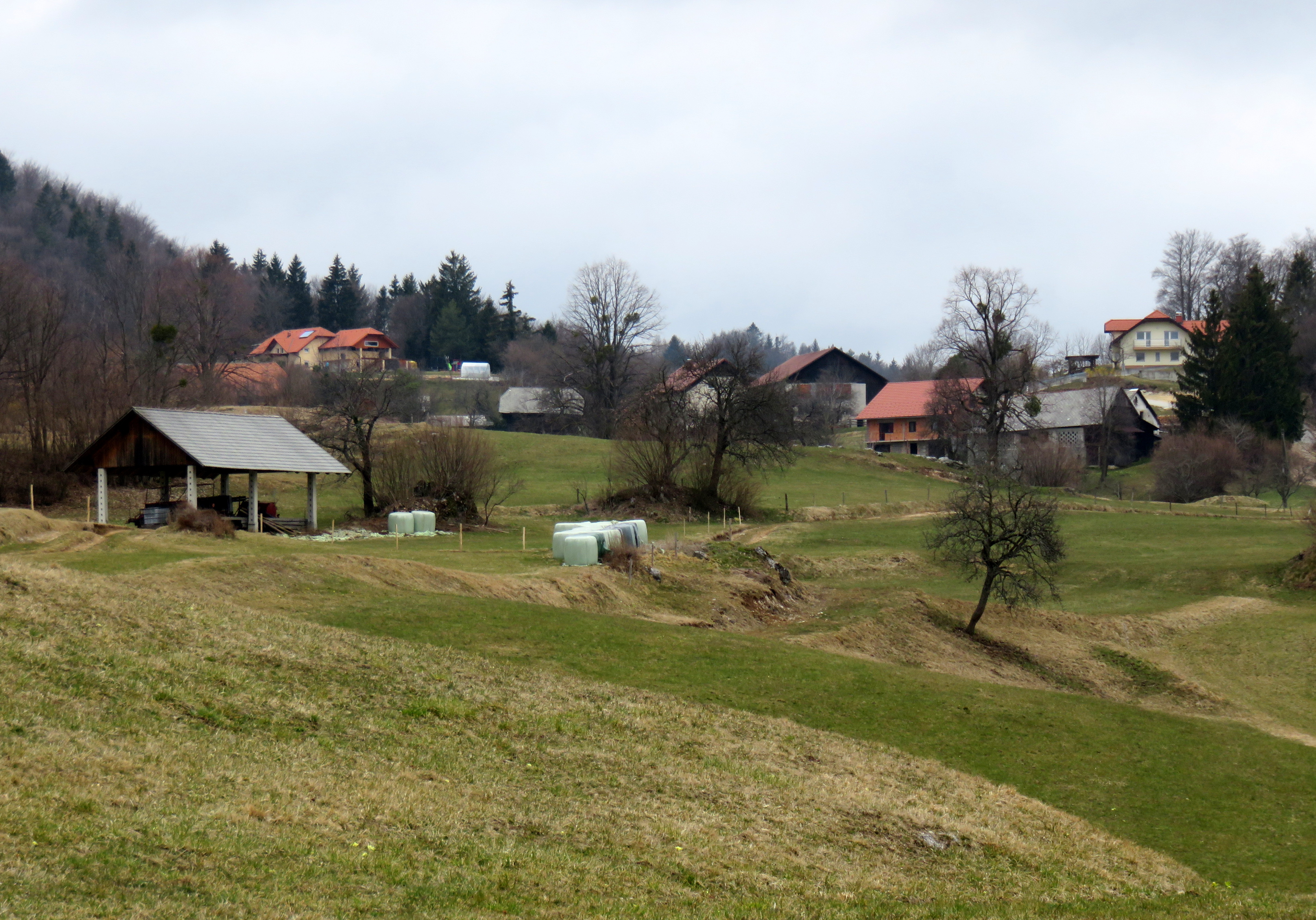

- Location in Slovenia
- Coordinates: 46°2′22.18″N 14°58′46.03″E
- Country: Slovenia
- Traditional region: Lower Carniola
- Statistical region: Central Sava
- Municipality: Litija

Area
  - Total: 0.97 km^{2} (0.37 sq mi)
- Elevation: 723 m (2,372 ft)

Population (2002)
  - Total: 20
- Postal code: 1273

Mala Goba (pronounced [ˈmaːla ˈɡoːba]; German: Kleingoba) is a small settlement north of Gabrovka in the Municipality of Litija in central Slovenia. The area is part of the traditional region of Lower Carniola. It is now included with the rest of the municipality in the Central Sava Statistical Region.

== Name ==
Mala Goba was attested in written sources as Schwainperg in 1406, Panperg in 1444, and Klein Schbamberg in 1499.
