= Konj, Litija =

Konj
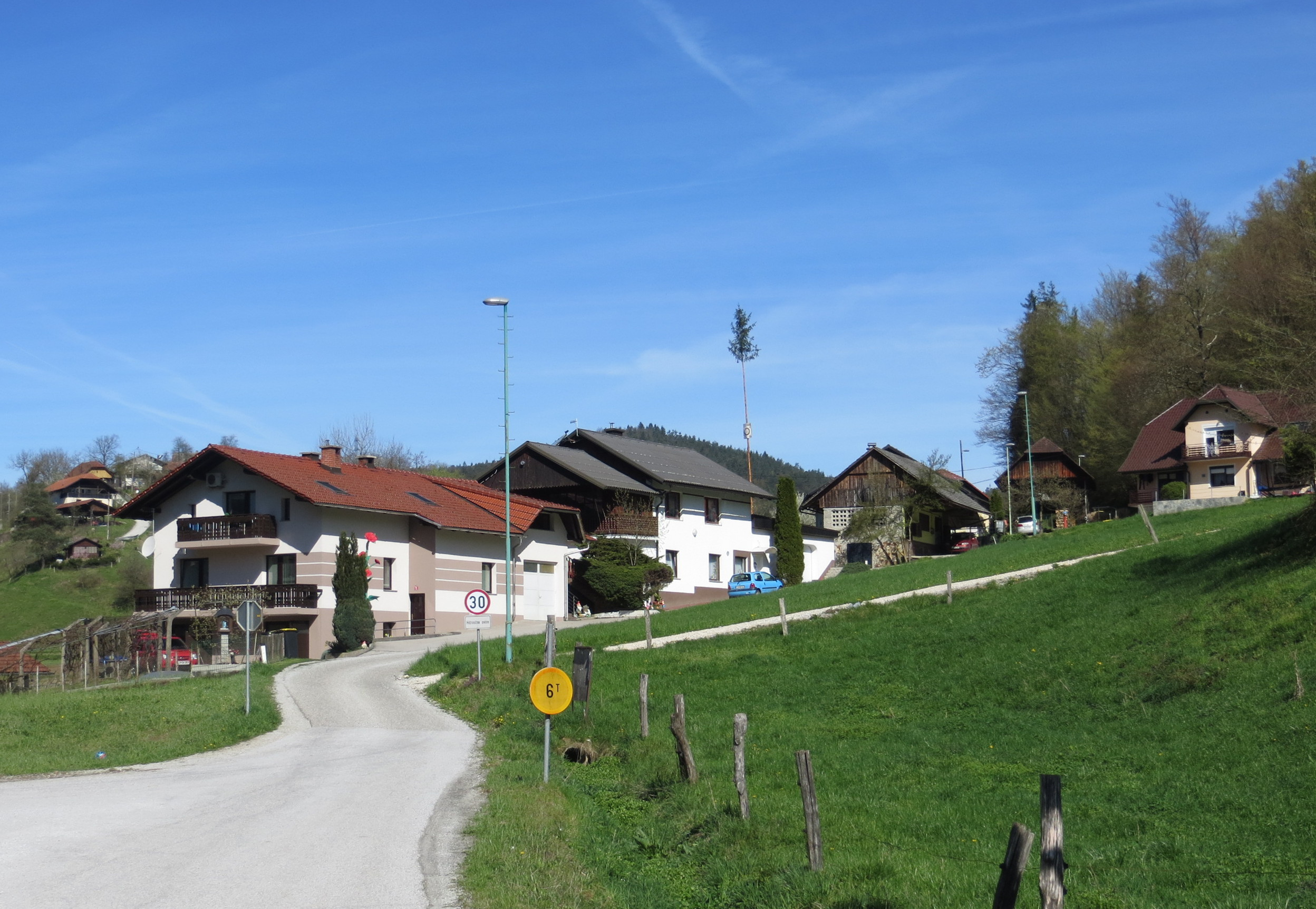

- Location in Slovenia
- Coordinates: 46°5′23.52″N 14°50′32.5″E
- Country: Slovenia
- Traditional region: Upper Carniola
- Statistical region: Central Sava
- Municipality: Litija

Area
  - Total: 1.6 km^{2} (0.62 sq mi)
- Elevation: 366.4 m (1,202 ft)

Population (2002)
  - Total: 89
- Postal code: 1270

Konj (pronounced [ˈkɔn]; German: Roßbüchel) is a dispersed settlement in the hills above the left bank of the Sava River in the Municipality of Litija in central Slovenia. The area is part of the traditional region of Upper Carniola. It is now included with the rest of the municipality in the Central Sava Statistical Region; until January 2014, the municipality was part of the Central Slovenia Statistical Region.
