= Velika Goba =

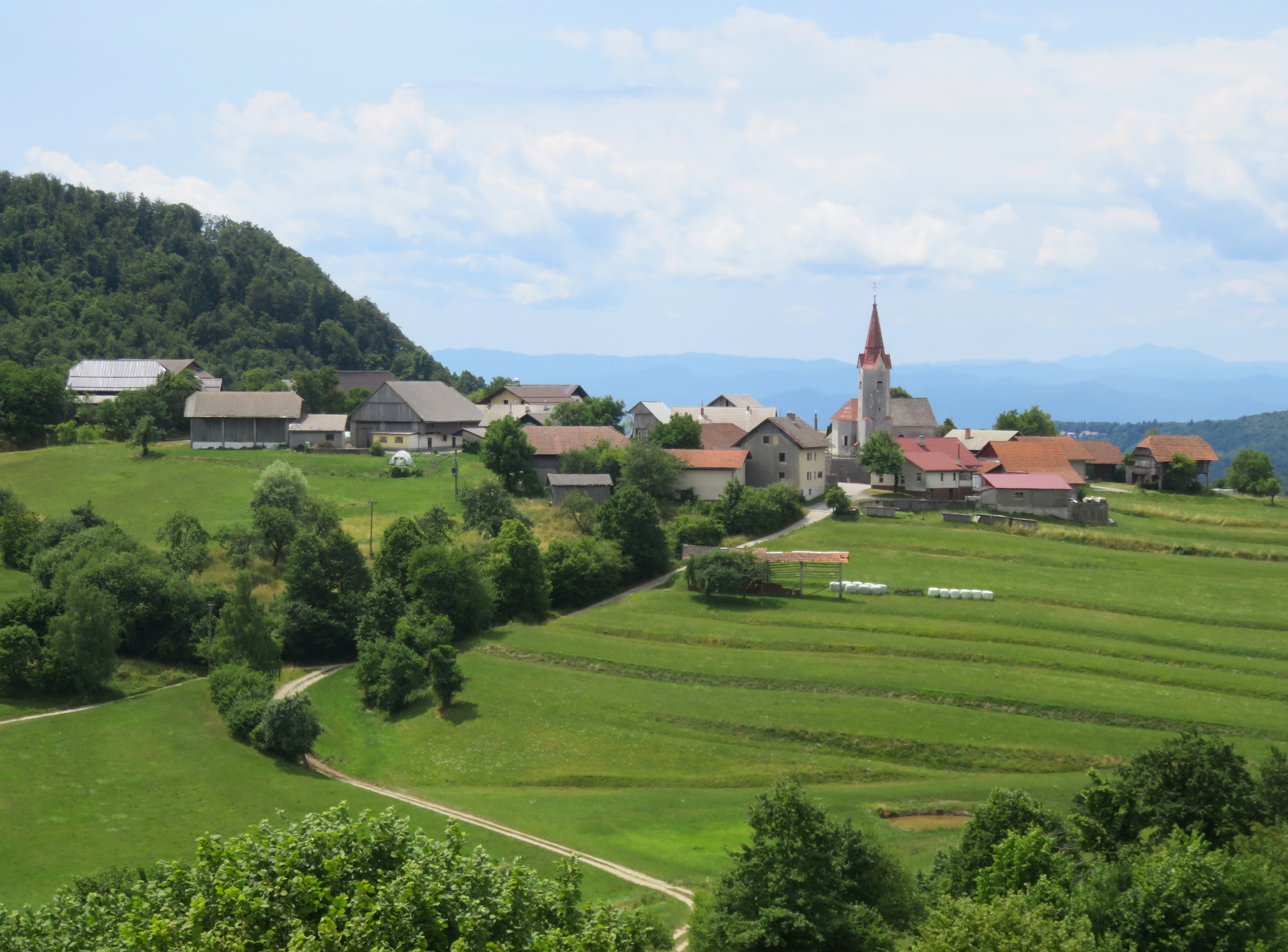

- Location in Slovenia
- Coordinates: 46°1′51.41″N 14°58′25.58″E
- Country: Slovenia
- Traditional region: Lower Carniola
- Statistical region: Central Sava
- Municipality: Litija

Area
  - Total: 2.12 km^{2} (0.82 sq mi)
- Elevation: 712.2 m (2,337 ft)

Population (2002)
  - Total: 38
- Postal code: 1273

Velika Goba (pronounced [ˈʋeːlika ˈɡoːba]; German: Großgoba) is a village west of Dole in the Municipality of Litija in central Slovenia. The area is part of the traditional region of Lower Carniola and is now included with the rest of the municipality in the Central Sava Statistical Region.

== Name ==
Velika Goba was attested in written sources as Schwainperg in 1406, Panperg in 1444, and Gross Schbamberg in 1499.

== Church ==
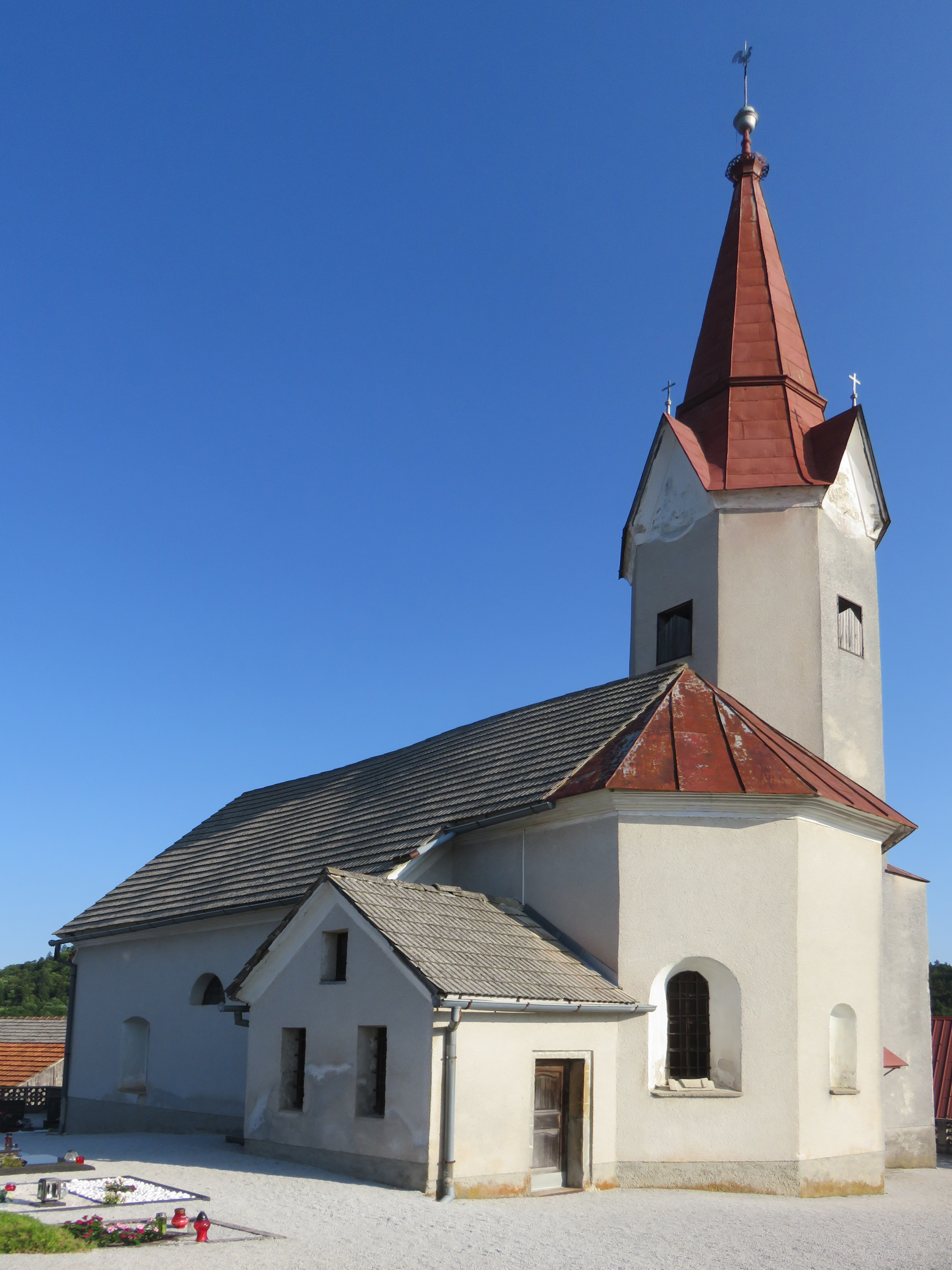
Archangel Michael Church

The local church is dedicated to Saint Michael and belongs to the Parish of Dole. It was built in the 18th century.
