= Golišče =

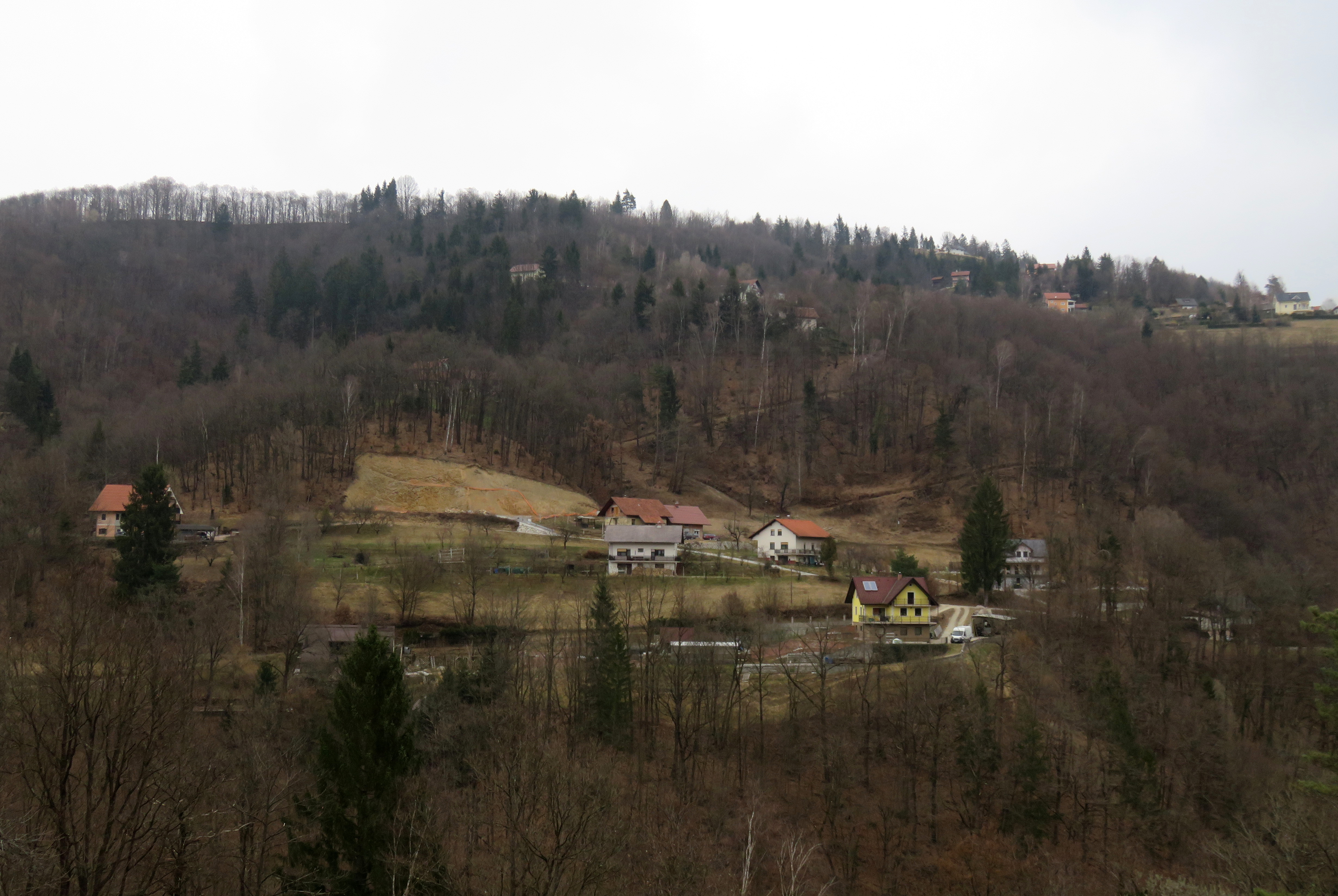

- Location in Slovenia
- Coordinates: 46°4′17.04″N 14°46′31.61″E
- Country: Slovenia
- Traditional region: Lower Carniola
- Statistical region: Central Sava
- Municipality: Litija

Area
  - Total: 5.83 km^{2} (2.25 sq mi)
- Elevation: 639.6 m (2,098 ft)

Population (2002)
  - Total: 181
- Postal code: 1281

Golišče (pronounced [ɡɔˈliːʃtʃɛ]; German: Golischberg) is a dispersed settlement in the hills south of Jevnica in the Municipality of Litija in central Slovenia. The area is part of the traditional region of Lower Carniola. It is now included with the rest of the municipality in the Central Sava Statistical Region; until January 2014 the municipality was part of the Central Slovenia Statistical Region.

== Name ==
Golišče was attested in historical sources as Guletsch in 1406, Guleͣtsch in 1407, and Golitsch in 1444. The name of the village is probably derived from the verb goliti in the sense of 'to clearcut', referring to a place that was clearcut. Other possibilities are derivation from gol 'young tree trunk' or 'bare, unforested area'.
