= Municipality of Litija =

Municipality of Slovenia

Municipality of Litija Občina Litija
- Municipality
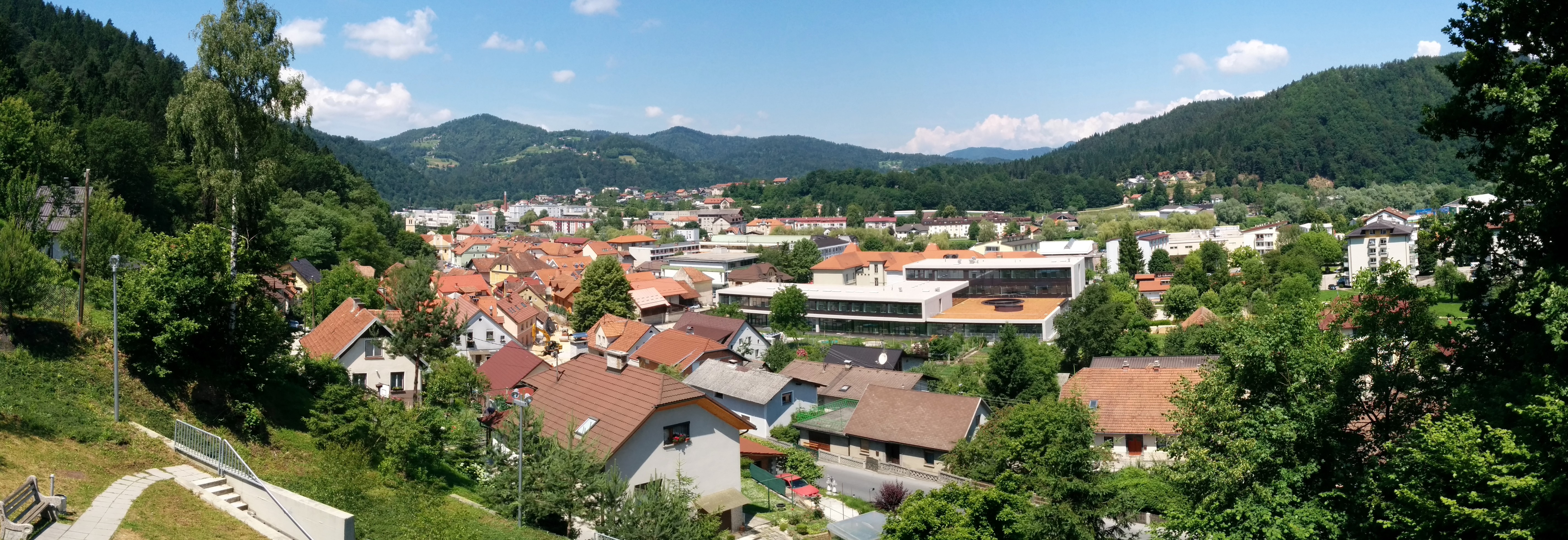

- Location of the Municipality of Litija in Slovenia
- Coordinates: 46°04′N 14°49′E
- Country: Slovenia

Government
  - Mayor: Franci Rokavec (Independent)

Area
  - Total: 221 km^{2} (85 sq mi)

Population (July 1, 2018)
  - Total: 15,342
  - Density: 69.4/km^{2} (180/sq mi)
- Time zone: UTC+01 (CET)
  - Summer (DST): UTC+02 (CEST)
- Website: www.litija.net

The Municipality of Litija (pronounced [liˈtiːja]; Slovene: Občina Litija) is a municipality in central Slovenia. The seat of the municipality is the town of Litija. The area is part of the traditional Upper and Lower Carniola regions. The entire municipality is now included in the Central Sava Statistical Region; until 2015 it was part of the Central Slovenia Statistical Region. The population of the municipality is just over 15,000.

== Coat of arms ==
The municipal coat of arms shows the situla vase from Klenik (the Vače situla), the Sava River, and a boatman pushing his boat, known as a punt, across the Sava.

== Settlements ==
In addition to the municipal seat of Litija, the municipality also includes the following settlements:

- Berinjek
- Bistrica
- Bitiče
- Boltija
- Borovak pri Polšniku
- Breg pri Litiji
- Brezje pri Kumpolju
- Brezovo
- Brglez
- Čateška Gora
- Čeplje
- Cirkuše
- Dobje
- Dobovica
- Dole pri Litiji
- Dolgo Brdo
- Gabrovka
- Gabrska Gora
- Gobnik
- Golišče
- Gorenje Jelenje
- Gornje Ravne
- Gradišče
- Hohovica
- Hude Ravne
- Javorje pri Gabrovki
- Jelenska Reber
- Jesenje
- Jevnica
- Ježevec
- Kal pri Dolah
- Kamni Vrh
- Kandrše
- Klanec pri Gabrovki
- Klenik
- Konj
- Konjšica
- Kresnice
- Kresniške Poljane
- Kresniški Vrh
- Kržišče pri Čatežu
- Kumpolje
- Laze pri Gobniku
- Laze pri Vačah
- Leše
- Ljubež v Lazih
- Lukovec
- Magolnik
- Mala Goba
- Mala Sela
- Mamolj
- Moravče pri Gabrovki
- Moravška Gora
- Nova Gora
- Okrog
- Pečice
- Podbukovje pri Vačah
- Podpeč pod Skalo
- Podšentjur
- Pogonik
- Polšnik
- Ponoviče
- Potok pri Vačah
- Prelesje
- Prevale
- Preveg
- Preženjske Njive
- Radgonica
- Ravne
- Renke
- Ribče
- Ržišče
- Sava
- Selce
- Širmanski Hrib
- Široka Set
- Slavina
- Slivna
- Sopota
- Spodnje Jelenje
- Spodnji Hotič
- Spodnji Log
- Stranski Vrh
- Strmec
- Suhadole
- Šumnik
- Tenetiše
- Tepe
- Tihaboj
- Tlaka
- Tolsti Vrh
- Vače
- Velika Goba
- Velika Preska
- Veliki Vrh pri Litiji
- Vernek
- Vodice pri Gabrovki
- Vovše
- Zagorica
- Zagozd
- Zapodje
- Zavrh
- Zglavnica
- Zgornja Jevnica
- Zgornji Hotič
- Zgornji Log
