= Renke =

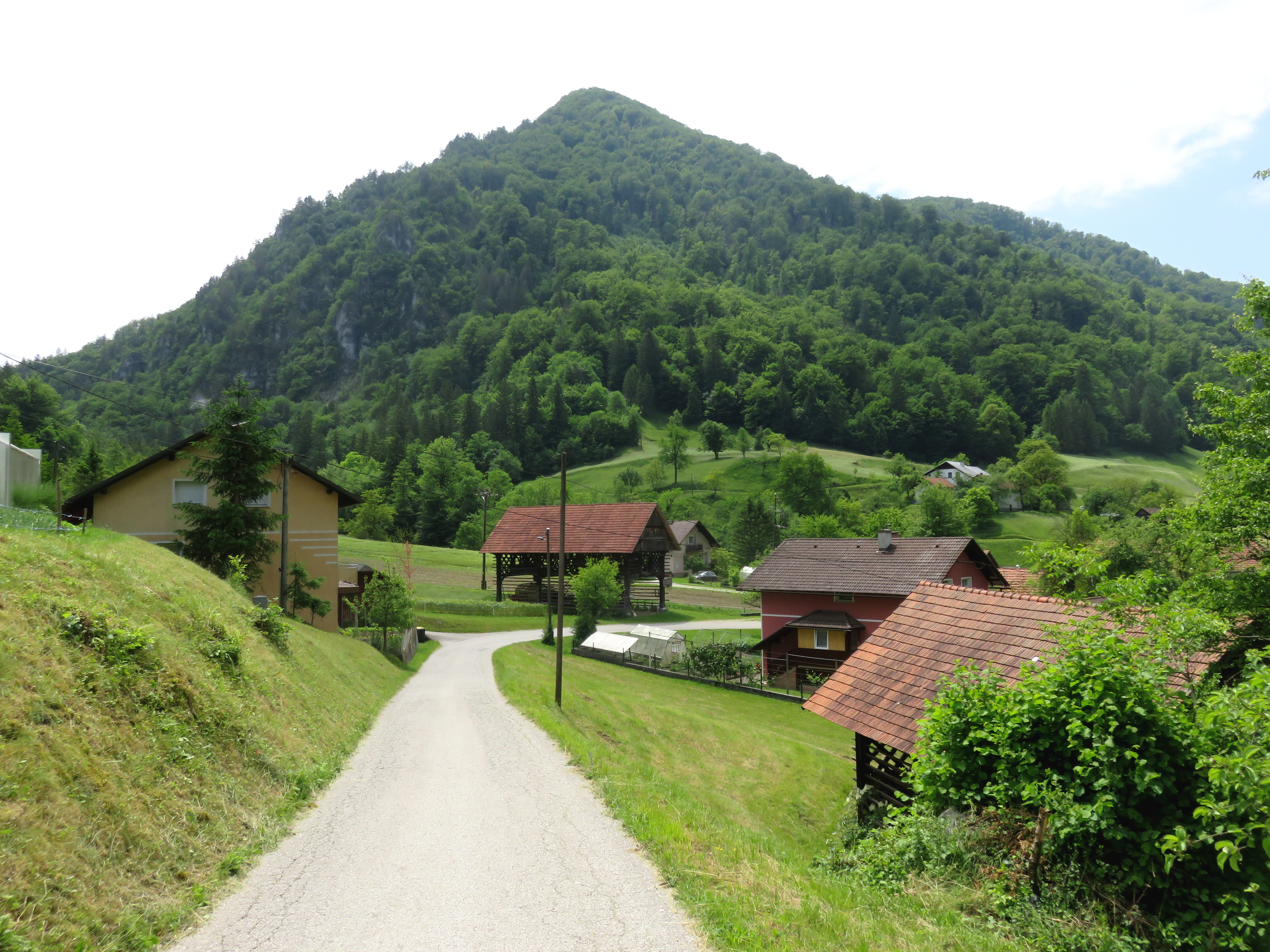

- Location in Slovenia
- Coordinates: 46°5′33.91″N 14°57′5.87″E
- Country: Slovenia
- Traditional region: Lower Carniola
- Statistical region: Central Sava
- Municipality: Litija

Area
  - Total: 1.14 km^{2} (0.44 sq mi)
- Elevation: 230.6 m (757 ft)

Population (2002)
  - Total: 49
- Postal code: 1282

Renke (pronounced [ˈɾeːnkɛ]) is a small village on the right bank of the Sava River in the Municipality of Litija in central Slovenia. The area is part of the traditional region of Lower Carniola. It is now included with the rest of the municipality in the Central Sava Statistical Region.

== Church ==
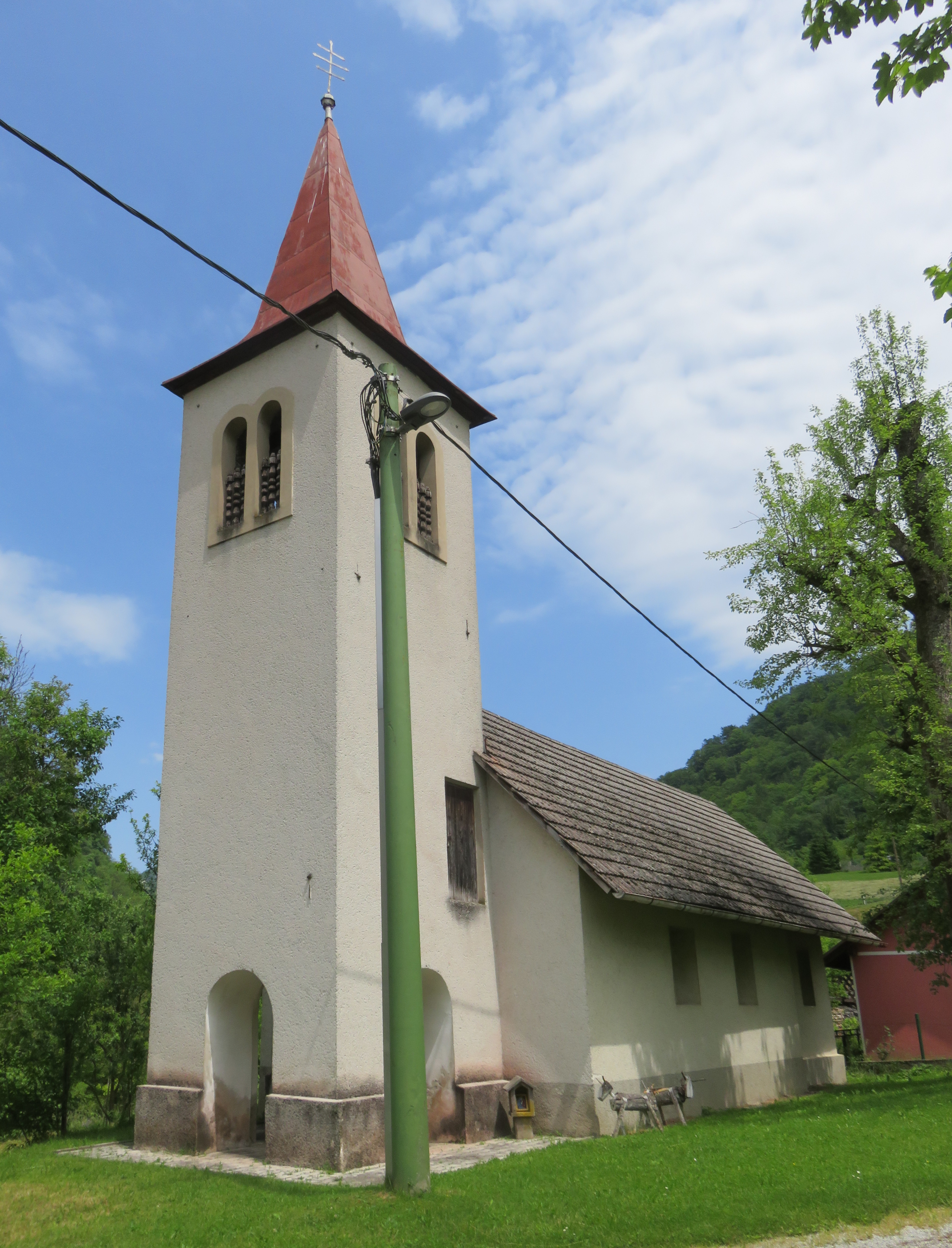
Saint Nicholas's Church

The local church is dedicated to Saint Nicholas and belongs to the Parish of Polšnik. It was a 16th-century church that was restyled in the Baroque in the late 17th century. The main altar dates to 1661.
