= Ljubež v Lazih =

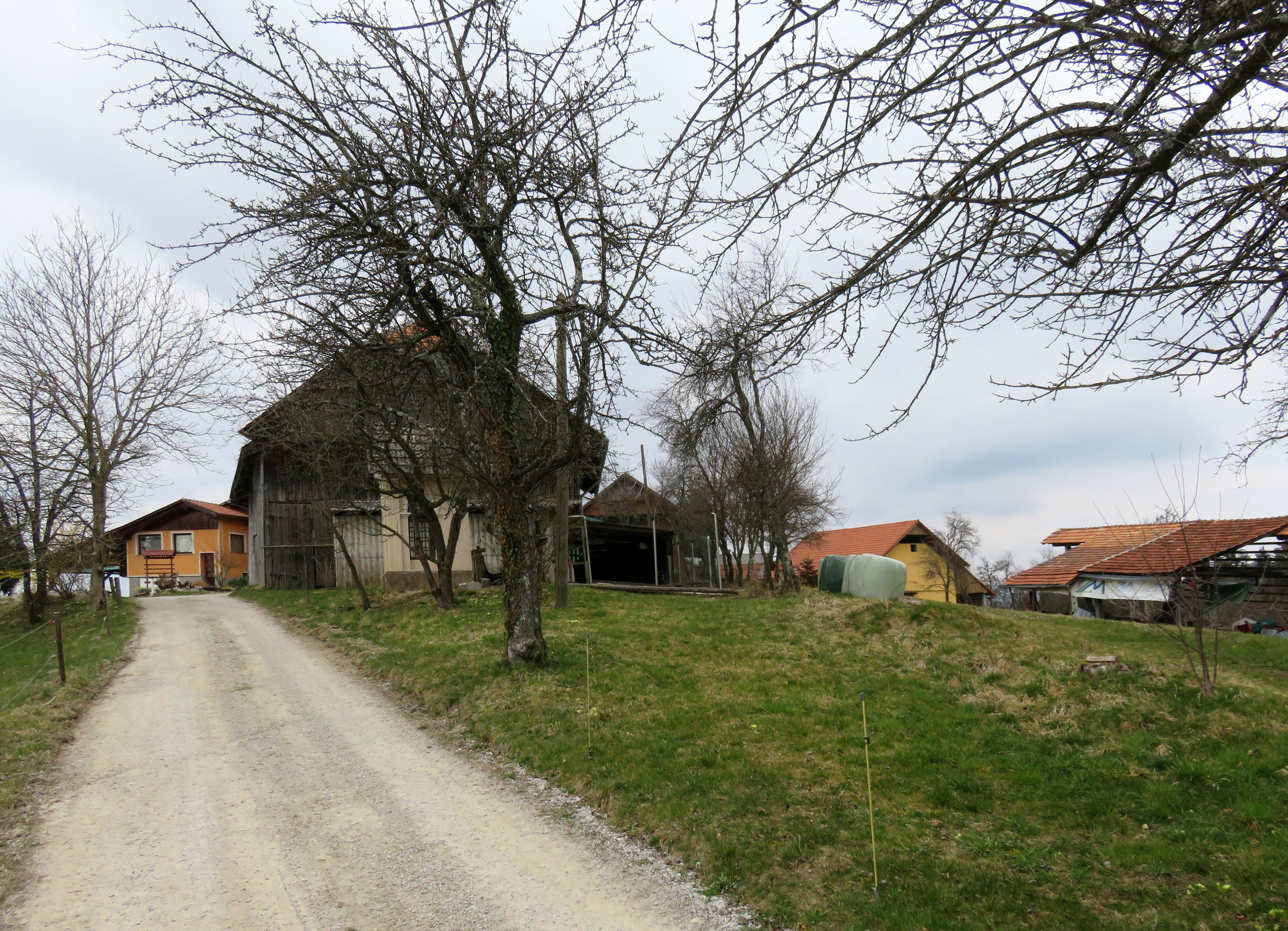

- Location in Slovenia
- Coordinates: 46°1′51.36″N 14°56′26.53″E
- Country: Slovenia
- Traditional region: Lower Carniola
- Statistical region: Central Sava
- Municipality: Litija

Area
  - Total: 2.38 km^{2} (0.92 sq mi)
- Elevation: 603.9 m (1,981 ft)

Population (2002)
  - Total: 6
- Postal code: 1273

Ljubež v Lazih (pronounced [ˈljuːbɛʃ w ˈlaːzix]; German: Lubesch) is a small settlement in the Municipality of Litija in central Slovenia. It lies just off the road from Litija to Gabrovka. The area is part of the traditional region of Lower Carniola. It is now included with the rest of the municipality in the Central Sava Statistical Region.
