= Kal pri Dolah =

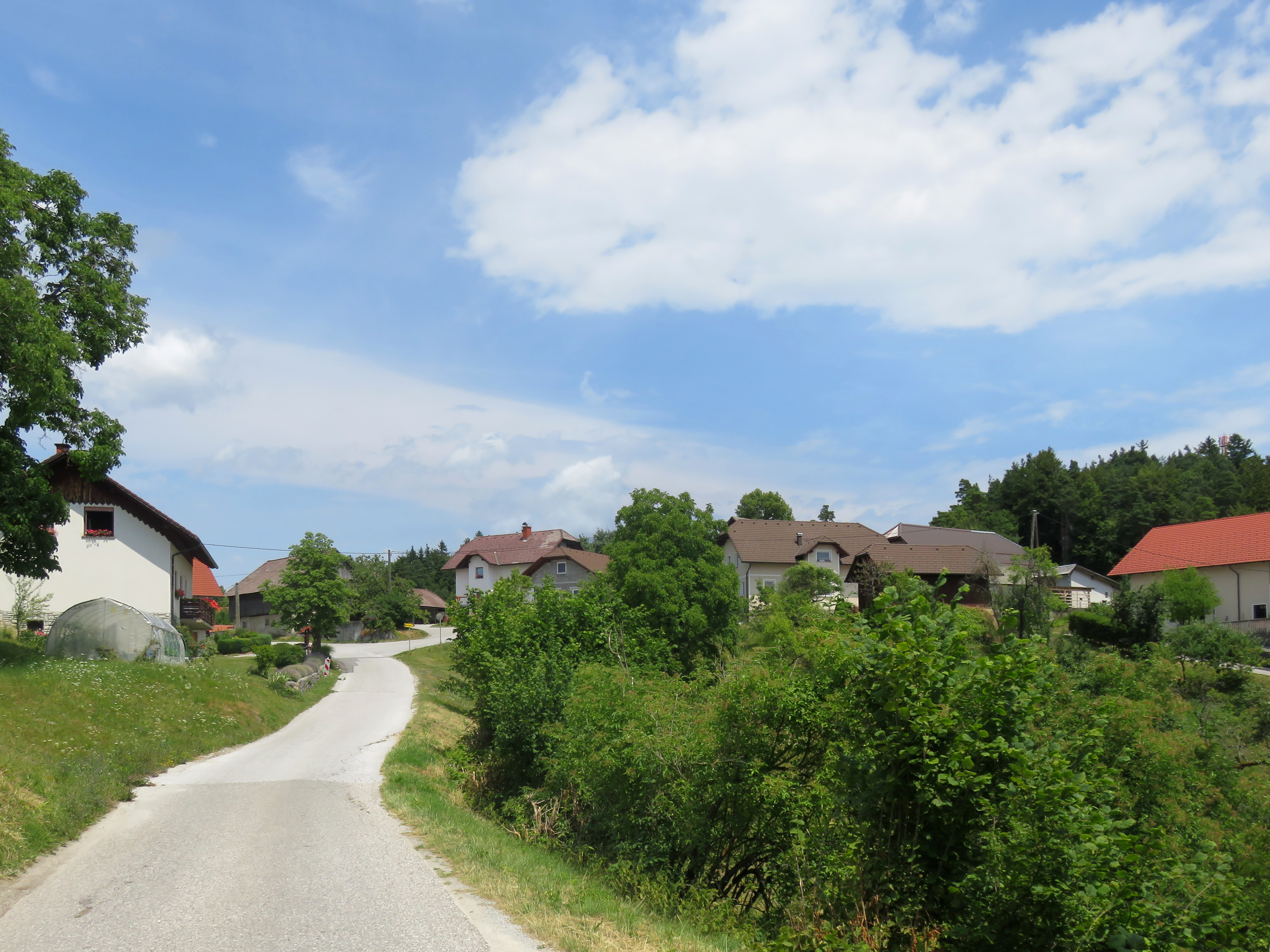

- Location in Slovenia
- Coordinates: 46°2′1.77″N 15°1′19.98″E
- Country: Slovenia
- Traditional region: Lower Carniola
- Statistical region: Central Sava
- Municipality: Litija

Area
  - Total: 0.39 km^{2} (0.15 sq mi)
- Elevation: 747.1 m (2,451 ft)

Population (2002)
  - Total: 48
- Postal code: 1273

Kal pri Dolah (pronounced [ˈkaːu̯ pɾi ˈdoːlax]) is a small settlement immediately north of Dole in the Municipality of Litija in central Slovenia. The area is part of the traditional region of Lower Carniola. It is now included with the rest of the municipality in the Central Sava Statistical Region; until January 2014, the municipality was part of the Central Slovenia Statistical Region.

== Name ==
The name of the settlement was changed from Kal to Kal pri Dolah in 1953.
