= Šumnik, Litija =

Šumnik
- Location in Slovenia
- Coordinates: 46°4′48.58″N 14°57′53.85″E
- Country: Slovenia
- Traditional region: Lower Carniola
- Statistical region: Central Sava
- Municipality: Litija

Area
  - Total: 0.66 km^{2} (0.25 sq mi)
- Elevation: 542.7 m (1,781 ft)

Population (2002)
  - Total: 21
- Postal code: 1272

Šumnik (pronounced [ʃuˈmniːk]; in older sources also Šemnik, German: Schemnik) is a small settlement in the valley of a stream with the same name, a minor right tributary of the Sava River, in the Municipality of Litija in central Slovenia. The area is part of the traditional region of Lower Carniola and is now included with the rest of the municipality in the Central Sava Statistical Region.
