= Zglavnica =

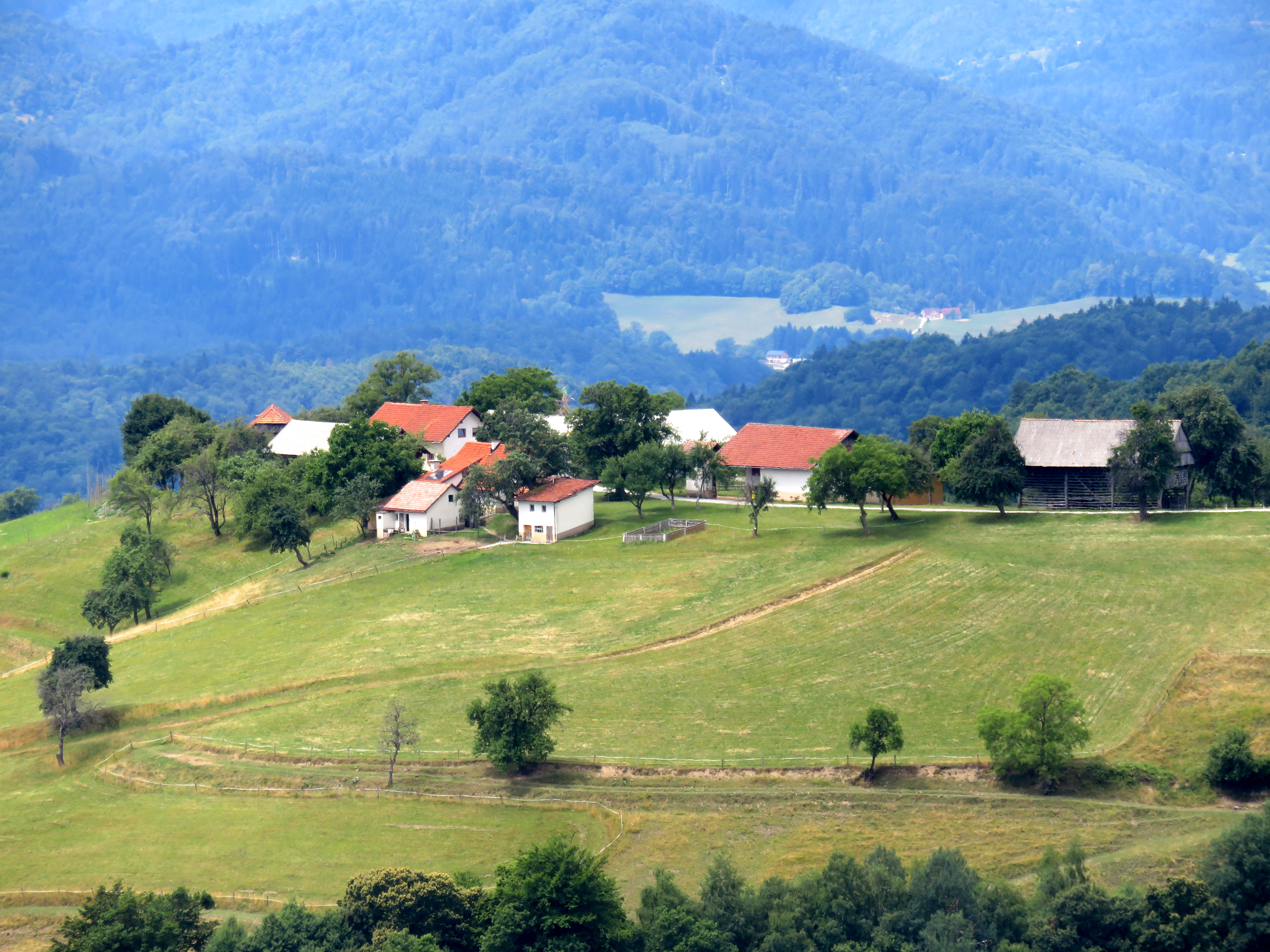

- Location in Slovenia
- Coordinates: 46°2′42.55″N 14°56′51.59″E
- Country: Slovenia
- Traditional region: Lower Carniola
- Statistical region: Central Sava
- Municipality: Litija

Area
  - Total: 2.79 km^{2} (1.08 sq mi)
- Elevation: 703.8 m (2,309 ft)

Population (2002)
  - Total: 20
- Postal code: 1272

Zglavnica (pronounced [ˈzɡlaːu̯nitsa]) is a settlement in the hills east of Šmartno pri Litiji in central Slovenia. It belongs to the Municipality of Litija. The area is part of the traditional region of Lower Carniola and is now included with the rest of the municipality in the Central Sava Statistical Region.
