= Moravče pri Gabrovki =

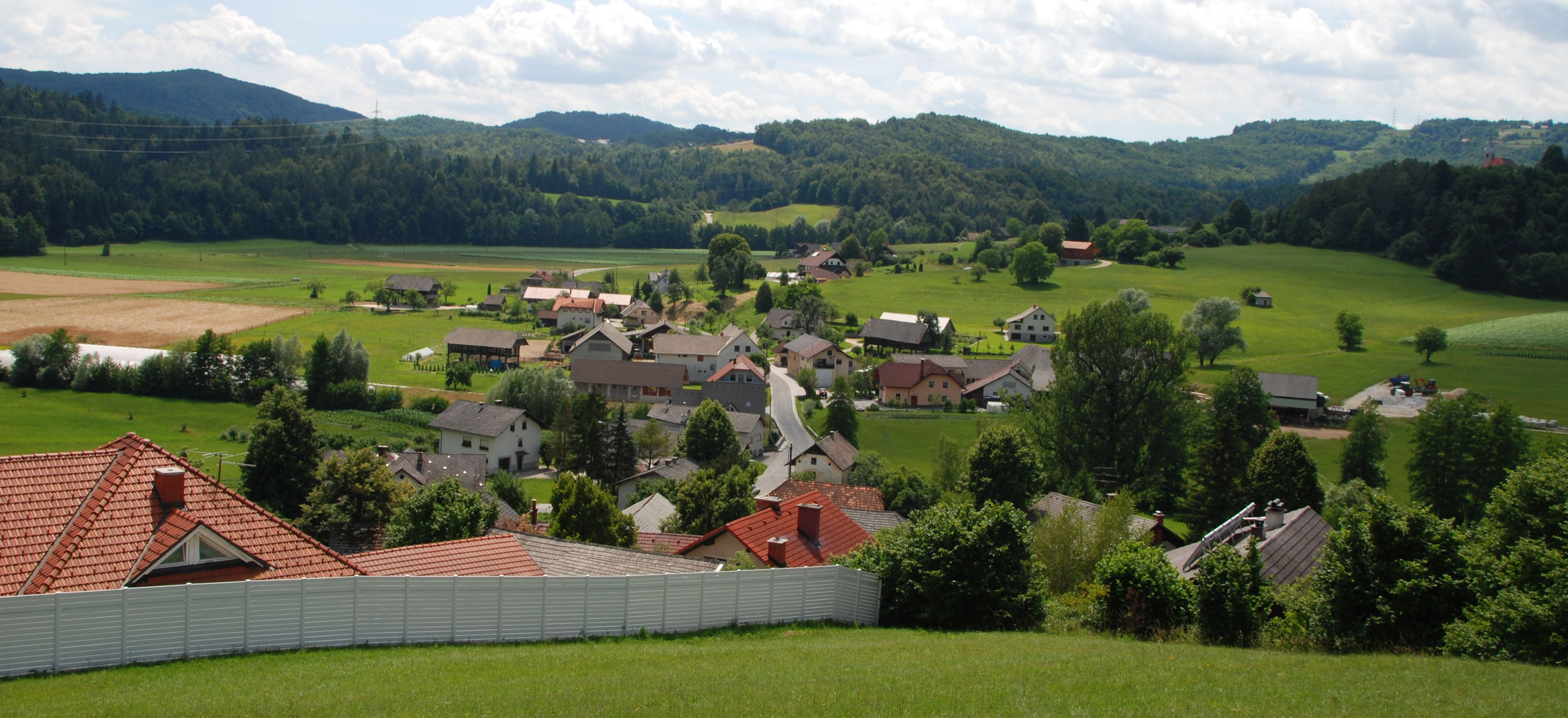

- Location in Slovenia
- Coordinates: 46°0′14.86″N 14°57′31.7″E
- Country: Slovenia
- Traditional region: Lower Carniola
- Statistical region: Central Sava
- Municipality: Litija

Area
  - Total: 2.81 km^{2} (1.08 sq mi)
- Elevation: 473.2 m (1,552 ft)

Population (2012)
  - Total: 220
  - Density: 78/km^{2} (200/sq mi)
- Postal code: 1274

Moravče pri Gabrovki (pronounced [mɔˈɾaːu̯tʃɛ pɾi ˈɡaːbɾɔu̯ki]; German: Moräutsch) is a settlement in the Municipality of Litija in central Slovenia. The area is part of the traditional region of Lower Carniola. It is now included with the rest of the municipality in the Central Sava Statistical Region.

== Name ==
The name of the settlement was changed from Moravče to Moravče pri Gabrovki in 1953. In the past the German name was Moräutsch.

== Church ==
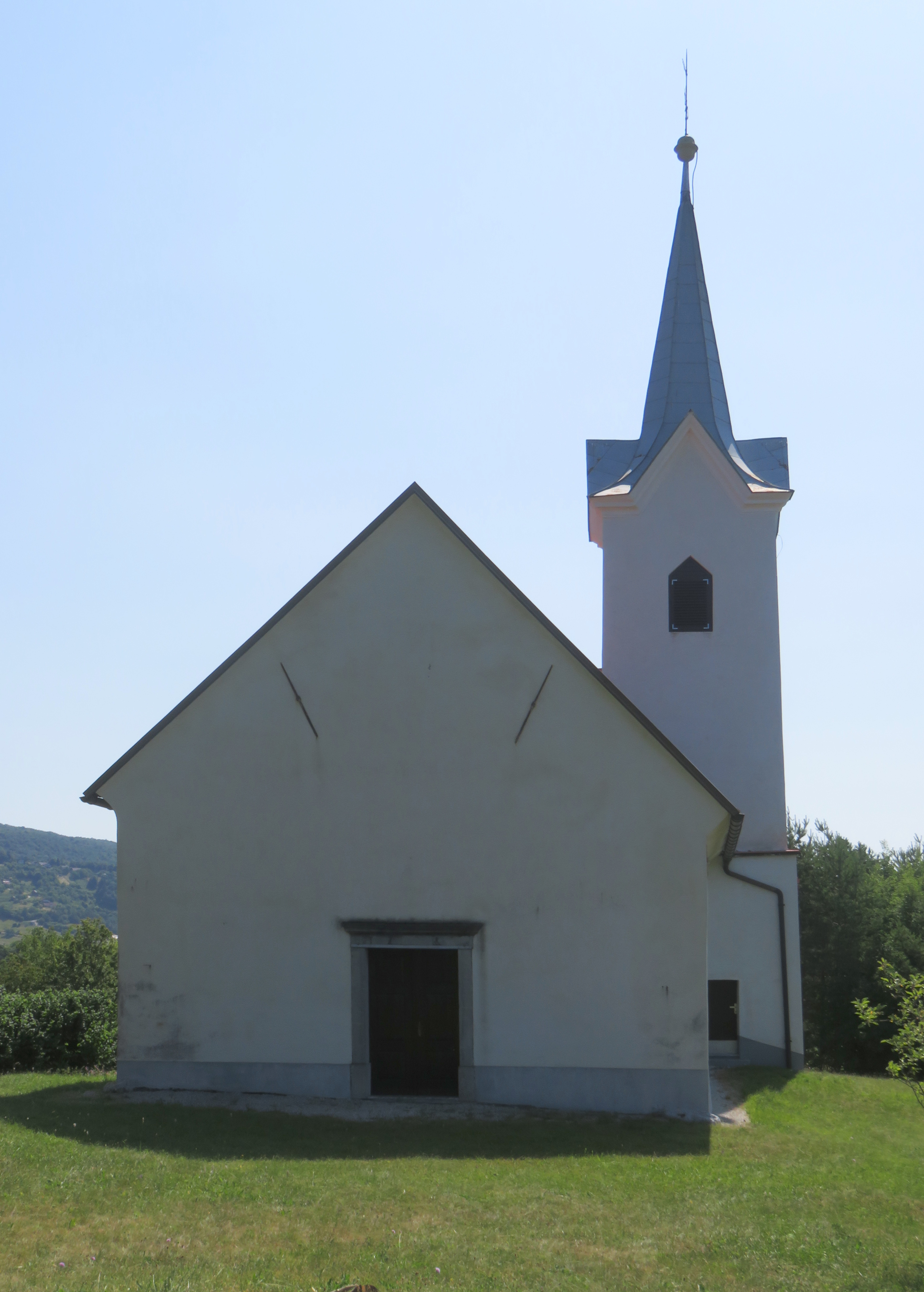
Saint Hermagoras's Church

The local church is dedicated to Saint Hermagoras (Slovene: sveti Mohor) and belongs to the Parish of Gabrovka. It is a 16th-century building, first mentioned in written documents dating to 1526. Its main altar dates to 1674.
