= Zgornji Log =

Zgornji Log Gorenji Log (until 1995)
- Location in Slovenia
- Coordinates: 46°4′38.09″N 14°49′31.65″E
- Country: Slovenia
- Traditional region: Upper Carniola
- Statistical region: Central Sava
- Municipality: Litija

Area
  - Total: 1.97 km^{2} (0.76 sq mi)
- Elevation: 245.8 m (806 ft)

Population (2002)
  - Total: 135
- Postal code: 1270

Zgornji Log (pronounced [ˈzɡoːɾnji ˈloːk]; in older sources also Gorenji Log, German: Oberlog) is a settlement on the left bank of the Sava River in the Municipality of Litija in central Slovenia. The railway line from Ljubljana to Zidani Most runs through the settlement and crosses the Sava just north of the settlement core. The area is part of the traditional region of Upper Carniola and is now included with the rest of the municipality in the Central Sava Statistical Region.

== Name ==
The settlement was originally named Gorenji Log; it was renamed Zgornji Log in 1995.

== Cultural heritage ==
A late Bronze Age hoard was found in the settlement in the mid-19th century. It contained four bronze axes, a sickle, and a spear.
