= Zapodje =

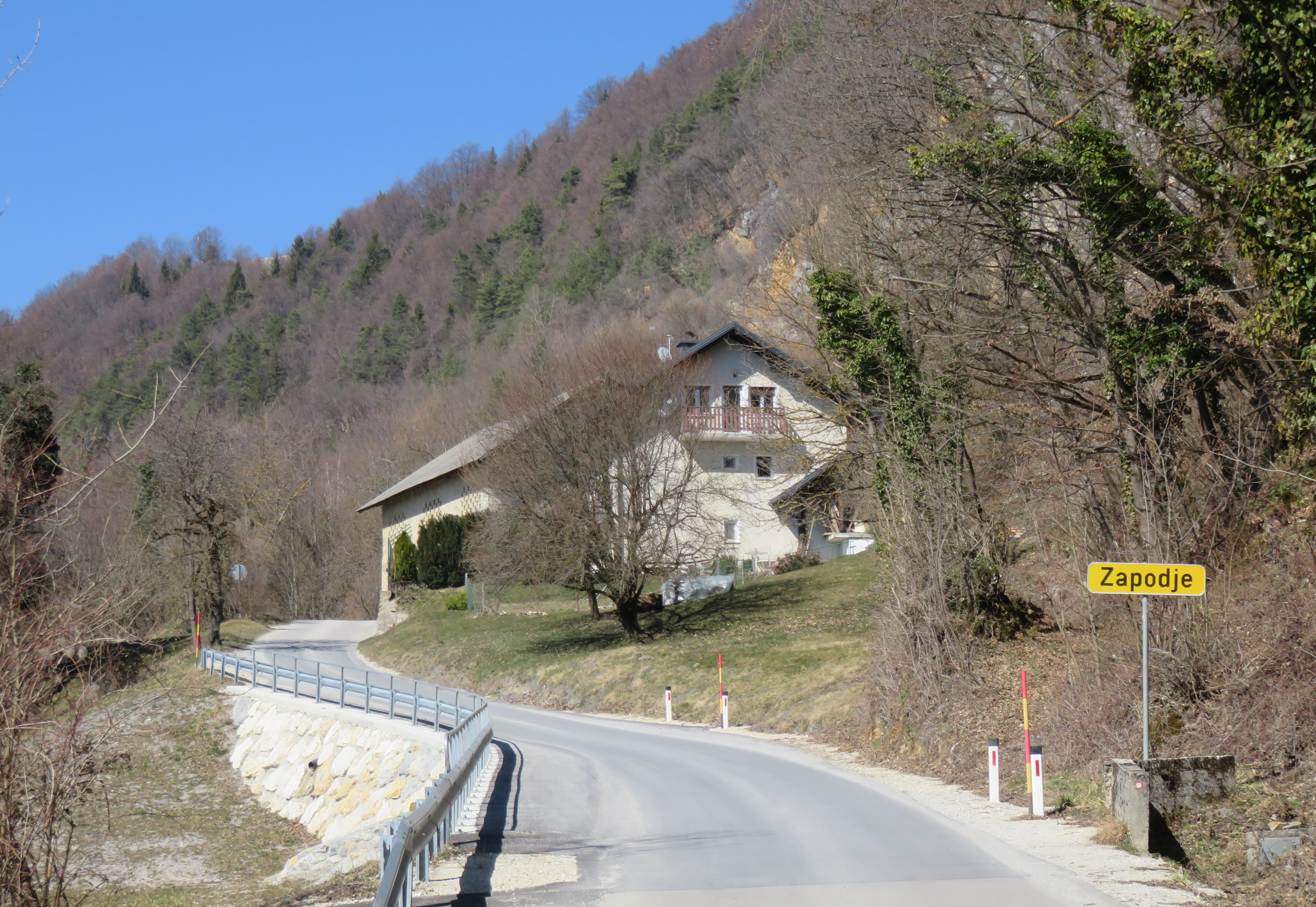

- Location in Slovenia
- Coordinates: 46°6′40.7″N 14°48′1.85″E
- Country: Slovenia
- Traditional region: Upper Carniola
- Statistical region: Central Sava
- Municipality: Litija

Area
  - Total: 0.53 km^{2} (0.20 sq mi)
- Elevation: 529.6 m (1,738 ft)

Population (2002)
  - Total: 8
- Postal code: 1281

Zapodje (pronounced [zaˈpoːdjɛ]) is a small settlement in the hills above Zgornji Hotič in the Municipality of Litija in central Slovenia. The area is part of the traditional region of Upper Carniola and is now included with the rest of the municipality in the Central Sava Statistical Region.
