= Brezje pri Kumpolju =

- Location in Slovenia
- Coordinates: 45°58′47.43″N 14°59′40.46″E
- Country: Slovenia
- Traditional region: Lower Carniola
- Statistical region: Central Sava
- Municipality: Litija

Area
  - Total: 1.04 km^{2} (0.40 sq mi)
- Elevation: 384.4 m (1,261 ft)

Population (2002)
  - Total: 10
- Postal code: 1274

Brezje pri Kumpolju (pronounced [ˈbɾeːzjɛ pɾi ˈkuːmpɔlju]) is a small, remote settlement in the Municipality of Litija in central Slovenia. The area is part of the traditional region of Lower Carniola. The entire municipality is now included in the Central Sava Statistical Region; until January 2014, it was part of the Central Slovenia Statistical Region.

== Name ==
Brezje pri Kumpolju was attested in written sources as Pierkg in 1436 and Pirgkhach in 1498, among other spellings. The name of the settlement was changed from Brezje to Brezje pri Kumpolju in 1953.
