= Preveg =

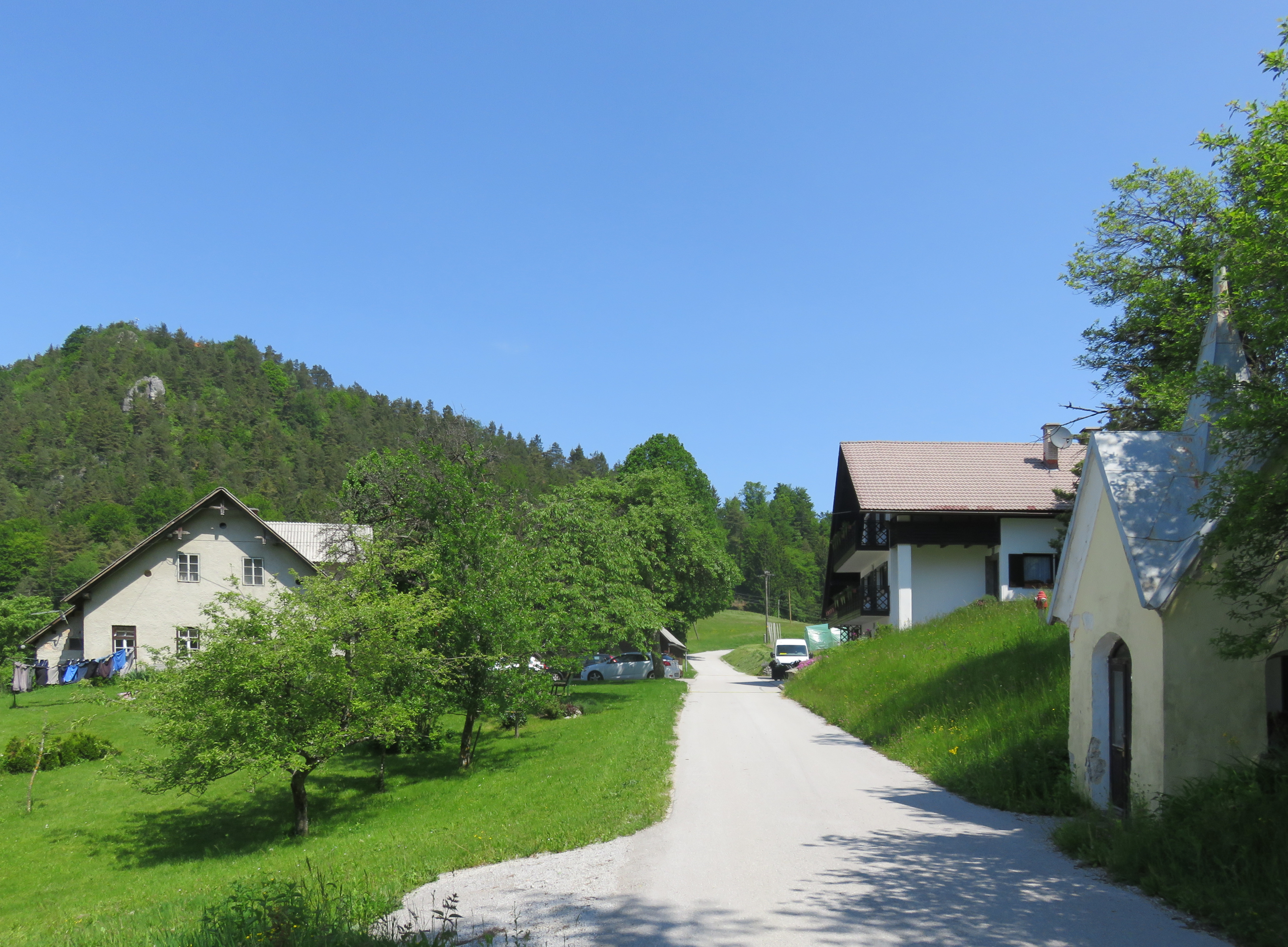

- Location in Slovenia
- Coordinates: 46°4′37.84″N 14°58′59.95″E
- Country: Slovenia
- Traditional region: Lower Carniola
- Statistical region: Central Sava
- Municipality: Litija

Area
  - Total: 1.83 km^{2} (0.71 sq mi)
- Elevation: 739.9 m (2,427 ft)

Population (2002)
  - Total: 25
- Postal code: 1272

Preveg (pronounced [ˈpɾeːʋɛk] or [pɾɛˈʋeːk]; in older sources also Prevek, German: Prewek) is a small settlement in the hills above the right bank of the Sava River in the Municipality of Litija in central Slovenia. The area is part of the traditional region of Lower Carniola. It is now included with the rest of the municipality in the Central Sava Statistical Region.
