= Kresniški Vrh =

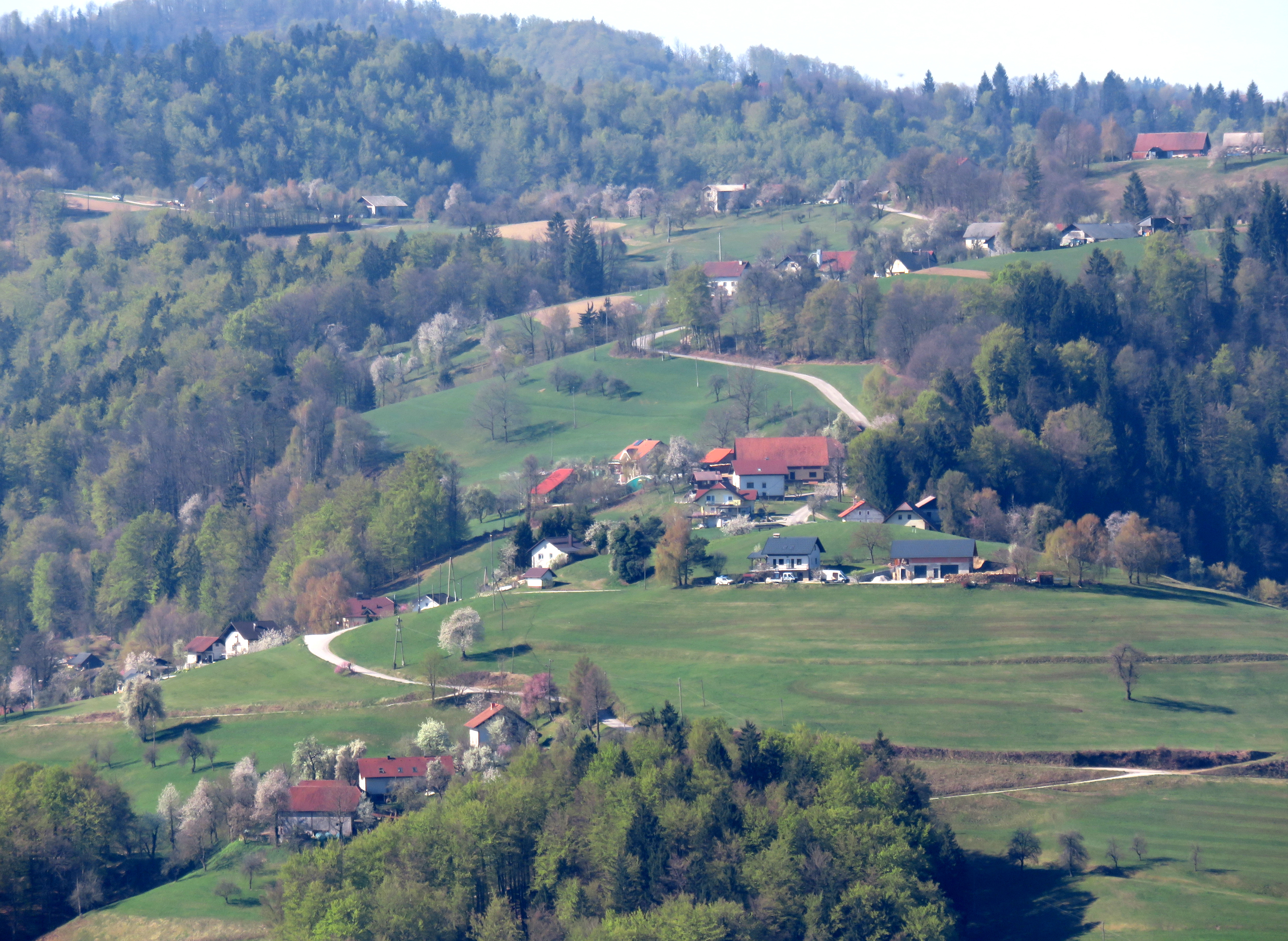

- Location in Slovenia
- Coordinates: 46°5′0.81″N 14°46′51.45″E
- Country: Slovenia
- Traditional region: Lower Carniola
- Statistical region: Central Sava
- Municipality: Litija

Area
  - Total: 4.7 km^{2} (1.8 sq mi)
- Elevation: 574.1 m (1,884 ft)

Population (2002)
  - Total: 190
- Postal code: 1281

Kresniški Vrh (pronounced [kɾɛˈsniːʃki ˈʋəɾx]; German: Kreßnitzberg) is a settlement in the hills south of Kresnice in the Municipality of Litija in central Slovenia. The area is part of the traditional region of Lower Carniola. It is now included with the rest of the municipality in the Central Sava Statistical Region.
