= Ponoviče =

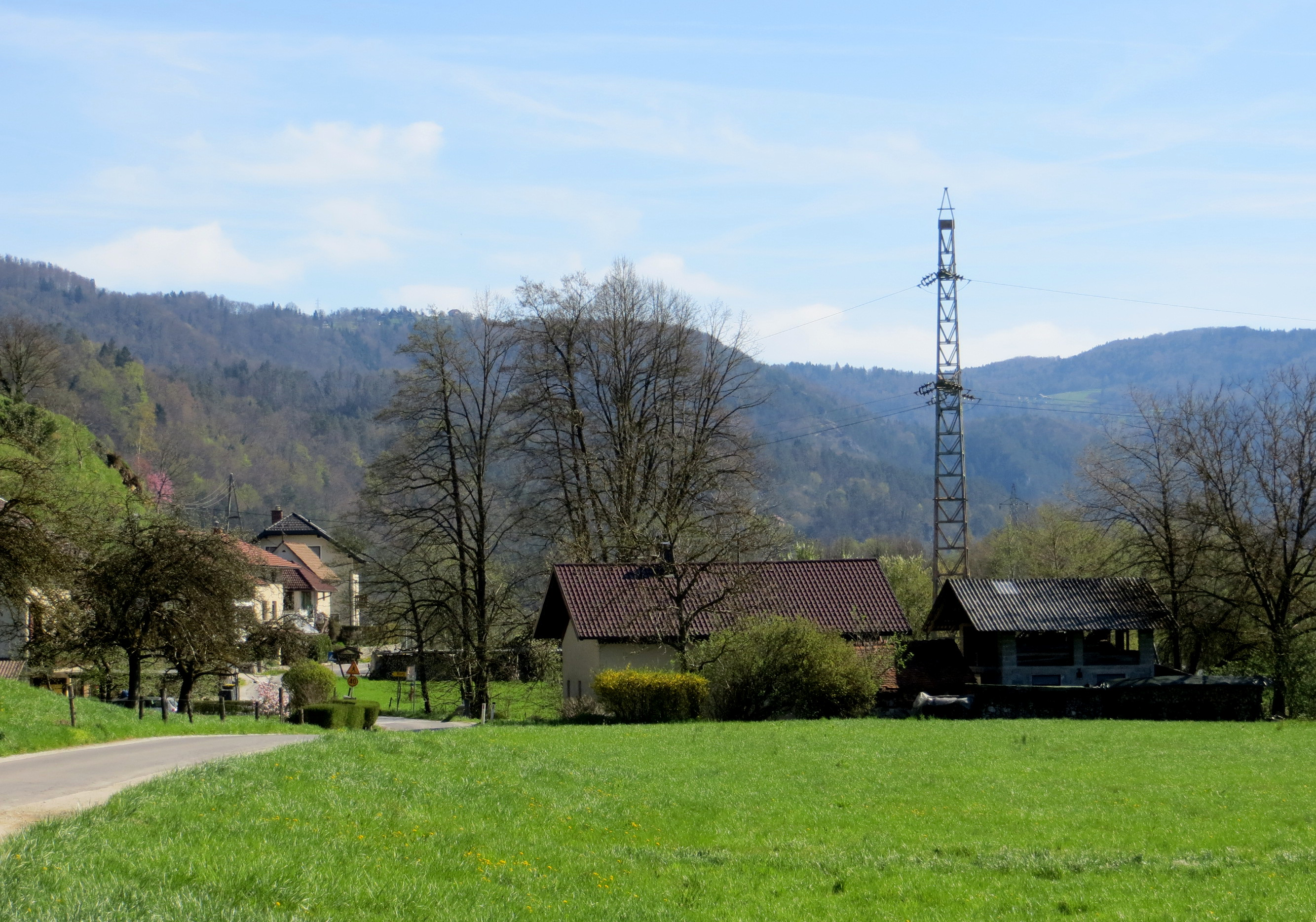

- Location in Slovenia
- Coordinates: 46°4′41.19″N 14°51′55″E
- Country: Slovenia
- Traditional region: Upper Carniola
- Statistical region: Central Sava
- Municipality: Litija

Area
  - Total: 5.07 km^{2} (1.96 sq mi)
- Elevation: 235.2 m (772 ft)

Population (2002)
  - Total: 174
- Postal code: 1282

Ponoviče (pronounced [pɔnɔˈʋiːtʃɛ]; German: Ponowitsch) is a settlement along the left bank of the Sava River in the Municipality of Litija in central Slovenia. The railway line from Ljubljana to Zidani Most runs through the settlement. The area is part of the traditional region of Upper Carniola. It is now included with the rest of the municipality in the Central Sava Statistical Region. The settlement includes the hamlets of Mačkovina and Smrekarica.

== Name ==
Ponoviče was attested in historical documents as Penobitsch in 1483 and Panabitsch in 1486.

== Castles ==
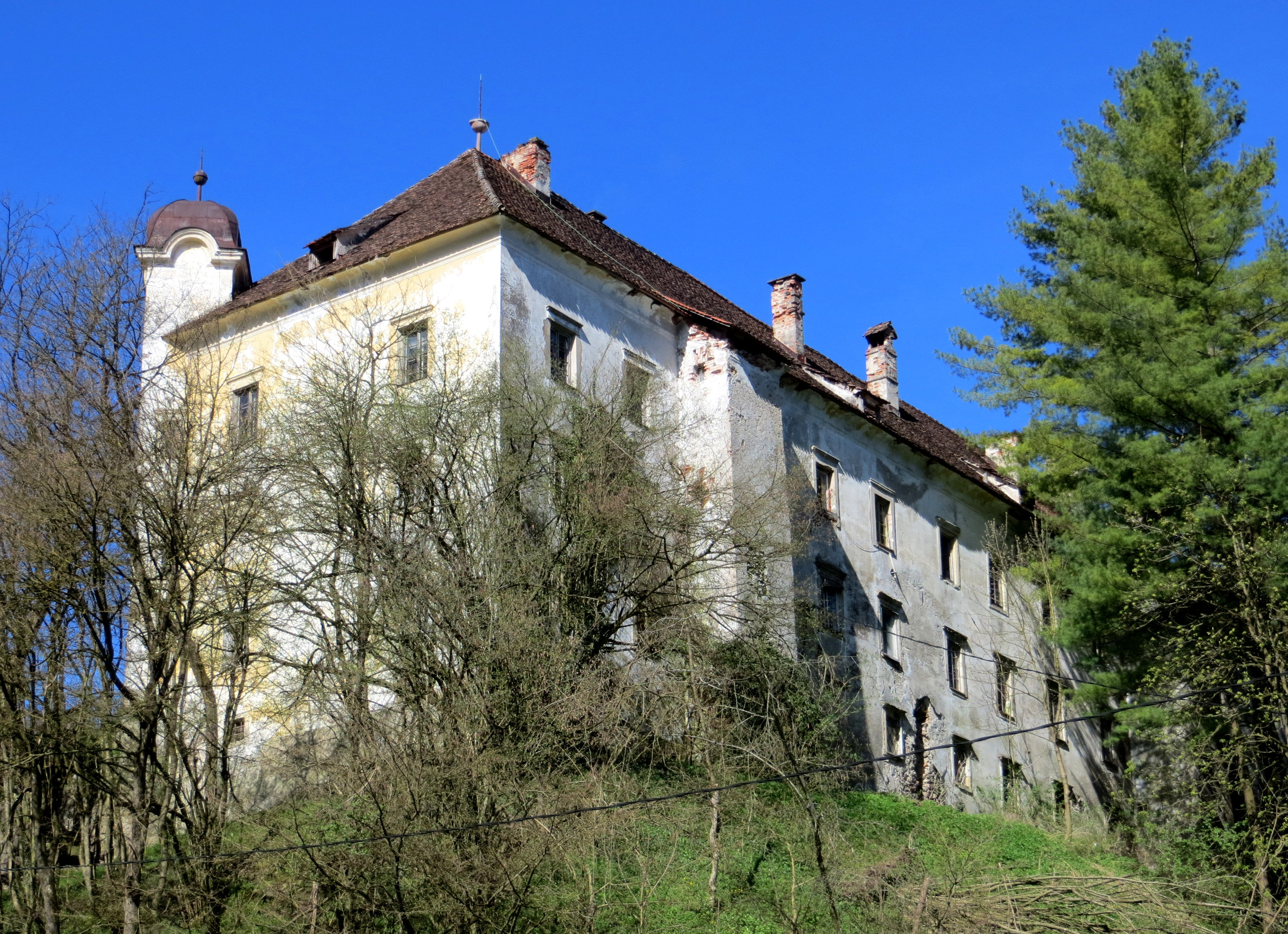
Ponoviče Castle

Knežija Castle (German: Graf(f)enweg) formerly stood on the hill above Mačkovina. It was first mentioned in written sources in 1469.

A large 16th-century mansion with surrounding grounds, known as Ponoviče Castle (Slovene: Grad Ponoviče), stands on a small elevation above the banks of the Sava east of the settlement.
