= Hohovica =

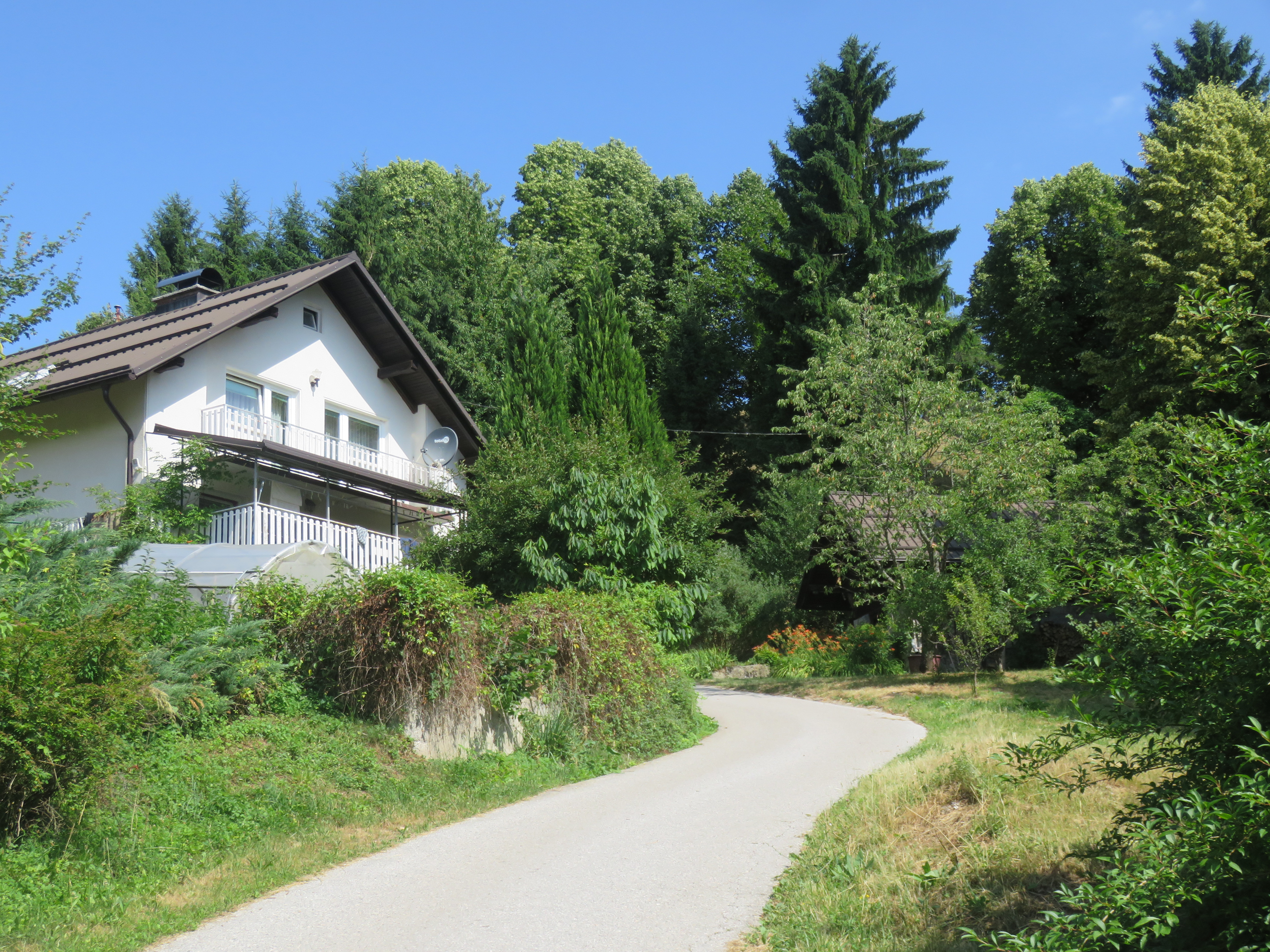

- Location in Slovenia
- Coordinates: 46°0′34.3″N 14°57′39.59″E
- Country: Slovenia
- Traditional region: Lower Carniola
- Statistical region: Central Sava
- Municipality: Litija

Area
  - Total: 0.58 km^{2} (0.22 sq mi)
- Elevation: 423.9 m (1,391 ft)

Population (2002)
  - Total: 24
- Postal code: 1274

Hohovica (pronounced [ˈxoːxɔʋitsa]) is a small settlement northwest of Gabrovka in the Municipality of Litija in central Slovenia. The area is part of the traditional region of Lower Carniola. It is now included with the rest of the municipality in the Central Sava Statistical Region; until January 2014 the municipality was part of the Central Slovenia Statistical Region.

== Name ==
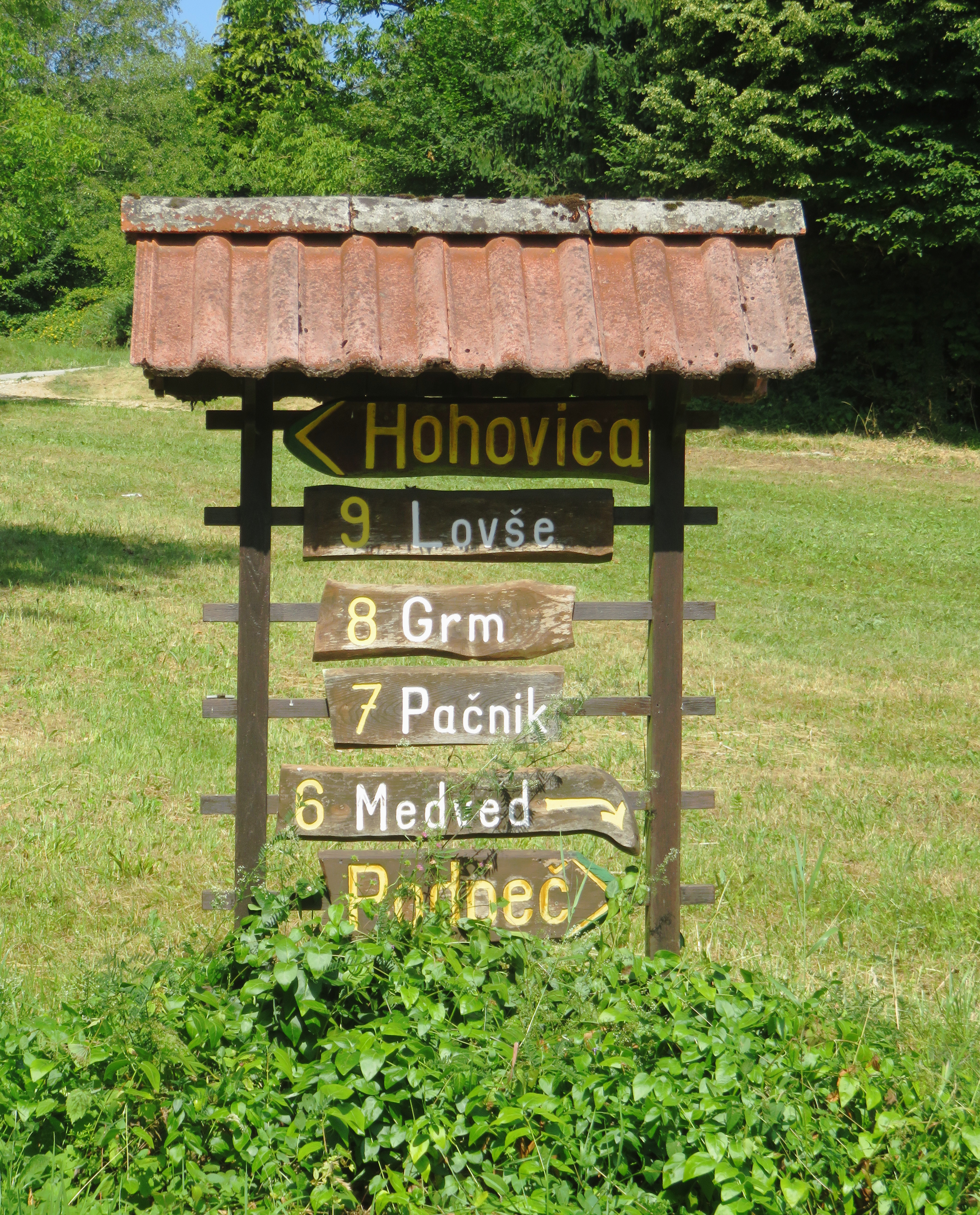
Sign for Hohovica

Locally, the name Hohovica has been reduced via haplology to Hovca. This in turn is the basis of the adjective hovški -a -o, as in the microtoponym Hovška hosta 'the Hohovica Woods'.

== Cultural heritage ==
Archaeological finds in the area, dating to the Iron Age, point to the possible site of a hill fort on Gradišče Hill in the southeastern part of the settlement.
