= Bistrica, Šentrupert =

Bistrica
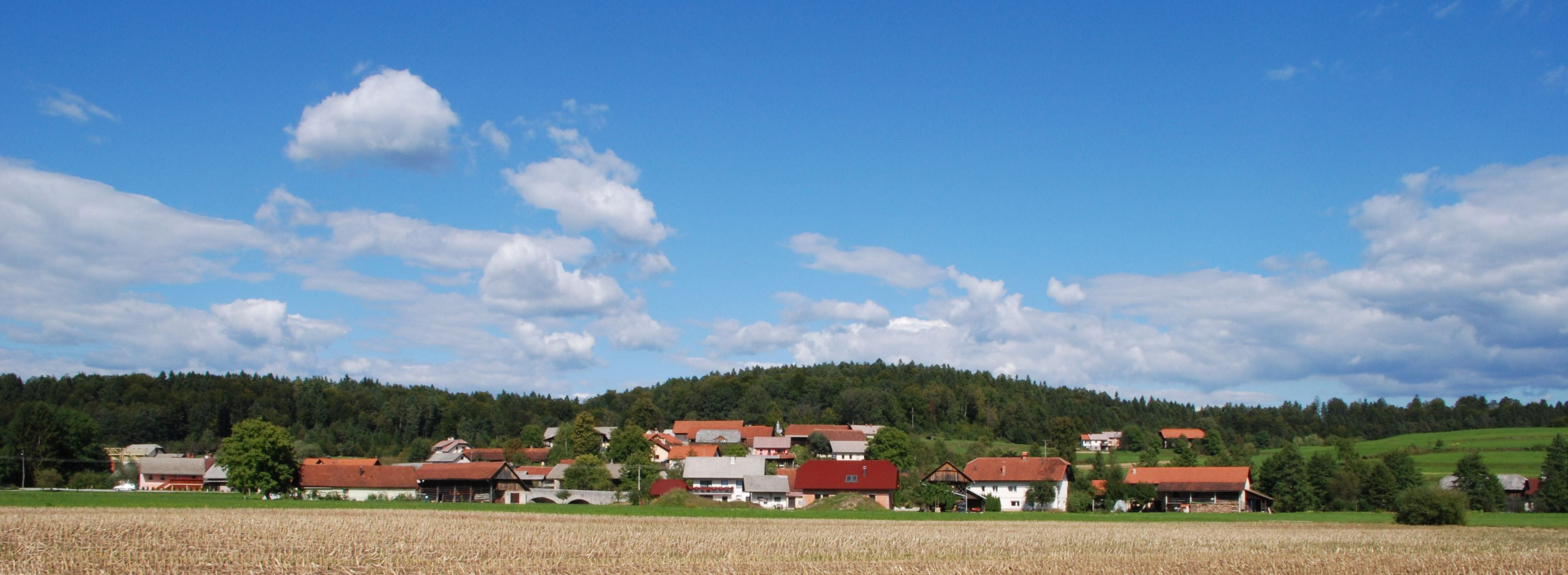
- View of Bistrica from the rail line from Sevnica to Trebnje south of the village

- Location in Slovenia
- Coordinates: 45°57′39.2″N 15°6′41.27″E
- Country: Slovenia
- Traditional region: Lower Carniola
- Statistical region: Southeast Slovenia
- Municipality: Šentrupert

Area
  - Total: 1.9 km^{2} (0.73 sq mi)
- Elevation: 121 m (397 ft)

Population (2012)
  - Total: 117
  - Density: 61/km^{2} (160/sq mi)

Bistrica (pronounced [ˈbiːstɾitsa]; German: Feistritz) is a settlement in the Municipality of Šentrupert in southeastern Slovenia. The municipality is now included in the Southeast Slovenia Statistical Region. The settlement lies on the regional road leading southeast from Mirna to Mokronog in the historical region of Lower Carniola. The rail line from Sevnica to Trebnje runs south of the settlement.

== Name ==
Bistrica was attested in written sources as Fewstritz in 1404, among other spellings.

== Landmarks ==
At the southeastern edge of the village stands Simončič Hayrack, the only hayrack in Slovenia with the status of a cultural monument of national significance. It is used as a venue for art exhibitions and other cultural events as well as to dry hay and store agricultural machinery. Another significant object in the village is a three-arch stone road bridge over the Bistrica River, built in the first half of the 19th century.
