= Podpeč pod Skalo =

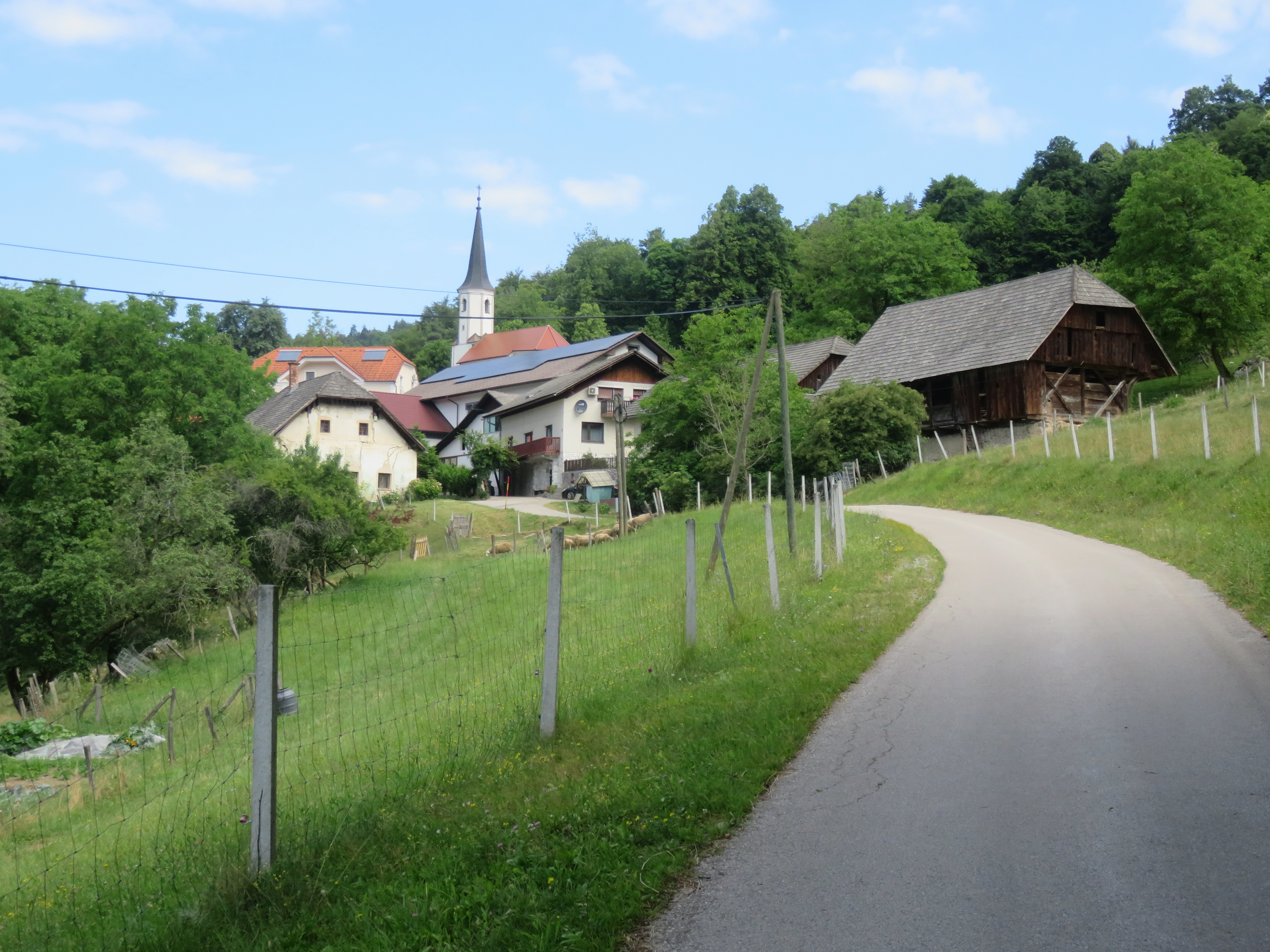

- Location in Slovenia
- Coordinates: 46°1′17.39″N 14°57′51.19″E
- Country: Slovenia
- Traditional region: Lower Carniola
- Statistical region: Central Sava
- Municipality: Litija

Area
  - Total: 0.75 km^{2} (0.29 sq mi)
- Elevation: 492.2 m (1,615 ft)

Population (2002)
  - Total: 15
- Postal code: 1274

Podpeč pod Skalo (pronounced [pɔtˈpeːtʃ pɔt ˈskaːlɔ]) is a small settlement northwest of Gabrovka in the Municipality of Litija in central Slovenia. The area is part of the traditional region of Lower Carniola. It is now included with the rest of the municipality in the Central Sava Statistical Region.

== Name ==
The name of the settlement was changed from Podpeč to Podpeč pod Skalo in 1953.

== Church ==
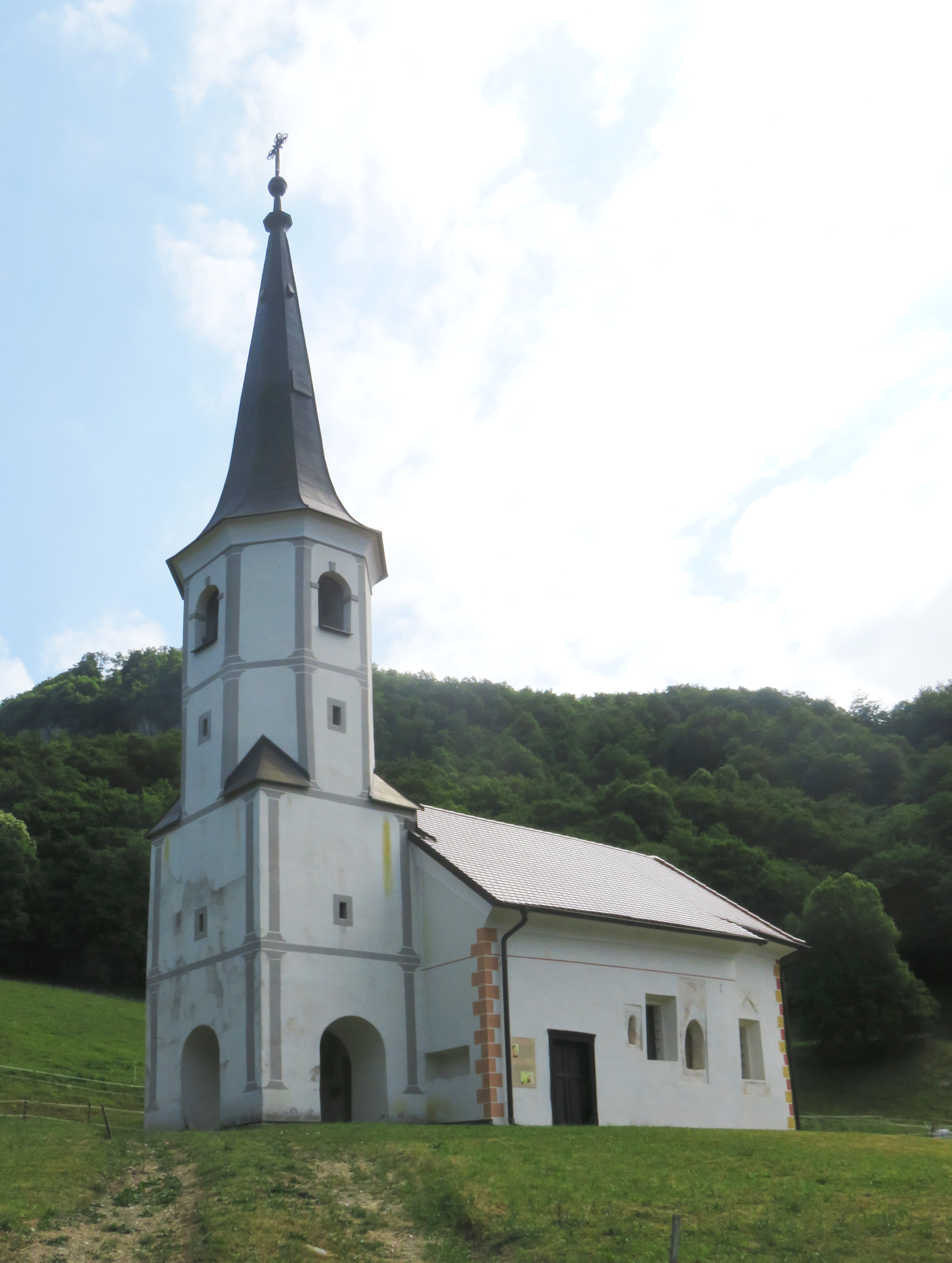
Saint Paul's Church

The local church is dedicated to Saint Paul and belongs to the Parish of Gabrovka. It was built in the late 14th century as the chapel of the now ruined Gallenstein Castle. The castle was destroyed during Ottoman raids in the 16th century. The interior of the church was painted three times: around 1420, in the late 15th century, and again in 1539.
