= Kumpolje =

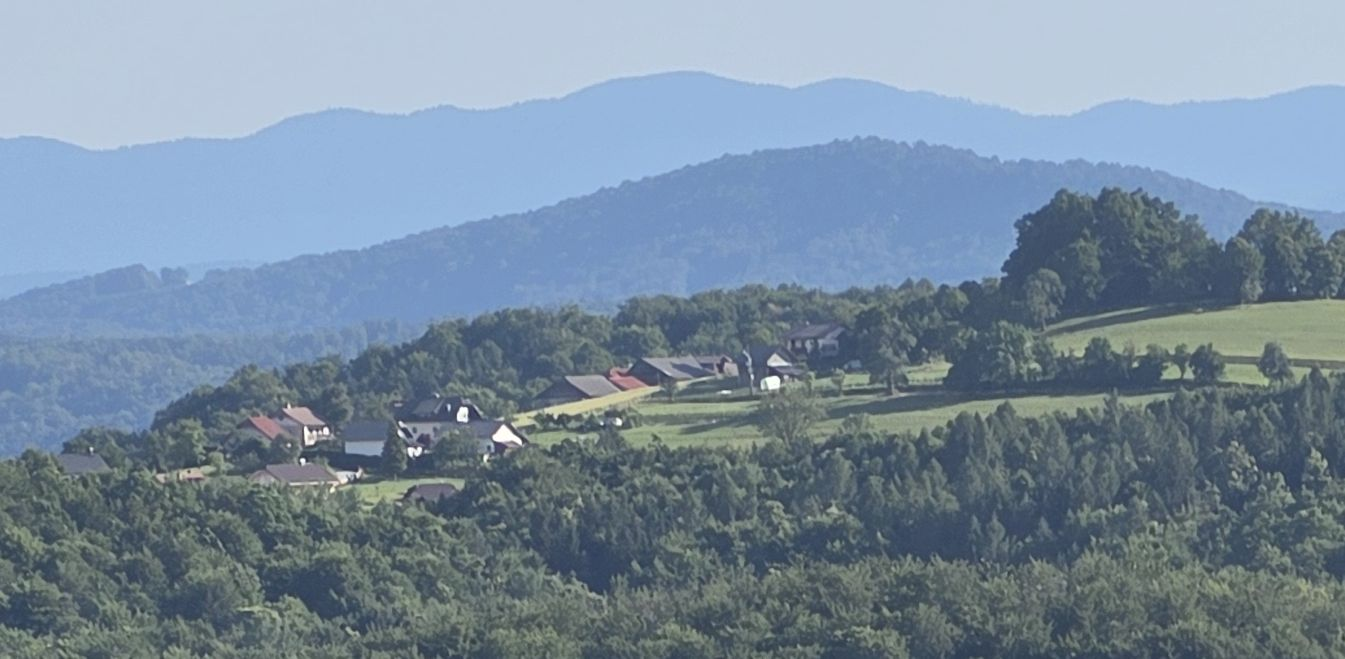

- Location in Slovenia
- Coordinates: 45°58′40.95″N 15°0′19.96″E
- Country: Slovenia
- Traditional region: Lower Carniola
- Statistical region: Central Sava
- Municipality: Litija

Area
  - Total: 1.36 km^{2} (0.53 sq mi)
- Elevation: 385 m (1,263 ft)

Population (2022)
  - Total: 12
- Postal code: 1274

Kumpolje (pronounced [ˈkuːmpɔljɛ]) is a small settlement south of Gabrovka in the Municipality of Litija in central Slovenia. The area is part of the traditional region of Lower Carniola. It is now included with the rest of the municipality in the Central Sava Statistical Region.

== History ==
Kumpolje was a hamlet of Gornje Ravne until 1995, when it was made a separate settlement.
