= Tihaboj =

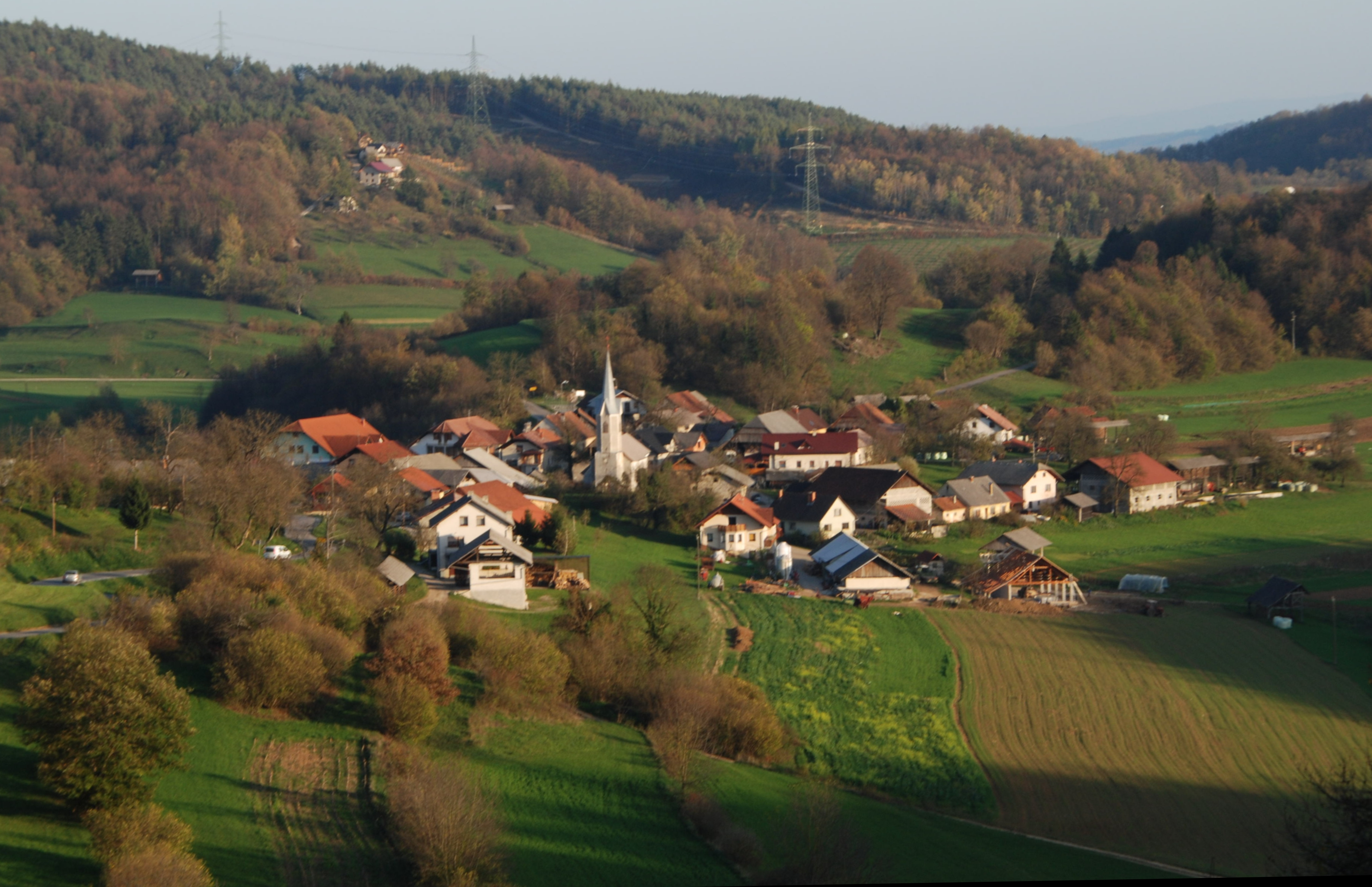

- Location in Slovenia
- Coordinates: 45°59′29.54″N 15°0′33.9″E
- Country: Slovenia
- Traditional region: Lower Carniola
- Statistical region: Central Sava
- Municipality: Litija

Area
  - Total: 2.13 km^{2} (0.82 sq mi)
- Elevation: 374 m (1,227 ft)

Population (2012)
  - Total: ▲97
  - Density: 46/km^{2} (120/sq mi)
- Postal code: SI-1274

Tihaboj (pronounced [ˈtiːxabɔi̯]; in older sources also Tihoboj) is a nucleated settlement in the local community of Gabrovka, Municipality of Litija, central Slovenia. It lies on a terrace in the Gabrovka Hills (Slovene: Gabrovško gričevje), a part of the Mirna Valley, along the road connecting Litija and Mirna. The landscape has a fluviokarst character. The settlement comprises the hamlets of Mlake, Orešje, and Psina. The residents mainly live from farming and service activities; many of them drive to work to nearby places.

== Name ==
The name Tihaboj was first attested in 1136 as Tehaboj (other early attestations include Tenchebvo in 1250, Techeloy in 1343, Tethenoy in 1384, Teihawoy in 1436). The medieval inscriptions indicate that the name is derived from *Těxobojь, probably a Slavic personal name derived from *těxa 'consolation' + *bojь 'fight'.

== Church ==
The landmark of the village is the early Baroque church of Saint Mark in the central part of the village, built in the early 17th century, with a late 17th-century octagonal belfry. It belongs to the Parish of the Holy Cross–Gabrovka.

== Other cultural heritage ==
The area of the settlement and the nearby valley of Mlače Creek to the south have been protected as a cultural landscape. On Kostjavc Hill to the northeast, remains of a prehistoric fortification have been excavated, dated to the Hallstattt and the La Tène.

== Notable people ==
Notable people that were born or lived in Tihaboj include:

- Diego Barrios Ross, Venezuelan singer and music teacher
- Vid Jerič, Partisan, lieutenant, politician
- Marjeta Mrhar, missionary
