= Simončič Hayrack =

Hayrack at the southeastern border of Bistrica

Coordinates: 45°57′36″N 15°06′53″E

Simončič Hayrack is a double hayrack (toplar) with three pairs of windows and a very ornamented gable.

Simončič Hayrack, also Simončič Toplar or Blaž Toplar, is a hayrack at the southeastern border of Bistrica in the Municipality of Šentrupert in the traditional region of Lower Carniola. It is known as the largest and the most beautiful hayrack in Slovenia. It was built in 1936 by Janko Gregorčič (officially Janez Gregorčič; 1906–1984), a carpenter from nearby Slovenska Vas, on the order of farmer Jože Simončič. It was designed as a double hayrack (toplar) with wooden pillars, three pairs of windows and a pitched roof. The gable, which is turned towards the road linking the villages of Mirna and Mokronog, is richly decorated with predominantly plant motifs. Simončič Hayrack belongs to the farmstead Bistrica no. 11. Since 2001, it has been protected as a cultural monument of national significance and is the only hayrack in Slovenia with this status. As the most known of over 500 hayracks in the Mirna Valley it supplements the Land of Hayracks, i.e. the museum of hayracks in Šentrupert. Exhibitions of visual arts and other events take place seasonally under its roof, and it is also still used to dry hay and a place to store agricultural machines.
