= Marko Marin (professor) =

Marko Marin (3 April 1930 – 10 January 2015) was a Slovenian theatre director, art historian, professor, and restorer. In 2007, he was named a distinguished professor at the University of Ljubljana. In Lower Carniola, he was especially well known for his almost 50 years of work in the renovation of Mirna Castle near Mirna, started in 1962.

== Life and work ==
Marko Marin was born in Gabrovka near Litija, Kingdom of Yugoslavia. He received a bachelor's degree in art history in 1958 and in theatre direction in 1963, and earned his master's degree in art history in 1972. He worked for six years with young actors in Koper as a theatre director and then took a job as a professor of theatre direction at the Academy of Theatre, Radio, Film and Television (AGRFT) of the University of Ljubljana, where he delivered lectures in the history of theatre. For two terms, he was a regular deputy of Yugoslavia at the International Federation for Theatre Research (IFTR). He delivered lectures at the universities of Leipzig, Vienna, and Barcelona, and he researched Jesuit drama, the Škofja Loka Passion Play, and Ruše religious drama.
