= Lojze Grozde =

Slovenian writer

Blessed Lojze Grozde
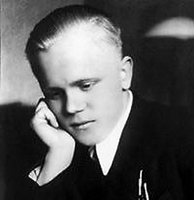
- Lojze Grozde as pupil

Martyr
- Born: 27 May 1923; Zgornje Vodale, Kingdom of Serbs, Croats and Slovenes
- Died: 1 January 1943 (aged 19); Mirna, Kingdom of Italy (now Slovenia)
- Venerated in: Roman Catholic Church
- Beatified: 13 June 2010, Celje Slovenia by Cardinal Tarcisio Bertone
- Major shrine: Sanctuary of Our Lady at Zaplaz in Slovenia
- Feast: 27 May
- Attributes: book, palm, snowdrop
- Patronage: pupils, Catholic Action, poets, students, Slovenia

Lojze Grozde (27 May 1923 – 1 January 1943) was a Slovenian student who was murdered by Partisans during World War II. His death is recognised as martyrdom by the Catholic Church. He was beatified on 13 June 2010.

== Early life ==
Grozde was born on 27 May 1923 in the small village of Zgornje Vodale near Mokronog in Lower Carniola, Slovenia. He was an illegitimate child. When he was four years old, his mother married France Kovač. His stepfather chased Grozde away whenever he wanted to see his mother. Later, because Grozde was a good pupil, the stepfather became friendlier towards him, and so he remained at the house and his aunt took care of him. She saw to his schooling and sent him to a school in Ljubljana, where she was working as a servant. Some benefactors helped her support her nephew. He stayed at the Marijanišče boarding school and attended the Classical Secondary School (Klasična gimnazija) in Ljubljana. There he was a good student, and he also found time to write poetry and prose. He was a member of the Catholic Action religious movement and a member of the Marian Congregation of Slovene Divinity Students and Priests. The later part of his high school years coincided with the early years of World War II. Under these strained circumstances, Grozde became increasingly religious and was leaning towards the study of theology and the priesthood, but he was killed in the last year of his high school studies.

== Death ==
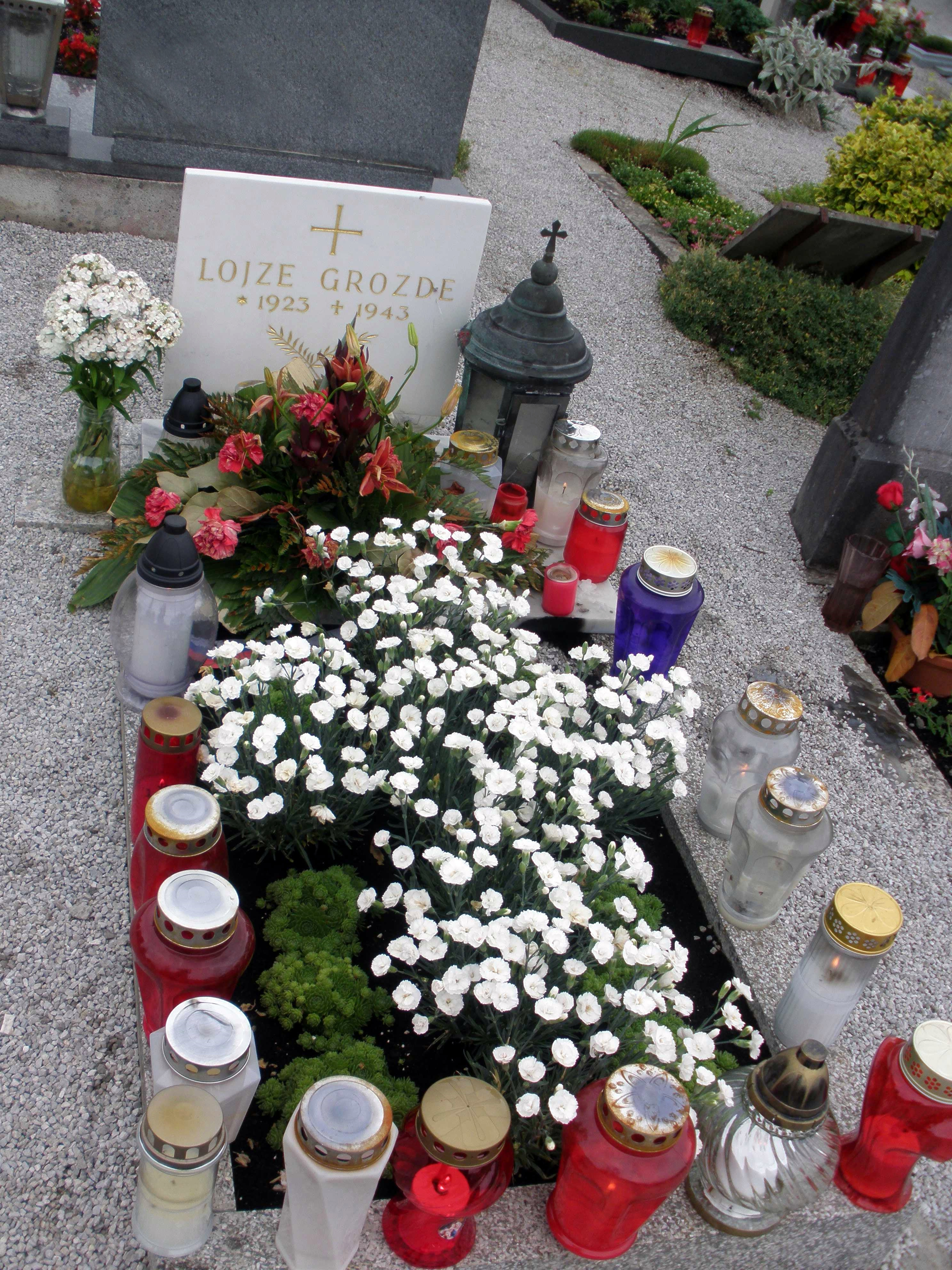
Grave of Lojze Grozde was in Šentrupert

During his summer vacation of 1942 he did not go home because there was a lot of violence in the countryside and it was not easy to travel. It was only for New Year 1943 that he decided to visit his mother and other relatives. He asked for a permit to travel home. First he visited a friend of his at the village of Struge. On 1 January 1943, the first Friday, he attended mass at the monastery at Stična, where he received the last communion of his life; then he travelled by train from Ivančna Gorica to Trebnje, where he found he could not travel further because the rails had been destroyed. He decided to continue towards Mirna on foot, and on the way he rode in a cart. By the time the cart had reached Mirna, it was pulled over by the Slovenian partisans and he was seized and interrogated. On him they found a devotional book, The Imitation of Christ by Thomas a Kempis and a booklet on Our Lady of Fatima. He was taken to a nearby inn and interrogated, tortured, and killed in a forest near Mirna. Three hours earlier the seminarian Janez Hočevar, who wanted to visit his relatives in nearby Šentrupert, had been also shot. The communists suspected Lojze Grozde of being an informant.

Soon, rumours spread about Grozde's grisly death. The Tone Tomšič Partisan Brigade, which had occupied Mirna, carried out the murder. However, others claimed that Grozde was not tortured. Partisan General Lado Kocijan stated that:

"for the partisan tribunal, Grozde was a White Guard courier, and so he was condemned to death. It is not true that they tortured him, that they cut the skin from the soles of his feet, cut out his tongue and cut off his fingers. Because the Partisans buried his body in a shallow grave, these injuries were caused by the animals in the woods, which gnawed on the body. There was no torture ...", this veteran of the Gubec Brigade stated.

Other sources state that he was tortured:

During the Christmas holidays of 1942 Grozde was traveling in Lower Carniola to visit his mother and relatives, but did not come home. In the village of Mirna he was seized by the communists, fearfully tortured for two hours, and then killed. It is said that he patiently endured this torment.

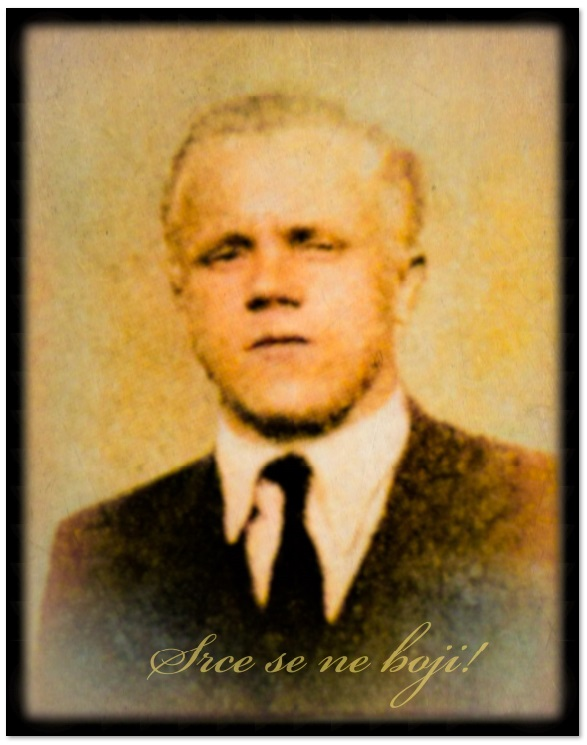
Blessed Lojze Grozde

On 23 February 1943 the fate of Lojze Grozde was partly revealed, indicating that he had been tortured. Schoolchildren picking snowdrops found his corpse. Although there were traces of torture on his body, the corpse itself was uncorrupted. His body was taken to nearby Šentrupert, where a committee made a report. The body of Lojze Grozde was buried at the cemetery in Šentrupert because it was impossible to take it to his home parish of Tržišče under the difficult circumstances of those days. The news of the violent torture and death of this innocent student struck fear among people and shocked the students in Ljubljana.

More than 60 years later, a document was found in the archives, written shortly after the death of Grozde by Dušan Majcen (nom de guerre Nedeljko), the politcommisar of the Tone Tomšič Partisan Brigade, stating that there was no proof of Grozde being an informant. Majcen regretted he had not been involved in the interrogation of Grozde as he would have otherwise prevented his killing.

== Beatification ==
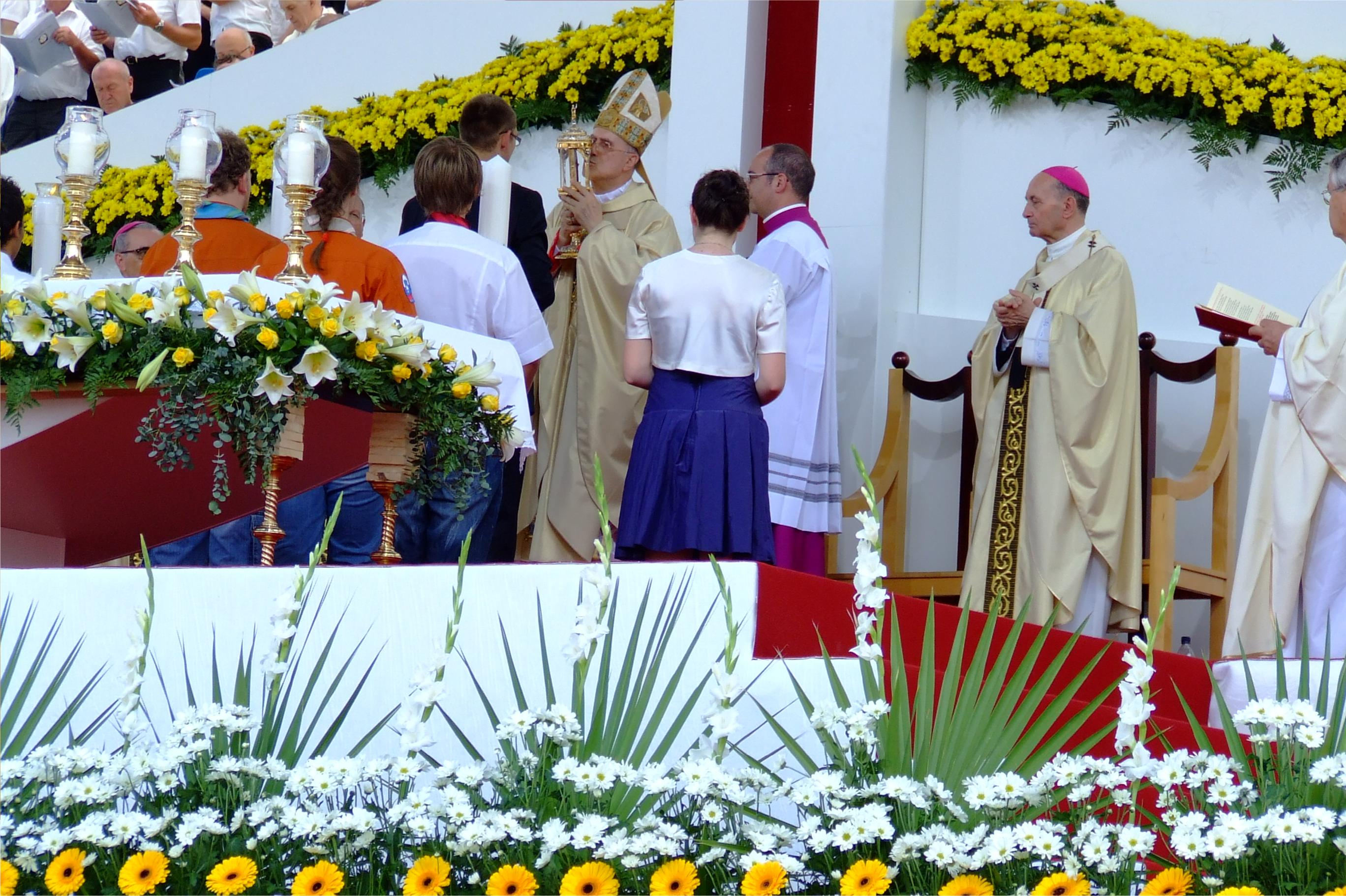
Beatification of Lojze Grozde in Celje (2010)

On the 50th anniversary of Grozde's death, the Archdiocese of Ljubljana started a process to recognize his martyrdom and also his beatification and canonization. When Pope John Paul II visited Slovenia for the first time in 1996, he mentioned Grozde twice. He said, "The servant of God Lojze Grozde is just one of innumerable innocent victims of Communism that raise the palm of martyrdom as an indelible memory and admonition. He was a disciple of Christ."

On 27 March 2010 it was announced from Rome that Pope Benedict XVI had affirmed the martyrdom of Lojze Grozde. Beatification took place at the First Slovenian Eucharistic congress in Celje on 13 June 2010, celebrated by Cardinal Tarcisio Bertone in the presence of about 40,000 pilgrims.

Grozde's remains were translated in 2011 to the Marian shrine at Zaplaz, where a special side altar was created on the right side of the church, decorated with a mosaic by Marko Ivan Rupnik. Relics of Lojze Grozde have been placed in the altar at St. Joseph's Church in Celje, the Chapel of the Good Shepherd at Alojzij Šuštar Elementary School in Ljubljana and many other churches in Slovenia.

== Legacy ==
In his introduction to the biography of Lojze Grozde by Anton Strle, who is also a candidate for sainthood, Taras Kermauner wrote: "Grozde combines the ardour and apostolate of Friderik Baraga, the asceticism and suffering of Janez Frančišek Gnidovec, a gift for organization, and the Slovenian national consciousness of Blessed Anton Martin Slomšek ... He symbolizes the entire martyrdom suffered by Christians and Catholic Slovenians during World War II and afterwards for their affiliation to their faith ... His personality should be returned to the common Slovenian consciousness of heroes that have been praised and elevated to the first plane as the only models. Today a man like Grozde is needed as our model – a martyr, a saint. Not a man of aggressive military action thinking he will put forward God with arms and the blood of other or foreign people ... I do not fear to write that Grozde belongs among the greatest young Slovenians; that his attitude is fitting and most precious."

== Film and TV ==
- Srce se ne boji (My Heart is not Afraid) A documentary film about a boy whose life became a legend by Studio Siposh (2019), Slovenian with subtitles in English, Spanish and Italian, available online. This documentary film presents the short but remarkable life of Lojze Grozde, from his childhood during the interwar period in the poor Slovenian countryside to his life as a student in Ljubljana and finally his tragic death. The film features interviews as well as dramatized reenactments that try to portray this young and fervent Catholic in a more personal way. The interviewees are experts, historians, and ordinary people who have come into contact with him or his story. The role of Alojzij Grozde is played by three young actors, who present him in different periods of his life: Lovro Berkopec (5 years old), Jaka Piščanc (10 years old), and Alex Centa (15–19 years old). The documentary was mostly filmed in the Lower Carniola region. It was produced by a team of more than 70, led by producer and director David Sipoš.
- Slovesna maša ob prenosu relikvij bl. Alojzija Grozdeta v Marijino cerkev na Zaplazu (Solemn Mass and Translation of Grozde's Relics to Zaplaz) Transmitted by RTV Slovenija (2011).
- Moj glas zliva se v prošnjo (My Voice Melts Together in Supplication – Slovenian) Documental Emission – Film on RTV Slovenia-1, Programm One with Archbishop and Metropolite from Belgrade Stanislav Hočevar, Jesuit Miha Žužek and others (2010).

== Literature ==
- Duhovni koledarček 1944, Sestavil župnik Gregor Mali, Ljubljana, Knjižice Nr. 239/240 from 1 December 1943.
- Narte Velikonja, Malikovanje zločina, in: Wikivir.
- Anton Strle: Un martyr des temps modernes. Aloïs Grozdé, 1923–1943, Paris 1957
- Anton Strle, Slovenski mučenec Lojze Grozde, Založba Knjižice, Ljubljana 1991, OCLC 28129865.
- Anton Pust, Zdravko Reven, Božidar Slapšak, Palme mučeništva: Ubiti in pomorjeni slovenski duhovniki, redovniki in bogoslovci in nekateri verni laiki, Celje 1995. 447 sites. – ISBN 961-218-043-1
- Papež Janez Pavel II. v Sloveniji, Bog blagoslovi predrago Slovenijo, Edition Družina, 160 pages, Ljubljana 1996, ISBN 961-222-079-4
- Miroslav Slana:Slovenski sij svetosti. Mladi mučenec Lojze Grozde, Maribor 2001 ISBN 961-6227-59-9.
- Milanka Dragar Zvest Križanemu, Knjiga o Grozdetu, Ljubljana 2010, Založba Dragar, 518 pages, ISBN 978-961-92879-0-3.
- Lojze Grozde Pesmi in proza, Luč sveta, Ljubljana 2011, Založba Družina, 280 pages, ISBN 9789612228361.
- Aloysius Hribšek Blessed Aloysius Grozde, A Teenage Witness for Christ the King, Ljubljana 2012, Založba Družina, 119 pages, ISBN 978-961-222-895-8.
- France M. Dolinar Lojze Grozde (1923-1943), Sveti na Slovenskem, Ljubljana 2018, Založba Družina, 40 pages, ISBN 978-961-04-0498-9.

== See also ==
- Miroslav Bulešić
- István Sándor
- Szilárd Bogdánffy
- József Mindszenty
- János Scheffler
- Francesco Bonifacio
- List of saints
- The Black Book of Communism
