= Dana (company) =

Slovenian beverage manufacturer

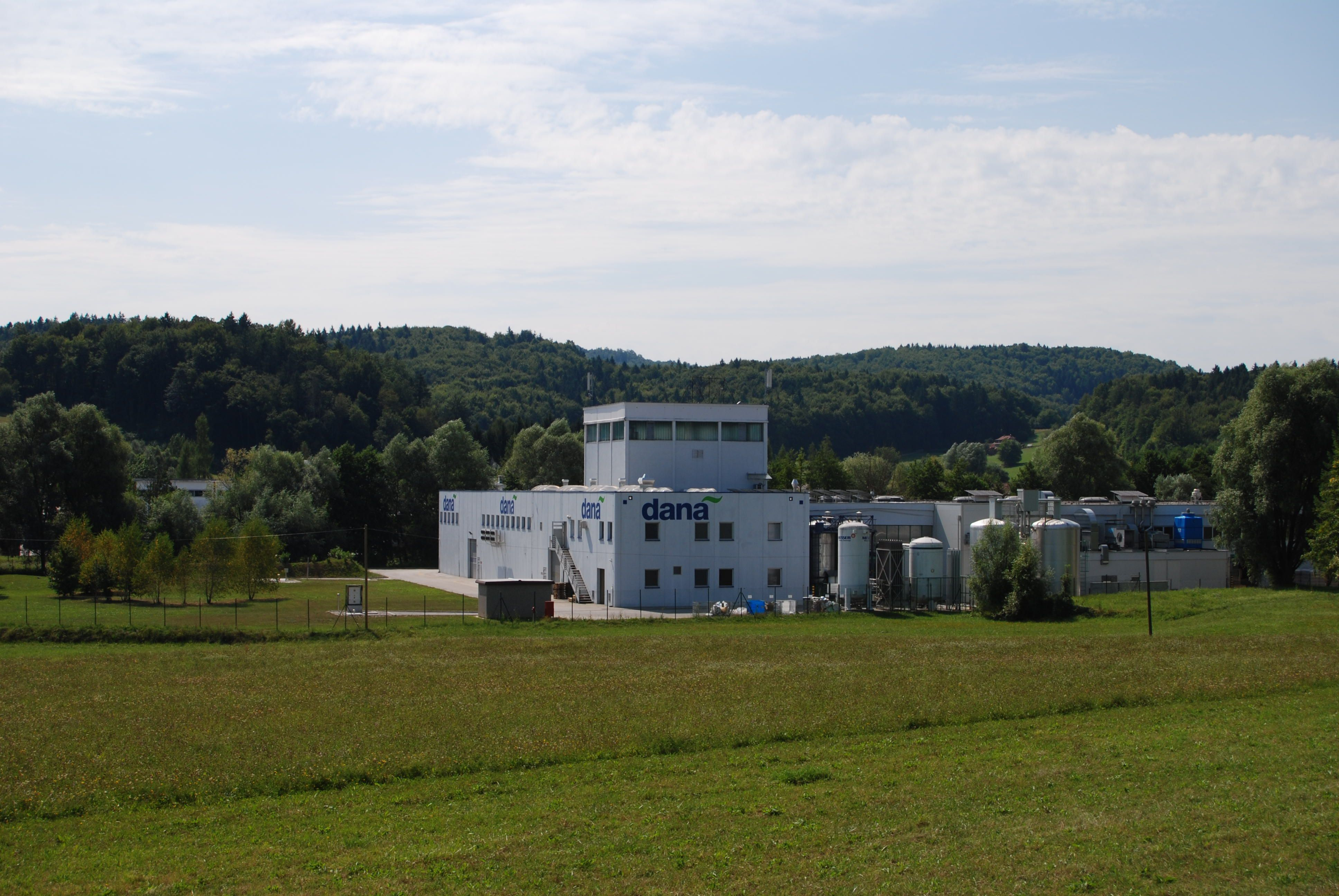
- Company type: Private
- Industry: beverage
- Founded: 1952; 74 years ago
- Headquarters: Mirna, Slovenia
- Key people: Marko Hren (managing director) (2010)
- Products: mineral water, fruit juices, alcoholic beverages
- Revenue: ▲€13 million (2011)
- Net income: 30.000 (2011)
- Owner: Plasta d.o.o. 58.79 %, Franc Frelih 32.43 % (2010)
- Number of employees: 100 (2011)
- Website: http://www.dana.si/en/

Dana, proizvodnja in prodaja pijač ('Dana, the manufacture and sale of drinks') is a major Slovenian manufacturer of alcoholic and non-alcoholic beverages. It is located in the village of Mirna in southeastern Slovenia.

The company was established as a work organization in 1952. The brand Dana was registered in 1955. At first, the company produced only alcoholic beverages. After 1970, the program was expanded with the non-alcohol beverages. Since 2005, Dana has made the majority of profit with its high-quality natural mineral water Dana. In July 2012, the company was transformed from a joint-stock company to a limited liability company. It changed its name from Dana, tovarna rastlinskih specialitet in destilacija, d.d. (English: Dana, the plant specialties factory and distillation) to Dana, proizvodnja in prodaja pijač, d.o.o. (English: Dana, the manufacture and sale of drinks).

In 2000, Dana was ISO 9001 certified. In 2009, it obtained the International Food Standard (IFS) certificate.
