= Hayrack =

Structure with roof for drying hay and other crops

The Simončič Hayrack: a roofed double hayrack in Bistrica

A hayrack (Slovene: kozolec) is a freestanding vertical drying rack found chiefly in Slovenia. Hayracks are permanent structures, primarily made of wood, upon which fodder for animals is dried, although their use is not limited to drying hay. Other foodstuffs such as field maize are dried on them as well. Although it is a practical structure, a hayrack is often artistically designed and handcrafted and is regarded by Slovenes as a distinctive form of vernacular architecture that marks Slovene identity.

== Distribution ==
The hayrack can be found throughout Slovenia except in the Prekmurje region, eastern Styria, and the Slovenian Littoral. Similar structures can also be found in Friuli in Italy, and in southern Carinthia and the East Tyrol region of Austria. In German, it is called Harpfe or Köse. Around 80% of all hayracks are found in Slovenia.

== Names and typology ==
Slovenian names for the hayrack include kozolec and kazuc (colloquial, usually referring to a single straight-line hayrack), stog (commonly found in Upper Carniola and especially in the area around Studor in the Bohinj region), and toplar. Both kozolec and kozuc are probably diminutive forms of kozel 'goat', referring to a branching structure used for holding and drying hay or grain (cf. the similarly motivated German Sägebock and English sawbuck). The word stog also refers to a haystack and is derived from Common Slavic stogъ 'stack, heap'. The word toplar (or doplar) is borrowed from Austrian German Doppler, referring to a double structure in general.

Specific varieties of hayrack include:

- Single straight-line hayrack (enojni stegnjeni kozolec)
- Single straight-line hayrack with catslide roof (stegnjeni kozolec s plaščem)
- Double straight-line hayrack (dvojni stegnjeni kozolec)
- Roofed double hayrack (dvojni vezani kozolec)
- Roofed double hayrack with one strut (dvojni vezani kozolec v eno drevo)
- Roofed double hayrack with two struts (dvojni vezani kozolec v dve drevesi, toplar)
- Roofed double hayrack with extension (toplar z repom)
- Roofed double hayrack with shed (kozolec s hišo)
- Split-level double hayrack (kozolec na kozla, kozolec na psa)
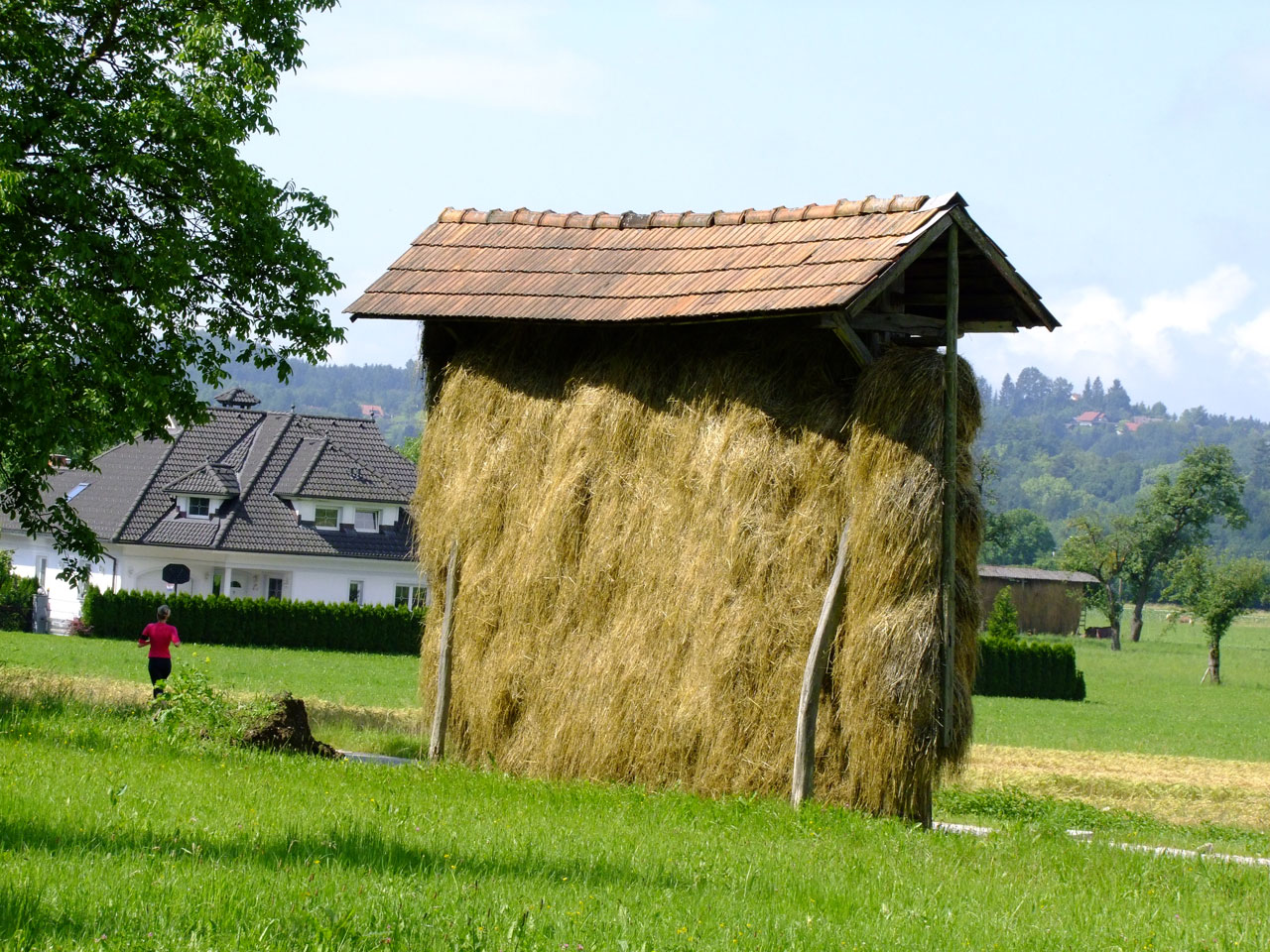
Single straight-line hayrack

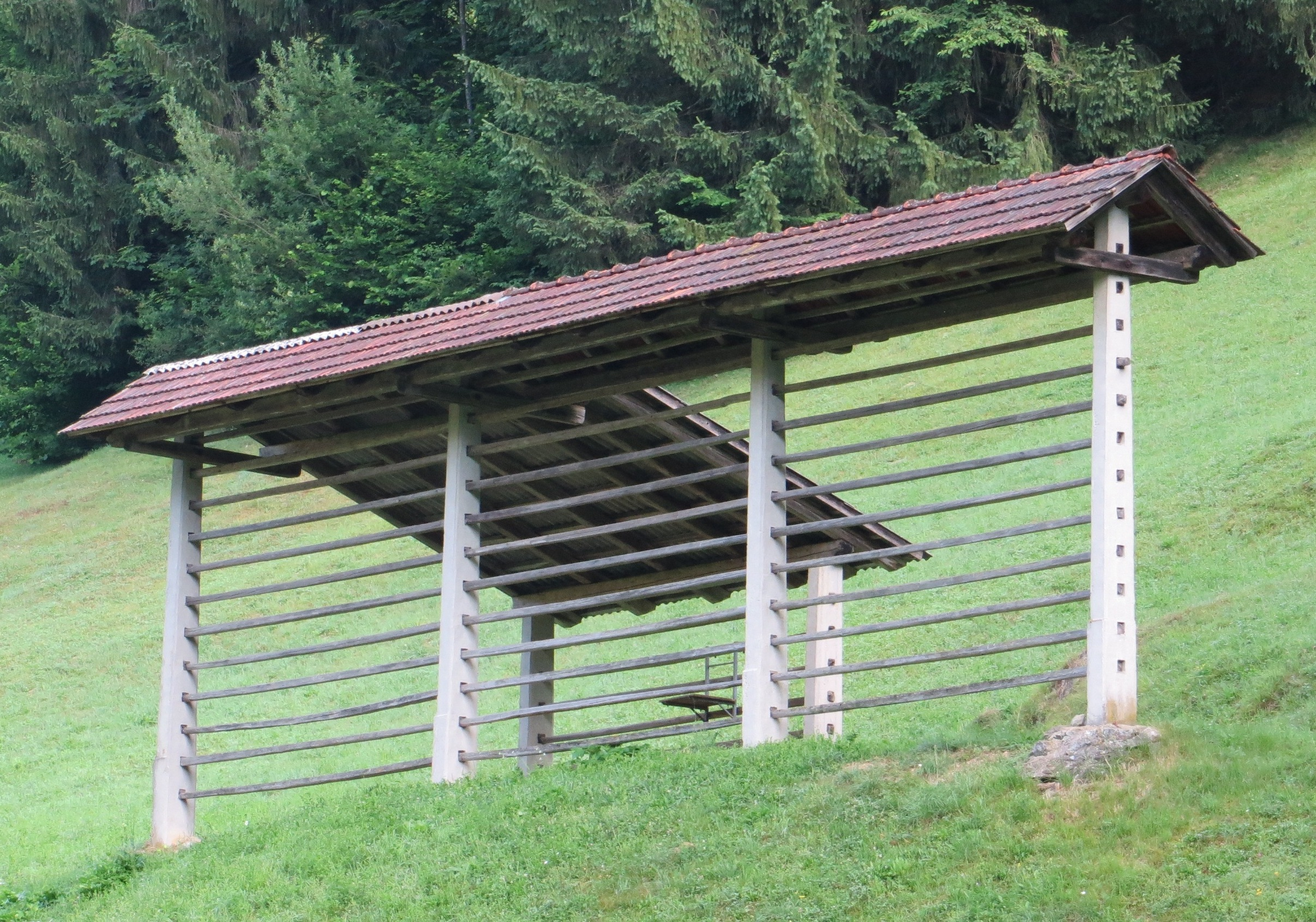
Single straight-line hayrack with catslide roof

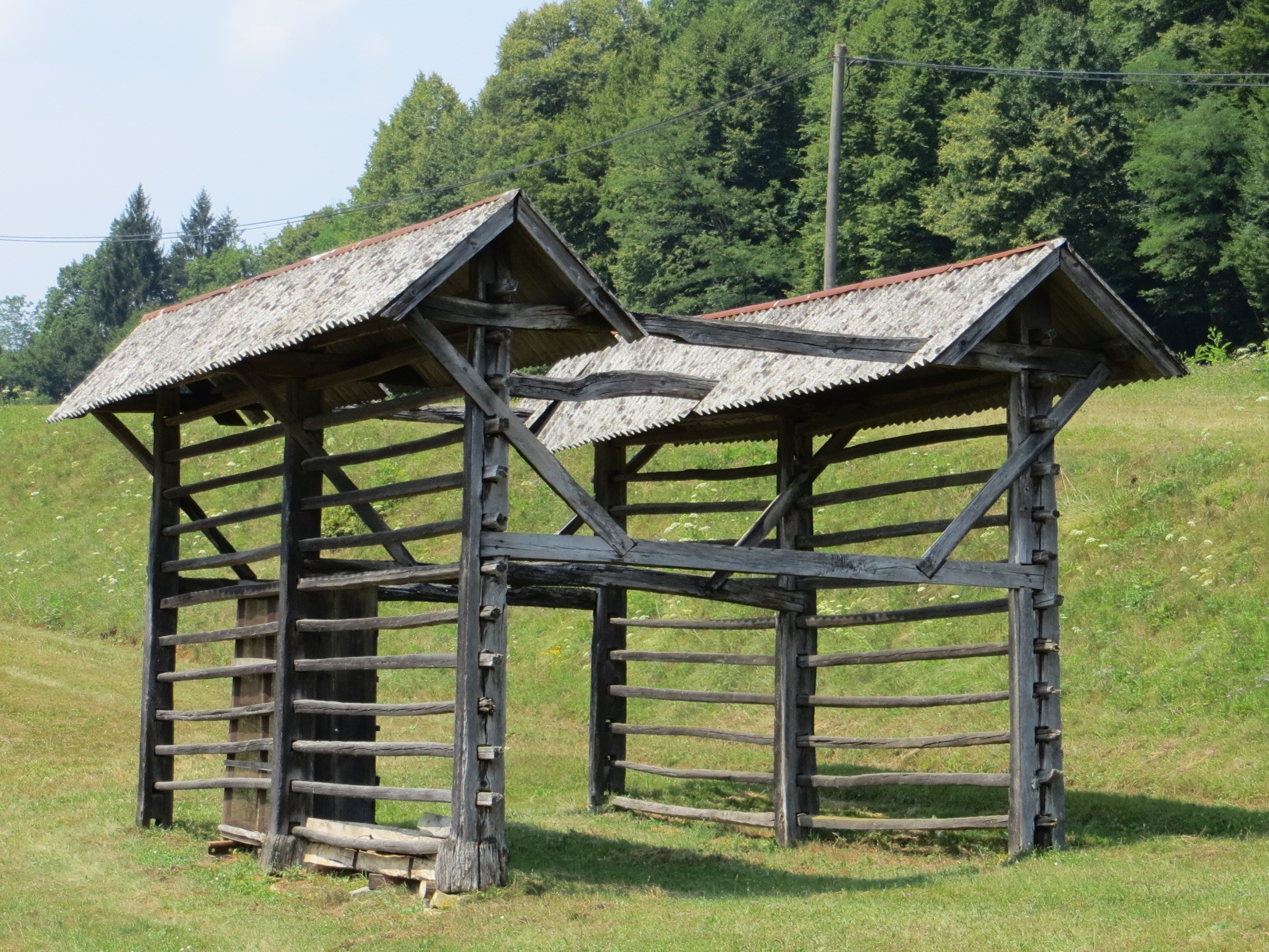
Double straight-line hayrack

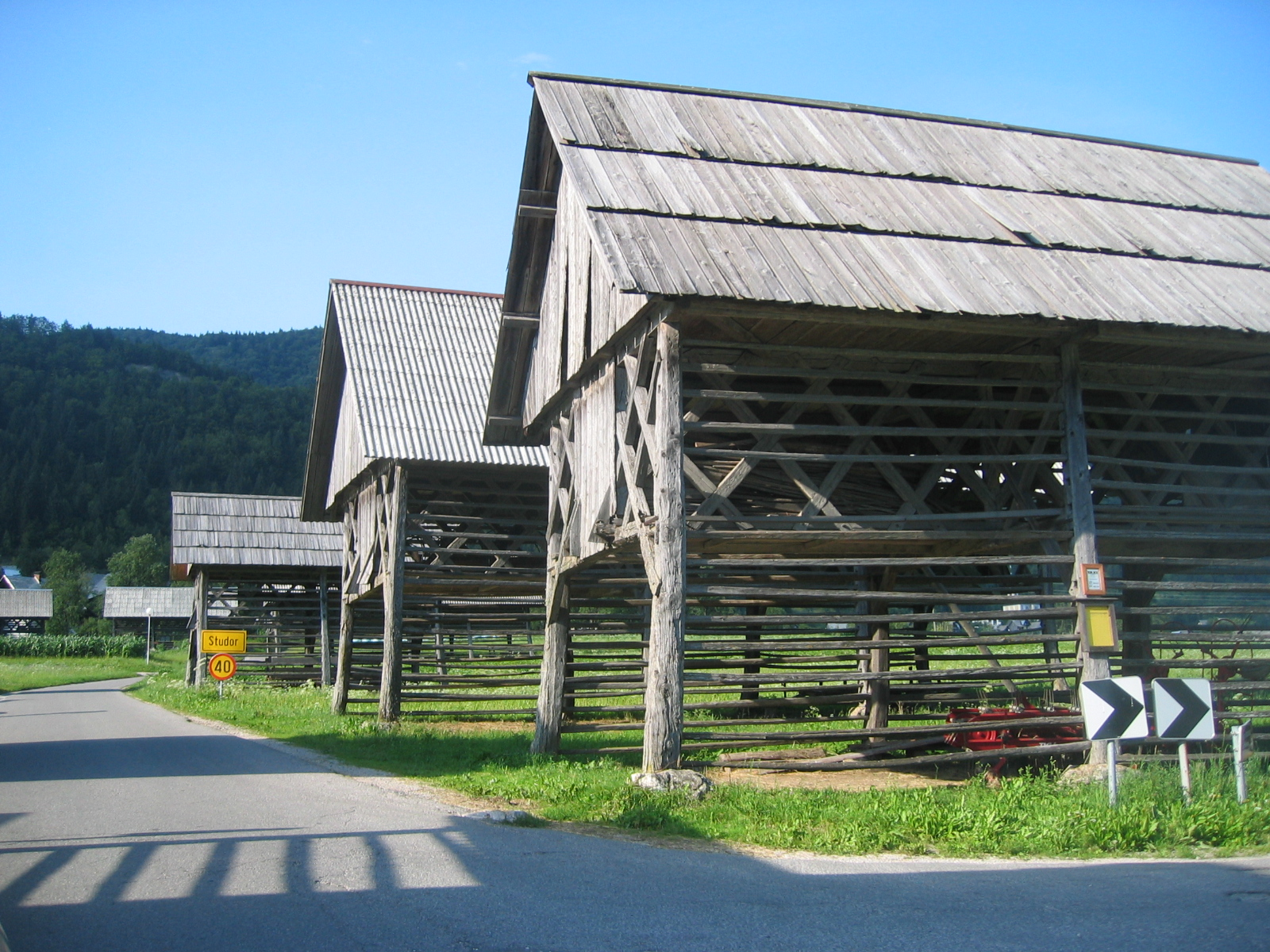
Roofed double hayracks

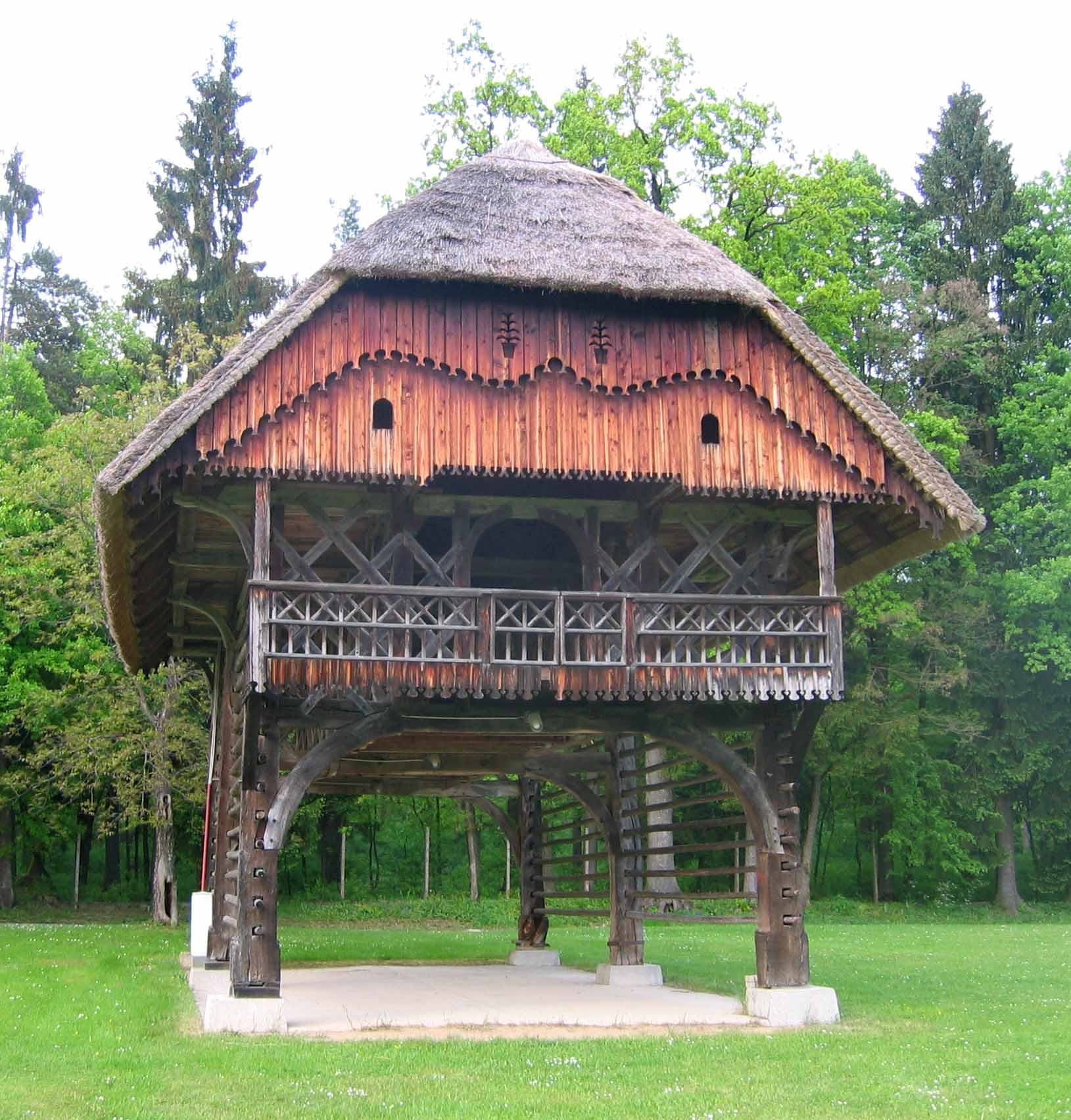
Roofed double hayrack with two struts

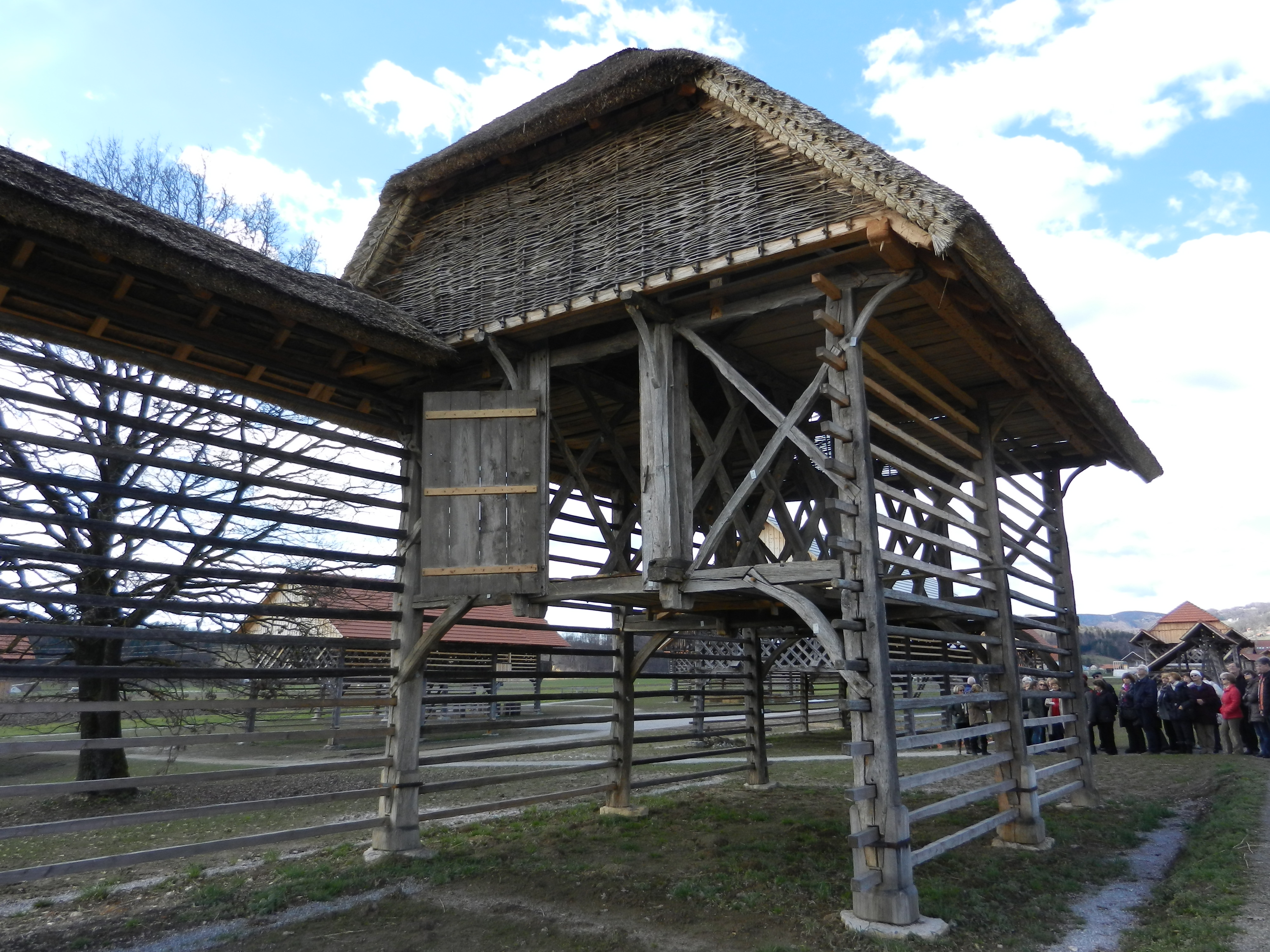
Roofed double hayrack with extension

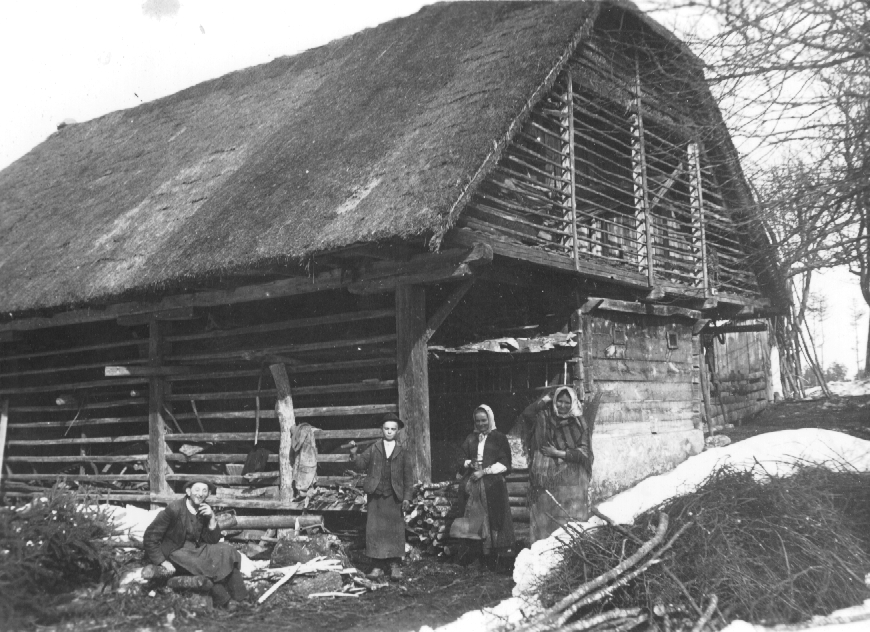
Roofed double hayrack with shed

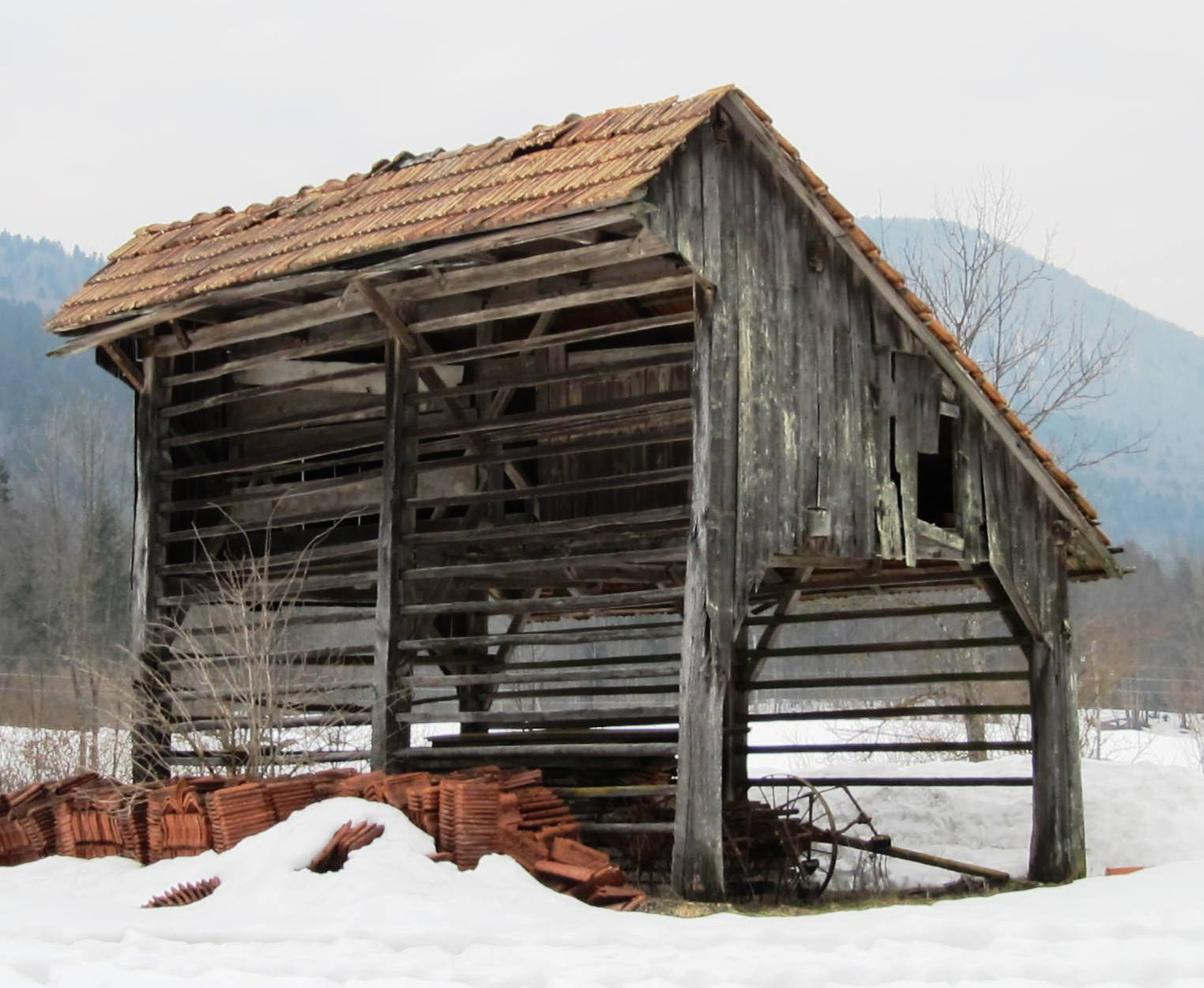
Split-level double hayrack

== Open-air museum ==
From 2010 until 2013, the Municipality of Šentrupert in southeastern Slovenia built the first ever open-air museum "Land of Hayracks" (slovene: Dežela kozolcev) in the southern part of Šentrupert, its administrative center. The collection includes 19 hay drying devices, which includes 17 hayracks, with the oldest from 1795, and presents all types of hayracks. The museum also serves as a venue for events. The main organizer of the project was Rupert Gole, the mayor of Šentrupert. Over 650 hayracks have been counted in the Mirna Valley, where the settlement lies. The largest of them and in the entire country is the Simončič Hayrack.

== Gallery ==
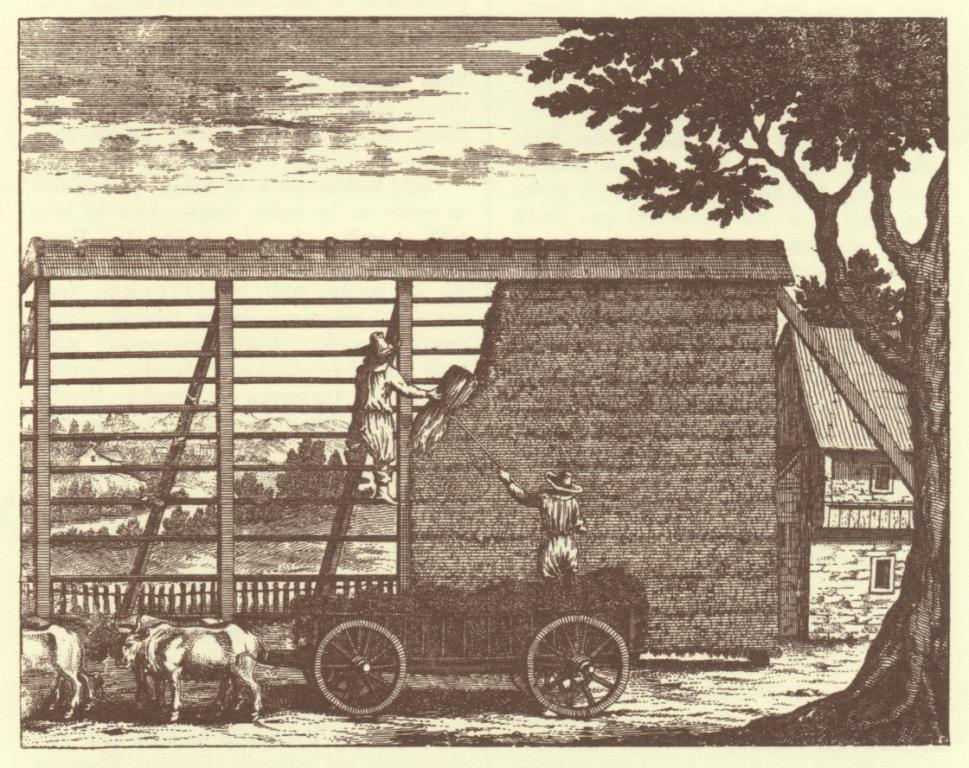
A Valvasor copperplate engraving depicts filling a hayrack with hay

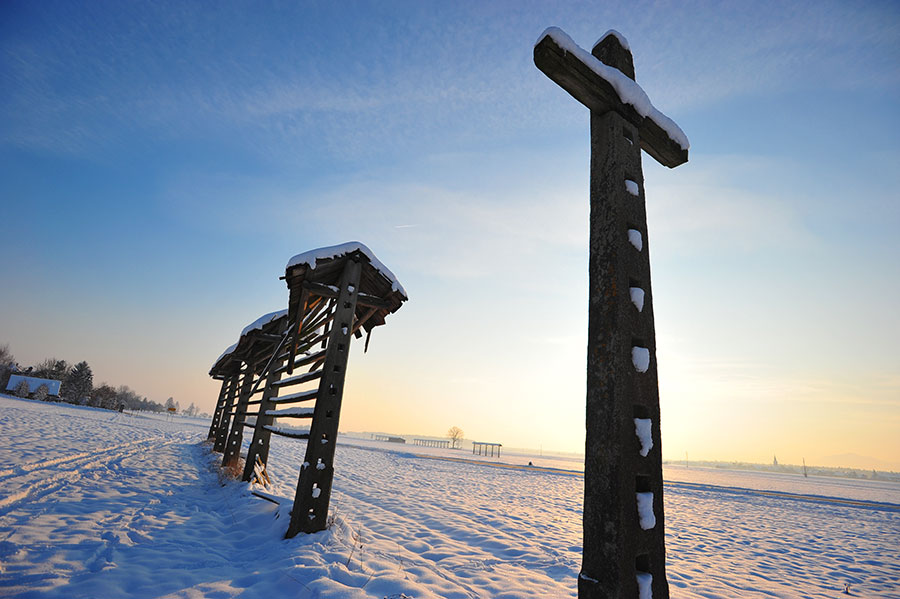
An abandoned single straight-line hayrack just outside Olševek in winter

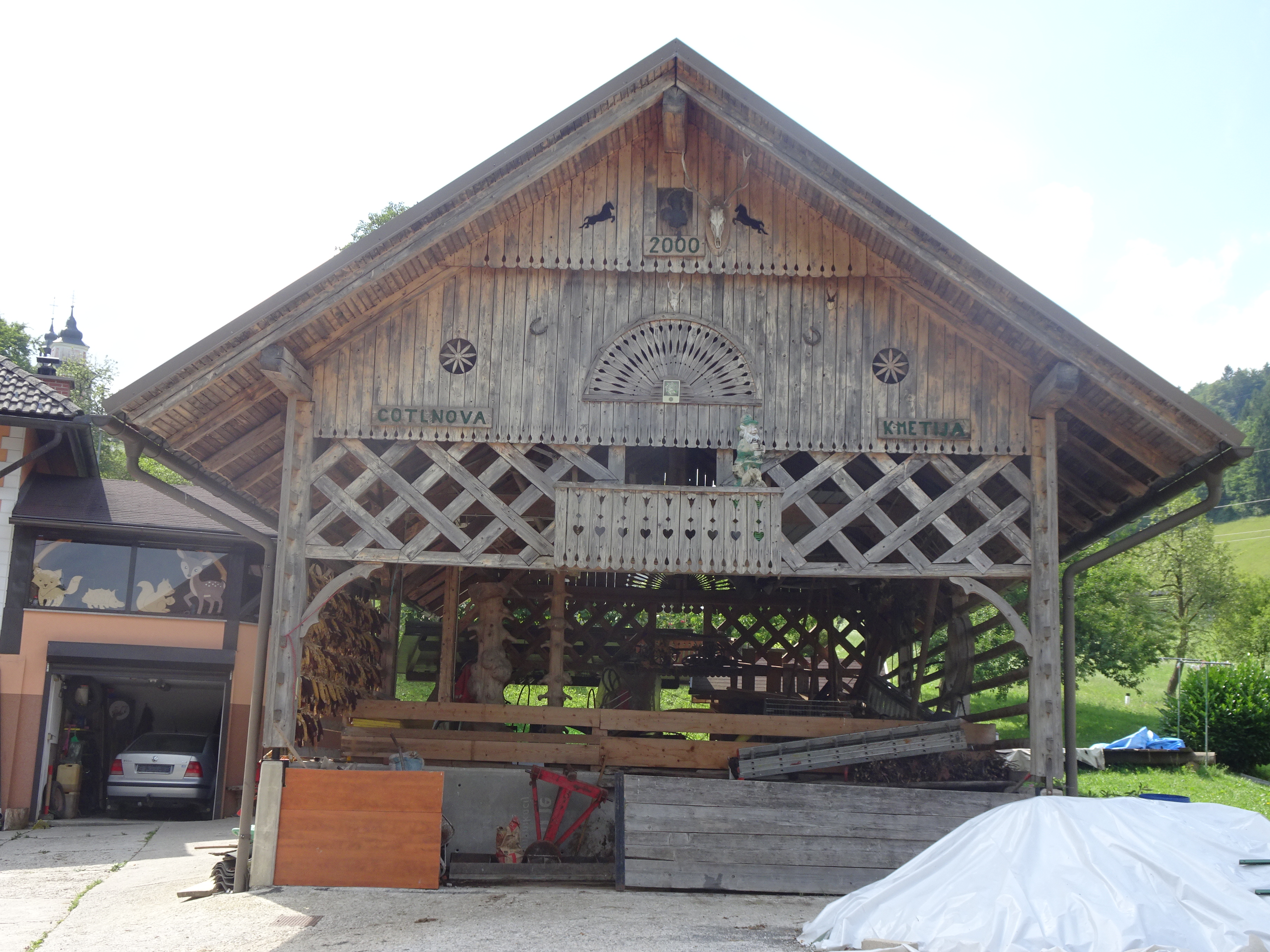
Double hayrack in Motnik, Tuhinj Valley
