= Mirna, Mirna =

Mirna
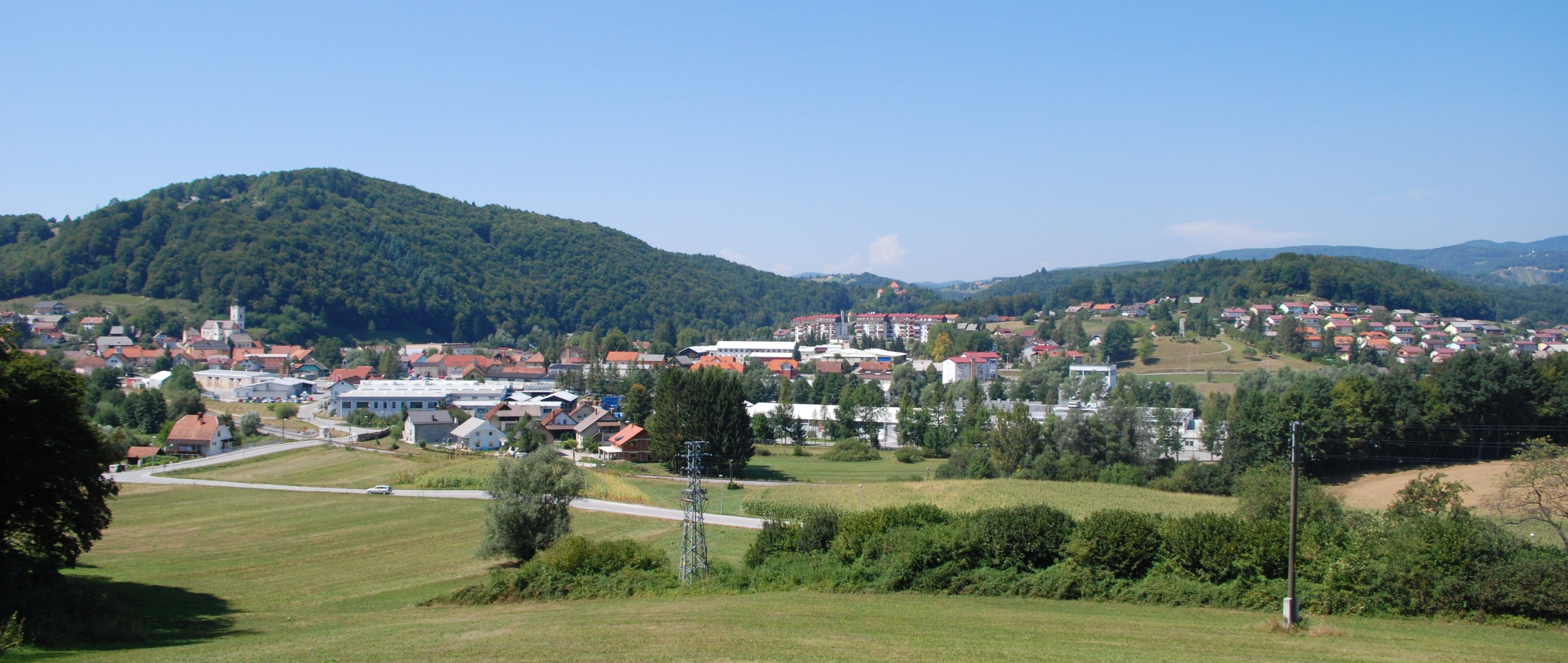
- Mirna and the Mirna Valley as seen from above St. Helena's Church

- Coat of arms

- Location in Slovenia
- Coordinates: 45°56′51.19″N 15°3′59.04″E
- Country: Slovenia
- Traditional region: Lower Carniola
- Statistical region: Southeast Slovenia
- Municipality: Mirna

Area
  - Total: 3.9 km^{2} (1.5 sq mi)
- Elevation: 263 m (863 ft)

Population (1 January 2012)
  - Total: 1,371
  - Density: 347/km^{2} (900/sq mi)
- Postal code: 8233
- Area code: 07
- Website: www.mirna.si

Mirna (pronounced [ˈmìːɾna, ˈmíːɾna]; German: Neydeck or Neudegg) is a nucleated village and a minor economic centre in central Lower Carniola, Slovenia. It is the largest settlement of the Mirna Valley and the seat of the Municipality of Mirna. It is situated at the crossing of regional roads and a confluence of several creeks with the Mirna River, along the railway line linking Sevnica and Trebnje.

== History ==
Archaeological finds prove that the area was settled in the Copper Age, while evidence for habitation exists for nearby sites such as Kincelj nad Trbincec (in Trbinc). Mirna was first mentioned in 1180, with reference to the local Mirna Castle, which was at the time managed by vassals of Aquileia. In the 17th century a stone bridge was built, connecting the right and left banks of the city, which exists to this day.

== Geography ==
The village lies at the westernmost part of the Mirna–Mokronog basin in the Mirna Valley, mainly at raised terraces safe from flooding. To the southwest from Mirna stretches the Vejar Basin, connected with the Mirna–Mokronog basin by a narrow glen. It is included into the statistical region of Southeastern Slovenia.

The crossroad of the regional roads R1-215, connecting Trebnje and Mokronog, and R2-417, connecting Mirna, Tihaboj, and Moravče, and the confluence of the Lipoglavščica, the Zabrščica, and the Vejar Creeks with the Mirna are located in the settlement. The part of the R1-215 road traversing Mirna was until July 1996 named 3rd Battalion of the Army of the National Security Street (Cesta III. bataljona VDV) and is now named Main Street (Glavna cesta).

The larger part of the older part of Mirna is situated on the left bank of the river, and a smaller part on the right bank. Both parts are connected by a stone bridge dating to the 18th century and a wooden footbridge next to it. The oldest part of the town with St. John's the Baptist church lies at the foot and the southwestern slope of the Trbinc Hill, whereas the younger part has grown at the ridge on the other side of the Mirna river, which turns 90° here. The lowest parts along the Mirna banks have been settled by industry, which employs people from the whole basin as well as the nearby hilly areas.

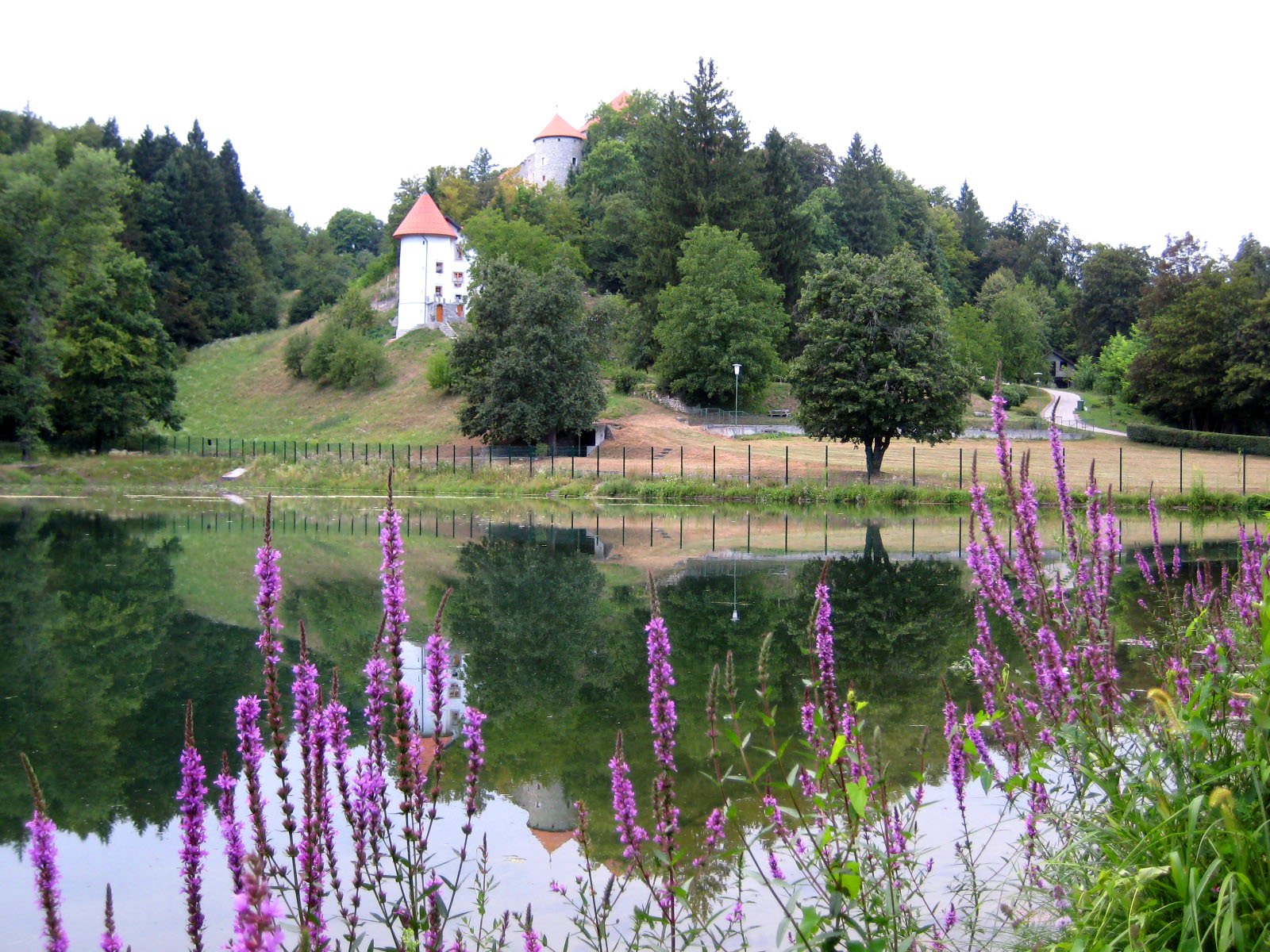
Mirna Pond

Due to its basin location and a temperature inversion, Mirna has a bit lower average temperatures (around 9 °C or 48 °F) and more hot (above 25 °C or 77 °F) and cold (below 0 °C or 32 °F) days than the villages on hills. There is also less wind, the predominant being the north and the southwestern wind. There is more fog, particularly from August to January. The average annual precipitation is 1,165 mm (45.9 in), classifying the climate of the area as moist. It occurs all over the year, least in winter (January and February) and more in summer (June, July, and August) as well as in autumn (November).

Outside the village, near the western border of the settlement, stands Mirna Castle (Grad Mirna). It is situated on a relief pier, at the extreme edge of the Upper Hill (Gorenjska Gora). Mirna Pond (ribnik Mirna), used as a swimming pool in the past and now primarily by fishermen, is situated under the castle. It was created at the end of the 1960s by damming of the Vejar. A jogging path leads past it. There are also the confluence of the Mirna and the Vejar and a bridge across the Mirna. A plain with flood-meadows stretches from the castle to the village.

Mirna Cave (Jama pri Mirni), also known as Roje Cave (Jama na Rojah), (45°57′21″N 15°03′35″E), is a fossil (i.e. not forming anymore) and isolated karst spring cave situated in the northern part of the settlement. It is 115 metres (377 ft) long and 7 m (23 ft) deep. It was discovered on 8 September 1939 by the Underground Cave Exploration Society (Društvo za raziskavanje podzemskih jam) from Ljubljana. It serves as an illegal waste dump.

== Economy and demographics ==
Until the middle of the 19th century, the inhabitants made their living by farming. Then, a spinning mill and a tannery appeared in the settlement. Since 1908, a railway has connected Mirna with the towns of Trebnje and Sevnica, with a station in the southern part of the settlement. The settlement was electrified after 1920. Due to the development of infrastructure, the existence of trades, the start of industry, and a vision, Mirna surpassed nearby Šentrupert and Mokronog as the centre of the Mirna Valley. Currently, Mirna is industrially the most developed settlement in the valley with the largest number of workplaces. Major companies in Mirna include Dana, Droga Kolinska, Tomplast, and JGZ Pohorje. Tourism has been gaining in importance.

Since 1961, the number of inhabitants in Mirna has tripled. It was 292 in 1869, 274 in 1900, 417 in 1931, 550 in 1961, 882 in 1971, 1183 in 1981, 1500 in 1991, 1465 in 2002, and 1374 in 2010. The local dialect is the Eastern Lower Carniolan subdialect.

== Sport ==
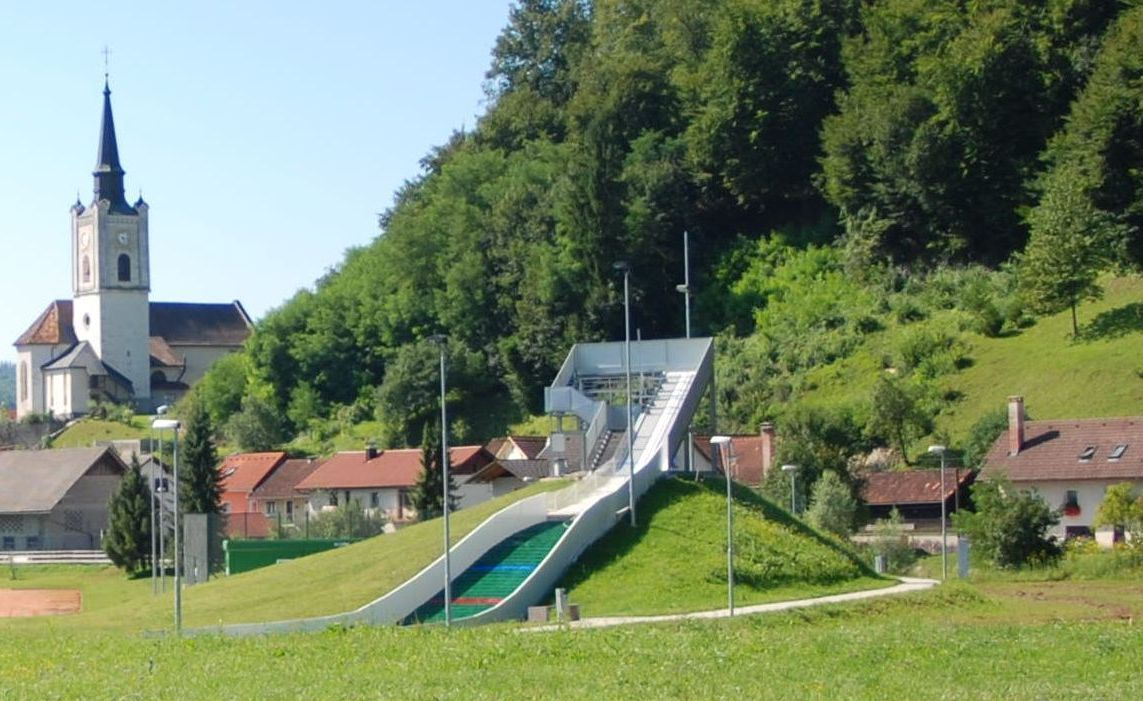
The ski jumping hill in Mirna

The main sports practiced in Mirna are association football, badminton, and ski jumping. The Mirna Football Club was established in 1967 and as of June 2012 has about 120 registered players, up to 14 years old. The Mirna Badminton Club was established in 1991 and reaches the highest places among Slovenian clubs. The most known ski jumper from Mirna is Maja Vtič, who placed fifth in the 2011 World Championship. A ski jumping hill stands behind the building of the Mirna Post Office in the western part of the settlement. It is eight meters (26 feet) tall and was completed in 2011.

== Municipal centre ==
Mirna was a municipal centre before World War II. After the war, it was a municipal centre from the establishment of municipalities in Slovenia in 1952 until 1959, when the Municipality of Mirna merged with the Municipality of Trebnje.

In November 2009, residents of the parish of Mirna voted in a referendum in support of secession from the Municipality of Trebnje and the establishment of an independent municipality, but the act enacting this was rejected in April 2010 by the National Assembly, mainly because it also included the establishment of the Municipality of Ankaran.

On 1 February 2011, the National Assembly passed another act on the establishment of the Municipality of Mirna. That happened after the Constitutional Court of Slovenia had ordered in December 2010 the National Assembly to establish the Municipality of Mirna within two months and to call the election to its municipal council within 20 days after the establishment. Mirna regained its position as a municipal centre on 26 February 2011.

== Main sights ==
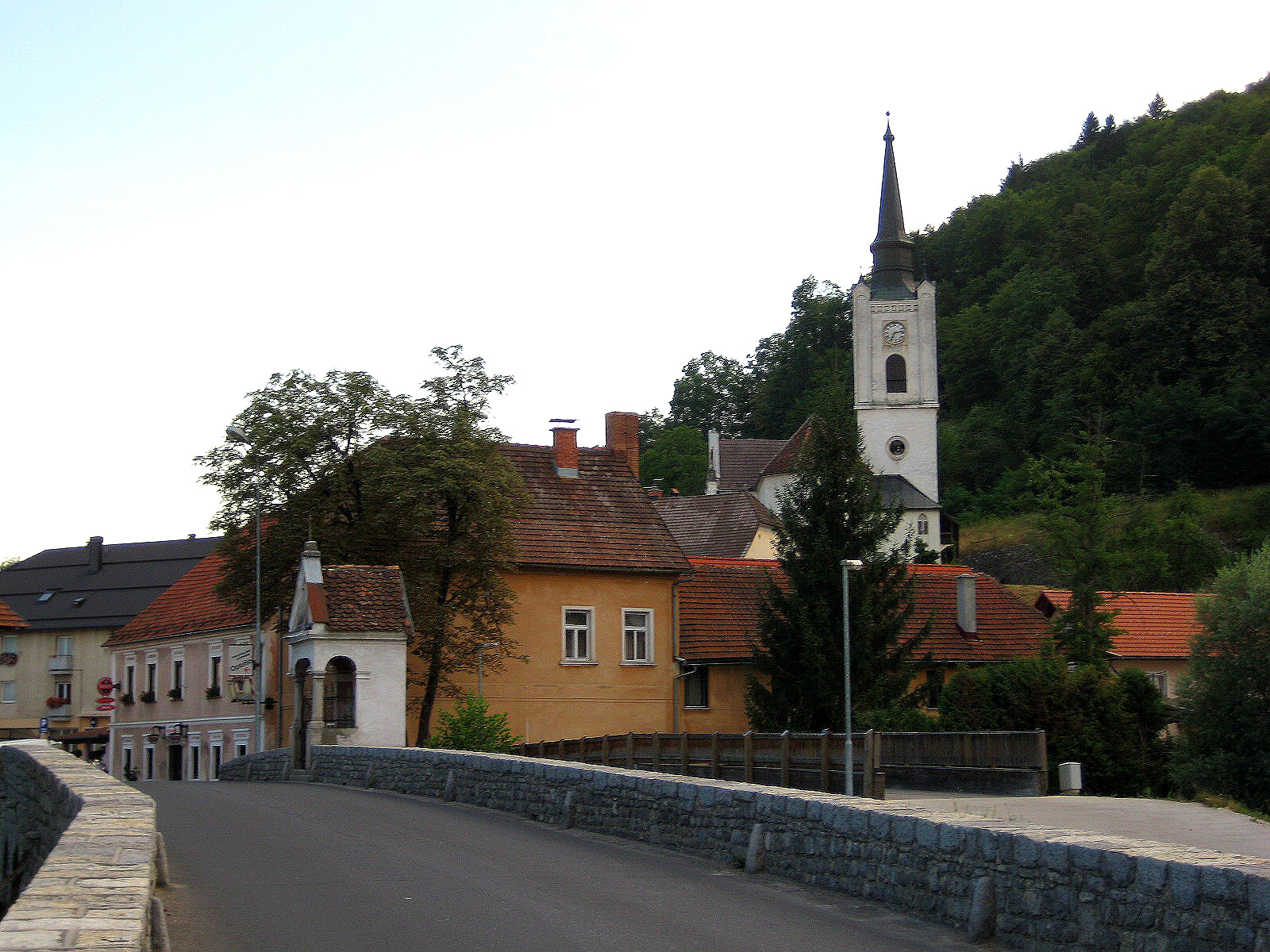
The central bridge over the Mirna River and the Gothic church of Saint John the Baptist

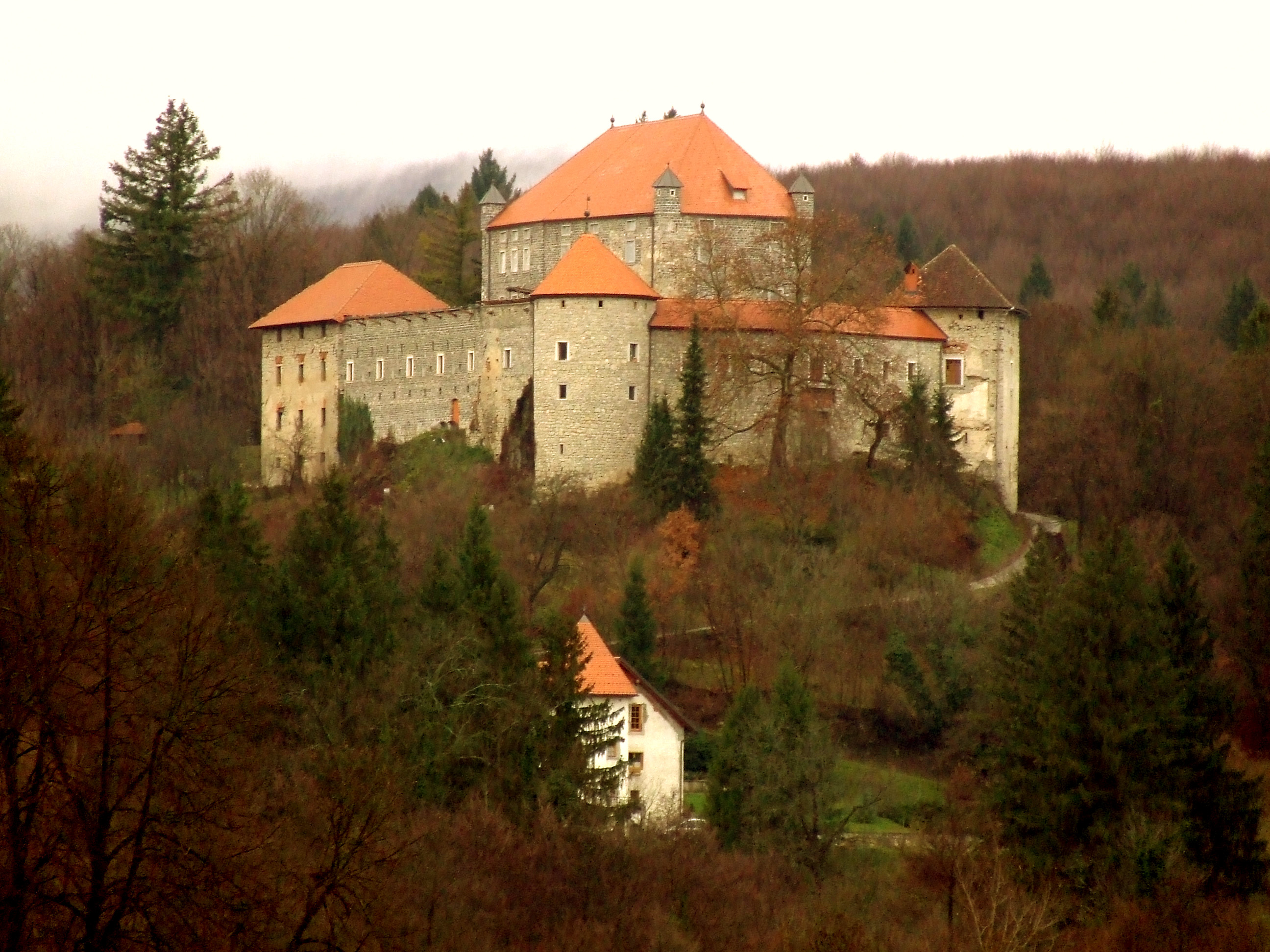
Mirna Castle

The main sights in Mirna are:

- Mirna Castle (Slovene: Grad Mirna), a 12th-century castle, destroyed by the Partisans in December 1942 and restored since 1962 by Marko Marin.
- The central bridge over the Mirna River, part of the main road from Trebnje to Mokronog. It was built in the 18th century as a wooden bridge on the order of Maria Theresa of Austria, and rebuilt in stone in the second half of the 19th century due to heavy traffic and the danger of flooding. There is a chapel on its west pier dedicated to the Holy Cross.
- The core of the village, along the Mirna River and the bridge below the parish church.
- The Gothic parish church dedicated to Saint John the Baptist containing 15th-century and 16th-century frescos. It is on a raised terrace at the western border of the core of the village, at the foot of Trbinc Hill. The parish was established in 1863.
- The Ocvirk hayrack (Slovene: Ocvirkov kozolec), at the southern entrance to Mirna to the left from the main road from Trebnje. It is a single stretched hayrack with ten frames. Between the third and the fifth pillar, it has a projecting roof. The pillars are made from oak, and the laths and the roofing from spruce and fir. It has simple roofing, covered with a double-pitched roof. Originally, it was thatched; however, since 1985, it has been covered with corrugated asbestos-cement roof panels. The hayrack was erected in the second half of the 19th century, on the right side of the road, but was moved to the left side in 1906 after the construction of the railroad started in 1908. A dendrochronological investigation, published in 2006, has shown that it was significantly renovated after 1923. It is part of the Path to Laze 1 homestead.
- The National Liberation Struggle (NOB) monument on the prominence of Roje in the northeastern part of the settlement, above the road from Mirna to Mokronog. It is an obelisk of three concrete pillars, joined in the middle by a metal sphere. 106 combatants are buried in the vault. The monument was erected in 1965 based on plans by the architect Janez Lenassi.
- A church dedicated to Saint Helena, built in the second half of the 18th century. It is in the extreme eastern part of the settlement.
- The Zapuže Manor (Slovene: Graščina Zapuže or Grad Zapuže, German: Schneckenbüchel), in the southeastern part of Mirna. It was built by Erhard von Pelzhofer in 1578 and is said to be named after a large snail found when the foundations were laid (but this is not certain). In the 17th century, it was a refuge of Lutherans.
- The house at Main Street no. 10 (Slovene: Glavna cesta 10), in the southwestern part of the village, along the road to Trebnje. This is a two-story stone house from the first half of the 19th century with a five-axis facade and a wooden balcony on the courtyard side.
- The Kramar farm (Slovene: Kramarjeva domačija), built in the first quarter of the 20th century. It is in the northeastern part of the settlement's nucleus, along the road to Trebnje.
- The two-story building of the Francka Inn (Slovene: Gostilna Pri Francki), in the southwestern part of the settlement, along the main road. It was erected in 1899, and has a five-axis street facade and a stone portal.
- The two-story building of the Kolar Inn (Slovene: Gostilna Kolar), in the southwestern part of the settlement, along the road to Trebnje. It was erected in the second half of the 19th century, and has a five-axis street historicistic facade and a stone portal, closed with a segment arch.
- The house on Laze Road (Slovene: Pot na Laze) no. 1, near the Church of St. John the Baptist, in the southwestern part of the settlement. This is a single-story house, built from stone and into a slope in 1862.
- The Zaplatar farm (Slovene: Zaplatarjeva domačija), built in the 19th century, in the extreme eastern part of the settlement, near the Church of Saint Helena. It consists of a two-story stone-built house from 1838, a single-story outbuilding, a workshop, a smaller workshop with a shed, a toplar (double-rack hayrack with five pairs of frames, built in 1855, and a well.
- The Böhm Mansion (Slovene: Böhmova vila), in the western part of the settlement, opposite the elementary school, at Fužine Street (Slovene: Cesta na Fužine) no. 2. It is a two-story building with a cellar, built in 1908 based on the plans of an unknown German architect, and has well-preserved furniture. It was built by L. Böhm, a professor at the Faculty of Maritime Studies in Rijeka.
- The mansion at Fužine Street no. 8, in the western part of the settlement. It was built in 1930 in the neoromantic style based on plans by the factory owner A. Kolenc and plans by the engineer Šmidt. It has a corner tower, a veranda with arcades, and a front staircase. A garage and a double hayrack with sides of two different heights (Slovene: kozolec na psa) stand next to the house.
- The Škarjat farm (Slovene: Škarjatova domačija), at Main Street no. 21, in the core of the old part of the settlement next to the main road. It consists of a single-story stone house from 1844, an outbuilding with a barn, a pigsty with a workshop, and a double hayrack (toplar).
- The single-story stone building of the Kolenc Inn (Slovene: Gostilna Kolenc), in the village core, next to the crossing of the main road and the road to Fužine. It has a dormer and a five-axis street facade. There is a stone portal in its central axis.

== Notable people ==
The following notable people were born or lived in Mirna:

- Lojze Grozde (1923–1943), Roman Catholic martyr, killed in Mirna during World War II by the Partisans
- Marjan Jenko (1913–2006), lawyer, mayor of Ljubljana from 1960 to 1961
- France Kunstelj (1914–1945), author, playwright, and editor; curate in Mirna 1941–1942
- Rado Lenček (1921–2005), linguist, cultural historian, and ethnologist
- Sandi Leskovec (1936–1997), naïve sculptor
- Marko Marin (born 1930), theatre director, art historian, professor, and restaurator
- Franjo Neubauer (1872–1945), poet and priest
- Ivan Rostan (1872–1957), economist
- Ivan Škarja (1879–1941), lawyer
- Maja Vtič (born 1988), ski jumper, national champion in 2011
