= Gabrovka, Litija =

Gabrovka
- Panorama of Gabrovka

- Location in Slovenia
- Coordinates: 46°0′2.9″N 14°59′12.57″E
- Country: Slovenia
- Traditional region: Lower Carniola
- Statistical region: Central Sava
- Municipality: Litija

Area
  - Total: 1.62 km^{2} (0.63 sq mi)
- Elevation: 388.6 m (1,275 ft)

Population (2002)
  - Total: 252
- Postal code: 1274

Gabrovka (pronounced [ˈɡaːbɾɔu̯ka]) is a settlement in the Municipality of Litija in central Slovenia. The area is part of the traditional region of Lower Carniola. It is now included with the rest of the municipality in the Central Sava Statistical Region; until January 2014 the municipality was part of the Central Slovenia Statistical Region. In addition to the center of the settlement, formerly known as Sveti Križ pri Litiji (German: Heiligenkreuz), it includes the hamlets of Orešje, Pretržje (in older sources also Pretežje), and Trzne.

== Church ==
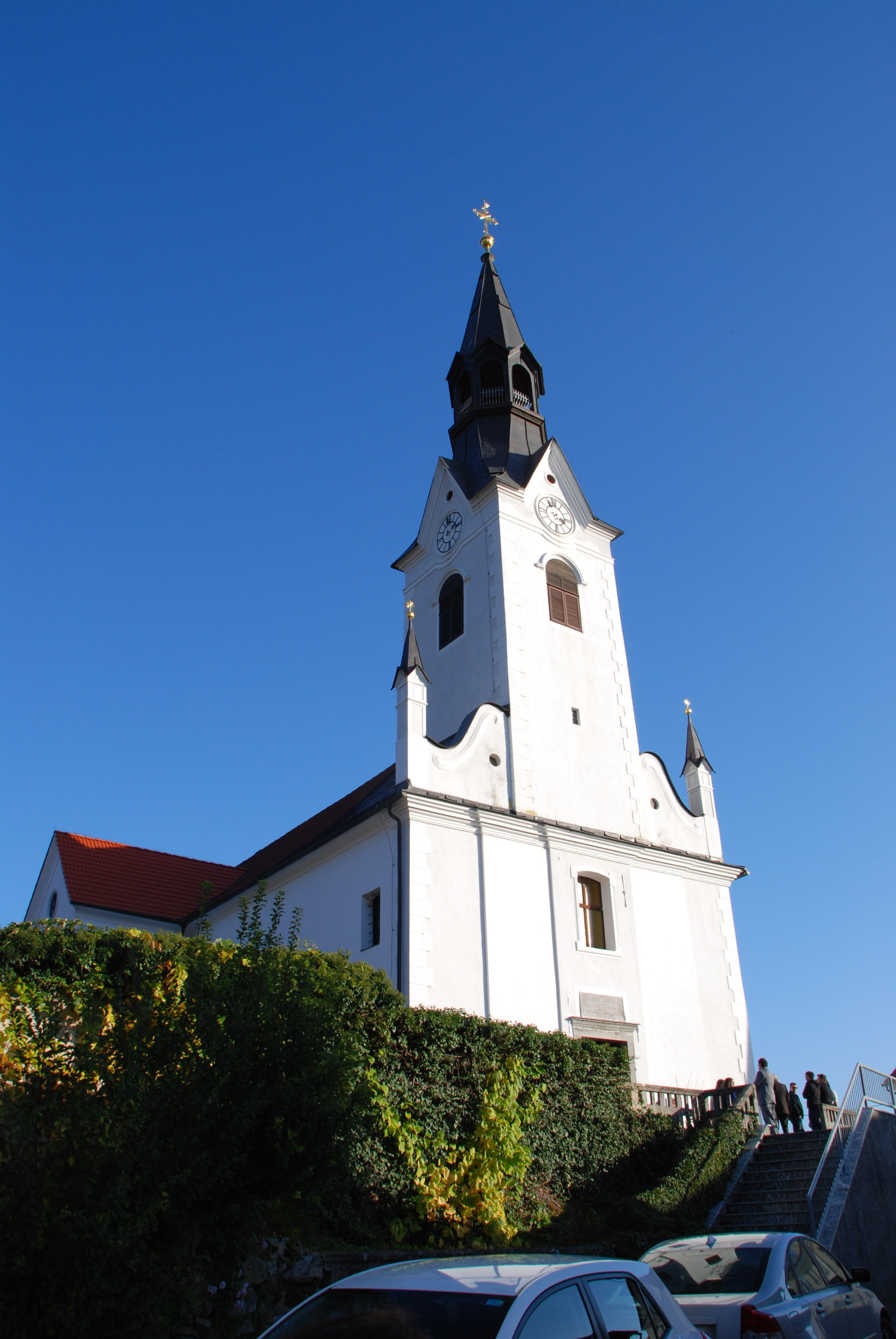
Exaltation of the Holy Cross Parish Church in Gabrovka

The local parish church is dedicated to the Exaltation of the Cross and belongs to the Roman Catholic Diocese of Novo Mesto. It was built in the late 18th century and extended in 1913.

== Notable people ==
Notable people that were born or lived in Gabrovka include:

- Jože Borštnar (a.k.a. Gabrovčan) (1915–1998), Slovene Partisan and people's hero of Yugoslavia
- Ciril Jeglič (1897–1988), technical writer and horticultural expert
- Marko Marin (1930–2015), theater director, art historian, professor, and restoration expert
- Franc Miglič (1855–1925), musician and composer
- Anton Petje (1932–2023), actor who received two Borštnik Ring Awards for his performances
