= Laze =

Laze may refer to:

== Science ==
- Laze (geology), derived from "lava and haze", refers to steam clouds which result from volcanic lava flows entering cold oceans and producing a mixture of hydrochloric acid and volcanic glass particles.

== Places ==
=== Bosnia and Herzegovina ===
- Laze, Bosnia and Herzegovina, a settlement in the Municipality of Rogatica

=== Croatia ===
- Laze, Croatia, a village near Staro Petrovo Selo, Brod-Posavina County
- Srijemske Laze, a village near Stari Jankovci, Vukovar-Srijem County

=== Slovenia ===
- Gornje Laze, a settlement in the Municipality of Semič
- Gradiške Laze, a settlement in the Municipality of Šmartno pri Litiji
- Jablaniške Laze, a settlement in the Municipality of Šmartni pri Litiji
- Laze, Brežice, a settlement in the Municipality of Brežice
- Laze, Gorenja Vas–Poljane, a settlement in the Municipality of Gorenja Vas–Poljane
- Laze, Logatec, a settlement in the Municipality of Logatec
- Laze (Ljubljana), a former settlement in the Urban Municipality of Ljubljana
- Laze nad Krko, a settlement in the Municipality of Ivančna Gorica
- Laze, Novo Mesto, a settlement in the Municipality of Novo Mesto
- Laze pri Borovnici, a settlement in the Municipality of Borovnica
- Laze pri Boštanju, a settlement in the Municipality of Sevnica
- Laze pri Dolskem, a settlement in the Municipality of Dol pri Ljubljani
- Laze pri Domžalah, a settlement in the Municipality of Domžale
- Laze pri Dramljah, a settlement in the Municipality of Šentjur
- Laze pri Gobniku, a settlement in the Municipality of Litija
- Laze pri Gorenjem Jezeru, a settlement in the Municipality of Cerknica
- Laze pri Kostelu, a settlement in the Municipality of Kostel
- Laze pri Oneku, a settlement in the Municipality of Kočevje
- Laze pri Predgradu, a settlement in the Municipality of Kočevje
- Laze pri Vačah, a settlement in the Municipality of Litija
- Laze v Tuhinju, a settlement in the Municipality of Kamnik
- Laze, Velenje, a settlement in the Municipality of Velenje
- Laze, Velike Lašče, a settlement in the Municipality of Velike Lašče
- Spodnje Laze, a settlement in the Municipality of Gorje
- Zgornje Laze, a settlement in the Municipality of Gorje

== See also ==
- Laz people or Lazes, an ethnic group native to the eastern Black Sea coast of Turkey
- Lase (disambiguation)
- Lace (disambiguation)
- Lazi (disambiguation)
