= Podmilj, Litija =

Podmilj
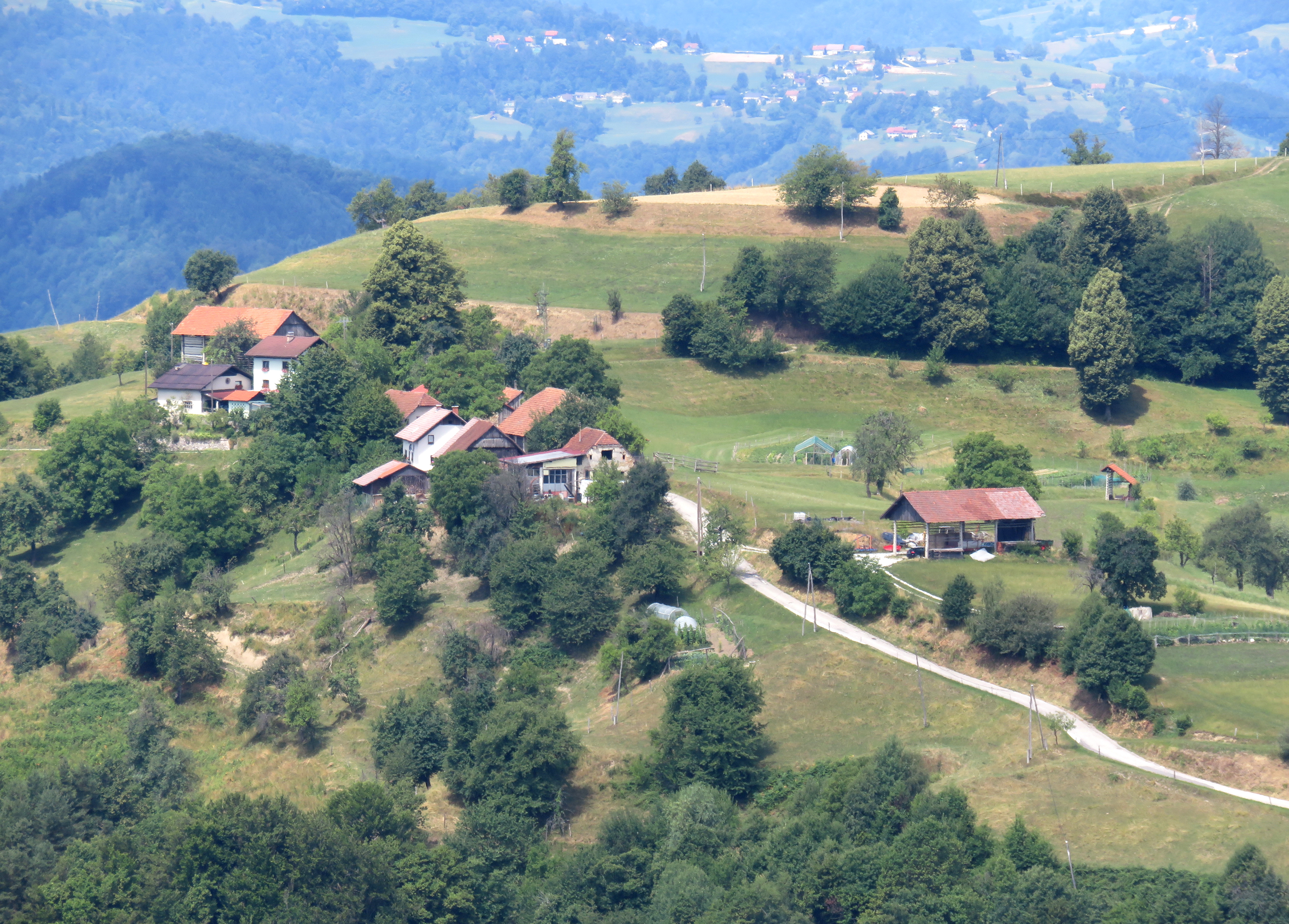

- Location in Slovenia
- Coordinates: 46°3′30″N 14°54′21″E
- Country: Slovenia
- Traditional region: Lower Carniola
- Statistical region: Central Sava
- Municipality: Litija
- Elevation: 650 m (2,130 ft)

Podmilj (pronounced [pɔdˈmiːl], in older sources Podmil) is a former settlement in the Municipality of Litija in central Slovenia. It is now part of the village of Mamolj. The area is part of the traditional region of Lower Carniola and is now included with the rest of the municipality in the Central Sava Statistical Region.

== Geography ==
Podmilj stands in the southwestern part of Mamolj, along the road to Gradiške Laze.

== History ==
Podmilj had a population of 26 living in four houses in 1900. Podmilj was annexed by Mamolj in 1952, ending its existence as a separate settlement.
