= Čebelnik =

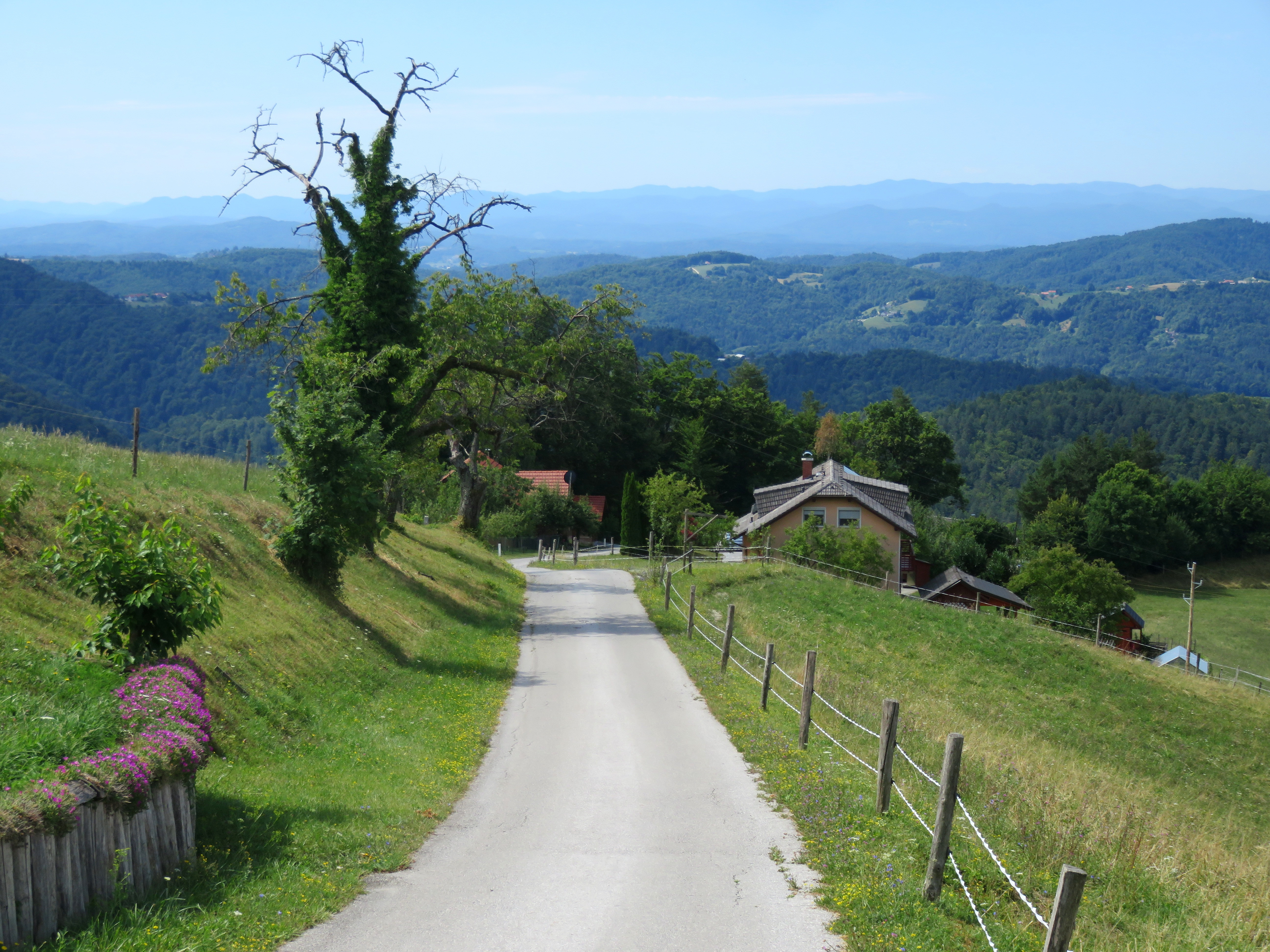

- Location in Slovenia
- Coordinates: 46°3′24″N 14°54′03″E
- Country: Slovenia
- Traditional region: Lower Carniola
- Statistical region: Central Sava
- Municipality: Litija
- Elevation: 616 m (2,021 ft)

Čebelnik (pronounced [tʃɛˈbeːu̯nik], sometimes Čebeljnik) is a former settlement in the Municipality of Litija in central Slovenia. It is now part of the village of Mamolj. The area is part of the traditional region of Lower Carniola and is now included with the rest of the municipality in the Central Sava Statistical Region.

== Geography ==
Čebelnik stands in the southwesternmost part of Mamolj, along the road to Gradiške Laze.

== History ==
Čebelnik had a population of 72 living in 15 houses in 1900. Čebelnik was annexed by Mamolj in 1952, ending its existence as a separate settlement.
