= Krnica =

Krnica may refer to:

- Krnica, Gorje, a settlement in Upper Carniola, Slovenia
- Krnica, Koper, a small settlement in Littoral, Slovenia
- Krnica, Luče, a dispersed settlement in Styria, Slovenia
- Krnica, Marčana, a village in Istria, Croatia
