= Laze pri Boštanju =

- Location in Slovenia
- Coordinates: 45°59′13.08″N 15°16′41.36″E
- Country: Slovenia
- Traditional region: Lower Carniola
- Statistical region: Lower Sava
- Municipality: Sevnica

Area
  - Total: 4.79 km^{2} (1.85 sq mi)
- Elevation: 565.8 m (1,856 ft)

Population (2002)
  - Total: 34

Laze pri Boštanju (pronounced [ˈlaːzɛ pɾi bɔˈʃtaːnju]) is a dispersed settlement in the hills south of Boštanj in the Municipality of Sevnica in central Slovenia. The area is part of the historical region of Lower Carniola. The municipality is now included in the Lower Sava Statistical Region. It includes the hamlets of Rekštanj (German: Ruckenstein) and Zapuže.

== Name ==
The name of the settlement was changed from Laze to Laze pri Boštanju (literally, 'Laze near Boštanj') in 1955 to differentiate it from other settlements with the same name. The name Laze is derived from the common noun laz 'cleared area in or next to a forest overgrown with grass'. This was originally a masculine plural noun (preserved in some other toponyms such as Dolenji Lazi), but it became a feminine plural noun like similar toponyms (e.g., Laze pri Dolskem, Zgornje Laže, etc.) due to the ambiguous accusative ending in -e.

== Rekštanj Castle ==
The ruins of Rekštanj Castle (German: Ruckenstein), a medieval castle first mentioned in written documents dating to 1392 and abandoned in the 17th century, lie north of the settlement on a hill above the right bank of the Mirna River.
