= Grabče =

- Location in Slovenia
- Coordinates: 46°22′53.44″N 14°3′37.68″E
- Country: Slovenia
- Traditional Region: Upper Carniola
- Statistical region: Upper Carniola
- Municipality: Gorje
- Elevation: 605.8 m (1,988 ft)

Population (2020)
  - Total: 79

Grabče (pronounced [ˈɡɾaːptʃɛ]) is a settlement next to Zgornje Gorje in the Municipality of Gorje in the Upper Carniola region of Slovenia.
