= Zatrnik =

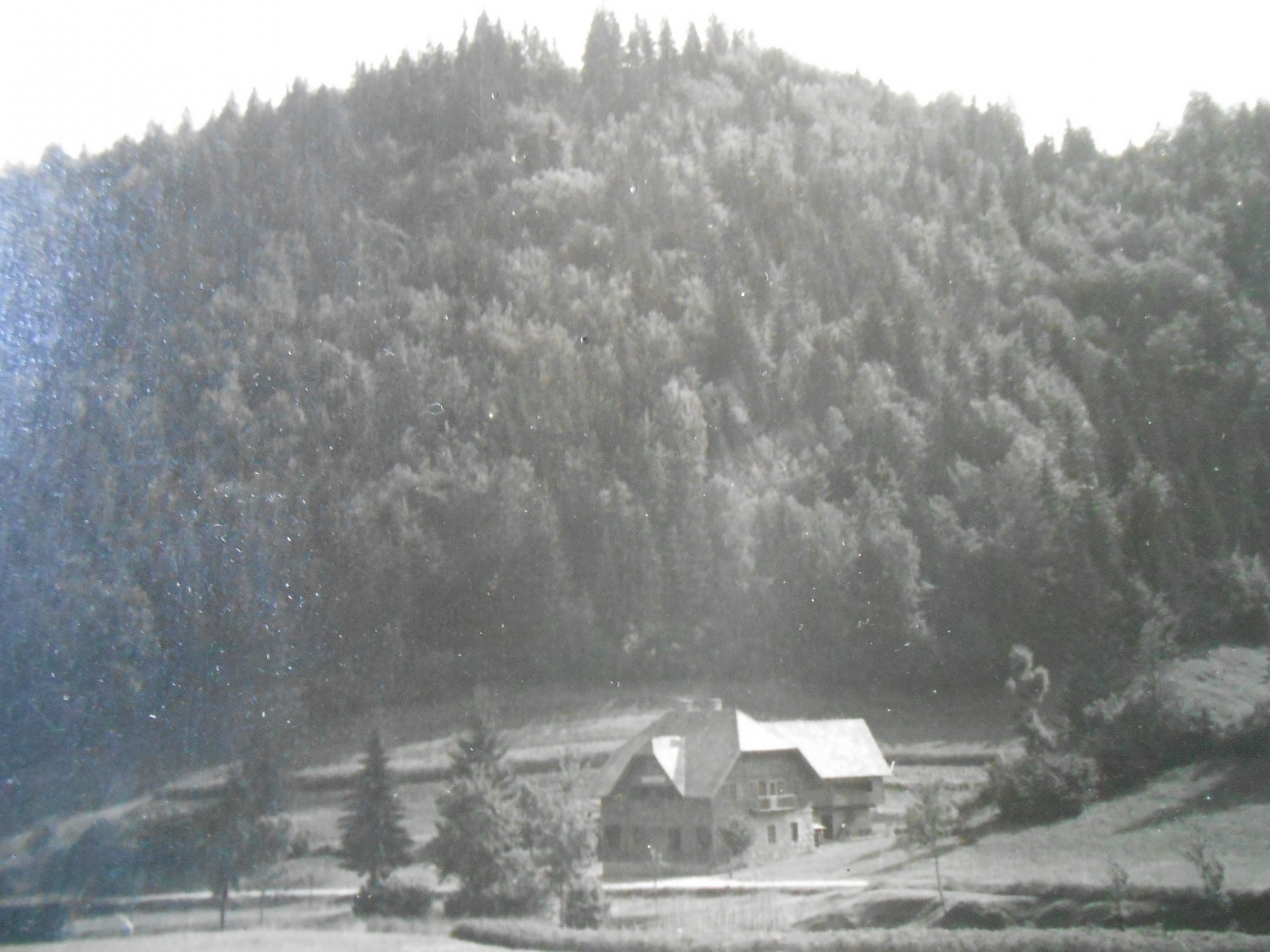
- Postcard of Zatrnik, 1960

- Location in Slovenia
- Coordinates: 46°22′13″N 14°1′54″E
- Country: Slovenia
- Traditional Region: Upper Carniola
- Statistical region: Upper Carniola
- Municipality: Gorje
- Elevation: 900 m (3,000 ft)

Population (2025)
  - Total: 39

Zatrnik (pronounced [ˈzaːtəɾnik] or [zatəɾˈniːk], in older sources Zaternik) is a settlement in the Municipality of Gorje in the Upper Carniola region of Slovenia.

== Name ==
Zatrnik was recorded in historical sources as Za Ternikom in 1763–1787. The name is a fused prepositional phrase that has lost inflection, derived from za trnikom 'behind the thorny thicket'.

== History ==
Zatrnik had a population of 18 (in four houses) in 1880 and 23 (in four houses) in 1900. Zatrnik was deemed annexed by Krnica in 1952, ending any existence it had as a separate settlement. Zatrnik became a separate settlement in 2020, when it was separated from Krnica.
