= Spodnji Mamolj =

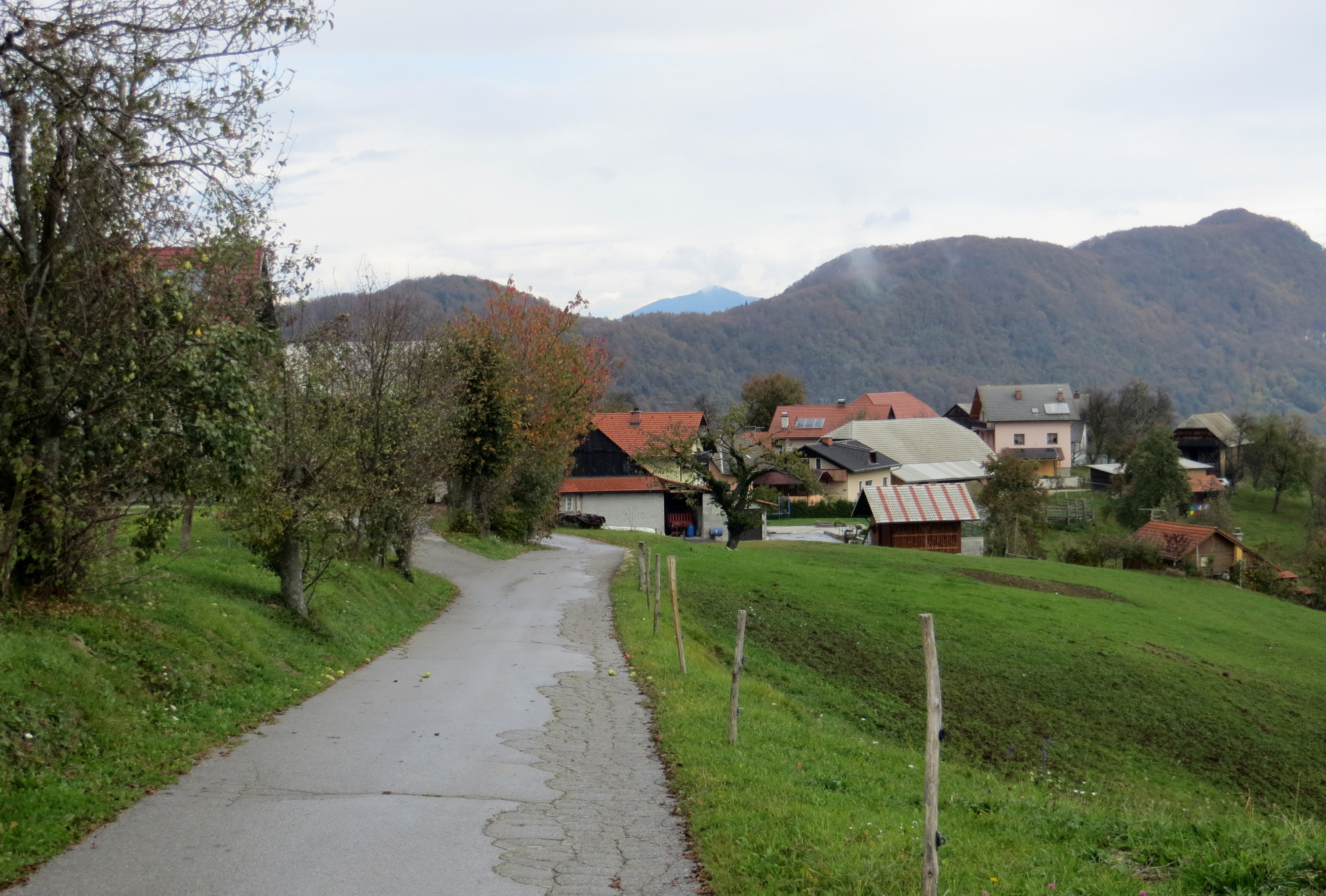

- Location in Slovenia
- Coordinates: 46°3′56″N 14°55′24″E
- Country: Slovenia
- Traditional region: Lower Carniola
- Statistical region: Central Sava
- Municipality: Litija
- Elevation: 608 m (1,995 ft)

Spodnji Mamolj (pronounced [ˈspoːdnji ˈmaːmɔl], in older sources Dolenji Mamolj, German: Untermamol) is a former settlement in the Municipality of Litija in central Slovenia. It is now part of the village of Mamolj. The area is part of the traditional region of Lower Carniola and is now included with the rest of the municipality in the Central Sava Statistical Region.

== Geography ==
Spodnji Mamolj stands in the southeastern part of Mamolj, on the road to Gradiške Laze.

== Name ==
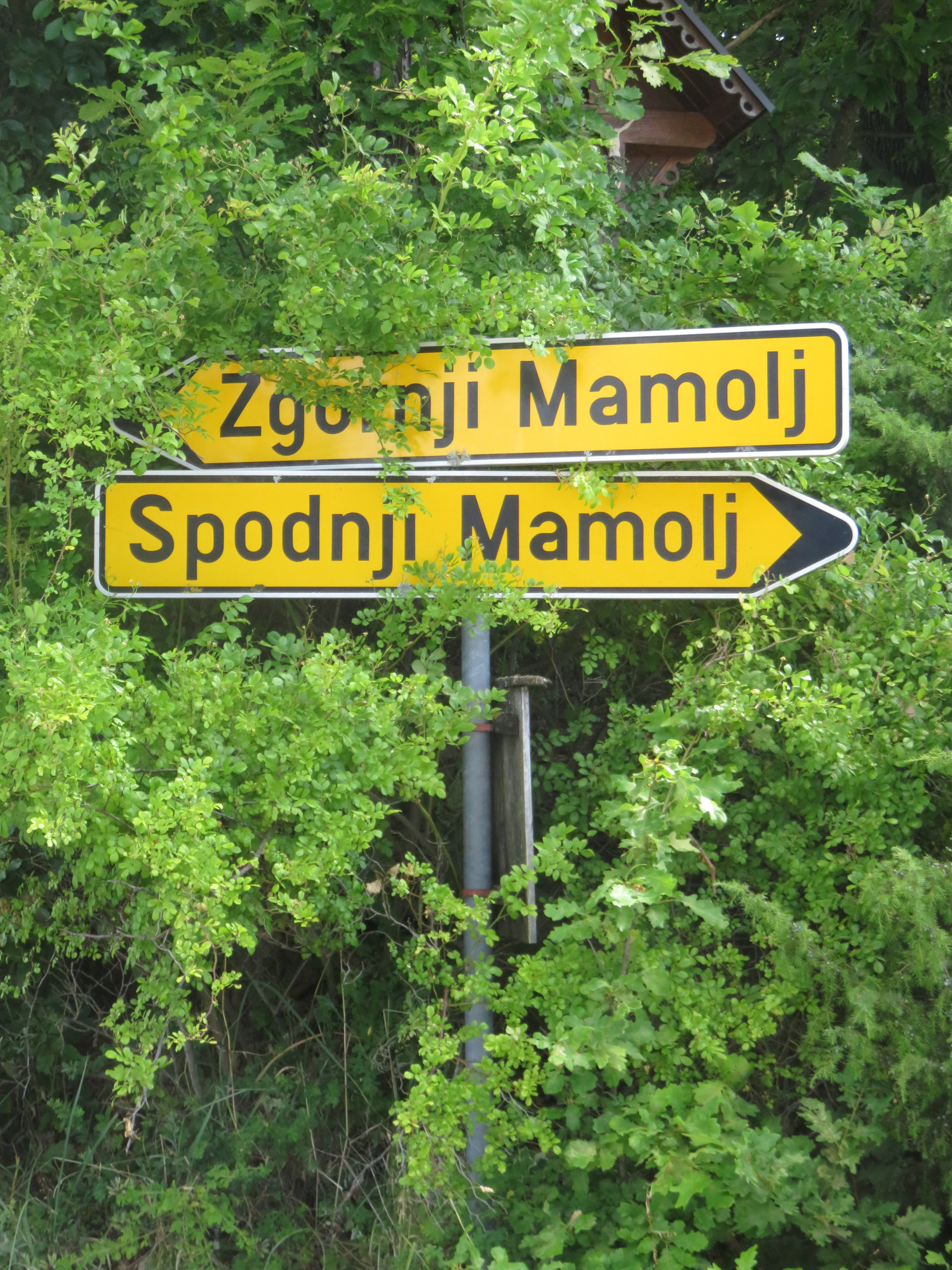
Sign for Zgornji Mamolj

The name Spodnji Mamolj literally means 'lower Mamolj'. It is paired with neighboring Zgornji Mamolj (literally, 'upper Mamolj'), which stands about 67 meters (220 ft) higher in elevation. The settlement was known as Untermamol in German.

== History ==
Spodnji Mamolj had a population of 40 living in five houses in 1900. Spodnji Mamolj was annexed by Mamolj in 1953, ending its existence as a separate settlement.
