= Zgornji Mamolj =

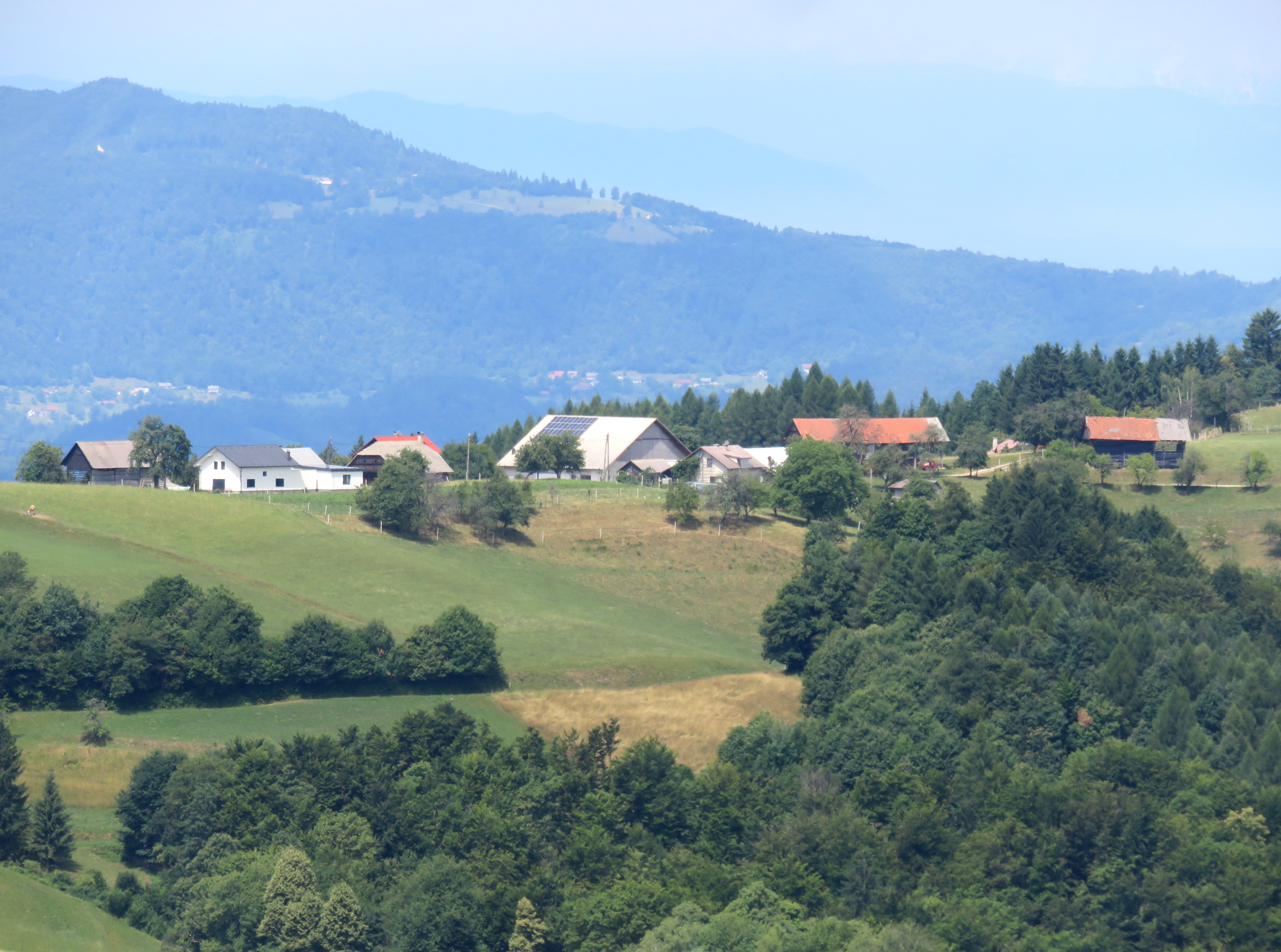

- Location in Slovenia
- Coordinates: 46°3′42″N 14°54′7″E
- Country: Slovenia
- Traditional region: Lower Carniola
- Statistical region: Central Sava
- Municipality: Litija
- Elevation: 675 m (2,215 ft)

Zgornji Mamolj (pronounced [ˈzɡoːɾnji ˈmaːmɔl], in older sources Gorenji Mamolj, German: Obermamol) is a former settlement in the Municipality of Litija in central Slovenia. It is now part of the village of Mamolj. The area is part of the traditional region of Lower Carniola and is now included with the rest of the municipality in the Central Sava Statistical Region.

== Geography ==
Zgornji Mamolj stands in the western part of Mamolj, on a side road off of the main road to Gradiške Laze.

== Name ==
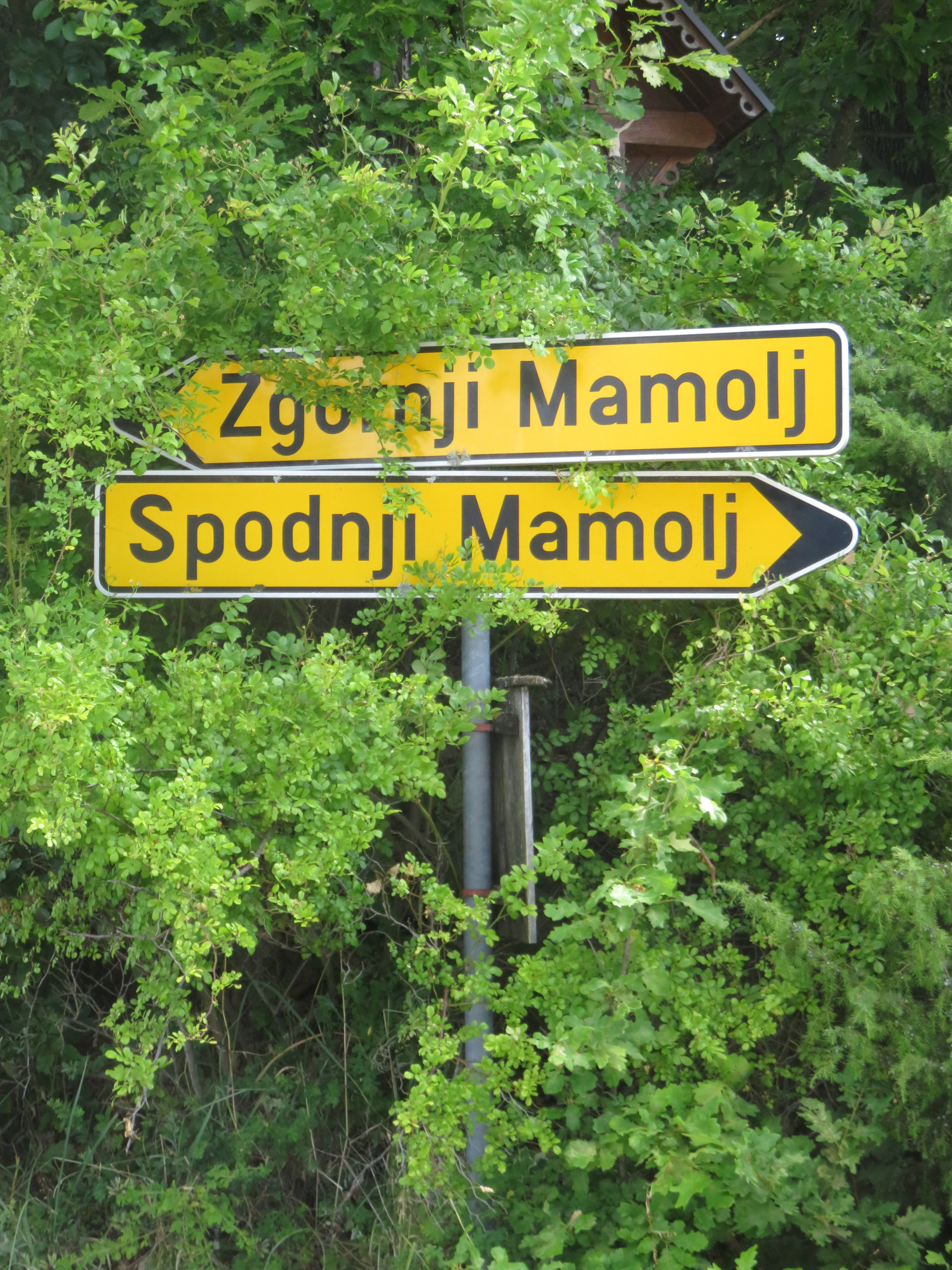
Sign for Zgornji Mamolj

The name Zgornji Mamolj literally means 'upper Mamolj'. It is paired with neighboring Spodnji Mamolj (literally, 'lower Mamolj'), which stands about 67 meters (220 ft) lower in elevation. The settlement was known as Obermamol in German.

== History ==
Zgornji Mamolj had a population of 50 living in nine houses in 1900. Zgornji Mamolj was annexed by Mamolj in 1953, ending its existence as a separate settlement.
