= Podhom =

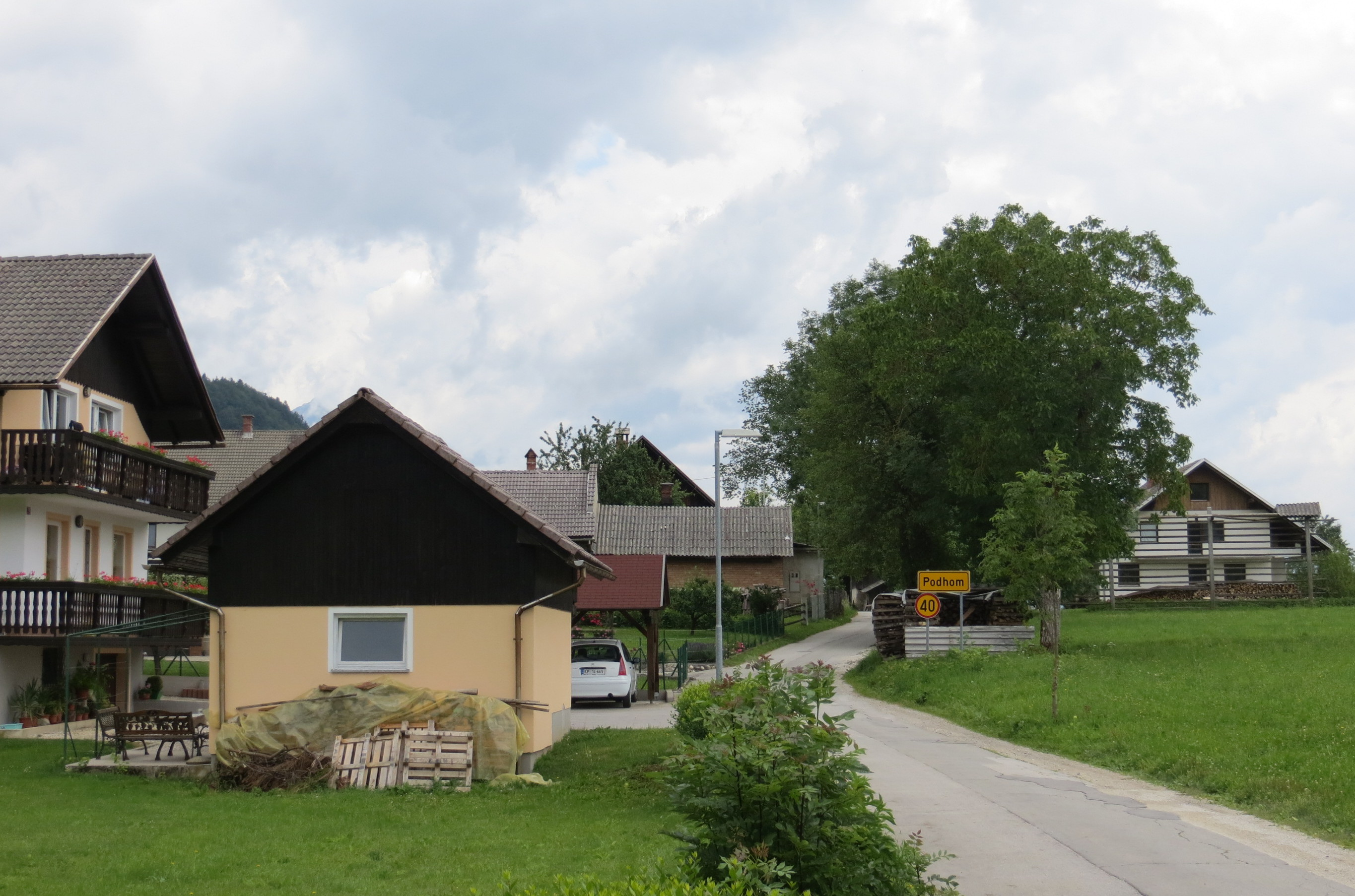

- Location in Slovenia
- Coordinates: 46°23′18″N 14°5′30.53″E
- Country: Slovenia
- Traditional Region: Upper Carniola
- Statistical region: Upper Carniola
- Municipality: Gorje
- Elevation: 562.1 m (1,844 ft)

Population (2020)
  - Total: 329

Podhom (pronounced [ˈpoːtxɔm]) is a settlement in the Municipality of Gorje in the Upper Carniola region of Slovenia. In addition to the main settlement, it also consists of the hamlets of Spodnji Graben, Gabrce, Vintgar, and Vršce to the west.

== Name ==
The name Podhom is a fused prepositional phrase that has lost its case ending, from pod 'below' + Hom 'Hom Hill'. Hom Hill (834 m) stands north of Podhom. The name Podhom therefore literally means 'below Hom Hill'. Podhom was known as Buchheim in German in the past.

== Notable people ==
Notable people that were born or lived in Podhom include:

- Albin Belar (1864–1939), seismologist
- Andrej Žumer (1847–1903), teacher and editor
