= Višelnica =

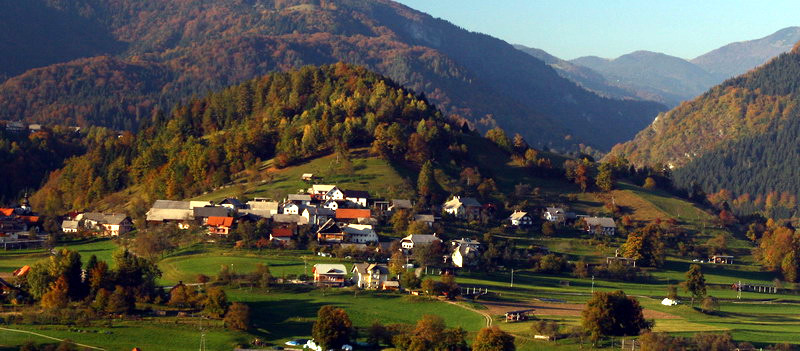

- Location in Slovenia
- Coordinates: 46°22′59.58″N 14°4′15.02″E
- Country: Slovenia
- Traditional Region: Upper Carniola
- Statistical region: Upper Carniola
- Municipality: Gorje
- Elevation: 642.6 m (2,108 ft)

Population (2020)
  - Total: 71

Višelnica (pronounced [ʋiˈʃeːu̯nitsa]) is a settlement in the Municipality of Gorje in the Upper Carniola region of Slovenia.
