= Mevkuž =

- Location in Slovenia
- Coordinates: 46°23′4.05″N 14°4′6.99″E
- Country: Slovenia
- Traditional Region: Upper Carniola
- Statistical region: Upper Carniola
- Municipality: Gorje
- Elevation: 629.8 m (2,066 ft)

Population (2020)
  - Total: 76

Mevkuž (pronounced [ˈmeːu̯kuʃ]) is a settlement in the Municipality of Gorje in the Upper Carniola region of Slovenia.

The local church is dedicated to Saint Nicholas.
