= Poljšica pri Gorjah =

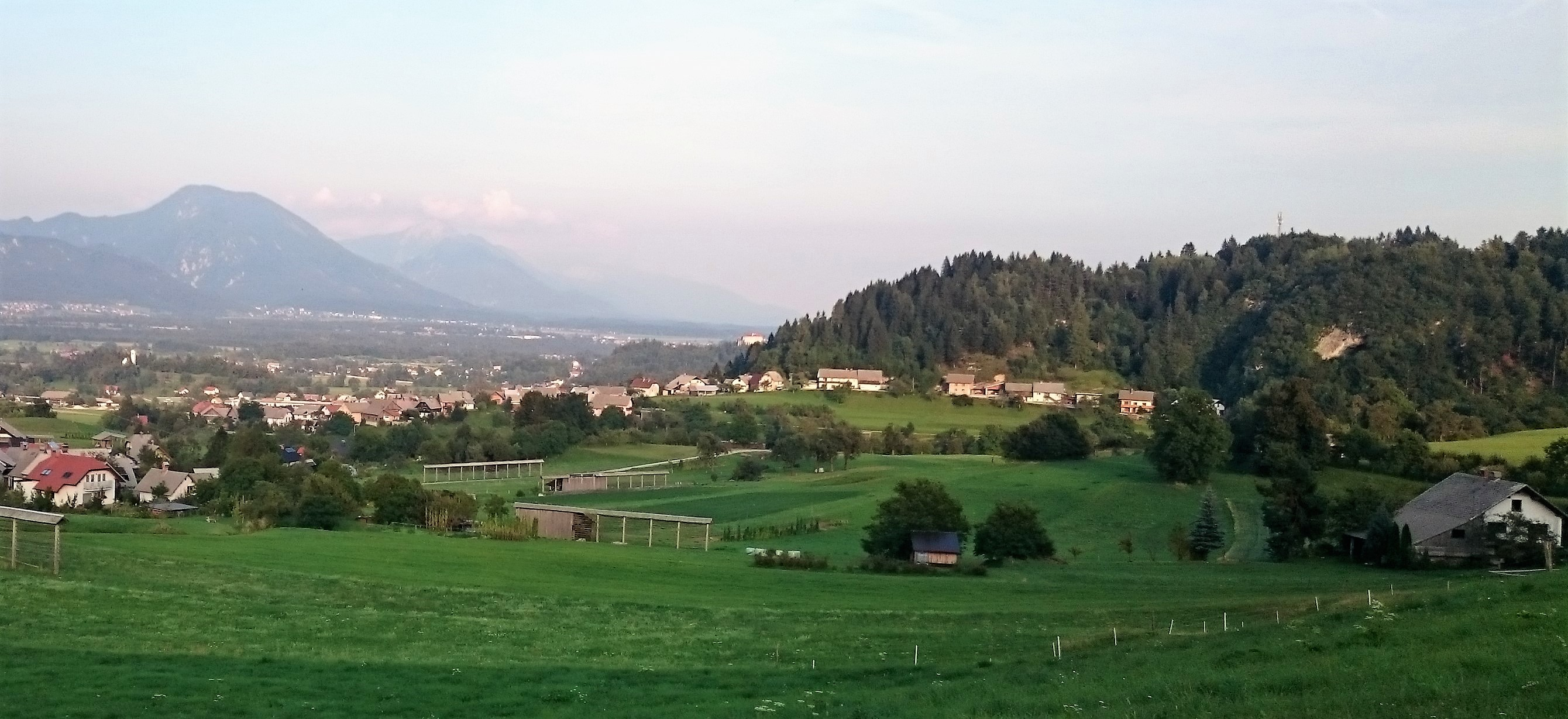

- Location in Slovenia
- Coordinates: 46°22′40.88″N 14°4′26.1″E
- Country: Slovenia
- Traditional Region: Upper Carniola
- Statistical region: Upper Carniola
- Municipality: Gorje
- Elevation: 578.6 m (1,898 ft)

Population (2020)
  - Total: 238

Poljšica pri Gorjah (pronounced [pɔlˈʃiːtsa pɾi ˈɡɔːɾjax]) is a settlement in the Municipality of Gorje in the Upper Carniola region of Slovenia.

== Name ==
The name of the settlement was changed from Poljšica to Poljšica pri Gorjah in 1953.
