= Lazi =

Lazi may refer to:

- the Laz(i) people, which gave its name to Lazica region (Ancient Colchis) in present Georgia
- Lazi, Siquijor, municipality in the Philippines
- Lazi County, county in Tibet
- Lazi, Croatia, a village near Čabar
- Lazi Krapinski, a village near Krapina, Croatia
- Lázi, a Hungarian village
- Lazi, Montenegro, a village in Berane Municipality
- Stari Lazi, a village near Brod Moravice, Croatia
- Novi Lazi, Slovenia, a village in Kočevje
- Novi Lazi, Croatia, a village near Brod Moravice

== See also ==
- Laze (disambiguation)
