= Spodnje Gorje =

- Location in Slovenia
- Coordinates: 46°22′51.11″N 14°4′25.11″E
- Country: Slovenia
- Traditional Region: Upper Carniola
- Statistical region: Upper Carniola
- Municipality: Gorje
- Elevation: 562.2 m (1,844 ft)

Population (2020)
  - Total: 938

Spodnje Gorje (pronounced [ˈspoːdnjɛ ˈɡɔːɾjɛ]) is the largest settlement in the Municipality of Gorje in the Upper Carniola region of Slovenia. It includes the hamlets of Zgornji Graben, Furtuna, and Poljane on the Mežakla Plateau.

== Name ==
The name Spodnje Gorje literally means 'lower Gorje', distinguishing the settlement from neighboring Zgornje Gorje (literally, 'upper Gorje'). The two settlements were attested in Latin in 1050–65 as in loco qui dicitur Summitas campi and in loco qui dicitur z Obinentigemo uelde (both 'in the place called top of the field'). The name Gorje is derived from the plural demonym *Gorjane 'mountain residents', derived from the common noun gora 'mountain'.

== History ==
Early settlement of the area is attested by several graves from the 11th century behind the house at the Turk farm. During the Second World War, the Partisans established a base in the hamlet of Poljane in the summer of 1941.

=== Mass graves ===
Spodnje Gorje is the site of four known mass graves in Slovenia of civilians and Nazi German soldiers and nurses killed after the conclusion of the Second World War by the Red Army and the Yugoslav Communist-led National Liberation Army. Three of the graves are in the woods northwest of the settlement. The Meadow 1 and 2 mass graves (Slovene: Grobišče Na trati 1, 2) contain the remains of two truckloads of Slovene civilians of Italian heritage from Begunje na Gorenjskem transported to the site and murdered on July 24, 1945. They were buried at three sites. The first site is between the narrow dirt road to the Jožnik Clearing (Jožnikov rovt) and the edge of the woods. The second site is north of the main gravel road, at the north corner of a wooden shed in a fenced meadow. The third location has not been identified. The Meadow Shaft 1 Mass Grave (Grobišče Brezno na trati 1), also known as the Beton Cave Mass Grave (Grobišče Betonova jama), lies a few meters below the main gravel road and is covered with trash. It is a 15-meter (49 ft) shaft containing the remains of three prisoners of war captured from the Wehrmacht of Nazi Germany. The Gravel Pit Mass Grave (Grobišče v peskokopu), also known as the Špan Gravel Pit Mass Grave (Grobišče Španov peskokop), lies north of the settlement to the right of the road to Kočna and contains the remains about 20 German nurses murdered after the war.

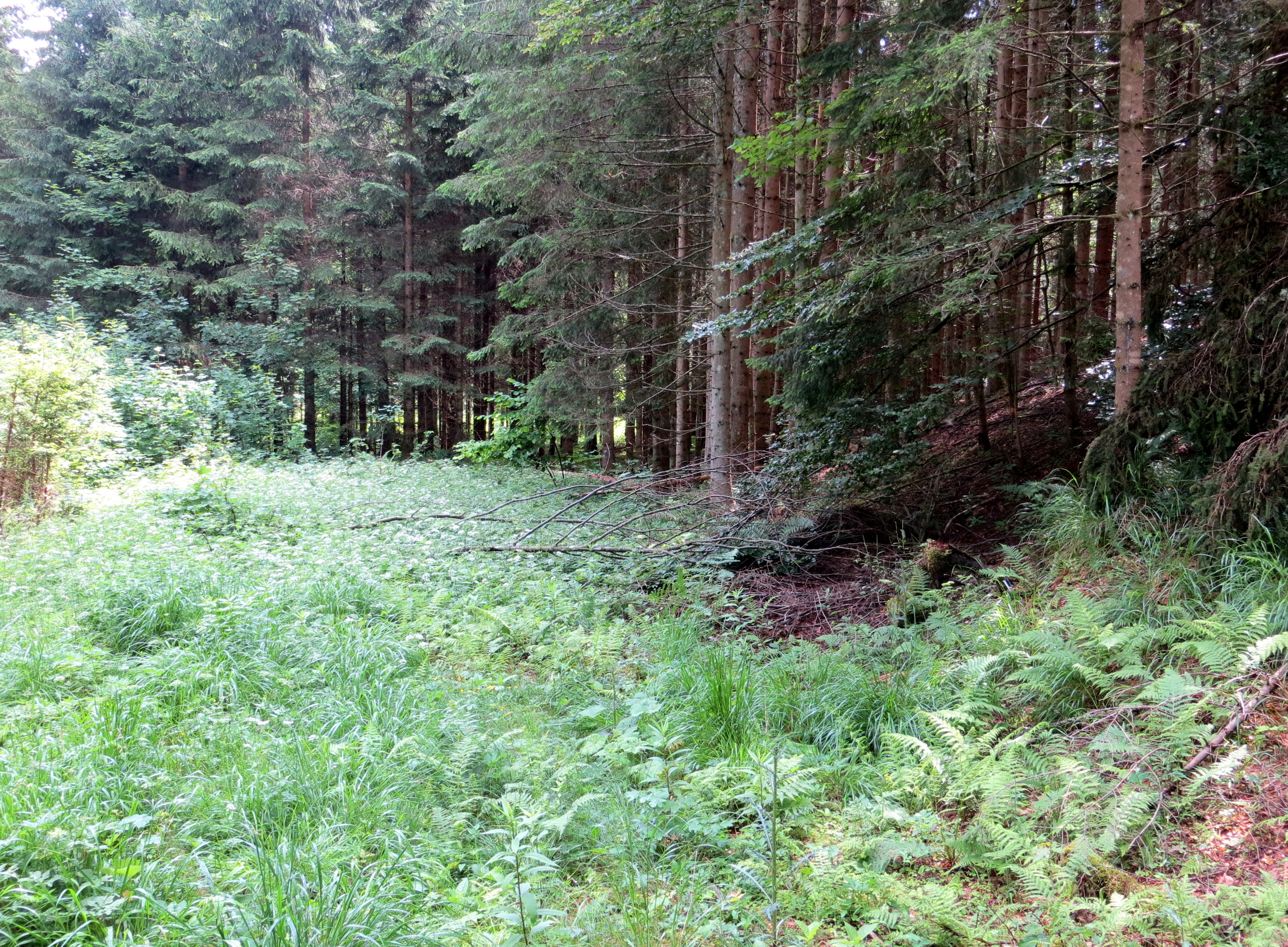
Meadow 1 Mass Grave

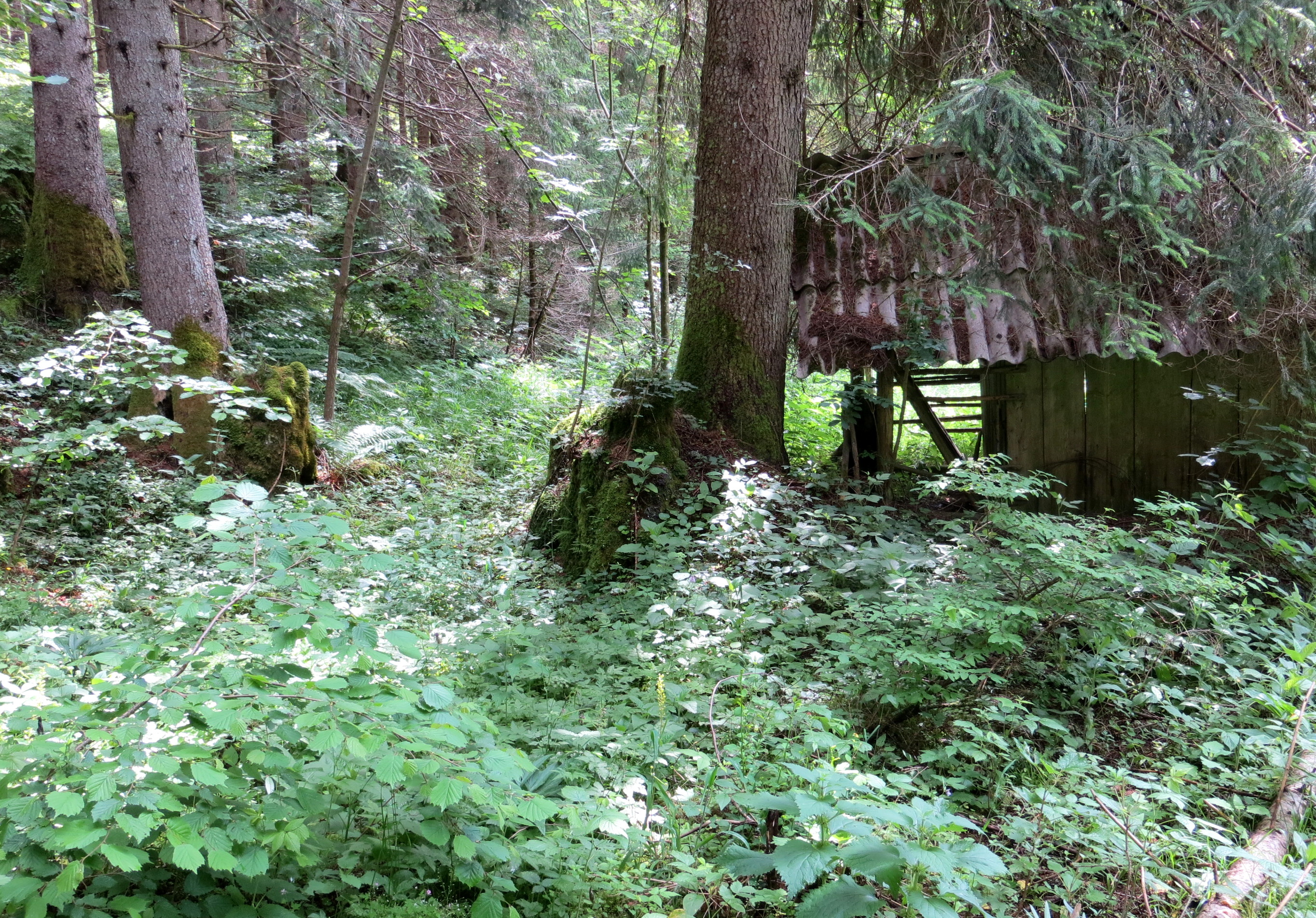
Meadow 2 Mass Grave

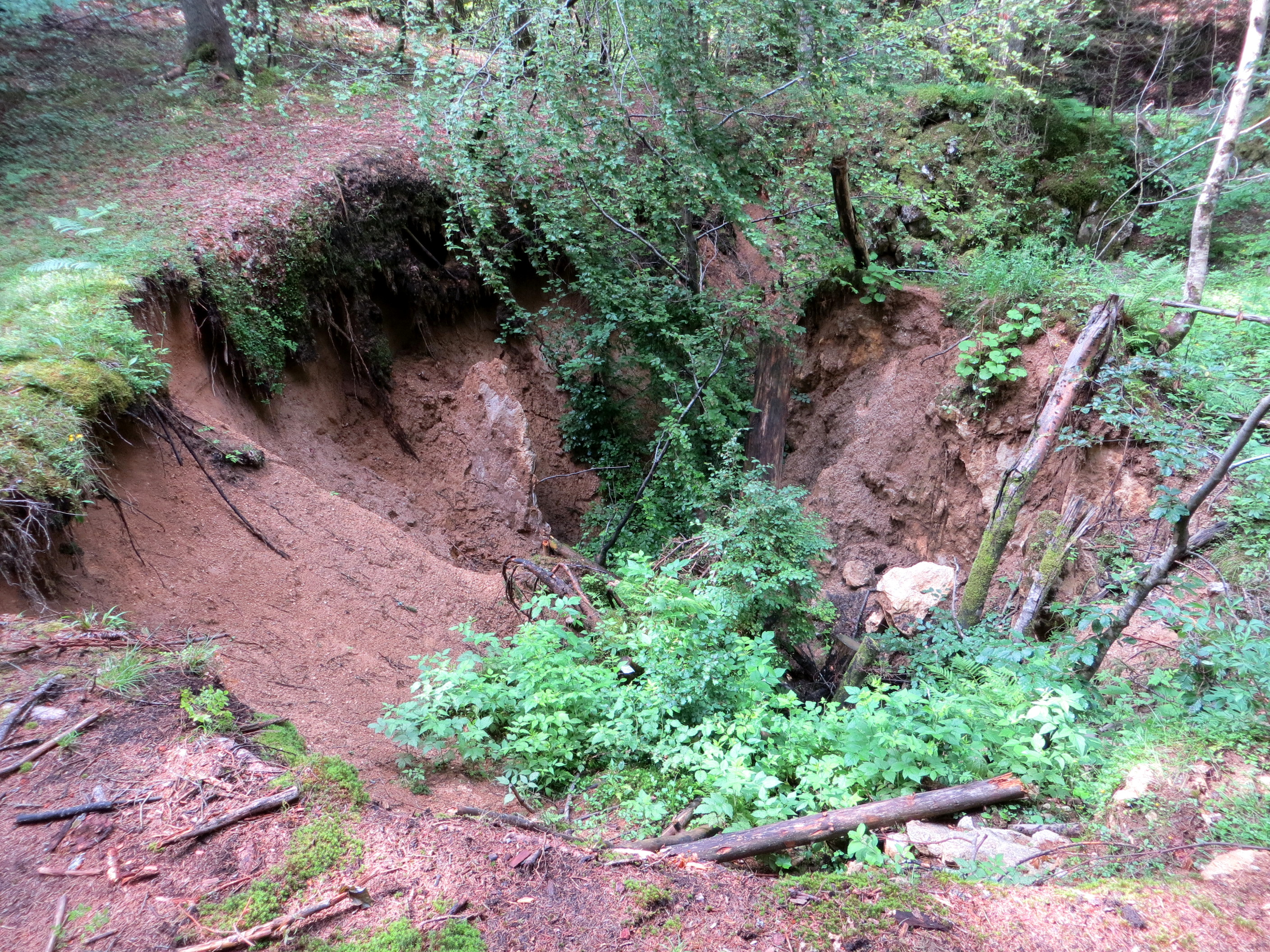
Meadow Shaft 1 Mass Grave

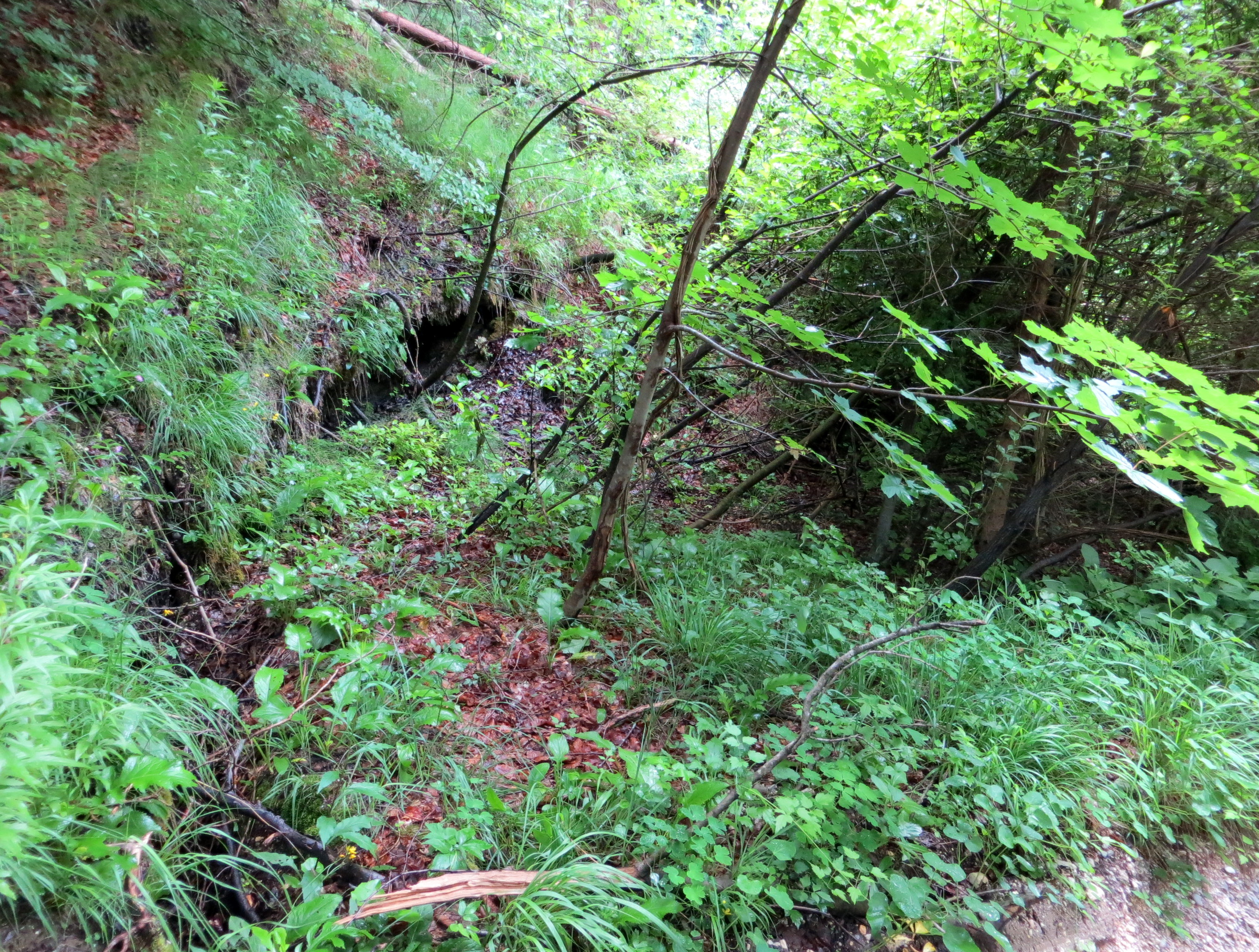
Gravel Pit Mass Grave

== Church ==
The church in the village is dedicated to Saint Oswald. It dates from 1629. There is a painting of Saint Oswald on the outside wall of the church, and a painting by Janez Potočnik (1749–1834) inside the church.

== Notable people ==
Notable people from Spodnje Gorje include:

- Andrej Žvan, a.k.a. "Boris" (1915–1945), Slovene Partisan and People's Hero of Yugoslavia
- Anton Slivnik (1874–1957), technical writer and veterinarian
