= Mamolj =

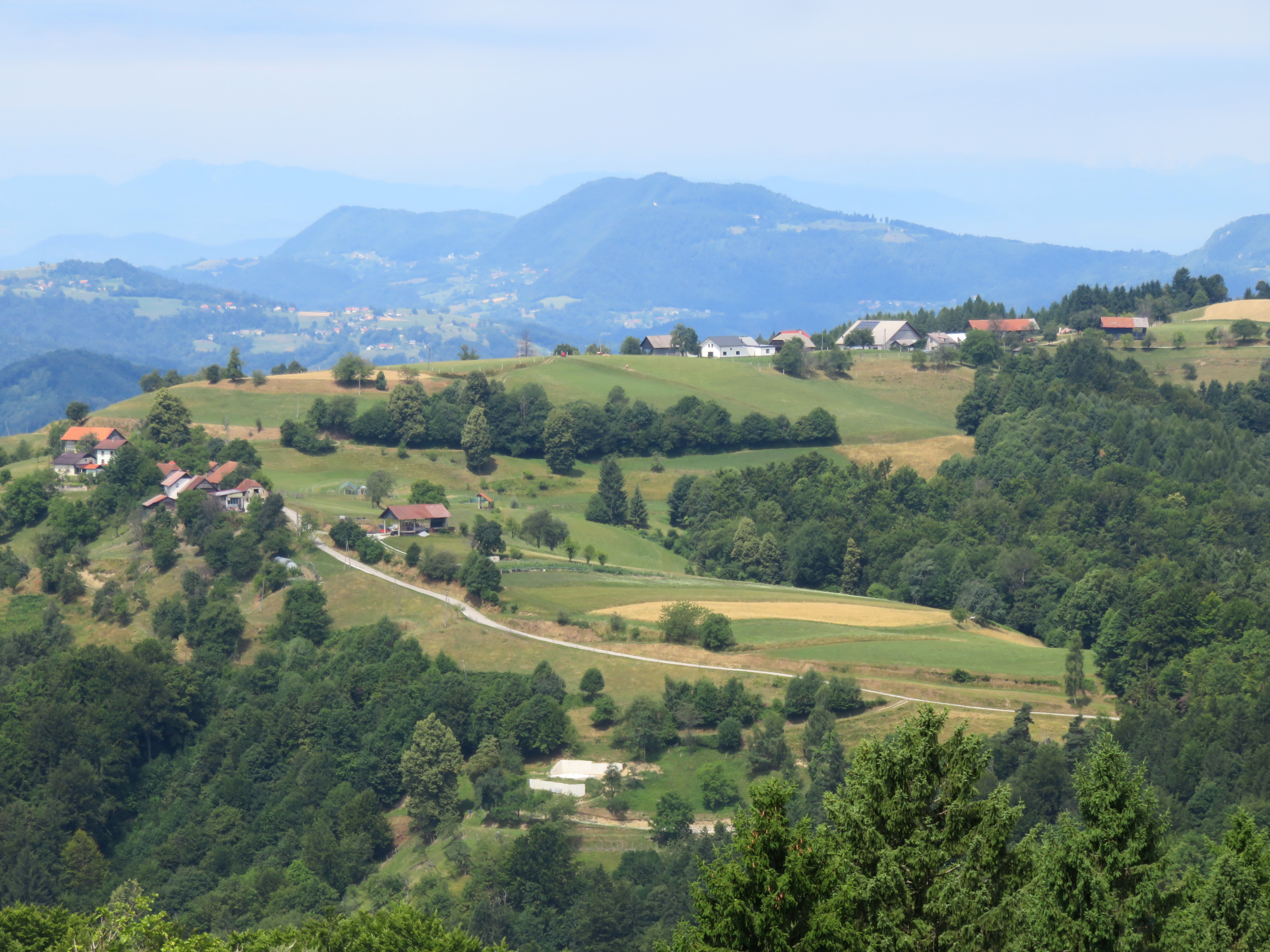

- Location in Slovenia
- Coordinates: 46°3′55.06″N 14°55′20.32″E
- Country: Slovenia
- Traditional region: Lower Carniola
- Statistical region: Central Slovenia
- Municipality: Litija

Area
  - Total: 5.68 km^{2} (2.19 sq mi)
- Elevation: 608.4 m (1,996 ft)

Population (2002)
  - Total: 112
- Postal code: 1272

Mamolj (pronounced [ˈmaːmɔl]; German: Mamol) is a settlement in the hills east of Litija in central Slovenia. The area is part of the traditional region of Lower Carniola. It is now included with the rest of the municipality in the Central Sava Statistical Region. It includes the hamlets of Spodnji Mamolj, Zgornji Mamolj, Čebelnik, Češek, Podmilj, Resnarica, and Trinkavs.

== Church ==
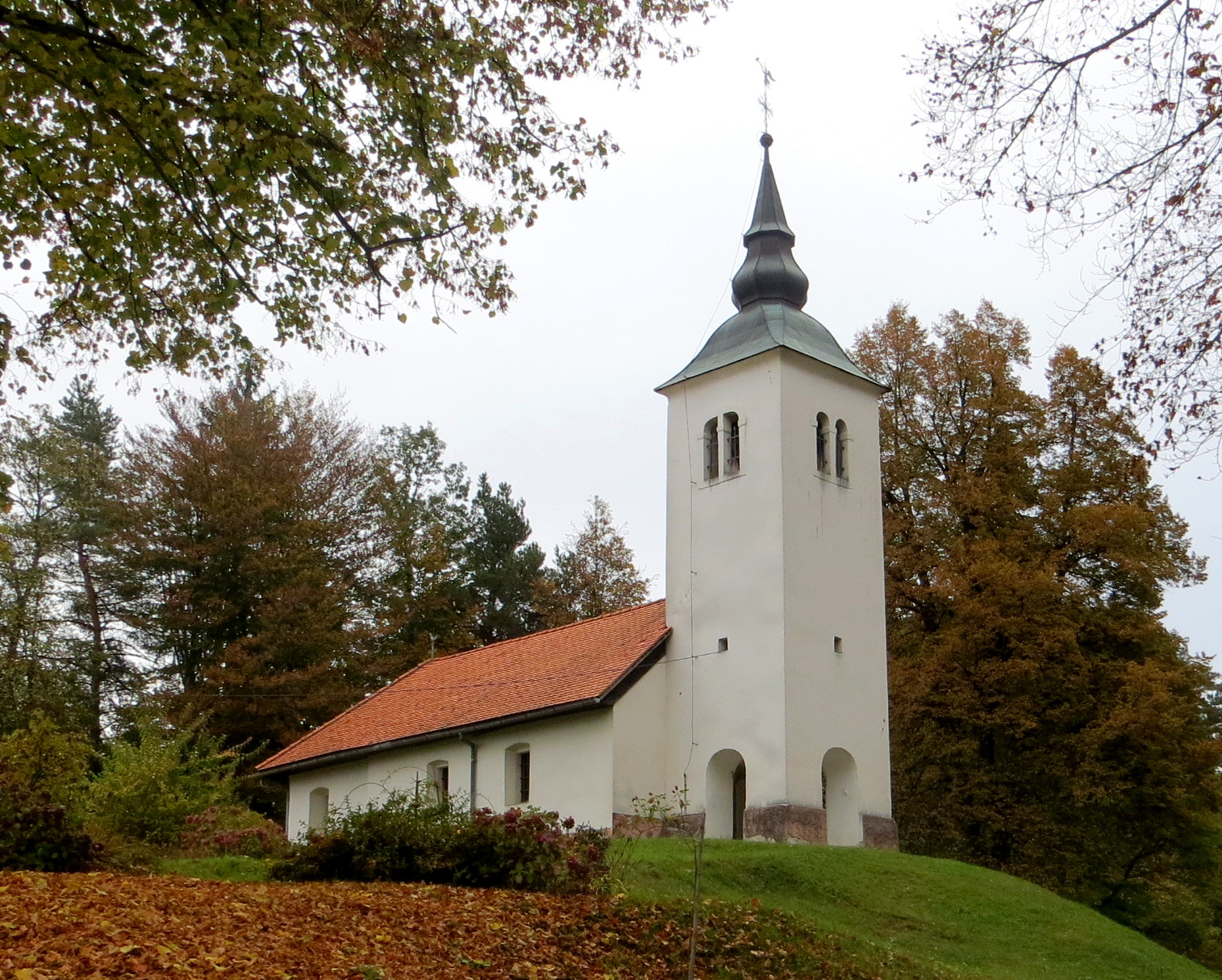
Saint John the Baptist Church

The local church is dedicated to John the Baptist and belongs to the Parish of Polšnik. It was built in the 18th century.
