= Tone Polda =

Slovene writer and poet (1917–1945)

- Born: June 4, 1917; Krnica, Kingdom of Yugoslavia
- Died: June 23, 1945 (aged 28); Mount Mrzlica above Hrastnik
- Occupations: Writer and poet

Tone Polda (a.k.a. Anton Polda, June 4, 1917 – June 23, 1945) was a Slovenian Roman Catholic priest, poet, and writer.

Polda was born in Krnica. After completing his studies in theology in Ljubljana, he was ordained a priest in 1943. In September of the same year, he survived the Partisan siege at Turjak Castle and then became a curate for the Slovene Home Guard. Before the end of the war, he retreated to Carinthia, but he was returned from the camp at Viktring by British forces. He was then imprisoned in the Teharje camp, which he managed to escape from. He was shot while on the run in the forest on Mount Mrzlica above Hrastnik.

Polda contributed poems and short prose to manuscript publications and the anthologies Jutranja zarja, Domače vaje, and Mlada setev, and he also published in the magazines Vrtec, Kres, and Naša zvezda. In his material and expression, he drew from the writings of Fran Saleški Finžgar and Janez Jalen, which is why images from peasant life and stories with a contemporary Christian theme dominate among his sketches and novellas. His selected work was published in 1996 in the volume Moja Krnica.
