= Lase =

Lase may refer to:

- The operation of a laser
- One of the Lases, guardian deities in ancient Roman religion
- Laše, a village in Slovenia

== See also ==
- Laze (disambiguation)
- Lace (disambiguation)
- LASED, Los Angeles Stadium and Entertainment District at Hollywood Park
