= Perniki =

- Location in Slovenia
- Coordinates: 46°23′40.69″N 14°1′36.09″E
- Country: Slovenia
- Traditional Region: Upper Carniola
- Statistical region: Upper Carniola
- Municipality: Gorje
- Elevation: 826.3 m (2,711 ft)

Population (2020)
  - Total: 15

Perniki (pronounced [pɛɾˈniːki]) is a small settlement on the Mežakla Plateau in the Municipality of Gorje in the Upper Carniola region of Slovenia.
