= Gorenji Lazi =

- Location in Slovenia
- Coordinates: 45°46′12″N 14°40′27.03″E
- Country: Slovenia
- Traditional region: Lower Carniola
- Statistical region: Southeast Slovenia
- Municipality: Ribnica

Area
  - Total: 0.84 km^{2} (0.32 sq mi)
- Elevation: 603.2 m (1,979 ft)

Population (2002)
  - Total: 32
- Postal code: 1310

Gorenji Lazi (pronounced [ɡɔˈɾeːnji ˈlaːzi]; German: Obergereuth) is a small settlement in the hills above Žlebič in the Municipality of Ribnica in southern Slovenia. The entire area is part of the traditional region of Lower Carniola and is now included in the Southeast Slovenia Statistical Region.

== Name ==
The name Gorenji Lazi means 'upper clearings', contrasting with nearby Dolenji Lazi (literally, 'lower clearings'), which lies about 100 meters (330 ft) lower in elevation. The name refers to land that was cleared for settlement.
