= Zgornje Gorje =

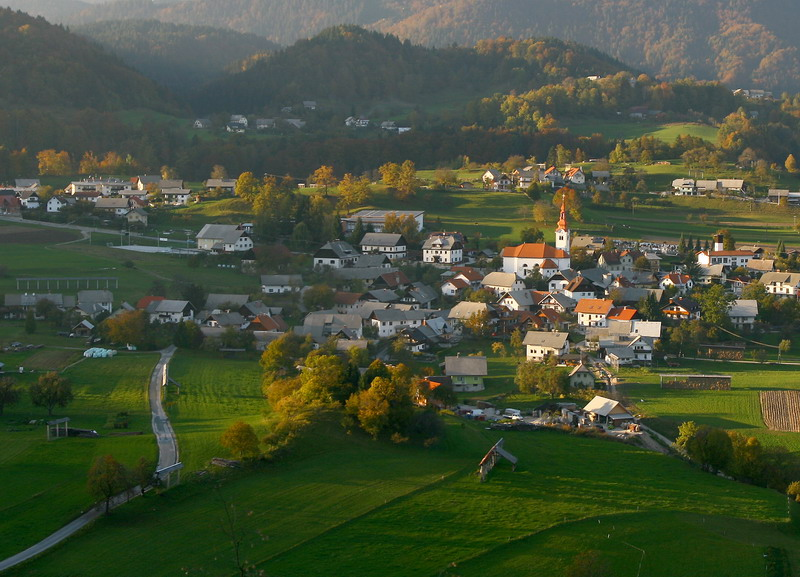

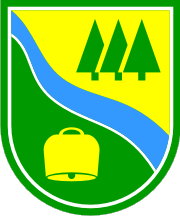
- Coat of arms

- Location in Slovenia
- Coordinates: 46°22′48.5″N 14°4′6.31″E
- Country: Slovenia
- Traditional Region: Upper Carniola
- Statistical region: Upper Carniola
- Municipality: Gorje
- Elevation: 608.8 m (1,997 ft)

Population (2002)
  - Total: 532

Zgornje Gorje (pronounced [ˈzɡoːɾnjɛ ˈɡɔːɾjɛ]) is a village and the administrative centre of the Municipality of Gorje in the Upper Carniola region of Slovenia.

== Name ==
The name Zgornje Gorje literally means 'upper Gorje', distinguishing the settlement from neighboring Spodnje Gorje (literally, 'lower Gorje'). The two settlements were attested in Latin in 1050–65 as in loco qui dicitur Summitas campi and in loco qui dicitur z Obinentigemo uelde (both 'in the place called top of the field'). The name Gorje is derived from the plural demonym *Gorjane 'mountain residents', derived from the common noun gora 'mountain'.

== Church ==
The parish church in the village is dedicated to Saint George. There are two monuments designed by Jože Plečnik here: a monument to villagers that died in the Second World War and a private grave monument to the Košir family.

== Notable people ==
Notable people that were born or lived in Zgornje Gorje include:

- Jernej Černe (1857–1906), beekeeper
- Ivan Krizostom Švegel (1875–1962), diplomat and politician
- Jožef Schwegel (1836–1914), politician and diplomat
- Jožef Škrinar (1753–1825), writer, translator and priest
