= Laze nad Krko =

Laze nad Krko Laze (until 1953)
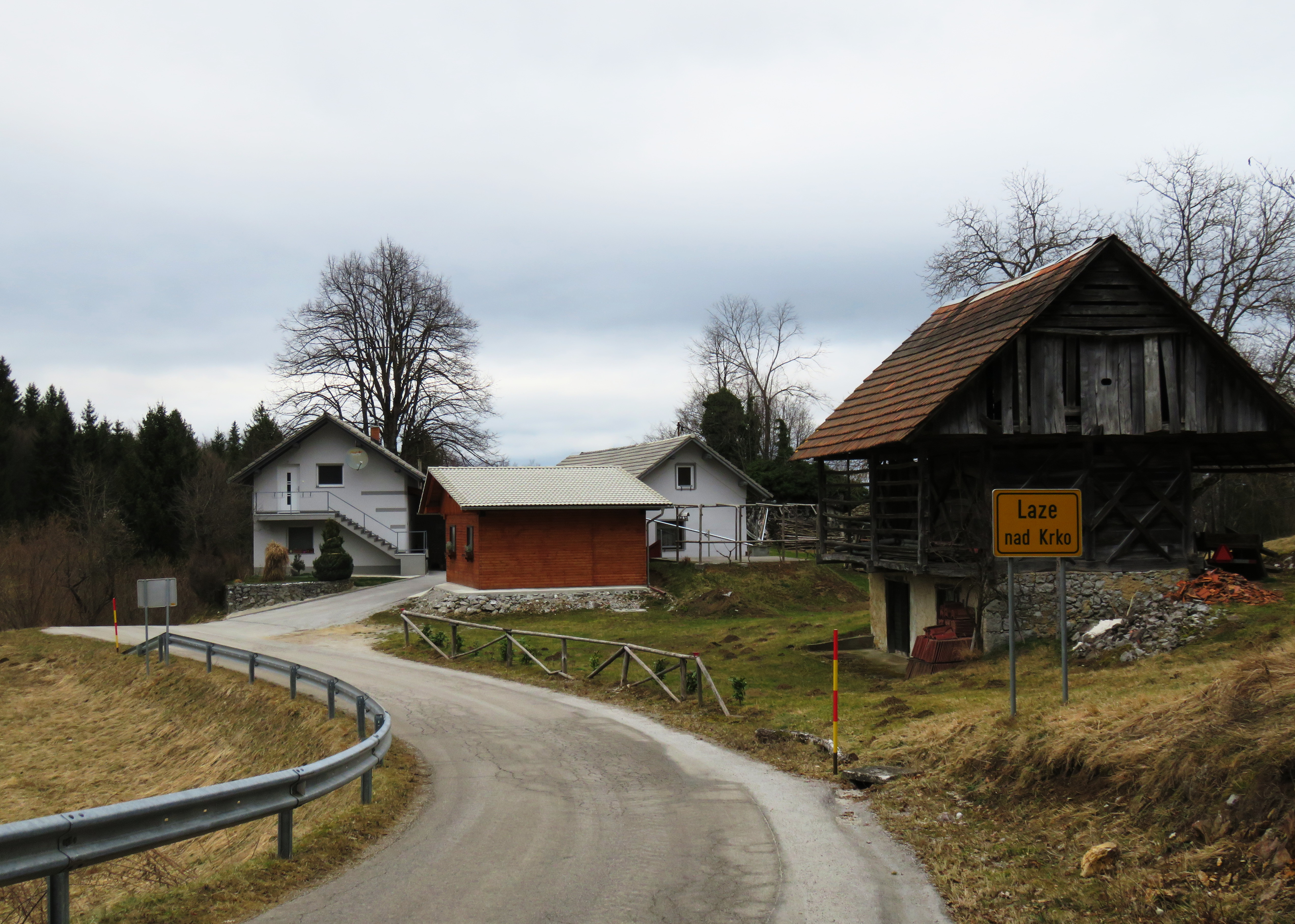

- Location in Slovenia
- Coordinates: 45°51′25.88″N 14°47′21.98″E
- Country: Slovenia
- Traditional region: Lower Carniola
- Statistical region: Central Slovenia
- Municipality: Ivančna Gorica

Area
  - Total: 1.75 km^{2} (0.68 sq mi)
- Elevation: 561 m (1,841 ft)

Population (2002)
  - Total: 34

Laze nad Krko (pronounced [ˈlaːzɛ nat ˈkəɾkɔ]) is a dispersed settlement in the hills south of Krka in the Municipality of Ivančna Gorica in central Slovenia. The area is part of the historical region of Lower Carniola. The municipality is now included in the Central Slovenia Statistical Region.

== Name ==
The name of the settlement was changed from Laze to Laze nad Krko in 1953.
