= Laze, Novo Mesto =

Laze
- Location in Slovenia
- Coordinates: 45°42′3.6″N 15°8′8.14″E
- Country: Slovenia
- Traditional region: Lower Carniola
- Statistical region: Southeast Slovenia
- Municipality: Novo Mesto

Area
  - Total: 11.446 km^{2} (4.419 sq mi)
- Elevation: 337.3 m (1,107 ft)

Population (2026)
  - Total: 66
  - Density: 6/km^{2} (16/sq mi)
- Postal code: 8323

Laze (pronounced [ˈlaːzɛ]; German: Reuter, also Reuther or Laase) is a settlement south of Novo Mesto in southeastern Slovenia. The railway line from Ljubljana to Metlika runs through the settlement. The area is part of the traditional region of Lower Carniola and is now included in the Southeast Slovenia Statistical Region. In January 2026, the population was 66.

The local church, built on the southern outskirts of the village, is dedicated to Saint Matthias and belongs to the Parish of Toplice. It dates to the late 17th century.
