= Laze pri Gorenjem Jezeru =

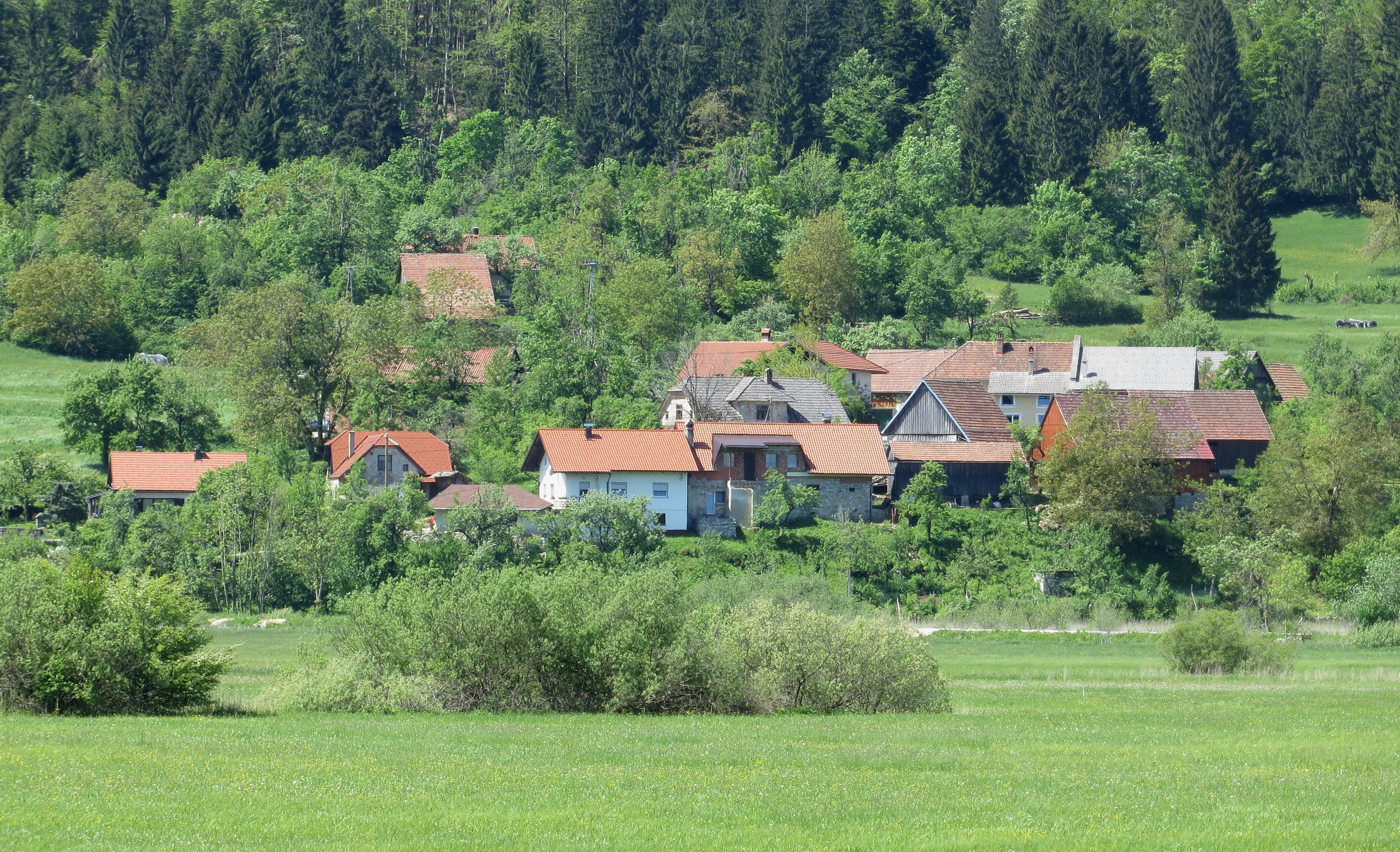

- Location in Slovenia
- Coordinates: 45°43′26.06″N 14°24′1.49″E
- Country: Slovenia
- Traditional region: Inner Carniola
- Statistical region: Littoral–Inner Carniola
- Municipality: Cerknica

Area
  - Total: 13.23 km^{2} (5.11 sq mi)
- Elevation: 564.21 m (1,851.1 ft)

Population (2020)
  - Total: 18
  - Density: 1.4/km^{2} (3.5/sq mi)

Laze pri Gorenjem Jezeru (pronounced [ˈlaːzɛ pɾi ɡɔˈɾeːnjɛm ˈjeːzɛɾu], German: Laase) is a small settlement next to Gorenje Jezero on the southern edge of Lake Cerknica in the Municipality of Cerknica in the Inner Carniola region of Slovenia.

== Name ==
The name of the settlement was changed from Laze to Laze pri Gorenjem Jezeru in 1953.

== Church ==
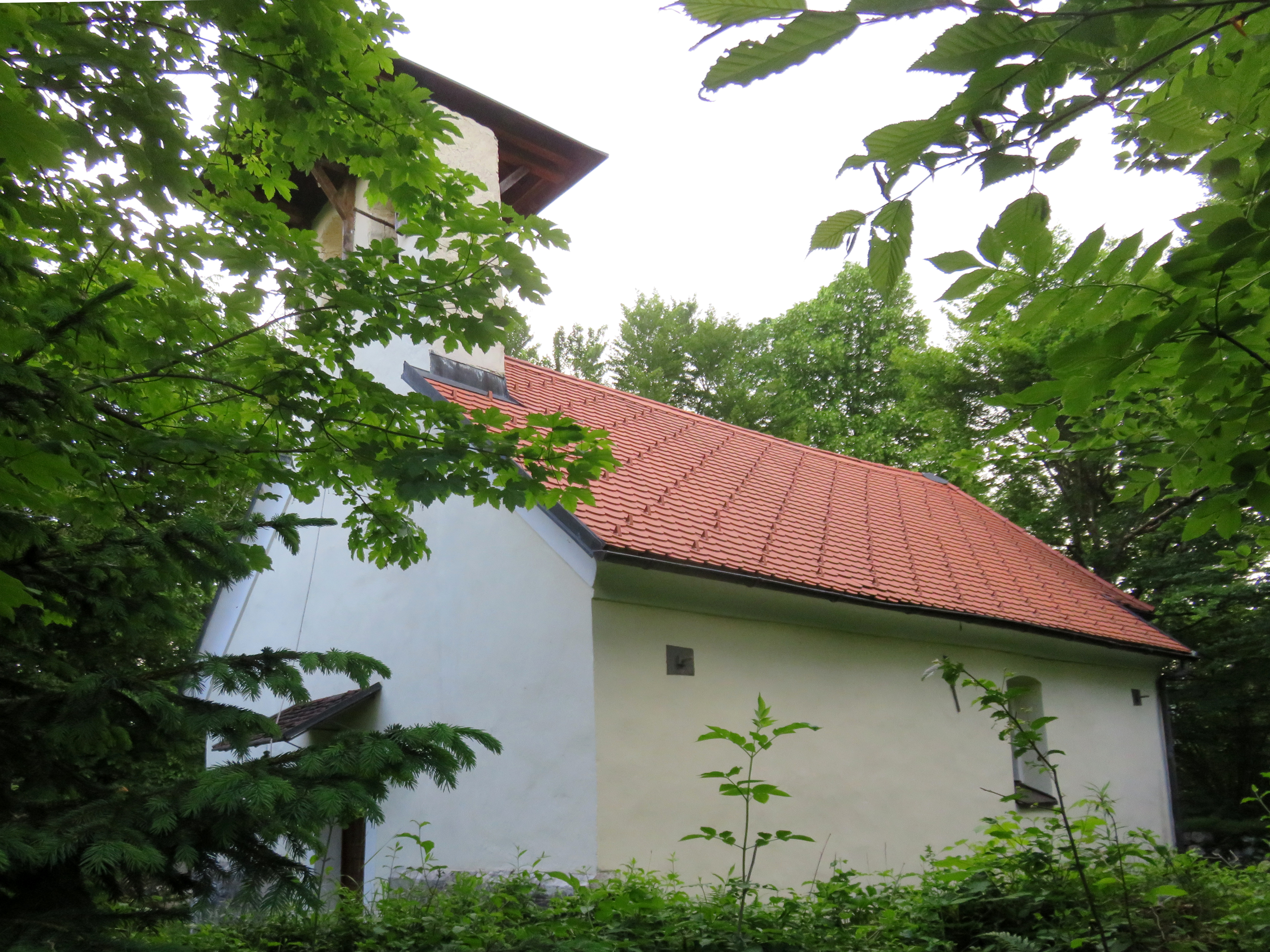
Saint Brice's Church

The local church west of the settlement is dedicated to St. Brice and belongs to the Parish of Stari Trg pri Ložu.
