= Laze, Velike Lašče =

Laze
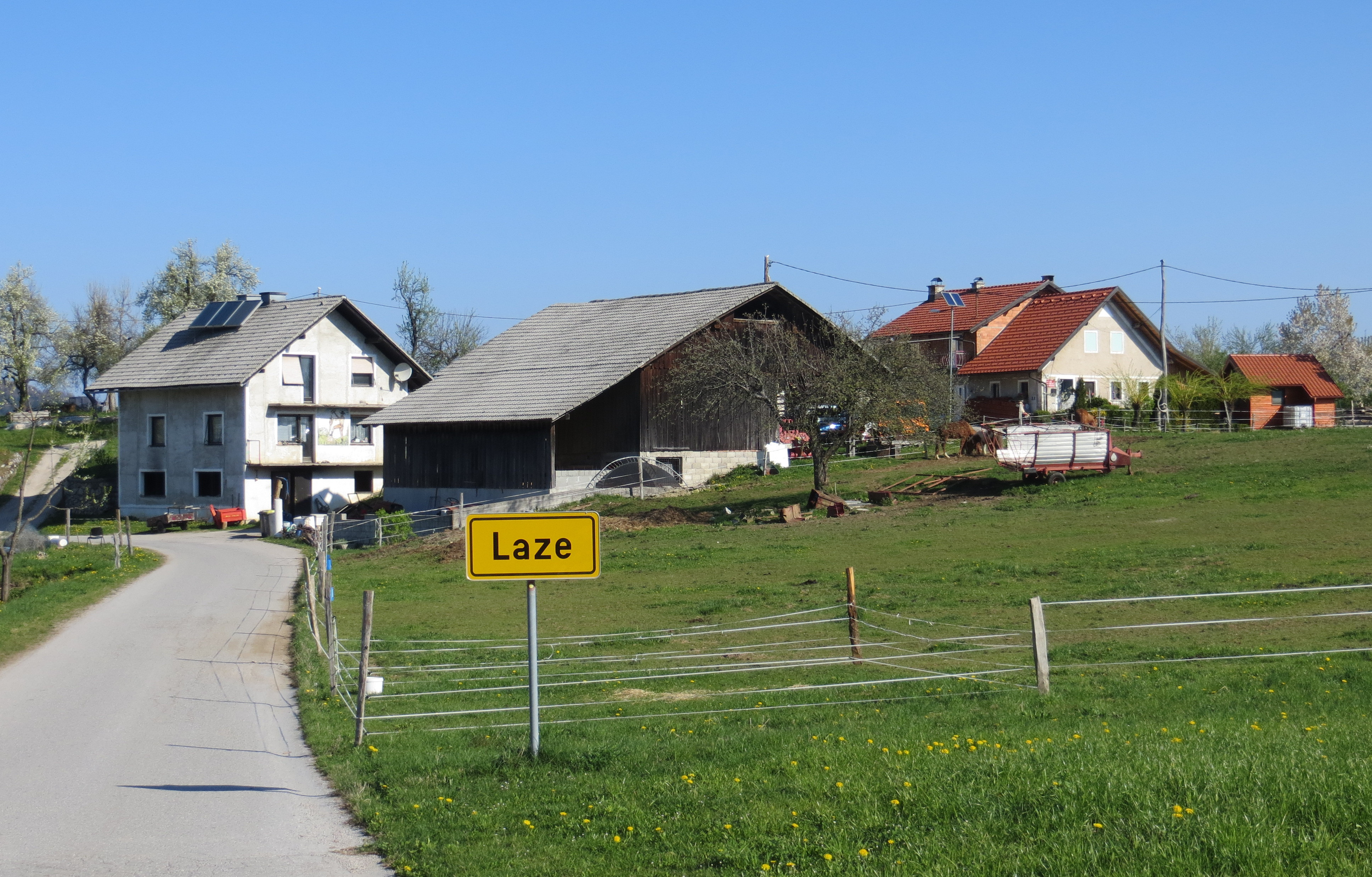

- Location in Slovenia
- Coordinates: 45°51′26.44″N 14°34′58.37″E
- Country: Slovenia
- Traditional region: Lower Carniola
- Statistical region: Central Slovenia
- Municipality: Velike Lašče

Area
  - Total: 0.41 km^{2} (0.16 sq mi)
- Elevation: 650.4 m (2,134 ft)

Population (2002)
  - Total: 16
- Postal code: 1315

Laze (pronounced [ˈlaːzɛ]) is a small settlement in the hills west of Rašica in the Municipality of Velike Lašče in central Slovenia. The entire municipality is part of the traditional region of Lower Carniola and is now included in the Central Slovenia Statistical Region.
