= Krnica, Gorje =

Krnica
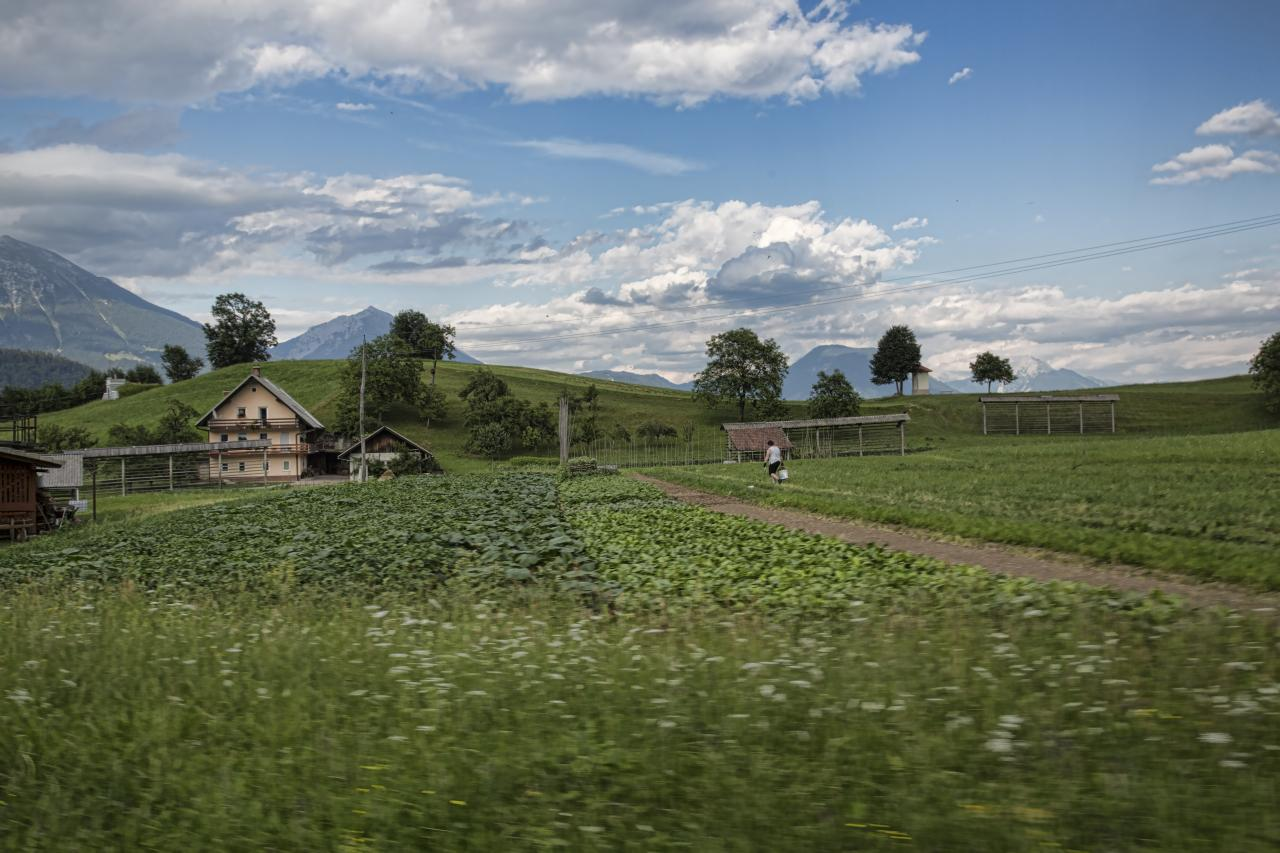

- Location in Slovenia
- Coordinates: 46°22′39.03″N 14°3′17.8″E
- Country: Slovenia
- Traditional Region: Upper Carniola
- Statistical region: Upper Carniola
- Municipality: Gorje

Area
  - Total: 70.4 km^{2} (27.2 sq mi)
- Elevation: 616 m (2,021 ft)

Population (2020)
  - Total: 427
  - Density: 6.07/km^{2} (15.7/sq mi)

Krnica (pronounced [kəɾˈniːtsa]) is a settlement in the Municipality of Gorje in the Upper Carniola region of Slovenia.

== Geography ==
The Pokljuka Gorge begins at Krnica.

== History ==
Krnica included the hamlet of Zatrnik until 2020, when it became a separate settlement.

== Notable people ==
Notable people that were born or lived in Krnica include:

- Tone Polda (1917–1945), writer and poet
