= Laze pri Dolskem =

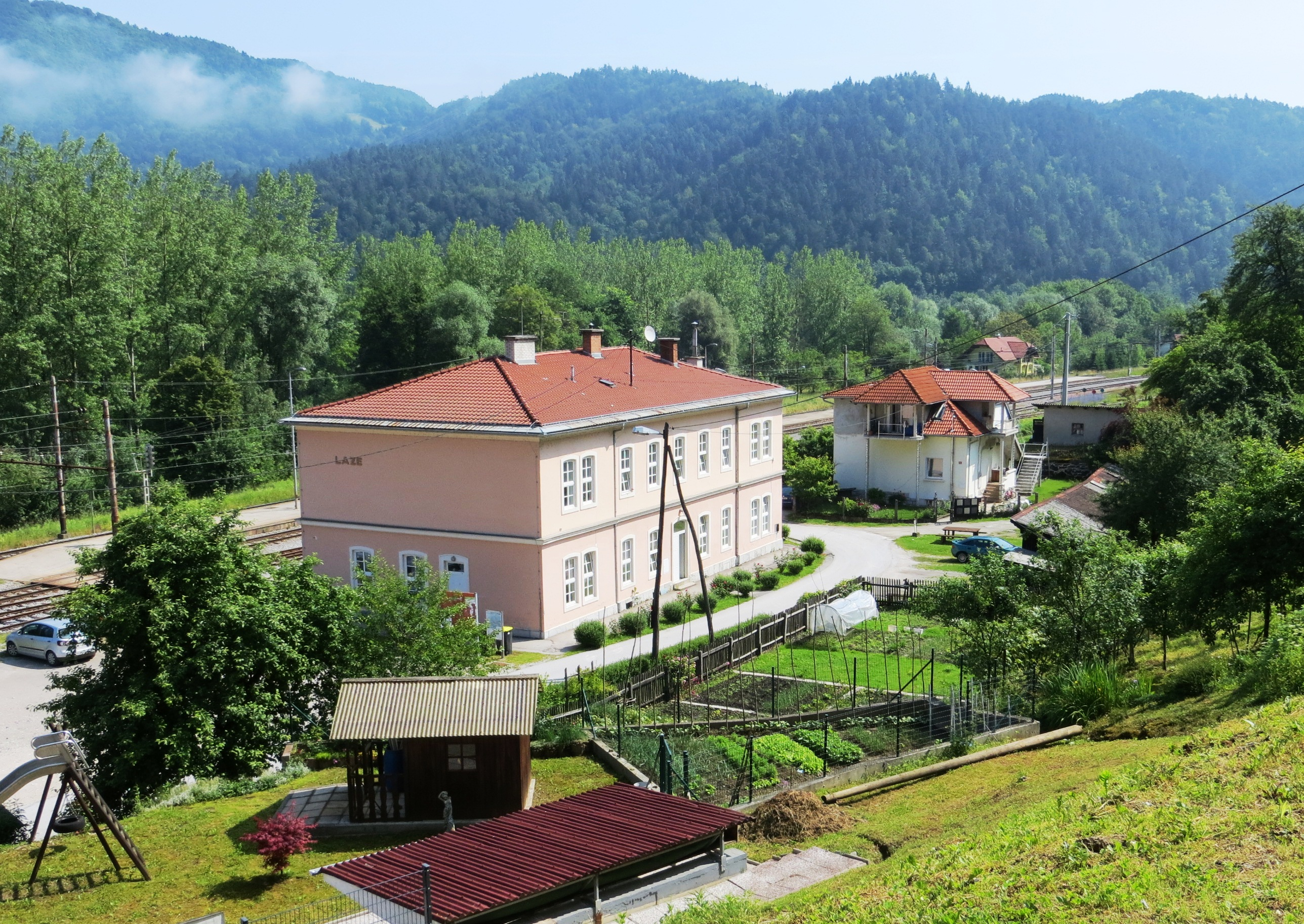

- Location in Slovenia
- Coordinates: 46°5′15.6″N 14°41′20.41″E
- Country: Slovenia
- Traditional region: Upper Carniola
- Statistical region: Central Slovenia
- Municipality: Dol pri Ljubljani

Area
  - Total: 3.84 km^{2} (1.48 sq mi)
- Elevation: 274.8 m (902 ft)

Population (2020)
  - Total: 239
  - Density: 62.2/km^{2} (161/sq mi)

Laze pri Dolskem (pronounced [ˈlaːzɛ pɾi ˈdoːu̯skɛm] or [ˈlaːzɛ pɾi ˈdoːlskɛm]) is a settlement on the right bank of the Sava River in the Municipality of Dol pri Ljubljani in the eastern Upper Carniola region of Slovenia. The settlement includes the hamlet of Slapnica to the east and the isolated Rogač farm above the main settlement.

== Name ==
The name of the settlement was changed from Laze to Laze pri Dolskem in 1953. The name Laze is derived from the common noun laz 'cleared area in or next to a forest overgrown with grass'. This was originally a masculine plural noun (preserved in some other toponyms such as Dolenji Lazi), but it became a feminine plural noun like similar toponyms (e.g., Laze, Zgornje Laže, etc.) due to the ambiguous accusative ending in -e.

== History ==
At the beginning of the 20th century, a grave dating from the Migration Period was found near the Hribar house, testifying to early settlement in the area. A former mill along Slapnica Creek was torn down between the two world wars. The former inn in Laze pri Dolskem closed in 1964.

== Notable people ==
Notable people that were born or lived in Laze pri Dolskem include:

- Janez Smrekar (1853–1920), social worker
