= Zgornje Laze =

- Location in Slovenia
- Coordinates: 46°23′26.92″N 14°3′52.08″E
- Country: Slovenia
- Traditional Region: Upper Carniola
- Statistical region: Upper Carniola
- Municipality: Gorje
- Elevation: 722.9 m (2,372 ft)

Population (2020)
  - Total: 54

Zgornje Laze (pronounced [ˈzɡoːɾnjɛ ˈlaːzɛ]) is a settlement in the Municipality of Gorje in the Upper Carniola region of Slovenia.
