= Spodnje Laze =

- Location in Slovenia
- Coordinates: 46°23′11.53″N 14°3′36.43″E
- Country: Slovenia
- Traditional Region: Upper Carniola
- Statistical region: Upper Carniola
- Municipality: Gorje
- Elevation: 685.7 m (2,250 ft)

Population (2020)
  - Total: 53

Spodnje Laze (pronounced [ˈspoːdnjɛ ˈlaːzɛ]) is a settlement in the Municipality of Gorje in the Upper Carniola region of Slovenia.
