= Laze pri Gobniku =

- Location in Slovenia
- Coordinates: 45°59′39.84″N 14°55′55.99″E
- Country: Slovenia
- Traditional region: Lower Carniola
- Statistical region: Central Sava
- Municipality: Litija

Area
  - Total: 2.06 km^{2} (0.80 sq mi)
- Elevation: 595.2 m (1,953 ft)

Population (2002)
  - Total: 31
- Postal code: 1274

Laze pri Gobniku (pronounced [ˈlaːzɛ pɾi ˈɡoːbniku]) is a settlement west of Gabrovka in the Municipality of Litija in central Slovenia. The area is part of the traditional region of Lower Carniola. It is now included with the rest of the municipality in the Central Sava Statistical Region.

== Cirkna Manor ==
Cirkna Manor (German: Zirknahof) is a small isolated early-17th-century mansion located at Laze pri Gobniku no. 6 in the hamlet of Cerkno south of the main settlement. It is a two-story rectangular structure with six windows on the long sides and four on the short sides. The central part of the facade projects from the building, with a stone door casing and two niches on the ground floor, and pilasters on the upper floor.
