= Municipality of Gorje =

Municipality of Slovenia

Municipality of Gorje Občina Gorje
- Municipality
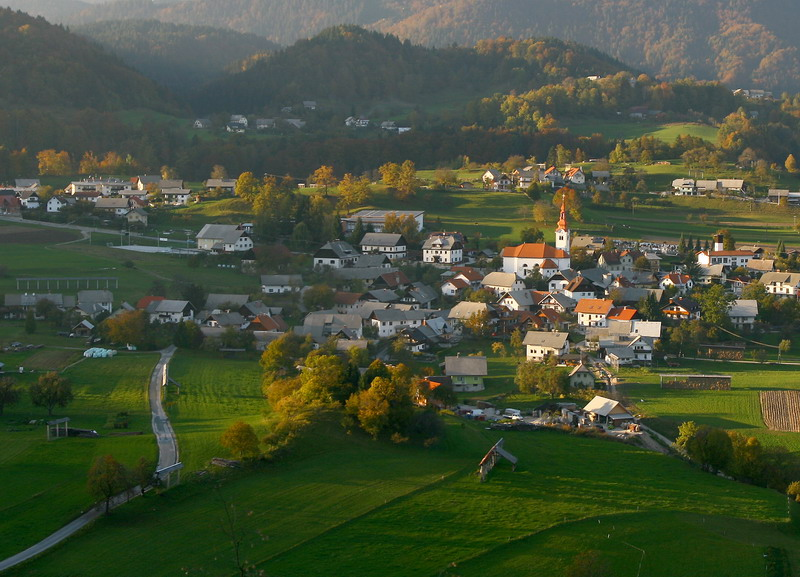
- Zgornje Gorje

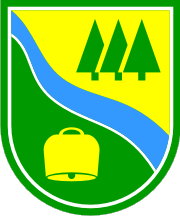
- Coat of arms

- Location of the Municipality of Gorje in Slovenia
- Coordinates: 46°23′29.27″N 13°58′21.18″E
- Country: Slovenia

Government
  - Mayor: Peter Torkar (Independent)

Area
  - Total: 116 km^{2} (45 sq mi)

Population (2012)
  - Total: 2,869
  - Density: 24.7/km^{2} (64.1/sq mi)
- Time zone: UTC+01 (CET)
  - Summer (DST): UTC+02 (CEST)
- Website: www.gorje.si

The Municipality of Gorje (pronounced [ˈɡɔːɾjɛ]; Slovene: Občina Gorje) is a municipality in Slovenia. It was established in 2006 and came into existence on 1 January 2007, when it split from the Municipality of Bled.

== Settlements ==
In addition to the municipal seat of Zgornje Gorje, the municipality also includes the following settlements:

- Grabče
- Krnica
- Mevkuž
- Perniki
- Podhom
- Poljšica pri Gorjah
- Radovna
- Spodnje Gorje
- Spodnje Laze
- Višelnica
- Zgornje Laze
