= Dolenji Lazi =

- Location in Slovenia
- Coordinates: 45°45′27.68″N 14°42′51.21″E
- Country: Slovenia
- Traditional region: Lower Carniola
- Statistical region: Southeast Slovenia
- Municipality: Ribnica

Area
  - Total: 0.92 km^{2} (0.36 sq mi)
- Elevation: 499.9 m (1,640 ft)

Population (2002)
  - Total: 246
- Postal code: 1310

Dolenji Lazi (pronounced [dɔˈleːnji ˈlaːzi]; German: Niedergereuth) is a settlement north of Ribnica in southern Slovenia. The railway line from Ljubljana to Kočevje runs through the settlement. The area is part of the traditional region of Lower Carniola and is now included in the Southeast Slovenia Statistical Region.

== Name ==
The name Dolenji Lazi means 'lower clearings', contrasting with nearby Gorenji Lazi (literally, 'upper clearings'), which lies about 100 meters (330 ft) higher in elevation. The name refers to land that was cleared for settlement.
