= Gradiške Laze =

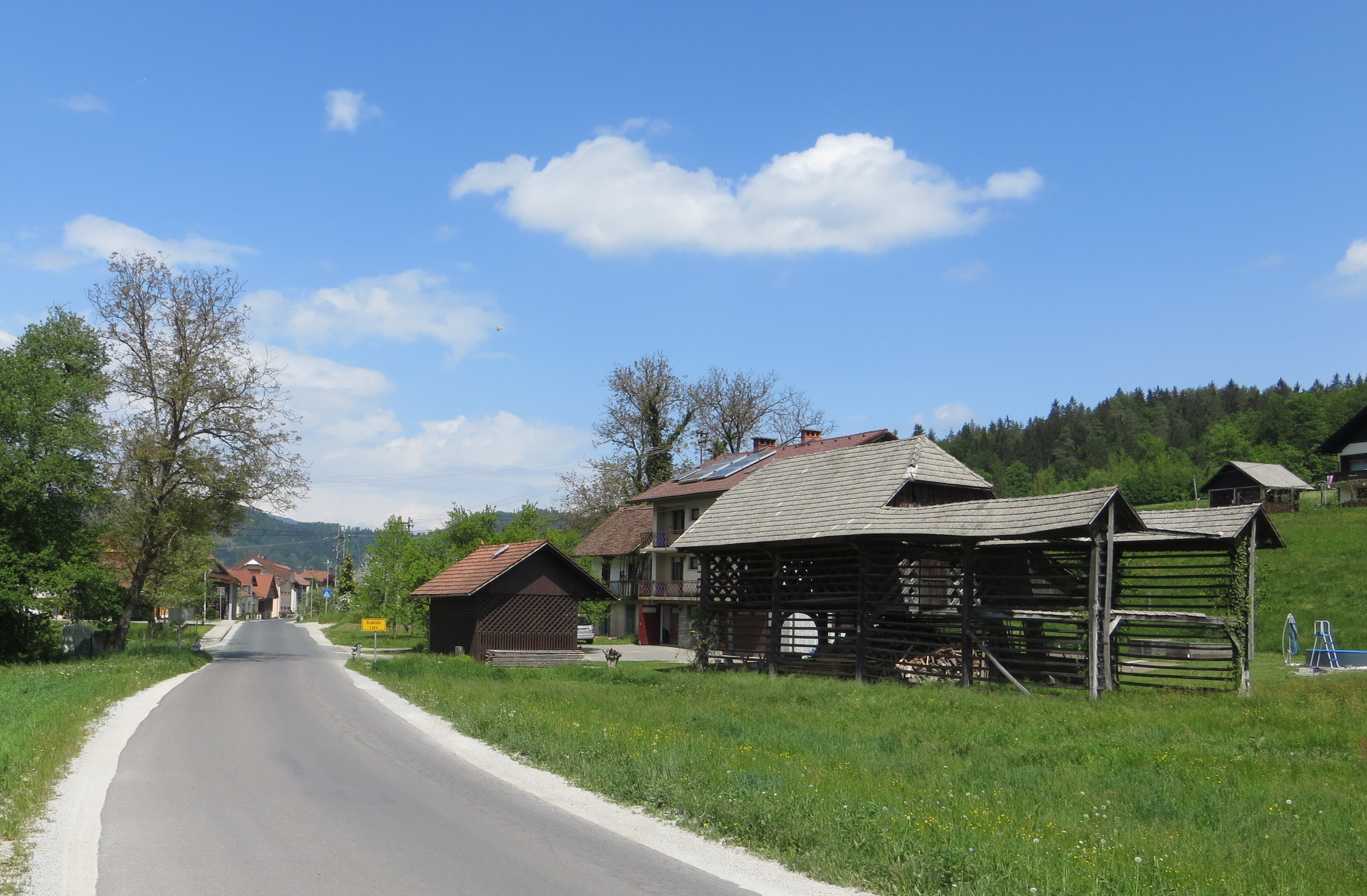

- Location in Slovenia
- Coordinates: 46°3′5.62″N 14°51′43.6″E
- Country: Slovenia
- Traditional region: Lower Carniola
- Statistical region: Central Slovenia
- Municipality: Šmartno pri Litiji

Area
  - Total: 0.74 km^{2} (0.29 sq mi)
- Elevation: 262.9 m (863 ft)

Population (2002)
  - Total: 146

Gradiške Laze (pronounced [ɡɾaˈdiːʃkɛ ˈlaːzɛ]; German: Lase) is a small settlement to the east of Litija in central Slovenia. It belongs to the Municipality of Šmartno pri Litiji. The area is part of the historical region of Lower Carniola and is now included in the Central Slovenia Statistical Region.
