= Šent Lovrenc, Litija =

Šent Lovrenc
- Location in Slovenia
- Coordinates: 46°1′52″N 15°04′26″E
- Country: Slovenia
- Traditional region: Lower Carniola
- Statistical region: Central Sava
- Municipality: Litija
- Elevation: 654 m (2,146 ft)

Šent Lovrenc (pronounced [ʃɛnt ˈloːu̯ɾɛnts] or [ʃənt ˈloːu̯ɾɛnts], German: Sankt Lorenz) is a former settlement in the Municipality of Litija in central Slovenia. It is now parts of the villages of Gradišče, Ježevec, Prelesje, and Strmec. The area is part of the traditional region of Lower Carniola and is now included with the rest of the municipality in the Central Sava Statistical Region.

== Geography ==
Šent Lovrenc was a large scattered village below the southwestern slope of Jatna Hill (elevation: 851 meters or 2,792 feet), comprising the hamlets of Bobneči Vrh, Briše, Dobje, Gradišče, Javorje, Jelševec, Mlake, Podstrmec, Sedeše, and Strmec.

== Name ==
The name Šent Lovrenc is derived from Saint Lawrence's Church, now in the separate village of Prelesje.

== History ==
Šent Lovrenc had a population of 341 living in 68 houses in 1900, and 340 living in 53 houses in 1931. In 1953, Šent Lovrenc was divided among what are now the villages of Gradišče, Ježevec, Prelesje, and Strmec, ending its existence as a separate settlement. The elimination of the name Šent Lovrenc was in line with the 1948 Law on Names of Settlements and Designations of Squares, Streets, and Buildings as part of efforts by Slovenia's postwar communist government to remove religious elements from toponyms.
