= Giambattista Orsini =

Italian Roman Catholic cardinal

His Eminence Giambattista Orsini
- Cardinal-Priest of Santi Giovanni e Paolo
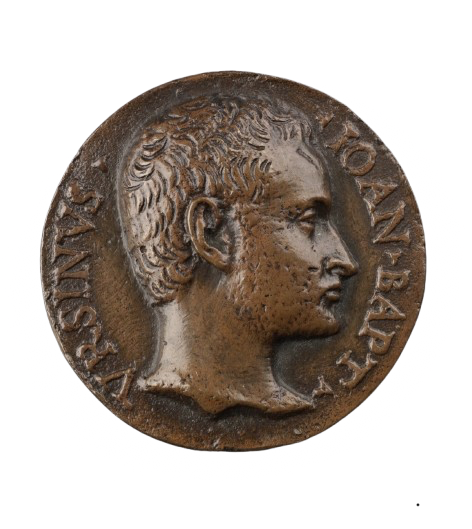
- Medal of Cardinal Orsini, 15th century
- Church: Catholic Church
- Appointed: 27 February 1493
- Term ended: 22 February 1503
- Predecessor: Ardicino della Porta
- Successor: Francisco de Remolins
- Other posts: Archpriest of Santa Maria Maggiore (1498-1503)
- Previous posts: See list: Cardinal-Deacon of Santa Maria in Domnica (1483-1484); Cardinal-Deacon of Santa Maria Nova (1489-1493)

Orders
- Created cardinal: 15 November 1483 by Pope Sixtus IV
- Rank: Cardinal-Priest

Personal details
- Born: 1450 Rome, Papal States
- Died: 22 February 1503 (aged 52–53) Rome, Papal States
- Buried: San Salvatore in Lauro
- Coat of arms

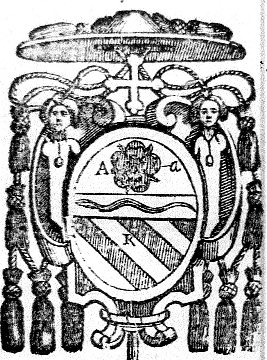
Coat of arms of Cardinal Giambattista Orsini.

Giambattista Orsini (died February 22, 1503) (also called Giovanni Battista Orsini or Jean-Baptiste des Ursins) was an Italian Roman Catholic cardinal. He served as papal legate to the Marches of Ancona.

== Biography ==
Giambattista Orsini was born in Rome before 1450, the son of Lorenzo Orsini, signore of Monte Rotondo, and Clarice Orsini, sister of Cardinal Latino Orsini. Notable family members also include his nephews Giovanni "Leo" de' Medici and Piero de' Medici, and his brother-in-law Lorenzo de' Medici. Giambattista Orsini was the leader of the Guelph Party, meaning that he was against the election of a Holy Roman Emperor. The Orsini's greatest rival was the Roman noble Colonna family.

Little is known from his education and childhood, with the exception of the fact that his family’s upper class status certainly favored his ecclesiastical career, as he became nominated at a young age to the roles of cleric of the apostolic chamber, auditor of the Roman Sacra Rota, and canon of the chapter of the Lateran Basilica. In 1477, his uncle Latino Orsini resigned from his duty at the Benedictian monastery of San Salvatore Maggiore near Rieti, and shortly after Gianbattista was nominated as protonotary apostolic.

After being the abbot of Farfa in 1482, Orsini was nominated as the deacon cardinal of Pope Sixtus IV in the consistory of 15 November 1483, receiving the diakonia of Santa Maria in Domnica. He received the deaconry of Santa Maria in Domnica. and the red hat on November 19, 1483. Already in 1484, he had participated in the conclave that elected Pope Innocent VIII. The new pope named Cardinal Orsini papal legate to the March of Ancona on September 22, 1484. The Orsini were hostile to Pope Cybo, but Giovanni Battista proved his qualities as a peacemaker, avoiding too strong a fracture between the papacy and his family. At the end of the year, he was nominated as the papal legate from Marche, and on January 22, 1485, he obtained from the pope the permit to fortify the region to resist the continuous attacks from the Ottomans. He returned to Rome in 1486 to try to fix the disagreement between the Orsini family and the Pope. In the end of 1488, he renounced the deacon of Santa Maria in Domnica, opting instead for that of Santa Maria Nuova.

In 1490 he was nominated as the apostolic administrator for the Archdiocese of Taranto, a title held earlier by his maternal uncle, Cardinal Latino Orsini, and which, like his uncle, he governed by proxy. He maintained this role until September 24, 1498. Orsini was also entrusted with the administration of these provinces of Romagna, and Bologna. On August 3, 1492, he had the task of receiving in Rome the cardinal Maffeo Gherardi, the patriarch of Venice, and he became preoccupied with escorting him in the sacristy of the Basilica of Saint Peter where the Sacred College of Cardinals were reunited during the interregnum. As a supporter of the election of Rodrigo Borgia to become pope, he participated in the conclave of 1492. Borgia became pope under the name Alexander VI. He gave the Orsini a Roman palace, and the castle of Soriano and Monticelli. Alexander VI nominated him as legate of Marca Anconetana, a role that he maintained until 1500, when he was nominated as the papal legate in Bologna and the bishop of Cartagena ad commendam, a custody he held until March of the next year. A month before he left the diakonia of Santa Maria Nuova, he opted for the title of Cardinal of Saints Giovanni and Paolo (title of Cardinal-presbyter).

On March 12, 1493, Giovanni Battista Orsini was ordained as a priest in his Roman titular church. He subsequently refrained from visiting King Charles VIII of France when he entered Rome on 31 December, 1494, because he preferred to take refuge with the pontiff in the Castel Sant'Angelo on January 7, 1495. Since he was elected as Camerlengo of the Sacred College of Cardinals on January 21, 1495, he was absent from Rome for a few days in March 1495 to then accompany the Pope to Orvieto on May 27, 1495, when the French army was approaching Rome. The two of them, alongside the rest of the papal court, returned to the Vatican the following 27th of June. In Rome, in September 1498, he was appointed as archpriest of the Basilica of Santa Maria Maggiore.

In September 1499 he was nominated as Papal legate to the king of France, Louis XII, in Milan. On May 22, 1500, he abandoned the custody of the monastery of San Lorenzo in favor of his nephew, Aldobrandini di Pitigliano. He left his legation of the Marca Anconetana on 29 July 1500 and was appointed legate in Bologna. The participation in an Orsini family reunion near Lake Trasimeno, during which a conspiracy against Alexander VI was discussed, without success, caused him to become arrested by the later and led to his imprisonment first in Tor di Nona, and then, January 3, 1503, in Castel Sant’Angelo, where he died from poisoning twenty days later. The pontiff ordered two doctors to write up a document that certified his death was from natural causes, and had a solemn funeral organized for the cardinal. His remains were buried in the church of San Salvatore in Lauro, overlooking the castle.

== 1492 conclave ==
Cardinal Orsini was very influential in the papal conclave of 1492, held in August of that year. Cardinal Rodrigo Borgia was elected, taking the name Alexander VI. The election is notorious for allegations that Borgia bought the votes of his electors, promising them lucrative appointments and gifts. According to ecclesiastical historian Johann Peter Kirsch, Borgia's election was almost entirely due to Cardinal Orsini. Cardinal Gherardi, Patriarch of Venice, who had pushed for Orsini's election, cast the deciding vote.

Soon afterwards, debts appear in the financial records of the Apostolic Camera to Cardinal Orsini and others. Orsini received the fortified towns of Monticelli and Soriano, and the bishopric of Cartagena, with annual revenue of 5,000 ducats. On August 31, 1492, the new pope named Orsini papal legate to the March of Ancona. On February 27, 1493, Orsini opted for the order of cardinal priests and received the titular church of Santi Giovanni e Paolo. He was ordained as a priest in his titular church on March 12, 1493.

When Charles VIII of France came to Rome on December 31, 1494, as part of the Italian Wars, Cardinal Orsini went with the pope to the Castel Sant'Angelo. On January 21, 1495, he was elected Camerlengo of the Sacred College of Cardinals. On May 27, 1495, with a French army approaching Rome, Cardinal Orsini left with the pope for Orvieto. He became archpriest of the Basilica di Santa Maria Maggiore in September 1498. On September 23, 1499, he left Rome for Milan as papal legate to the King of France; he returned on November 16. In 1500, he was again papal legate to the March of Ancona, leaving on his legation on July 29, 1500.

Giambattista, together with the head of the House of Orsini, the Duke of Bracciano, espoused the cause of the Florentines and the French. On July 12, 1502, he asked the pope for permission to visit the King of France in Milan; the pope did not agree, but Orsini nevertheless left the next day, attending a meeting of the Orsini family at Lake Trasimeno to conspire against the pope's son, Cesare Borgia. Orsini was soon thereafter arrested on the pope's orders and flung into the dungeons at Castel Sant'Angelo. He died there twelve days later, on February 22, 1503, probably poisoned on the orders of the pope or Cesare Borgia.

Catholic Church titles
Preceded by Ferry de Clugny	Cardinal-Deacon of Santa Maria in Domnica; 1483–1489	Succeeded by Giovanni de' Medici
Preceded by Giovanni Arcimboldo	Cardinal-Deacon of Santa Maria Nuova; 1489–1493	Succeeded by Cesare Borgia
Preceded by Francesco de Paretz	Administrator of Taranto; 1490–1498	Succeeded by Enrico Bruno
Preceded by Ardicino della Porta, iuniore	Cardinal-Priest of Santi Giovanni e Paolo; 1493–1503	Succeeded by Francisco de Remolins
Preceded by Battista Pontini	Administrator of Bitonto; 1501	Succeeded by Giovanni Francesco de Orsini
