= Gorenje Jelenje =

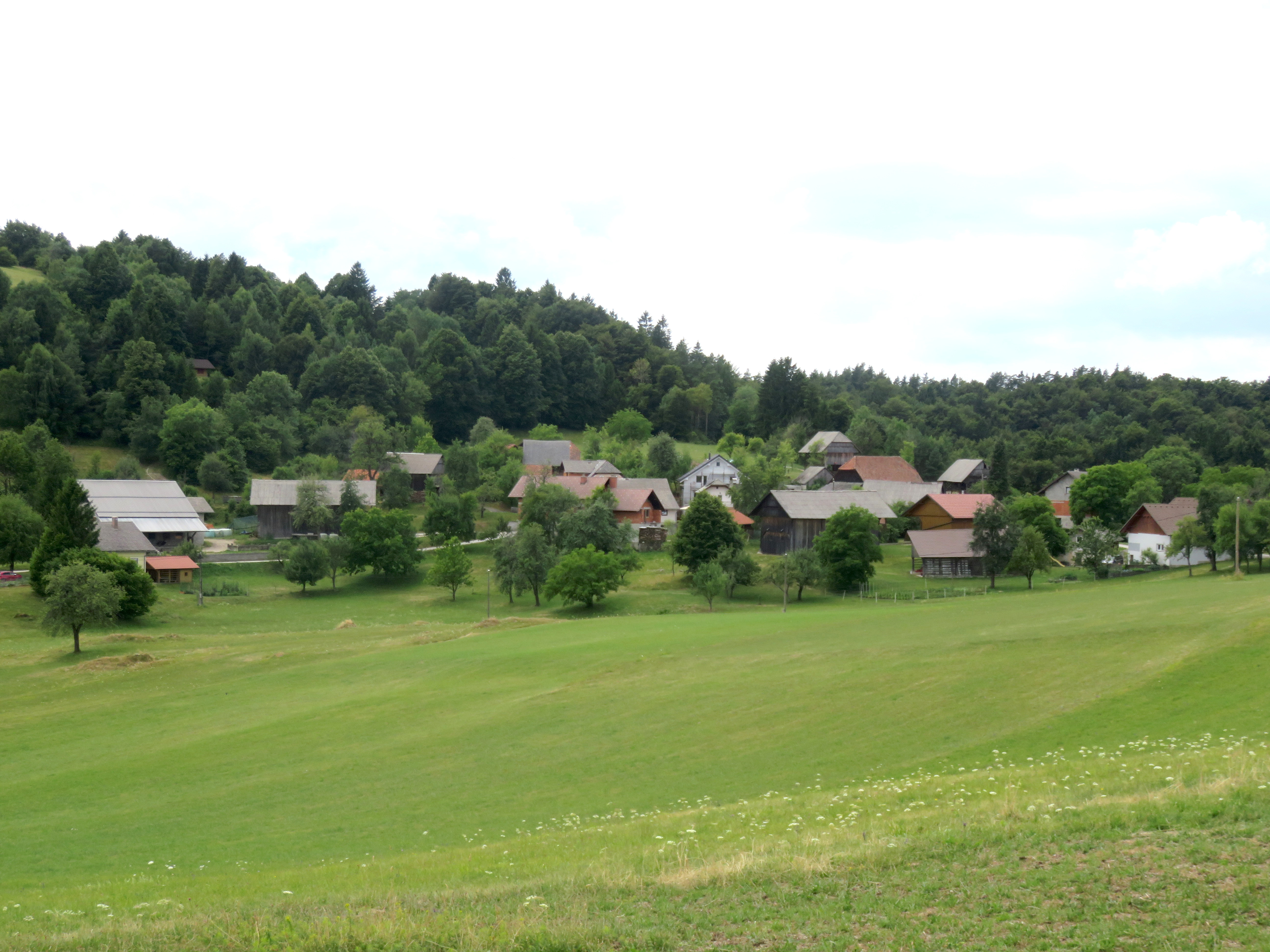

- Location in Slovenia
- Coordinates: 46°2′55.23″N 14°59′38.59″E
- Country: Slovenia
- Traditional region: Lower Carniola
- Statistical region: Central Sava
- Municipality: Litija

Area
  - Total: 2.17 km^{2} (0.84 sq mi)
- Elevation: 766.3 m (2,514 ft)

Population (2002)
  - Total: 10
- Postal code: 1273

Gorenje Jelenje (pronounced [ɡɔˈɾeːnjɛ jɛˈleːnjɛ]; in older sources also Gorenje Jeline, German: Oberjeline) is a settlement northwest of Dole in the Municipality of Litija in central Slovenia. The area is part of the traditional region of Lower Carniola. It is now included with the rest of the municipality in the Central Sava Statistical Region; until January 2014, the municipality was part of the Central Slovenia Statistical Region.

== Name ==
The name Gorenje Jelenje literally means 'upper Jelenje'; it lies about 37 meters (121 ft) higher in elevation than neighboring Spodnje Jelenje (literally, 'lower Jelenje'). Gorenje Jelenje was attested in historical sources together with Spodnje Jelenje as Hiersueld in 1406 and Hirsveld in 1419, and separately as Ober Hyrssenueld in 1445 and Ober Hiersenfeld in 1463, among other variations. The name is derived from the common noun jelen 'deer'. Together with Jelenska Reber, the names of these villages are believed to refer to a deer park that the castle lords in the Central Sava Valley maintained for hunting in the area.

== Church ==
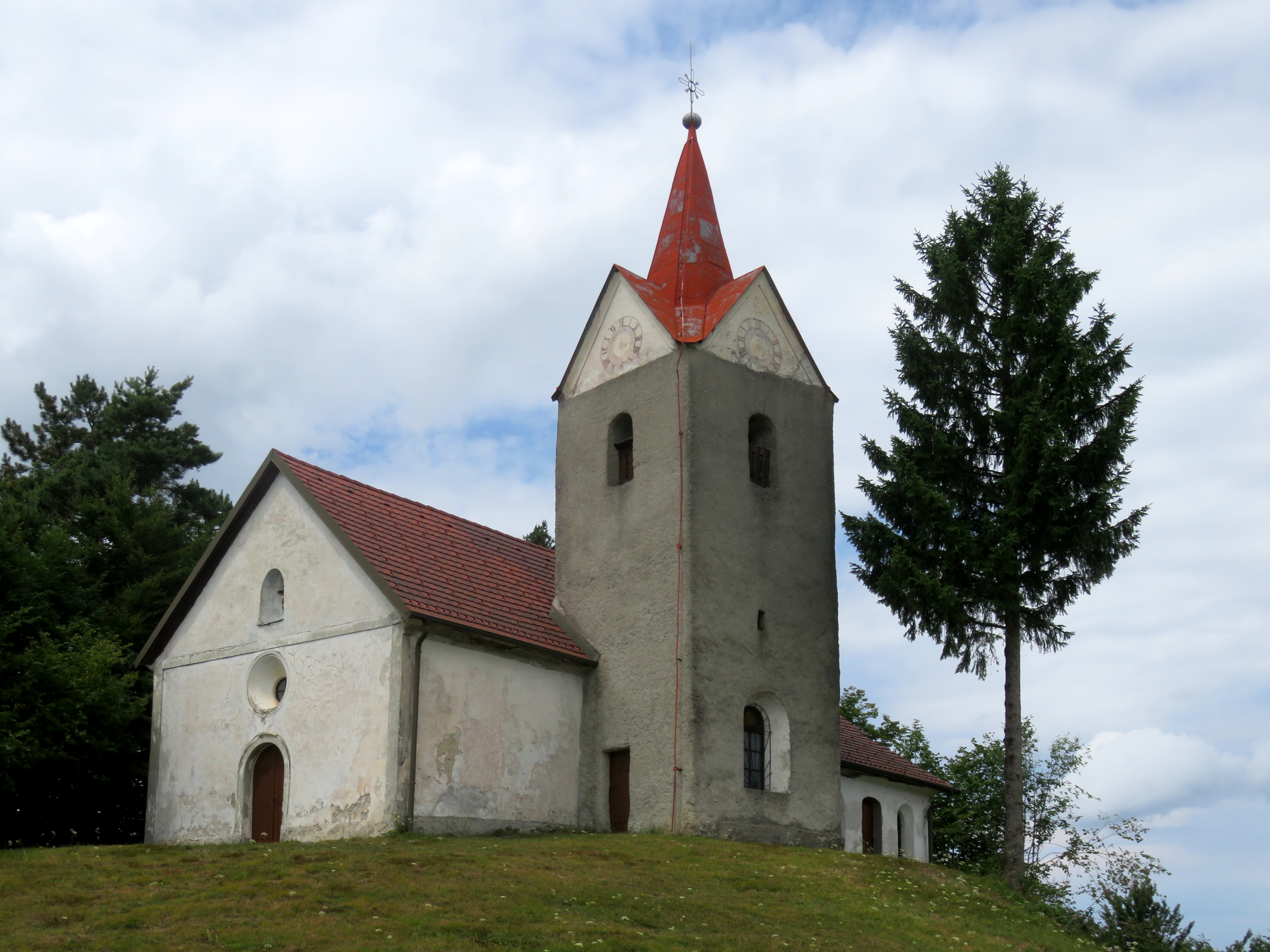
Saints John and Paul Church

The local church is dedicated to Saints John and Paul and belongs to the Parish of Dole pri Litiji. It is a simple Baroque church, dating to the 18th century.
