= Emerita =

Emerita may refer to:

- Emerita (crustacean), a genus of crustaceans
- Emerita Augusta, an ancient city of Spain
- Saint Emerita, 3rd-century martyr; see Digna and Emerita
- Emerita, the feminine form of the adjective "emeritus", added to the title professor or religious leader to honor them for lengthy service
