= Santi Giovanni e Paolo al Celio =

Roman Catholic basilica, a landmark of Rome, Italy

- Basilica of Saints John and Paul on the Caelian Hill
- Basilica dei Santi Giovanni e Paolo
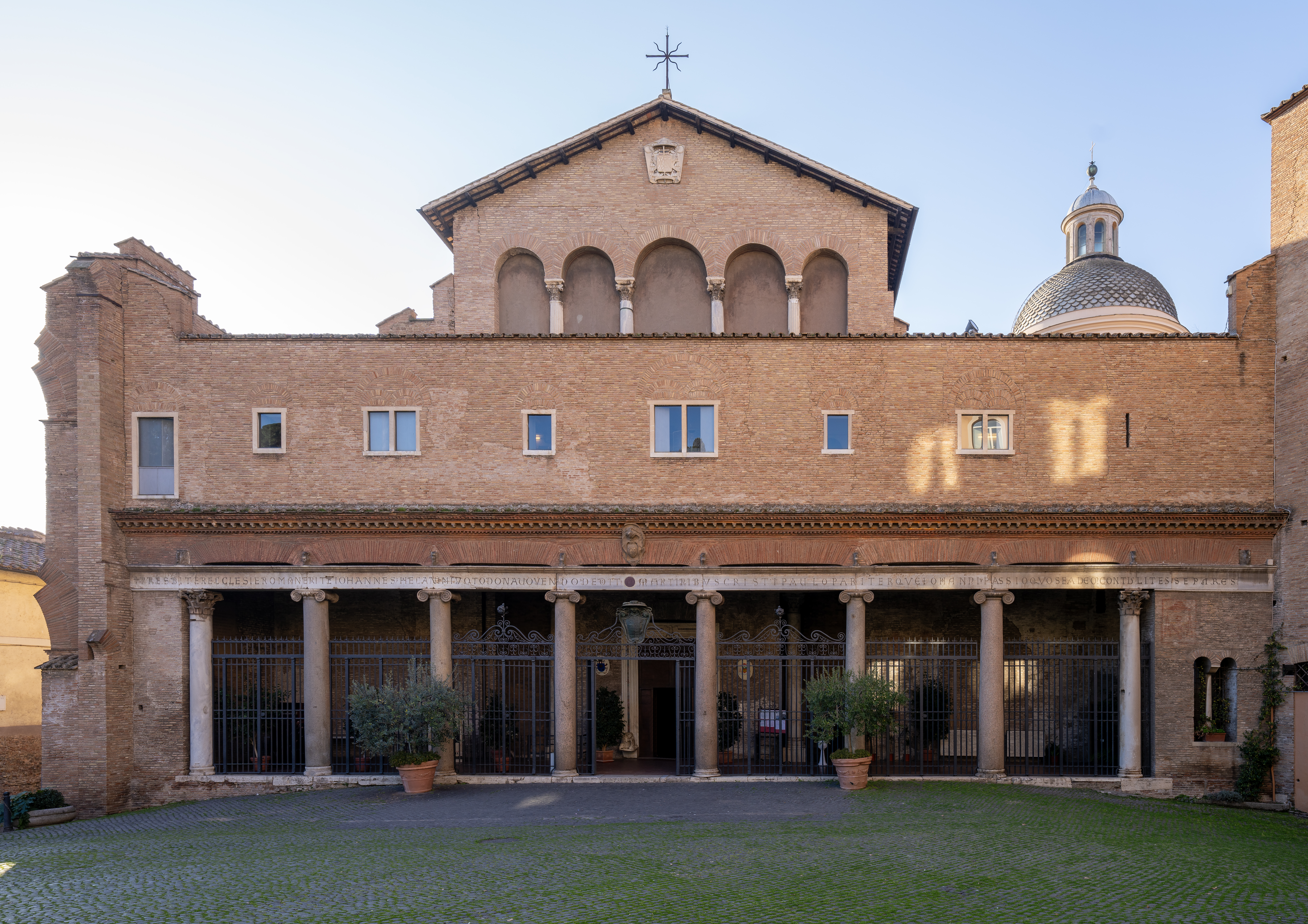
- Exterior view
- Click on the map for a fullscreen view
- 41.88627°N 12.49266°E
- Location: Piazza Dei SS. Giovanni e Paolo, Rome
- Country: Italy
- Language: Italian
- Denomination: Catholic
- Tradition: Roman Rite
- Religious order: Passionist
- Website: basilicassgiovanniepaolo.it

History
- Status: titular church, minor basilica
- Founded: AD 398
- Founder: Saint Pammachius
- Dedication: John and Paul (4th century martyrs)

Architecture
- Architectural type: Paleochristian, Baroque
- Completed: 1951

Administration
- Diocese: Rome

The Basilica of Saints John and Paul on the Caelian Hill (Italian: Basilica dei Santi Giovanni e Paolo al Celio) is an ancient basilica church in Rome, located on the Caelian Hill. It was originally built in 398.

It is home to the Passionists and is the burial place of St. Paul of the Cross. Additionally, it is the station church of the first Friday in Lent.

== History ==
The church was built in 398, by senator Pammachius, over the home of two Roman soldiers, John and Paul, martyred under Emperor Julian in 362. The church was thus called the Titulus Pammachii and is recorded as such in the acts of the synod held by Pope Symmachus in 499.

The church was damaged during the sack by Alaric I (410) and because of an earthquake (442), restored by Pope Paschal I (824), sacked again by the Normans (1084), and again restored, with the addition of a monastery and a bell tower around 1099.

== Interior ==
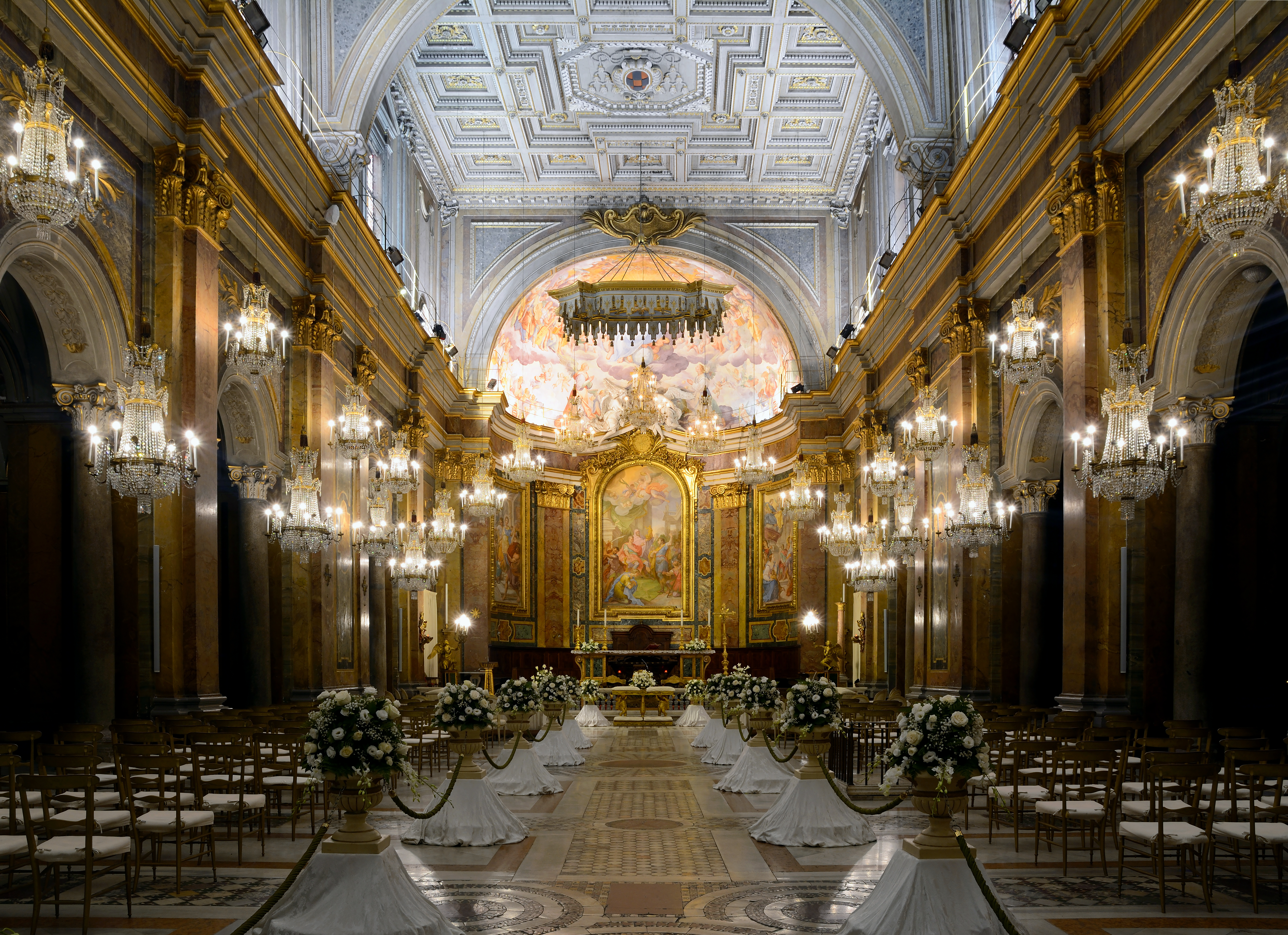
Interior

The inside has three naves, with pillars joined to the original columns. The altar is built over a bath, which holds the remains of the two martyrs. The apse is frescoed with Christ in Glory (1588) by Cristoforo Roncalli (one of the painters called il Pomarancio); while below this fresco are three paintings: a Martyrdom of St John, a Martyrdom of St Paul, and the Conversion of Terenziano (1726) by Giovanni Domenico Piastrini, Giacomo Triga, and Pietro Andrea Barbieri respectively.

The sacristy features a canvas by Antoniazzo Romano of the Madonna and Child with Saints John the Evangelist and John the Baptist, and Saints Jerome and Paul.

== Cardinalatial title ==
The basilica is connected with the cardinalatial Titulus Ss. Ioannis et Pauli. Among previous Cardinal Priests of this title are three who became Pope: Pope Honorius III (Cencio Savelli, elevated to cardinal in 1198), Pope Adrian VI (Adriaan Boeyens, elevated to cardinal in 1517) and Pope Pius XII (Eugenio Pacelli, elevated to cardinal in 1929).
Since Francis Spellman became the new Cardinal Priest of the titulus in 1946 (after it had been vacated by Pacelli's election to the papacy in 1939), it was held until 2015 by cardinals who were Archbishops of New York. In 2012, Archbishop Timothy Dolan of New York was elevated to cardinal and assigned a different title, because Cardinal Edward Egan, the first prelate to enjoy the title of Archbishop Emeritus of New York, continued in the title of Ss. Ioannis et Pauli until his death on 5 March 2015.
The title is now held by Cardinal Josef De Kesel, the Archbishop of Mechelen-Brussels, who was appointed to it on 19 November 2016.

=== List of Cardinal-Priests since 1200 ===
- Cencio Savelli (1200–1216), later Pope Honorius III.
- Pedro Rodríguez (1302–1310)
- Bertrand des Bordes (1310–1311)
- Jacques de Via (1316–1317)
- Matteo Orsini OP (1327–1338)
- Etienne Aubert (1342–1352), later Pope Innocent VI
- Andouin Aubert (1353–1361)
- Guillaume de la Sudrie OP (1366–1367)
- Simone Brossano (1375–1381)
- Gautier Gómez de Luna (1382–1391), Pseudocardinal
- Jean Flandrin (1391–1405), Pseudocardinal
- Tommaso Brancaccio (1411–1427), Pseudocardinal
- vacant (1427–1430)
- Domingo Ram y Lanaja (1430–1444)
- Latino Orsini (1448–1465)
- Philibert Hugonet (1477–1484)
- vacant (1484–1489)
- Ardicino della Porta, iuniore (1489–1493)
- Giambattista Orsini (1493–1503)
- Francesco de Remolins (1503–1511); in commendam (1511–1517)
- Adriaan Florenszoon Dedel van Utrecht (1517–1522), later Pope Adrian VI
- Willem van Enckevoirt (1523–1534)
- Esteban Gabriel Merino (1534–1535)
- Afonso de Portugal (1535–1540)
- Pedro Fernández Manrique (1540)
- Federico de Campo Fregoso (1541)
- Pierre de la Baume Montrevel (1541–1544)
- Georges d'Armagnac (1545–1556)
- Fabio Mignanelli (1556–1557)
- Antonio Trivulzio (1557–1559)
- Alfonso Carafa (1560–1565)
- Gabriele Paleotti (1565–1572) (Cardinal dean)
- Nicolas de Pellevé (1572–1584)
- Antonio Carafa (1584–1591)
- Alessandro Ottaviano de Medici (1591–1592), later Pope Leo XI
- Giovanni Battista Castrucci (1592–1595)
- Agostino Cusani (1595–1598)
- Camillo Borghese (1599–1602), later Pope Paul V
- Ottavio Acquaviva d’Aragona (1602–1605)
- Pietro Aldobrandini (1605–1612)
- Decio Carafa (1612–1626)
- Carlo Emmanuele Pio di Savoia (1626)
- Lorenzo Magalotti (1628–1637)
- vacant (1637–1642)
- Francesco Maria Macchiavelli (1642–1653)
- Giberto Borromeo (1654–1672)
- Giacomo Rospigliosi (1672–1684)
- Fortunato Carafa (1687–1697)
- Fabrizio Paolucci (1699–1719)
- vacant (1719–1726)
- Niccolò Maria Lercari (1726–1743)
- Camillo Paolucci (1746–1756); in commendam (1756–1763)
- Giovanni Carlo Boschi (1766–1784)
- Giuseppe Garampi (1786–1792)
- Aurelio Roverella (1794–1809)
- vacant (1809–1816)
- Antonio Lamberto Rusconi (1816–1825)
- Vincenzo Macchi (1827–1840)
- Cosimo Corsi (1842–1870)
- vacant (1870–1874)
- Mariano Benito Barrio y Fernández (1874–1876)
- Edward Henry Howard (1877–1884)
- Placido Maria Schiaffino (1885–1889)
- Franziskus von Paula Graf von Schönborn (1889–1899)
- Giuseppe Francica-Nava de Bontifè (1899–1928)
- Eugenio Pacelli (1929–1939), later Pope Pius XII
- Francis Spellman (1946–1967)
- Terence Cooke (1969–1983)
- John Joseph O’Connor (1985–2000)
- Edward Michael Egan (2001–2015)
- Jozef De Kesel (2016–)

== Excavations ==
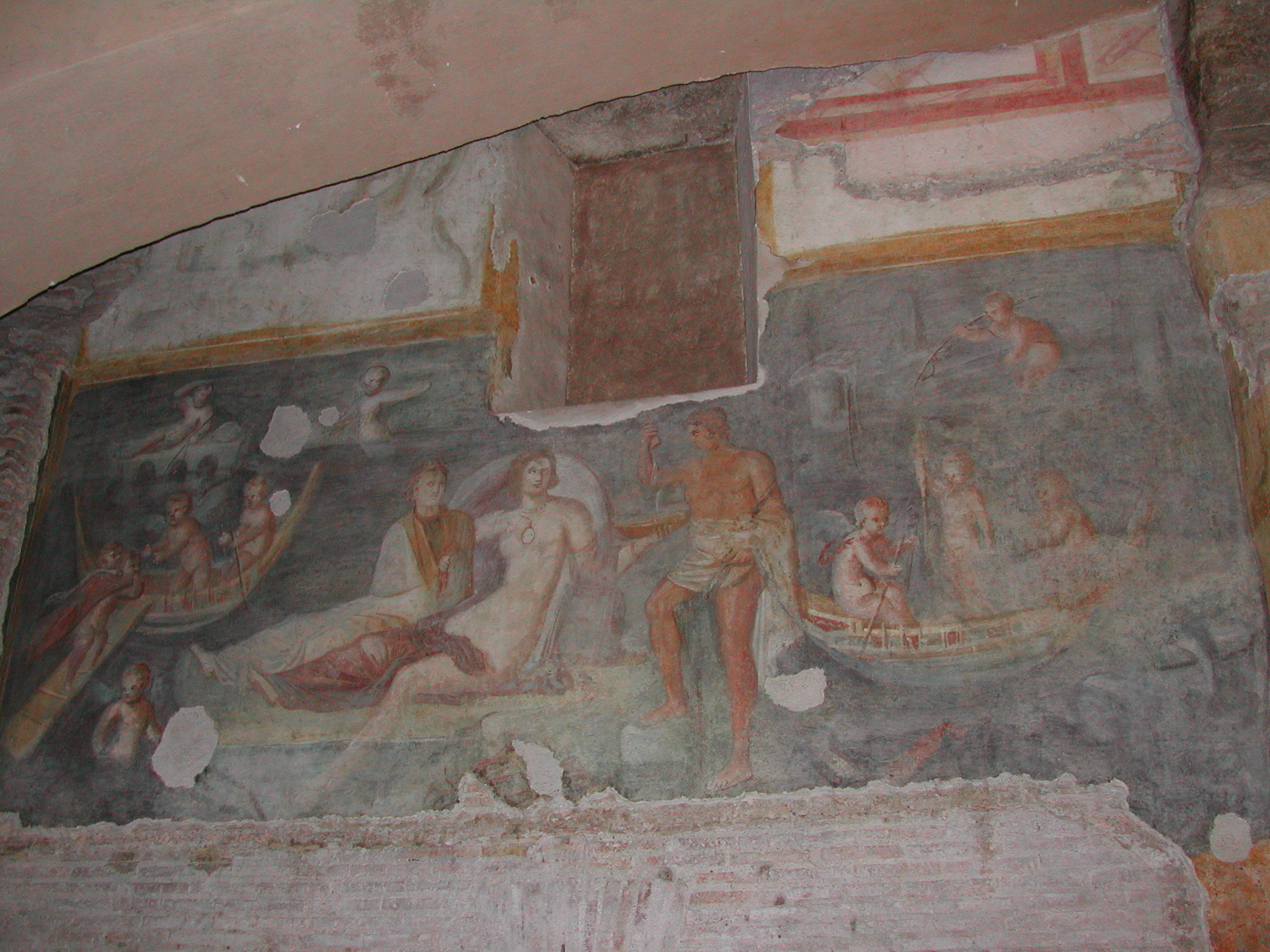
A fresco in the Roman rooms

During excavations performed in the 19th century, a series of Ancient Roman rooms were discovered under the nave of the church. Some of these rooms date back to the first and fourth centuries AD. According to the writer Charlotte Anne Eaton, these rooms were dens that were part of a vivarium in which wild animals were kept before being used in entertainments held at the Colosseum. A low vaulted passage connected this vivarium with the Colosseum.

The underground sites of the basilica were discovered in 1887 by Father Germano da San Stanislao, who at the time was rector of the Basilica, and was searching for the tombs of the martyrs John and Paul. He found twenty decorated rooms belonging to at least five different buildings dated between the first and the fourth century AD. These five buildings comprise one of the best conserved Roman era residential building complexes still in existence today, and one of the best examples of a domus ecclesiae ("house church"). The original frescoes can still be seen, with scenes of the martyrdom. The houses are accessed outside the church on the Clivus Scauri.

In one room, which was a nymphaeum courtyard, an elegant third-century AD fresco depicting Proserpine and other divinities among cherubs in a boat (3 m × 5 m (9.8 ft × 16.4 ft)) can be found, as can traces of another marine fresco and mosaics in the window arches. Between the third and the fourth century AD, some modifications were made to the rooms, and a sort of oratory was made, with Christian-themed frescoes, while in the other rooms the decorations did not specifically have Christian themes (winged genies, garlands, birds, etc.). A confessio was also built in the fourth century AD in a passageway behind the Clivus Scauri. The walls of the confessio were frescoed with Christian themes (e.g., the beheading of Saints Crispus, Crispinus, and Benedicta, female figures and an orante or "person in prayer").

== Bibliography ==
- Mariano Armellini, Le Chiese di Roma, dalle loro origini sino al secolo XVI (Roma: Tipografia editrice Romana 1887), pp. 276–281.
- Germano Di San Stanislao, La Casa Celimontana dei SS. Martiri Giovanni E Paolo (Roma: Tipografia della pace di F. Cuggiani, 1894).
- Stanislao Dell'Addolorata, La Basilica Celimontana dei Santi Giovanni e Paolo (Roma: Bucciarelli, 1930).
- Istituto di studi romani, SS. Giovanni e Paolo al Celio (Roma : Tip. Centenari, 1956) [Chiese di Roma, cenni religiosi, storici, artistici, 70].
- Adriano Prandi and G Ferrari,The Basilica of Saints John and Paul on the Caelian Hill: After the Restorations and Archaeological Explorations Promoted by His Eminence, Francis Cardinal Spellman, Archbishop of New York and Cardinal Titular of the Basilica (Roma 1958).
- Gioacchino Alberto De Sanctis, I Santi Giovanni e Paolo, martiri celimontani (Isola del Liri (FR) : Pisani, M., 1962).
- Bianca Maria Margarucci Italiani, Il titolo di Pammachio, Santi Giovanni e Paolo (Roma: Postulazione Gen. dei PP. Passionisti, 1985).
- Alia Englen, Case romane e Antiquarium: sotto la Basilica dei SS. Giovanni e Paolo al Celio : guida breve (Roma: L' 'Erma' di Bretschneider 2004).

Preceded by San Giovanni dei Fiorentini	Landmarks of Rome; Santi Giovanni e Paolo al Celio	Succeeded by San Lorenzo in Damaso
