= Jelenska Reber =

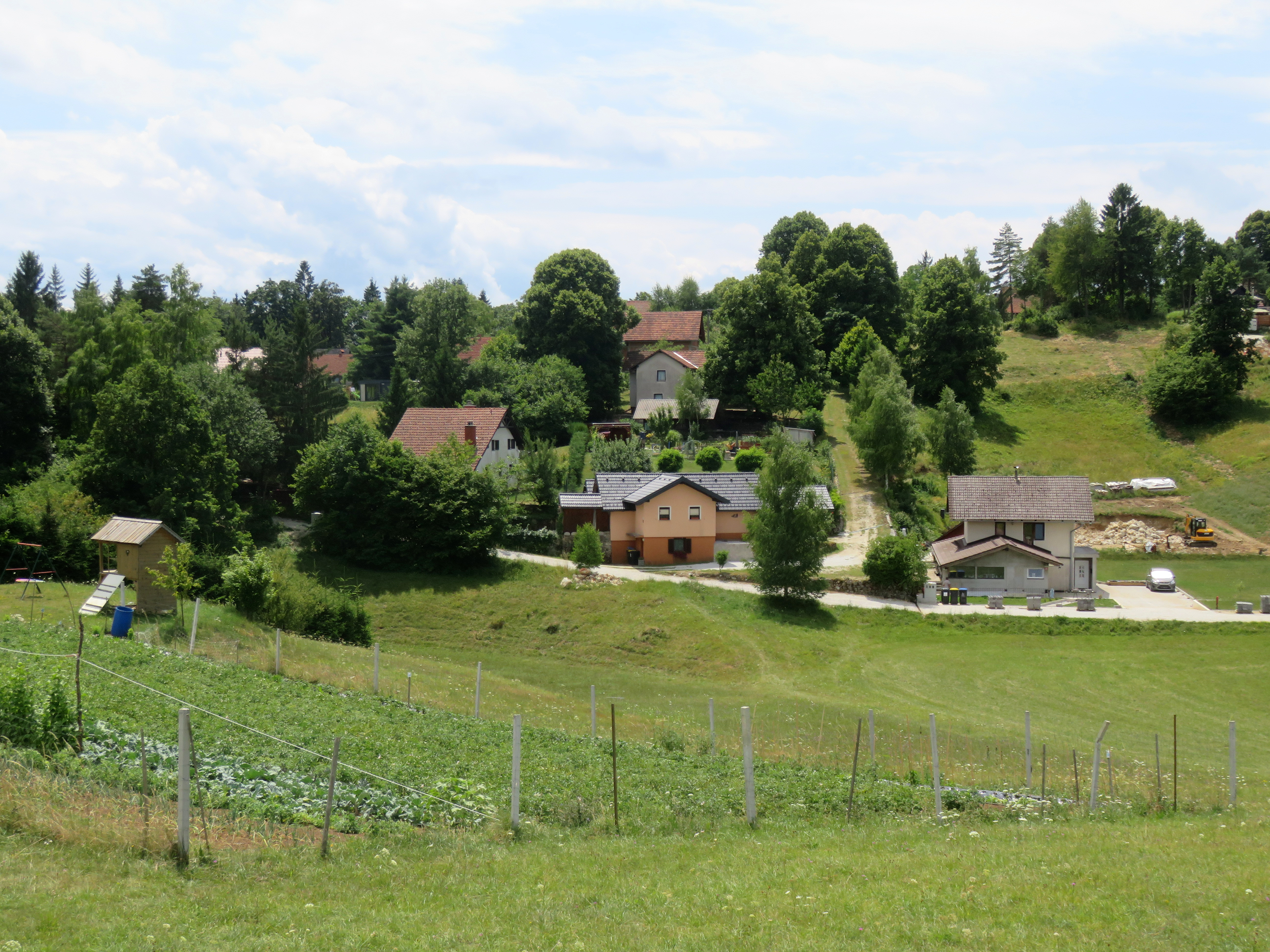

- Location in Slovenia
- Coordinates: 46°2′20.24″N 15°0′43.71″E
- Country: Slovenia
- Traditional region: Lower Carniola
- Statistical region: Central Sava
- Municipality: Litija

Area
  - Total: 0.76 km^{2} (0.29 sq mi)
- Elevation: 750.9 m (2,464 ft)

Population (2002)
  - Total: 21
- Postal code: 1273

Jelenska Reber (pronounced [jɛˈleːnska ˈɾeːbəɾ]) is a settlement northwest of Dole pri Litiji in the Municipality of Litija in central Slovenia. The area is part of the traditional region of Lower Carniola. It is now included with the rest of the municipality in the Central Sava Statistical Region; until January 2014 the municipality was part of the Central Slovenia Statistical Region.

== Name ==
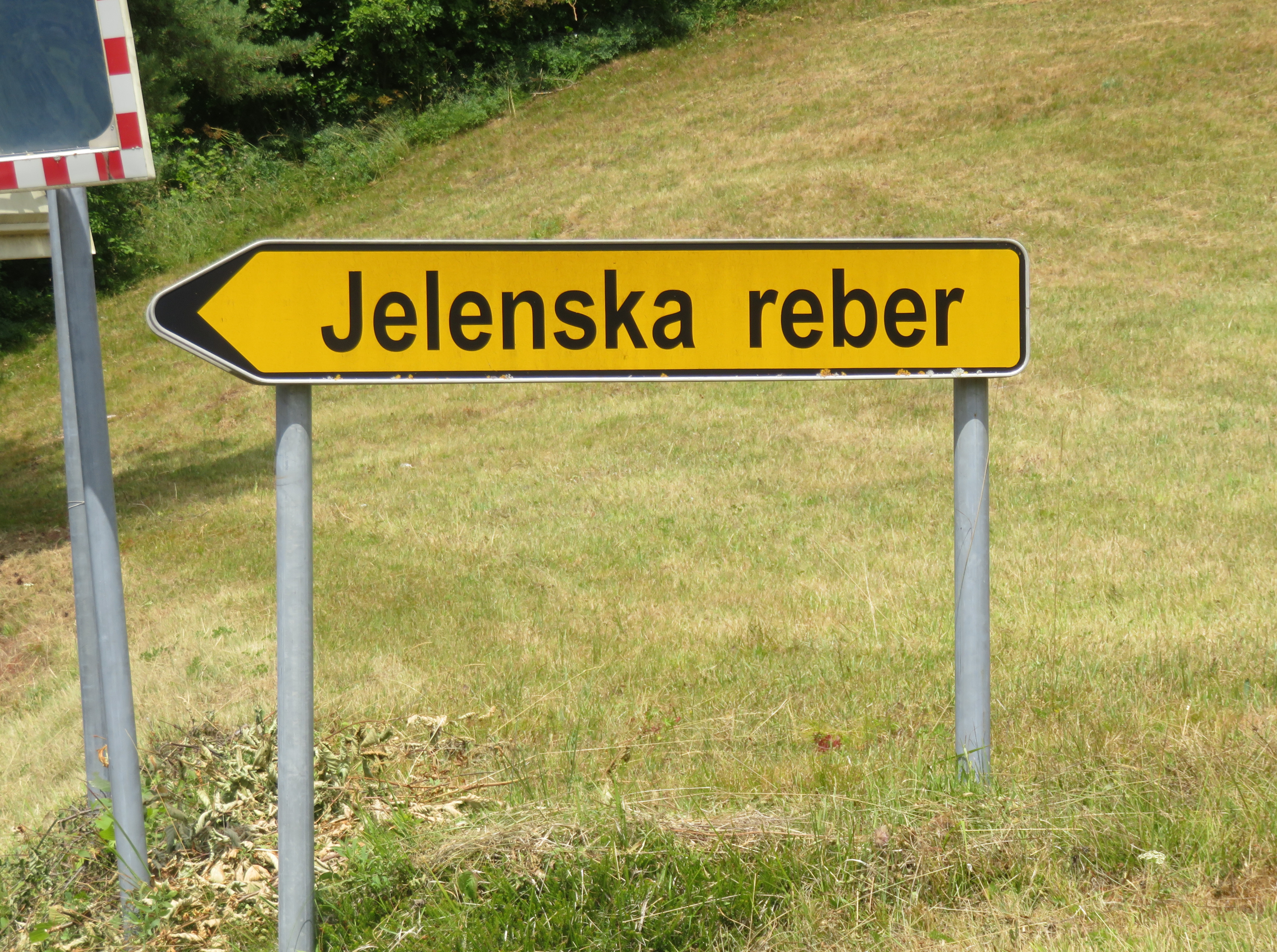
Sign for Jelenska Reber

The name Jelenska Reber literally means 'deer ridge', derived from the common noun jelen 'deer'. Together with Gorenje Jelenje and Spodnje Jelenje, the name is believed to refer to a deer park that the castle lords in the Central Sava Valley maintained for hunting in the area.

== History ==
Jelenska Reber was a hamlet of Dole pri Litiji until 1995, when it became a separate settlement.
