= Dobje, Litija =

Dobje
- Location in Slovenia
- Coordinates: 46°1′35.11″N 15°4′57.12″E
- Country: Slovenia
- Traditional region: Lower Carniola
- Statistical region: Central Sava
- Municipality: Litija

Area
  - Total: 0.75 km^{2} (0.29 sq mi)
- Elevation: 696.5 m (2,285 ft)

Population (2015)
  - Total: 8
- Postal code: 1273

Dobje (pronounced [ˈdoːbjɛ]) is a small settlement in the Municipality of Litija in central Slovenia. Relatively remote, the area is part of the traditional region of Lower Carniola and is now included, along with the rest of the municipality, in the Central Sava Statistical Region.

== History ==
Dobje was a hamlet of Ježevec until 1995, when it was made a separate settlement.
