= Spodnje Jelenje =

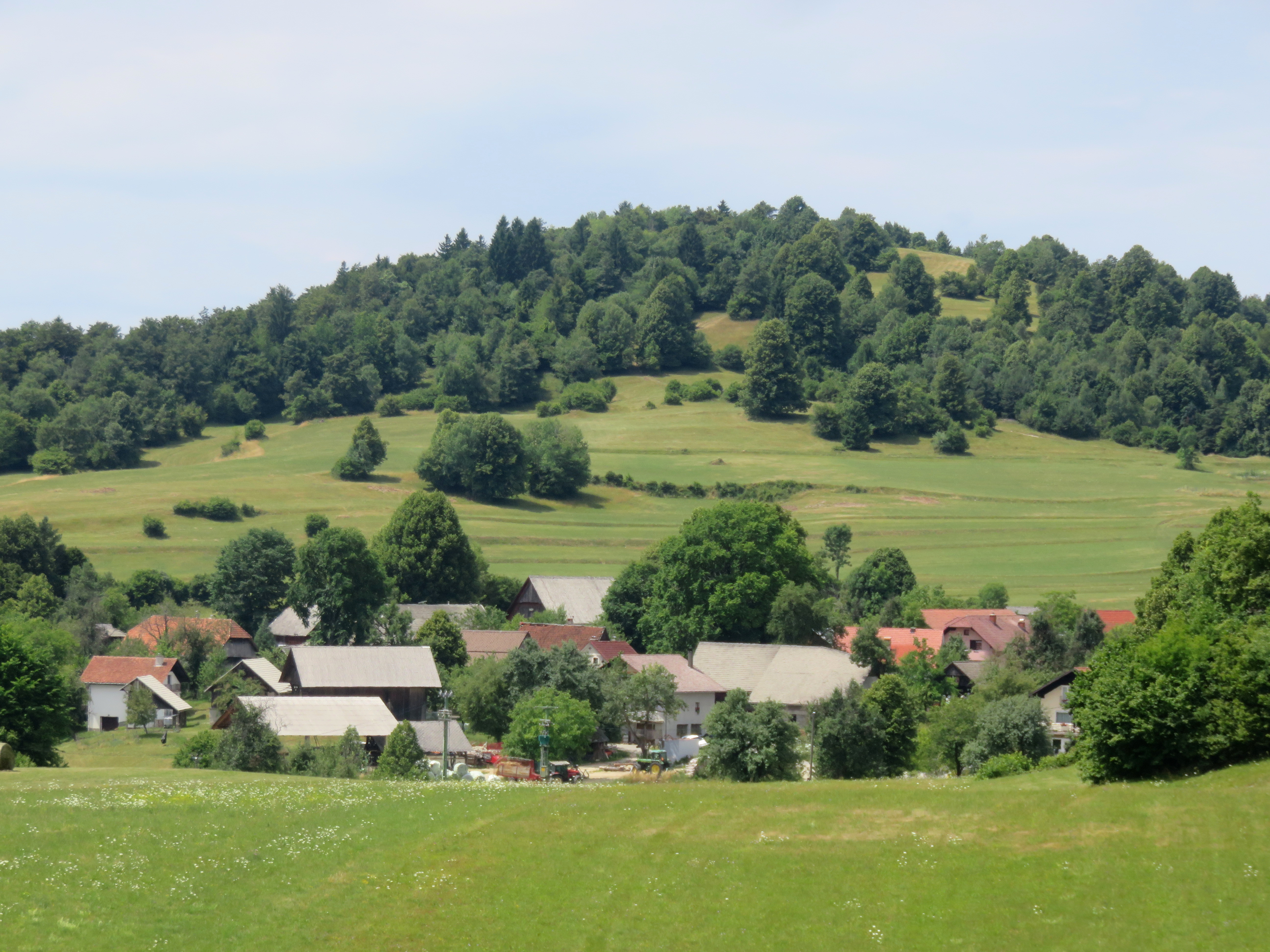

- Location in Slovenia
- Coordinates: 46°2′34.49″N 15°0′15.33″E
- Country: Slovenia
- Traditional region: Lower Carniola
- Statistical region: Central Sava
- Municipality: Litija

Area
  - Total: 0.67 km^{2} (0.26 sq mi)
- Elevation: 729.5 m (2,393 ft)

Population (2002)
  - Total: 30
- Postal code: 1273

Spodnje Jelenje (pronounced [ˈspoːdnjɛ jɛˈleːnjɛ]; in older sources also Dolenje Jelenje, German: Unterjeline) is a small settlement northwest of Dole pri Litiji in the Municipality of Litija in central Slovenia. The area is part of the traditional region of Lower Carniola and is now included with the rest of the municipality in the Central Sava Statistical Region.

== Name ==
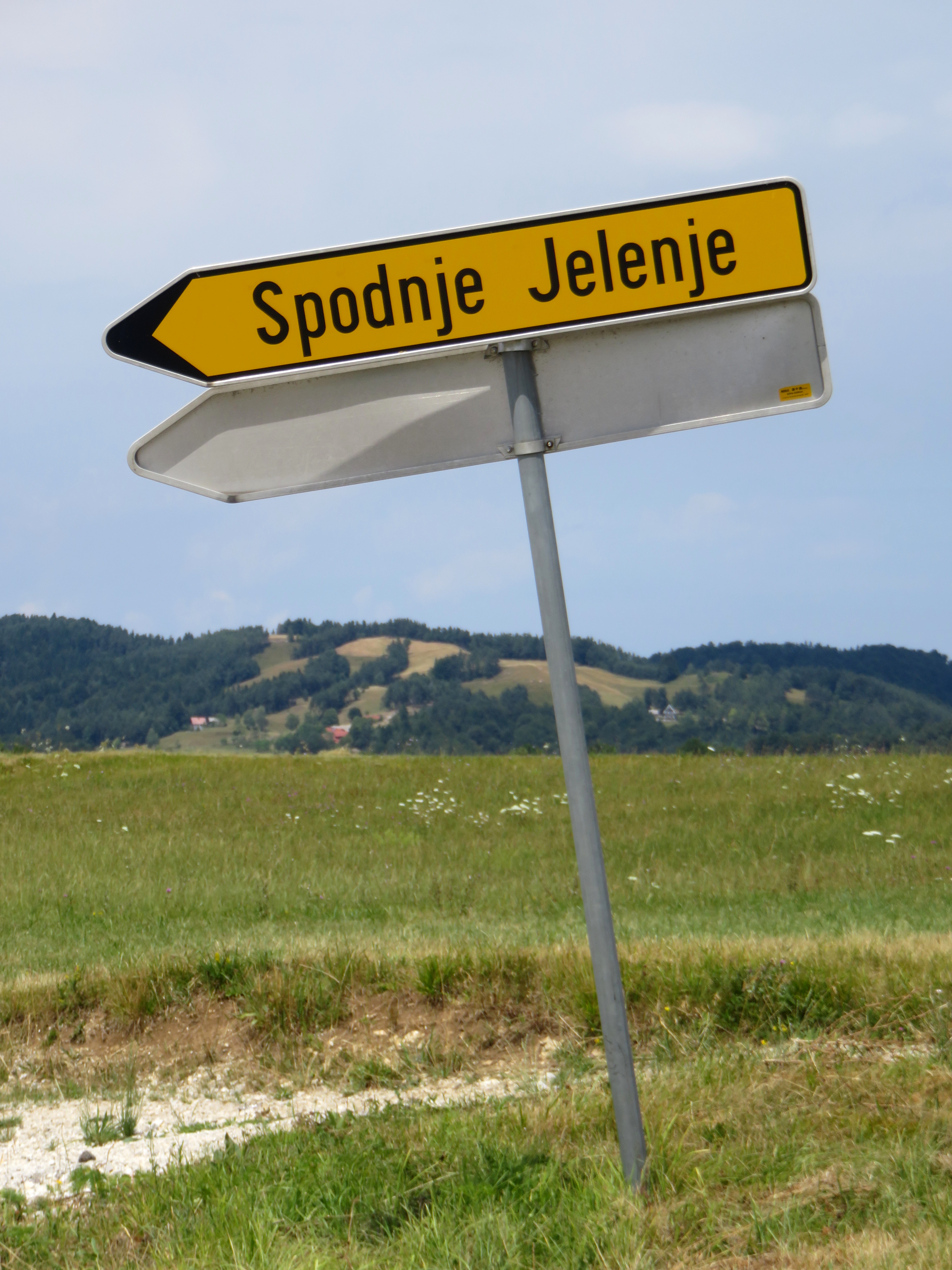
Sign for Spodnje Jelenje

The name Spodnje Jelenje literally means 'lower Jelenje'; it lies about 37 meters (121 ft) lower in elevation than neighboring Gorenje Jelenje (literally, 'upper Jelenje'). Spodnje Jelenje was attested in historical sources together with Gorenje Jelenje as Hiersueld in 1406 and Hirsveld in 1419, and separately as Nidernhirsueld in 1444 and Nyder Hyrssenueld in 1445, among other variations. The name is derived from the common noun jelen 'deer'. Together with Jelenska Reber, the names of these villages are believed to refer to a deer park that the castle lords in the Central Sava Valley maintained for hunting in the area.
