= Giovanni Francesco de Orsini =

16th-century Italian bishop

Most Reverend Giovanni Francesco de Orsini
- Bishop of Bitonto
- Church: Catholic Church
- Diocese: Diocese of Bitonto
- In office: 1501–1517
- Predecessor: Giovanni Battista Orsini
- Successor: Giulio de' Medici

Giovanni Francesco de Orsini was a Roman Catholic prelate who served as Bishop of Bitonto (1501–1517).

== Biography ==
On 20 December 1501, during the papacy of Pope Alexander VI, Giovanni Battista Orsini was appointed Bishop of Bitonto He served as Bishop of Bitonto until his resignation in 1517 replacing his uncle, Cardinal Giovanni Battista Orsini, who served as administrator. Some sources list his name as Giovanni Battista Orsini, iuniore (the junior), the name of his uncle.

== External links and additional sources ==
- Cheney, David M. "Diocese of Bitonto". Catholic-Hierarchy.org. (for Chronology of Bishops)
- Chow, Gabriel. "Diocese of Bitonto (Italy)". GCatholic.org. (for Chronology of Bishops)

Catholic Church titles
Preceded by Giovanni Battista Orsini	Bishop of Bitonto; 1501–1517	Succeeded by Giulio de' Medici
