= Prelesje, Litija =

Prelesje
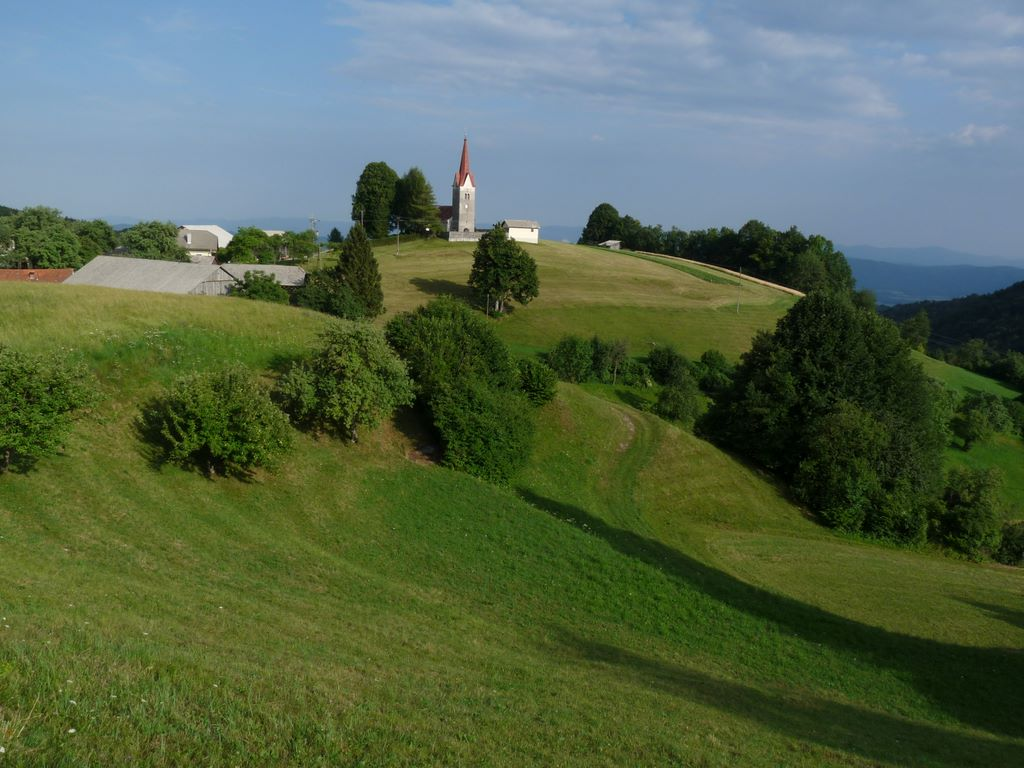
- St. Lawrence's Church in Prelesje

- Location in Slovenia
- Coordinates: 46°1′55.21″N 15°4′27.39″E
- Country: Slovenia
- Traditional region: Lower Carniola
- Statistical region: Central Sava
- Municipality: Litija

Area
  - Total: 1.6 km^{2} (0.62 sq mi)
- Elevation: 774.6 m (2,541 ft)

Population (2002)
  - Total: 24
- Postal code: 1273

Prelesje (pronounced [pɾɛˈleːsjɛ]) is a small settlement east of Dole in the Municipality of Litija in central Slovenia. The area is part of the traditional region of Lower Carniola. It is now included with the rest of the municipality in the Central Sava Statistical Region.

The local church is dedicated to Saint Lawrence and belongs to the Parish of Dole pri Litiji. It was built in the early 18th century.
