= Giuseppe Garampi =

Italian scholar (1725–1792)

His Eminence Giuseppe Garampi
- Cardinal-Priest of Santi Giovanni e Paolo
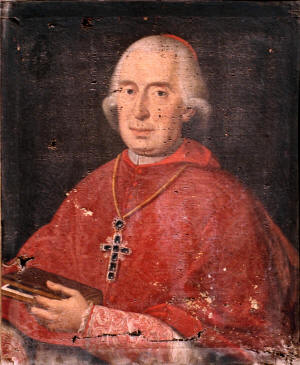
- Church: Catholic Church
- Appointed: 3 April 1786
- Term ended: 4 May 1792
- Predecessor: Giovanni Carlo Boschi
- Successor: Aurelio Roverella
- Previous posts: Apostolic Nuncio to Poland (1772–1776); Apostolic Nuncio to Austria (1776–1785)

Orders
- Ordination: 31 March 1749
- Consecration: 9 February 1772 by Lazzaro Opizio Pallavicino
- Created cardinal: 14 February 1785 by Pope Pius VI
- Rank: Cardinal-Priest

Personal details
- Born: 29 October 1725 Rimini, Italy
- Died: 4 May 1792 (aged 66) Rome, Papal States
- Buried: Santi Giovanni e Paolo al Celio

Giuseppe Garampi (29 October 1725 – 4 May 1792) was an Italian scholar and collector of documents and books.

== Biography ==
He was born in Rimini, the son of Count Lorenzo Garampi, a patrician of the city of Rimini. As a youth he studied in Rimini under the preceptorship of the naturalist Janus Plancus (Giovanni Bianchi). When Rimini was invaded by foreign armies, however, he went to Florence, where he became a follower of Johannes Lamius. He then went to Modena, where he became acquainted with Ludovico Antonio Muratori, the antiquarian and historian. He returned to Rimini, in 1741, where he continued his antiquarian and historical researches, working in the Biblioteca Gambalunga. In 1745 he became a member of the Accademia dei Lincei, whose branch at Rimini had been refounded by Janus Plancus. Garampi turned to an ecclesiastical career, taking minor Holy Orders in Rimini in 1746.

He then decided to seek a wider and more remunerative field for his talents in Rome. In September 1747, he was ordained a Subdeacon, and then a Deacon, and on 31 March 1749 he was ordained a priest.

In 1749, at the age of twenty-four, he published in Rome a numismatic and historical treatise on Pope Benedict III (855–858), which drew him to the attention of the scholarly community attached to the papal court, including Pope Benedict XIV himself.

He served as Prefect of the Archives from 1751 until 1772, during which time he compiled the Schedario Garampi, a massive card index for the Vatican Secret Archives. Although never completed, it is still in use. A few weeks after his appointment as Archivist, on 20 October 1752, Garampi was appointed a Canon of the Vatican Basilica by Pope Benedict XIV.

On 16 January 1772, Garampi was granted the degree Doctor in utroque iure by Pope Clement XIV by means of an apostolic rescript. On 27 January 1772, Garampi was appointed titular Archbishop of Berytus (Beirut, Lebanon); he was consecrated on 9 February by Cardinal Lazzaro Opizio Pallavicini. On 20 March 1772, he was appointed papal Nuncio to the King of Poland, Stanisław August Poniatowski. He served as Nuncio until October 1775.

He was appointed papal Nuncio in Vienna, from 16 March 1776 to 1785. On 20 May 1776, Pope Pius V transferred him from the titular diocese of Berytus to the diocese of Corneto e Montefiascone (1776–1792), allowing him to retain the title of archbishop.

Pope Pius VI named him a Cardinal in the consistory of 14 February 1785, and on 3 April 1786 appointed him to the Titular church of Ss. Giovanni e Paolo.

On 20 August 1790, Garampi was named protector of the German college in Rome.

He died in Rome at the German College on 4 May 1792, and was buried temporarily in the church of S. Apollinare. On 16 November 1792, the remains were taken to Ss. Giovanni e Paolo for permanent entombment.

== Sources ==
- Dell'Orto, Umberto; Metzler, Josef (1995). La Nunziatura a Vienna Di Giuseppe Garampi, 1776-1785 (in Italian). Citta del Vaticano: Archivio Vaticano. ISBN 978-88-85042-26-1.
- Dengel, Ignaz Philipp (1905). Die politische und kirchliche Tätigkeit des Monsignor Josef Garampi in Deutschland 1761-1763 (in German). Rome: Loescher.
- Dengel, Ignaz Philipp (1903). "Nuntius Josef G. in Preussisch Schlesien und in Sachsen im Jahre 1776. Bericht über seine Reise von Warschau über Breslau nach Dresden," in: Quellen und Forschungen aus Italienischen Archiven und Bibliotheken (in German). Vol. V. 1903. pp. 223–268.
- Frioli, Donatella (1986). I codici del Cardinale Garampi nella Biblioteca Gambalunghiana di Rimini. Collana di "storie e storia", 5. (in Italian). Rimini: Maggioli. ISBN 9788838798313.
- Vanysacker, Dries (1995). Cardinal Giuseppe Garampi, 1725-1792: An Enlightened Ultramontane. Bibliothèque de l'Institut historique belge de Rome, fasc. 33. Bruxelles: Institut historique belge de Rome. ISBN 978-90-74461-13-9.
- Walsh, Michael J. (2011). The Cardinals: Thirteen Centuries of the Men Behind the Papal Throne. Cambridge UK: Eerdmans Publishing Company. pp. 89–92. ISBN 978-0-8028-2941-2.
