= Vivarium (Rome) =

A vivarium was an enclosure where the ancient Romans kept wild animals used for hunts or other types of entertainments, for example in amphitheatres.

In Rome, one was near the Prenestina Gate.

According to one source, a second, smaller vivarium was located near the Colosseum below the convent of St. John and St. Paul on the Cœlian Mount and was connected to it via a low vaulted passage. This vivarium was a practical necessity because of the considerable distance between the vivarium by Porta Maggiore and the Colosseum.
