= Strmec, Litija =

Strmec
- Location in Slovenia
- Coordinates: 46°1′12.14″N 15°4′12.92″E
- Country: Slovenia
- Traditional region: Lower Carniola
- Statistical region: Central Sava
- Municipality: Litija

Area
  - Total: 3.2 km^{2} (1.2 sq mi)
- Elevation: 685.1 m (2,248 ft)

Population (2002)
  - Total: 43
- Postal code: 1273

Strmec (pronounced [ˈstəɾməts]) is a small settlement to the east of Dole pri Litiji in the Municipality of Litija in central Slovenia. The area is part of the traditional region of Lower Carniola and is now included with the rest of the municipality in the Central Sava Statistical Region.

To the north of the settlement remains of an Early Iron Age hillfort and an associated tumulus burial ground have been identified.
