= Digna and Emerita =

Catholic saints

Saints Digna and Emerita
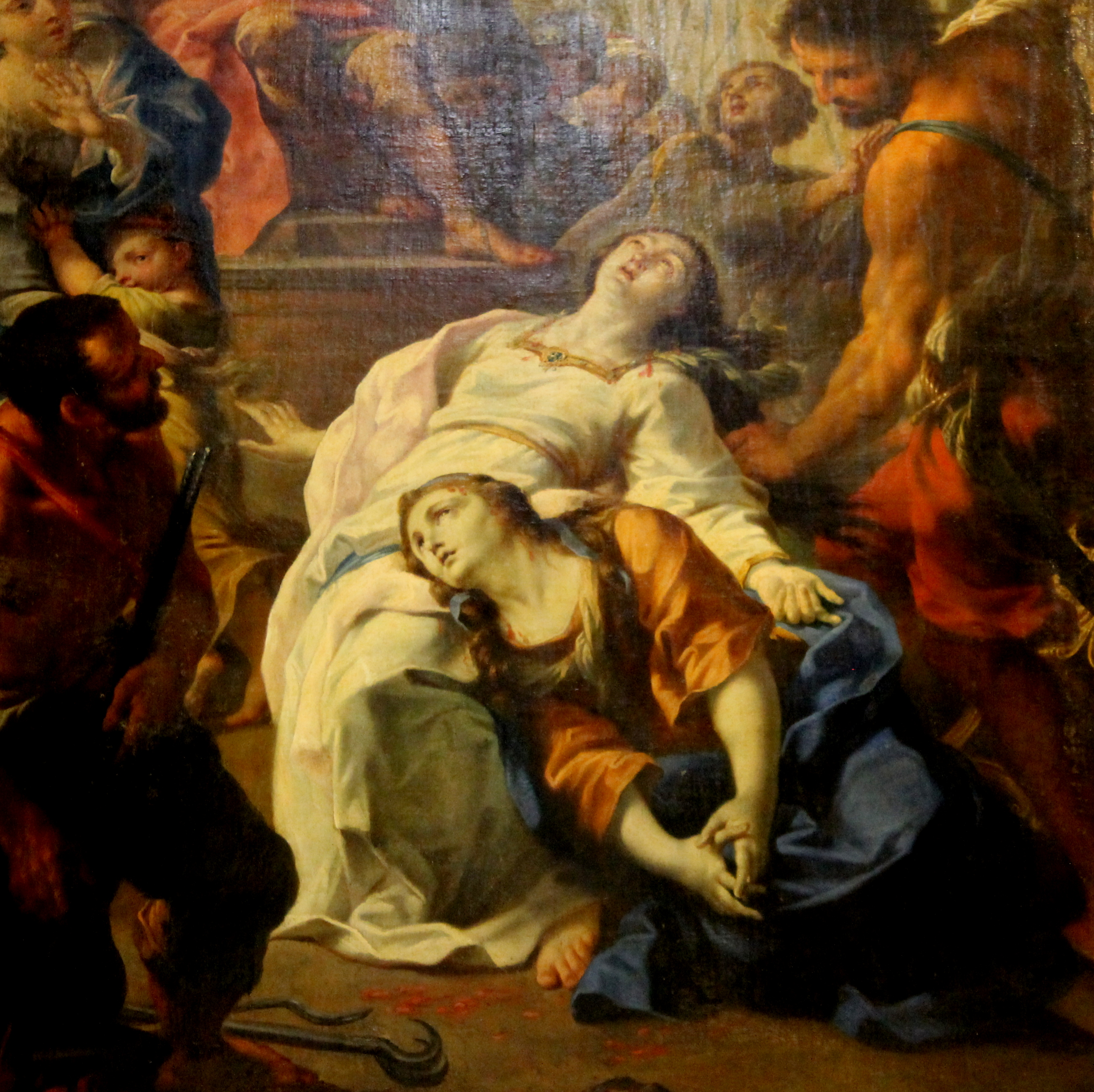
- Detail of the altarpiece of the Chapel of Saints Digna and Emerita in the Church of San Marcello al Corso in Rome, by Pietro Andrea Barbieri Pucciardi (1727)
- Died: 259 AD
- Venerated in: Catholic Church
- Major shrine: San Marcello al Corso
- Feast: September 22

Digna and Emerita (died 259 AD) are venerated as saints by the Catholic Church. They were Roman maidens seized and put to the torture as Christians in the persecution of Valerian (A.D. 254-A.D. 259) at Rome.

In the catacombs of the Commodilla there was the grave of an Emerita. Around 757 it was discovered under Pope Paul I, who had the relics transferred to the church of San Marcello al Corso, in Rome. On the basis of a misunderstood inscription, the bones were considered for the two martyrs and around the middle of the 9th martyrs. a legend formed of two martyrs similar to the story of Saint Afra.

It is recorded that on April 5, 838, a monk named Felix appeared at Fulda with the remains of Saints Cornelius, Callistus, Agapitus, Georgius, Vincentius, Maximus, Cecilia, Eugenia, Digna, Emerita, and Columbana.

Their feast day is celebrated on September 22.
