= Crispus, Crispinianus, and Benedicta =

Saints Crispus, Crispinianus, and Benedicta
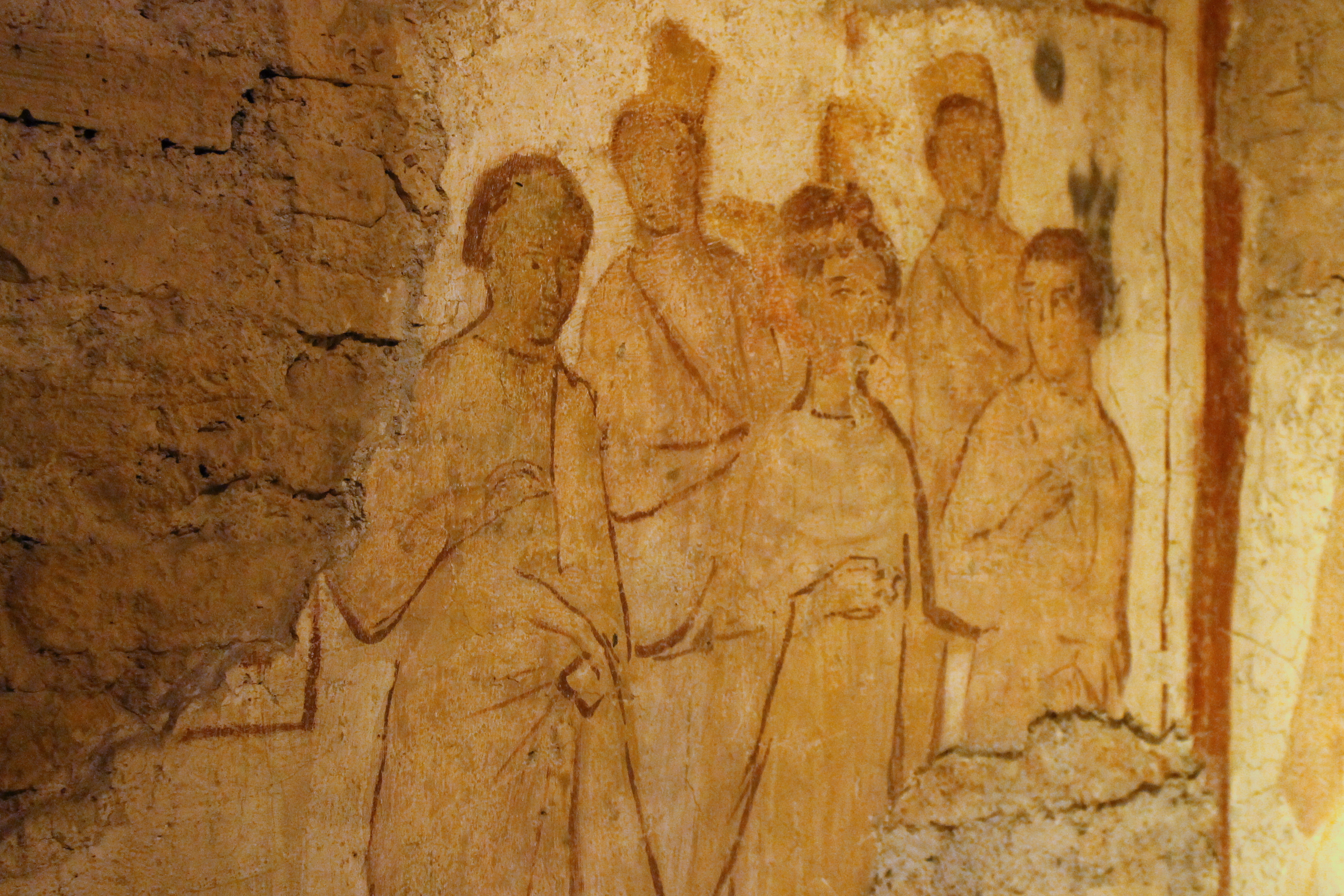
- This fourth-century fresco, found in the confessio (martyrdom shrine) of Saints John and Paul on the Caelian Hill, shows Crispus, Crispinianus, and Benedicta. Behind them are Roman magistrates or soldiers.

Martyrs
- Died: 27 June 362; Rome
- Venerated in: Catholic Church

Crispus (or Crispinus), Crispinianus and Benedicta were Roman Christian martyrs, venerated after their death as saints. According to hagiographical accounts, their death followed as a result of the martyrdom of Saints John and Paul. According to the Acta Sanctorum, they were killed during the reign of Julian. This would place their deaths during the years 361 to 363 AD. The traditional date of their martyrdom is 27 June 362.

== Acta martyrum ==
Their story was synthesized by the Bollandists into a unified account in the Acta Sanctorum using two sources: the Acts of Saints John and Paul (Acta SS. Ioannis et Pauli) and the Martyrology of Saint Jerome (Martyrologium S. Hieronymi). (Note: This syllogis historica (historical summary) is entitled De sanctis martyribus Romanis Crispo vel Crispino Presbyt., Crispiniano Clerico, et Benedicta Virgine ("On the holy Roman martyrs Crispus or Crispinus, priest; Crispinian, cleric; and Benedicta, virgin").) Their story is also recounted, alternately in Italian and Latin, by Antonio Bosio in Roma Sotteranea.

According to the martyrologies, the martyrdom of Crispus, Crispinianus, and Benedicta occurred in conjunction with that of Saints John and Paul, two soldiers who were put to death by the order of the emperor Julian the Apostate. Crispus was a priest, Crispinianus a cleric of indeterminate rank, and Benedicta a venerabilis femina ("venerable woman"). The Bollandist account refers to her as a virgin, whereas Antonio Bosio calls her matrona.

In the martyrdom account, John and Paul, condemned and awaiting their death, send for Crispus, Crispinian, and Benedicta so that the priest can offer Mass for them, and so that they can relate the story of their sufferings to the other Christians. John and Paul are being kept under house arrest. Ten days after their first visit, Crispus and his companions attempt to see John and Paul again to comfort them. This time, however, they are turned away by the guards. Shortly thereafter John and Paul are secretly killed and buried in their home. Crispus, Crispinianus, and Benedicta reacted to this news by "mourning in their home, and praying each day, and the tears from their eyes did not cease, both day and night." (Note: Lamentabantur in domo sua, & orabant quotidie, & non cessabant lacrymae ab oculis eorum, die noctuque.) They then pray to receive some sign of where John and Paul had been buried. Shortly thereafter, God reveals the location of the martyrs' bodies to them (manifestavit illis Deus). The means by which this revelation occurred is not specified.

The acta then changes into an account of a court proceeding against the three Christians. They had evidently been surprised while in prayer at the burial site of John and Paul and taken prisoner to be tried by Julian. When Julian interrogates Crispus, he admits the nature of his office in the Church, confessing himself to be peccator presbyter ("a priest and a sinner"). Ordered to sacrifice to the pagan gods, Crispus refuses, saying, "I offer sacrifice always to my Lord God Jesus Christ, day and night; but to your idols, I do not sacrifice." Enraged, Julian moves on to Crispinianus, who likewise confesses his role in the Church, which he describes as being servus servorum Christi ("the servant of the servants of Christ"). Crispinianus likewise refuses to offer sacrifice to the idols. Finally turning his attention to Benedicta, Julian orders her to sacrifice to the idols and, further, to accept a husband. To this command, Benedicta answers "in a loud voice" (magna voce): "I am a Christian, and I have Christ as my spouse; and I reject your gods, as if they were the dirt upon which my feet tread." (Note: Christiana sum ego, & Christum habeo sponsum: deos autem tuos, acsi lutum quod pedibus calcatur, abjicio. The Bollandists' conclusion that Benedicta was a virgin is based on this reply.)

Following their profession of faith, Crispus, Crispinianus, and Benedicta are put to death and their bodies left for the dogs. Secretly in the night, however, their bodies are saved by three men: two priests, named John and Pimeneus, and a layman named Fabianus. They are then buried in the home of John and Paul, "not far away" from the bodies of the martyrs who preceded them in death. Their burial is recorded as having occurred on June 28 (V Kalendas Iulias), the day after their martyrdom.

== Place of burial ==
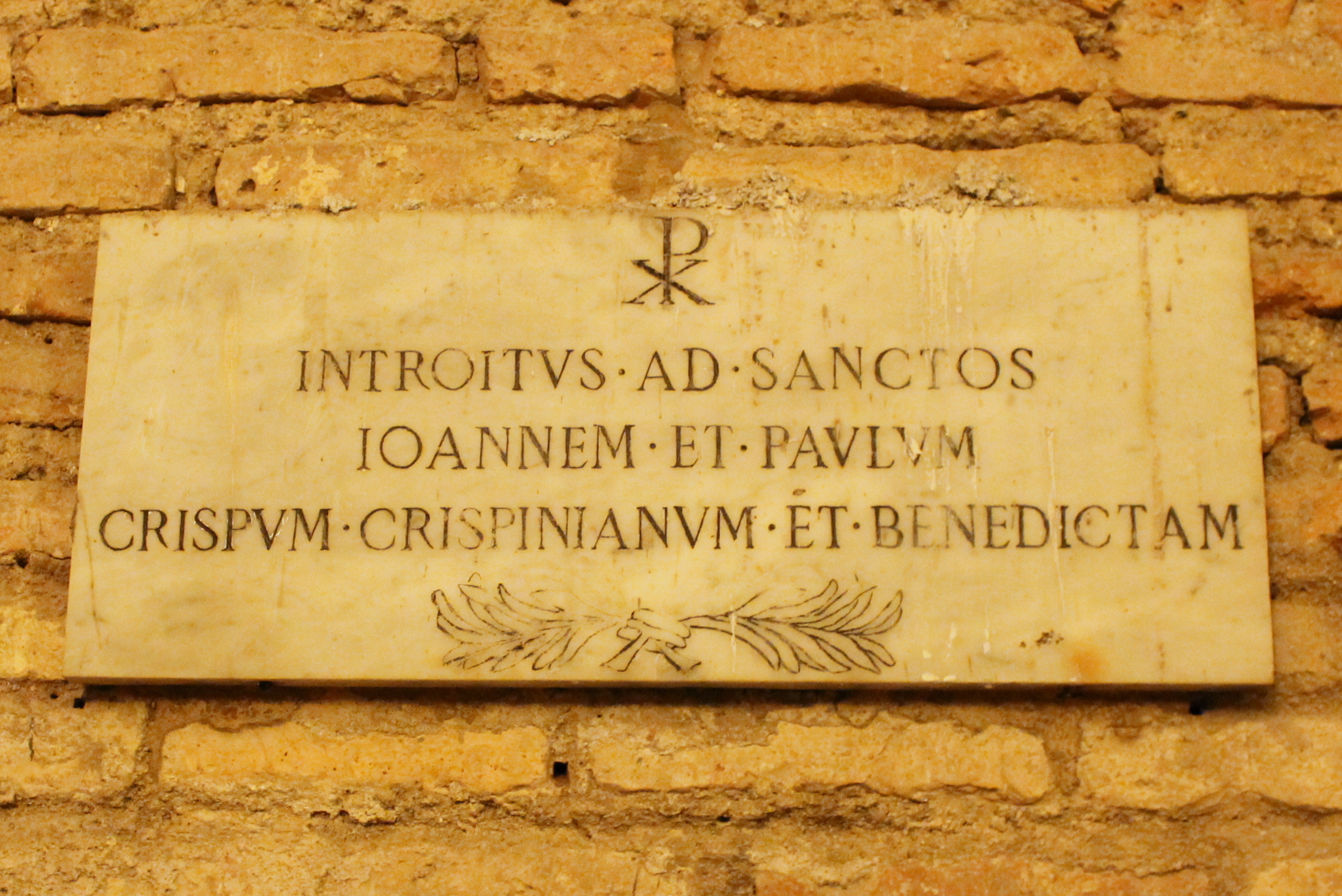
This plaque marks the room in which Saints John and Paul were buried, along with Crispus, Crispinianus, and Benedicta.

The reputed burial place of John and Paul was later transformed into the present-day Basilica of Saints John and Paul. Archaeological excavations carried out under the basilica in the nineteenth century revealed a complex of Roman homes, with evidence of a confessio (a devotional shrine) marking the place of the martyrs' burial.

The wall decoration of the shrine area is datable to the end of the fourth century. The frescoes show two male figures in orans position, probably John and Paul. Another scene shows the arrest of three people, identifiable with Crispus, Crispinianus, and Benedicta. Consonant with the martyrdom account, a dog is shown by the side of the Roman authorities carrying out the execution.

Three niches dug into the tuff rock of the confessio have been interpreted as the burial site of the martyrs.

== Notes and references ==
Notes
