= John and Paul =

4th-century Christian martyrs

Saints John and Paul
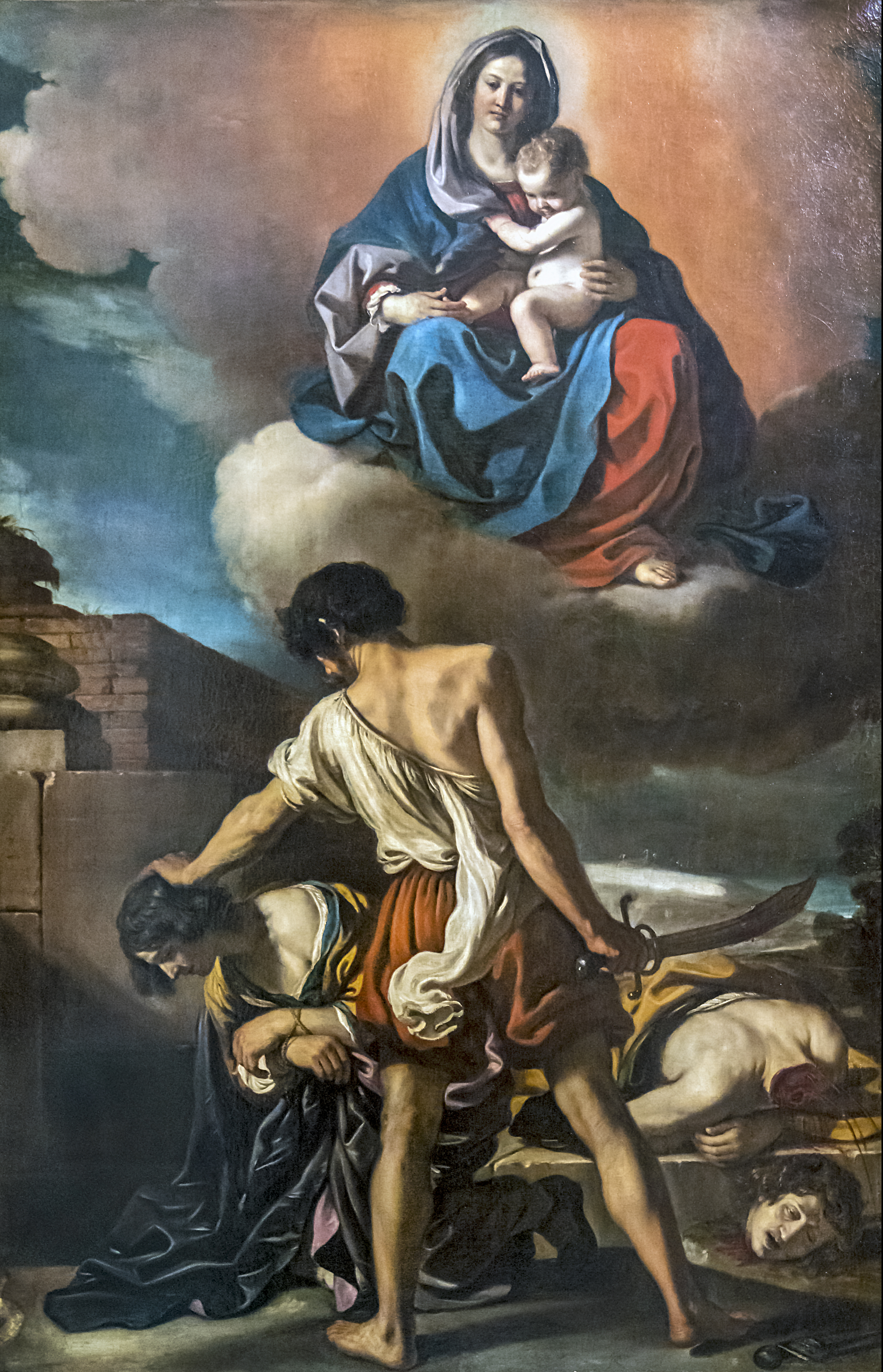
- Martyrdom of St. John and St. Paul, by Guercino, 1632.

Martyrs
- Died: c. 362; Rome
- Venerated in: Catholic Church; Eastern Orthodox Church
- Canonized: Pre-Congregation
- Feast: 26 June

John and Paul (Latin: Ioannes, Paulus) are saints who lived during the fourth century in the Roman Empire. They were martyred at Rome on 26 June. The year of their martyrdom is uncertain according to their Acts; it occurred under Julian the Apostate (361–363).

== Hagiography ==
In the second half of the fourth century, Byzantius, the Roman senator, and Saint Pammachius, his son, fashioned their house on the Cælian Hill into a Christian basilica. In the fifth century the presbyteri tituli Byzantii (priests of the church of Byzantius) are mentioned in an inscription and among the signatures of the Roman Council of 499. The church was also called the titulus Pammachii after Byzantius's son, the pious friend of St. Jerome.

In the ancient apartments on the ground-floor of the house of Byzantius, which were still retained under the basilica, the tomb of two Roman martyrs, John and Paul, was the object of veneration as early as the fifth century.

The Sacramentarium Leonianum already indicates in the preface to the feast of the saints, that they rested within the city walls, while, in one of the early itineraries to the tombs of the Roman martyrs, their grave is assigned to the church on the Cælian (de Rossi, Roma sotterranea, I, 138, 175).

The titulus Byzantii or Pammachii was consequently known at a very early date by the names of the two martyrs (titulus SS. Joannis et Pauli). Their bodies were buried in the house of Pammachius under the basilica in the fourth century, but the year and circumstances of their martyrdom are unknown. It may have occurred during the reign of Diocletian (304 AD), as the martyrdoms of Julian took place not in Rome, but mainly in the East.

== Acts ==
According to their Acts, which are legendary and may not be historically reliable, after successful military careers, Constantine the Great entrusted John and Paul with the protection of his daughter, Constantia. Through her, they became acquainted with a certain Gallicanus, who, according to a medieval legend, was her fiancé. Gallicanus is said to have built a church in Ostia. Constantine bequeathed significant sums to the faithful of John and Paul, who built a house on the Caelian Hill and retired to private life, doing works of charity. Other accounts say it was Constantia who left her wealth to her servants for them to spend on Christian works.

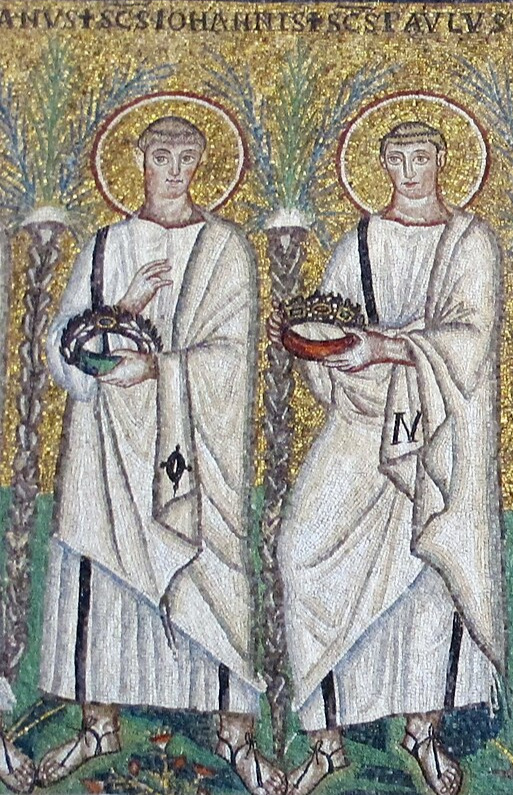
Mosaic from the Basilica of Sant'Apollinare Nuovo

They declined to return to service under Julian the Apostate, whereupon the emperor gave them ten days to reconsider. They spent the ten days dispersing their wealth, distributing alms day and night. Emperor Julian had them beheaded secretly by Terentianus in their house on the Caelian Hill. Terentianus had them buried where they died and spread the rumor that they had gone into exile. Three Christians who were ministering to them were also executed and buried nearby: Crispus, Crispinianus, and Benedicta.

The rooms on the ground-floor of the above-mentioned house of Pammachius were rediscovered in the 19th century under the Basilica of Santi Giovanni e Paolo in Rome. They are decorated with frescoes, while the original tomb (confessio) of Sts. John and Paul is covered with paintings of which the martyrs are the subject. The rooms and the tomb form one of the most important early Christian memorials in Rome.

The Acts of Saints John and Paul are also connected with the legend of St Bibiana, which has no historical claim to belief.

== Veneration ==
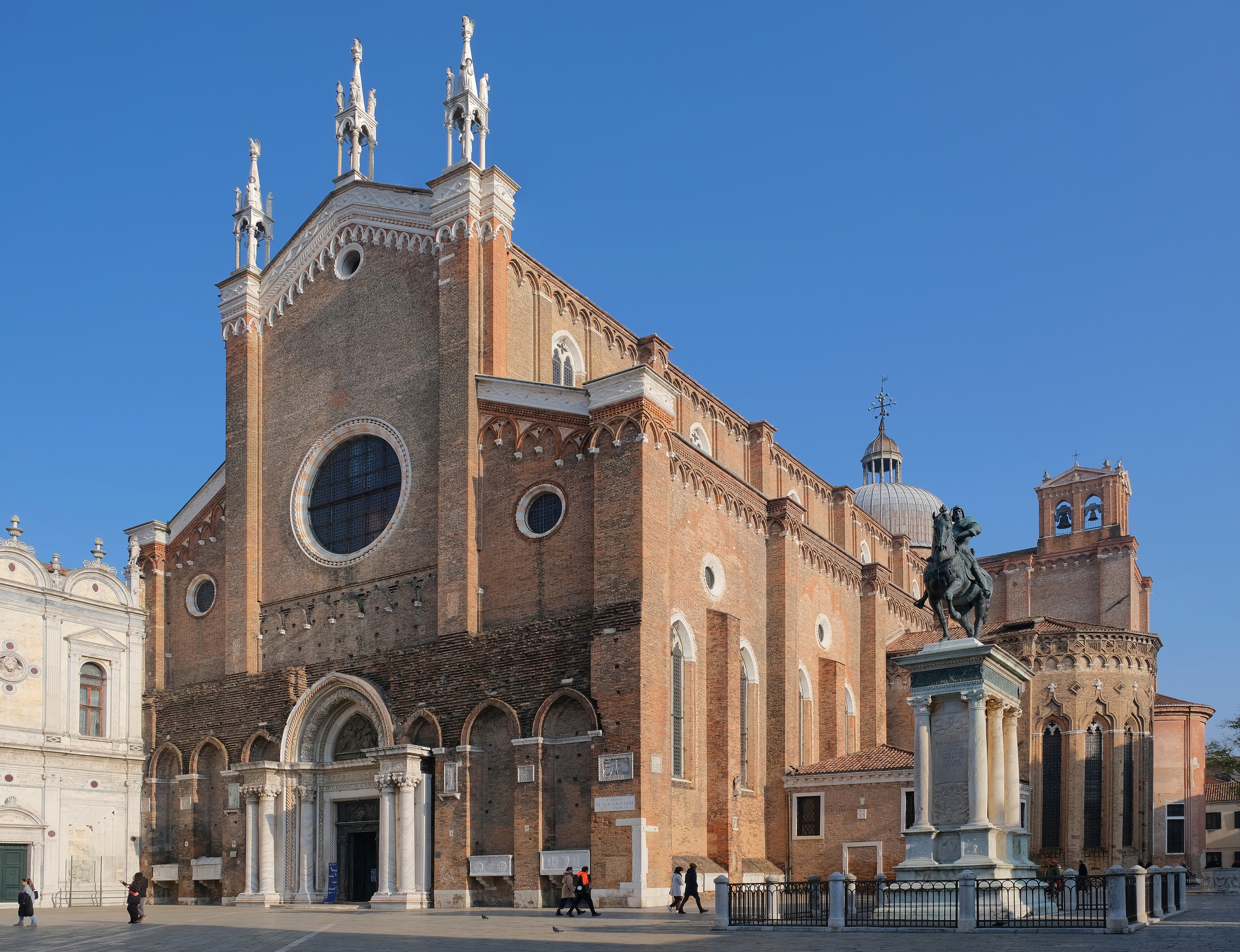
The church of San Zanipolo

The basilica of Santi Giovanni e Paolo in Rome is dedicated to them, as is the Basilica di San Zanipolo in Venice ("Zanipolo" being Venetian for "John and Paul"). Since the erection of the Roman basilica, the two saints have been greatly venerated, and since the 5th century, their names have been included in the Roman Canon.

Their feast is kept on 26 June.

== Saints John and Paul's Day ==
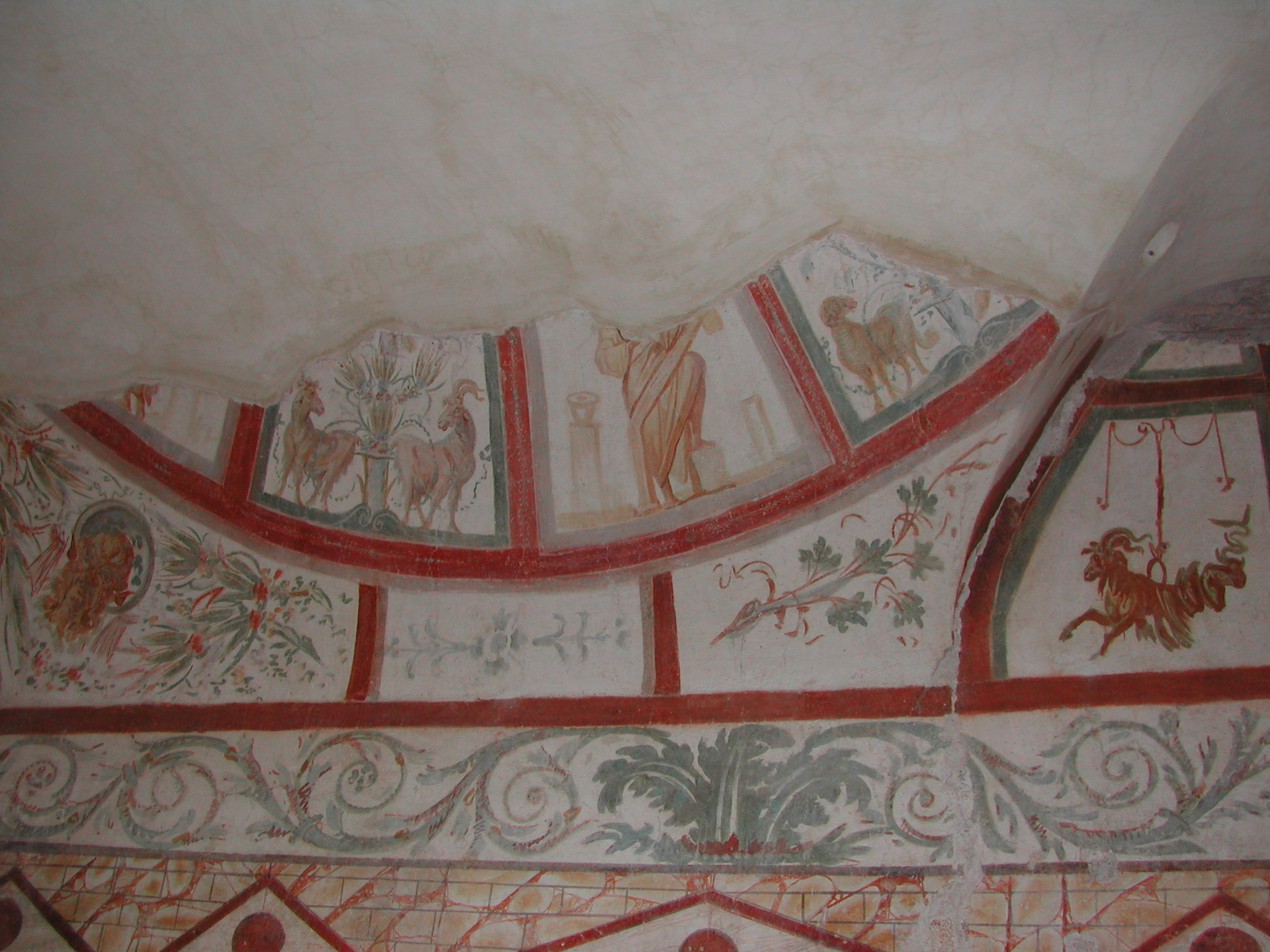
The original Roman house below the present-day Basilica of Santi Giovanni e Paolo

The Lüneberg manuscript (c. 1440–1450) mentions the day of John and Paul in an early German account of the Pied Piper of Hamelin:

In 1284 on the day of John and Paul on 26th June
130 children born in Hamelin were led away
by a piper [clothed] in many colours
to [their] Calvary near the Koppen, [and] lost'.

== Campania Town ==
A small village next to Caiazzo in the Campania region of Italy is named Ss. Giovanni e Paolo in honor of these martyrs. Many residents of this village bear the family name "San Giovanni," as do the descendants of immigrants to the United States from this village (in particular, in Michigan, New York, and Florida).

== Bibliography ==
- The Golden Legend: Saints John and Paul
- Saints of 26 June
- (in Italian) Santi Giovanni e Paolo
