= Ardicino della Porta, iuniore =

Roman Catholic cardinal

Ardicino della Porta the Younger (It.: Ardicino della Porta, iuniore) (1434–1493) (called the Cardinal of Aléria) was an Italian Roman Catholic bishop and cardinal.

== Biography ==
Ardicino della Porta was born in Novara in 1434. He was the grand-nephew of Cardinal Ardicino della Porta, seniore. He was a doctor of both laws.

Early in his career, he was vicar general of the Archdiocese of Florence, in which capacity he published the interdict of Pope Paul II against Florence. He later served as papal legate to Frederick III, Holy Roman Emperor and to Matthias Corvinus, King of Hungary to encourage them to participate in a crusade against the Ottoman Empire. He then became a Referendary of the Roman Curia.

On 22 February 1475, he was elected Bishop of Aléria, a post he occupied until his death. He went on to serve as a datary under Pope Sixtus IV. He would go on to serve as governor of Norcia, Terni, Perugia, and Città di Castello. Pope Innocent VIII put him in charge of managing relations with ambassadors to the Holy See.

In the consistory of 9 March 1489, Pope Innocent VIII made him a cardinal priest. He received the red hat on 14 March 1489 with the titular church of Santi Giovanni e Paolo. On 3 June 1489, he became apostolic administrator of the metropolitan see of Olomouc, a post he held until 8 February 1492.

On 2 June 1492, he asked the pope to allow him to resign the cardinalate and, with the pope's permission, he retired to a Camaldolese monastery. However, the other members of the College of Cardinals objected, and he was forced to return to Rome.

He participated in the papal conclave of 1492 that elected Pope Alexander VI.

He died in Rome on 4 February 1493. He is buried in St. Peter's Basilica.
