= Monte Rotondo (Monti Sibillini) =

Monte Rotondo is a mountain located in Marche, Italy

- Location within Italy

Highest point
- Prominence: 322 m (1,056 ft)
- Coordinates: 42°58′54″N 13°12′10″E

Geography
- Location: Marche, Italy

Monte Rotondo (Monti Sibillini) is a mountain of Marche, Italy. It has been a popular destination for mountain hikers since the 19th century.
