= Ježevec =

- Location in Slovenia
- Coordinates: 46°1′26.99″N 15°5′22.22″E
- Country: Slovenia
- Traditional region: Lower Carniola
- Statistical region: Central Sava
- Municipality: Litija

Area
  - Total: 0.66 km^{2} (0.25 sq mi)
- Elevation: 706.3 m (2,317 ft)

Population (2002)
  - Total: 14
- Postal code: 1273

Ježevec (pronounced [ˈjeːʒɛʋəts]) is a small relatively remote settlement in the hills east of Dole pri Litiji in the Municipality of Litija in central Slovenia. The area is part of the traditional region of Lower Carniola. It is now included with the rest of the municipality in the Central Sava Statistical Region; until January 2014 the municipality was part of the Central Slovenia Statistical Region.
