= Pietro Andrea Barbieri Pucciardi =

Italian painter

Pietro Antonio or Pier Antonio Barbieri or Barbieri Pucciardi (active 1702-1730s) was an Italian painter, active in Rome, as a painter of religious subjects.

== Biography ==
He was born in Fosdinovo and studied in Bologna with Giovanni Giuseppe del Sole. From there he traveled to Rome to study at the Accademia di San Luca, where he won prizes in 1702. In 1727 he was a custodian of the Academy, and secretary of the Academy in 1729. He painted the Cappella Casoni and the cupola of the Sarzana Cathedral.

One source says he died in 1736.
