= Dole pri Litiji =

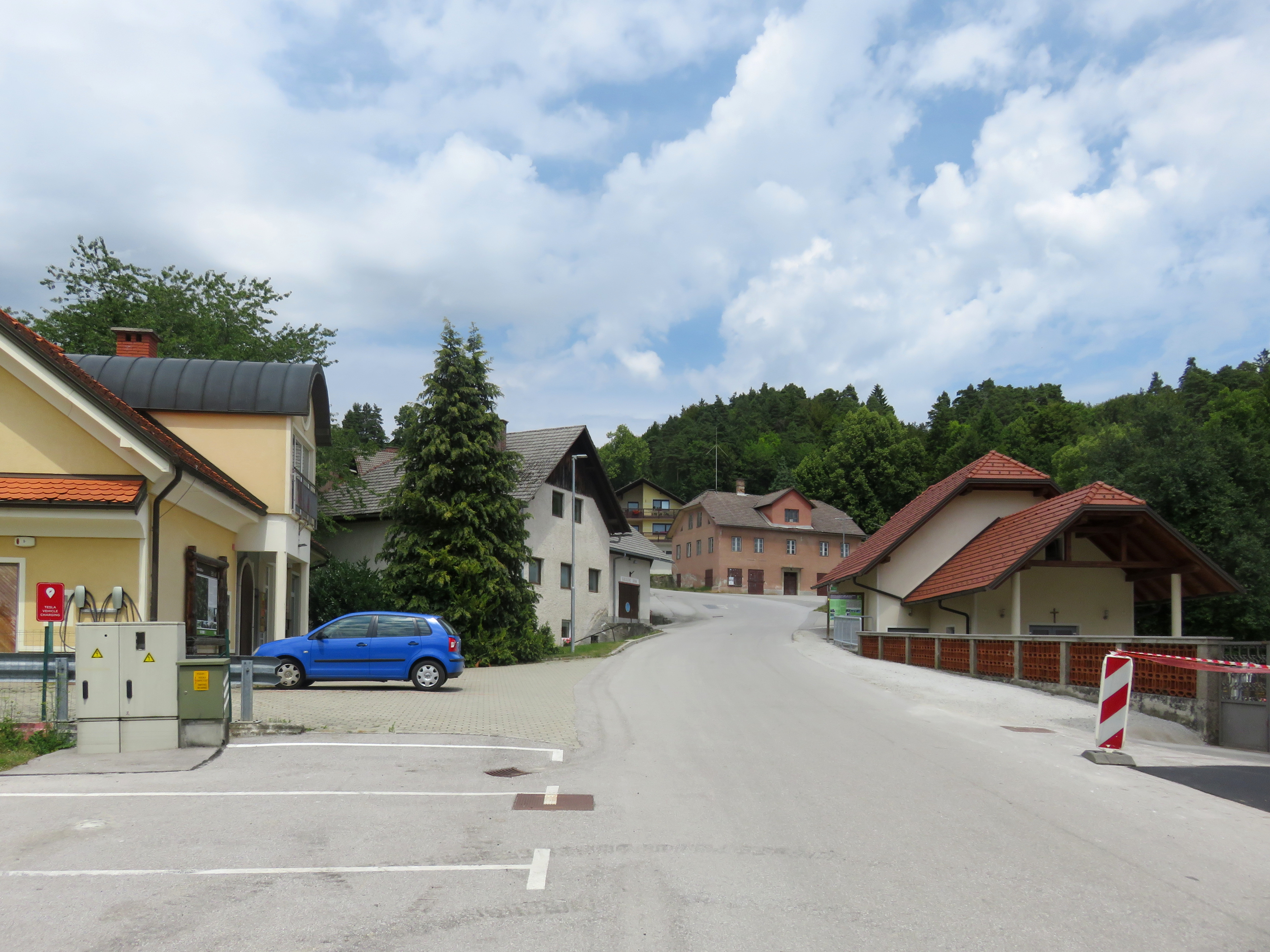

- Location in Slovenia
- Coordinates: 46°1′47.19″N 15°1′19.5″E
- Country: Slovenia
- Traditional region: Lower Carniola
- Statistical region: Central Sava
- Municipality: Litija

Area
  - Total: 2.25 km^{2} (0.87 sq mi)
- Elevation: 676 m (2,218 ft)

Population (2002)
  - Total: 113
- Postal code: 1273

Dole pri Litiji (pronounced [ˈdoːlɛ pɾi liˈtiːji]; German: Mariathal) is a village in the Municipality of Litija in central Slovenia. The area is part of the traditional region of Lower Carniola. It is now included with the rest of the municipality in the Central Sava Statistical Region; until January 2014 the municipality was part of the Central Slovenia Statistical Region.

== Church ==
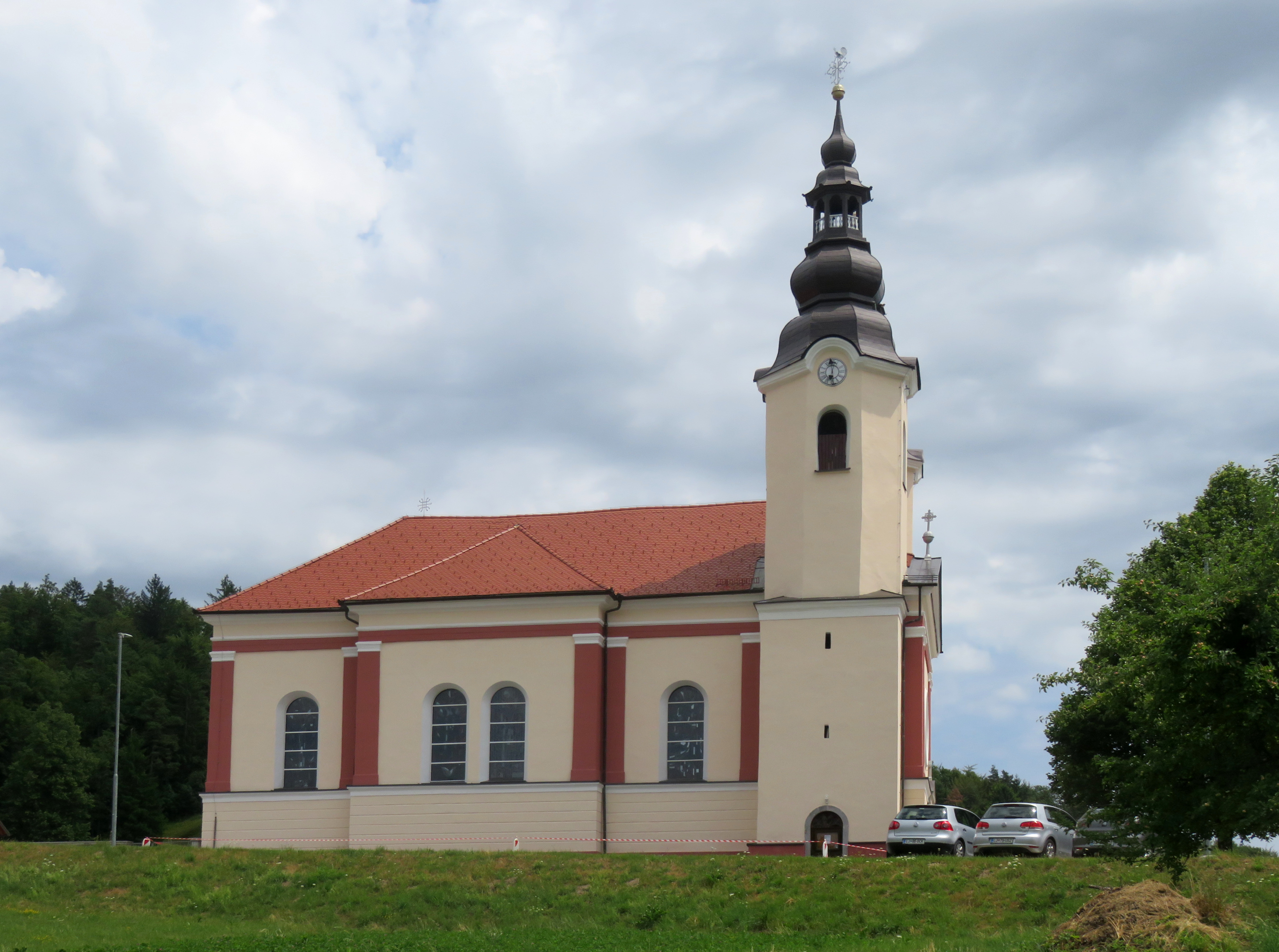
Assumption Church

The local parish church is dedicated to the Assumption of Mary and belongs to the Roman Catholic Diocese of Novo Mesto. It was built in 1858.
