= Cvetež, Litija =

Cvetež
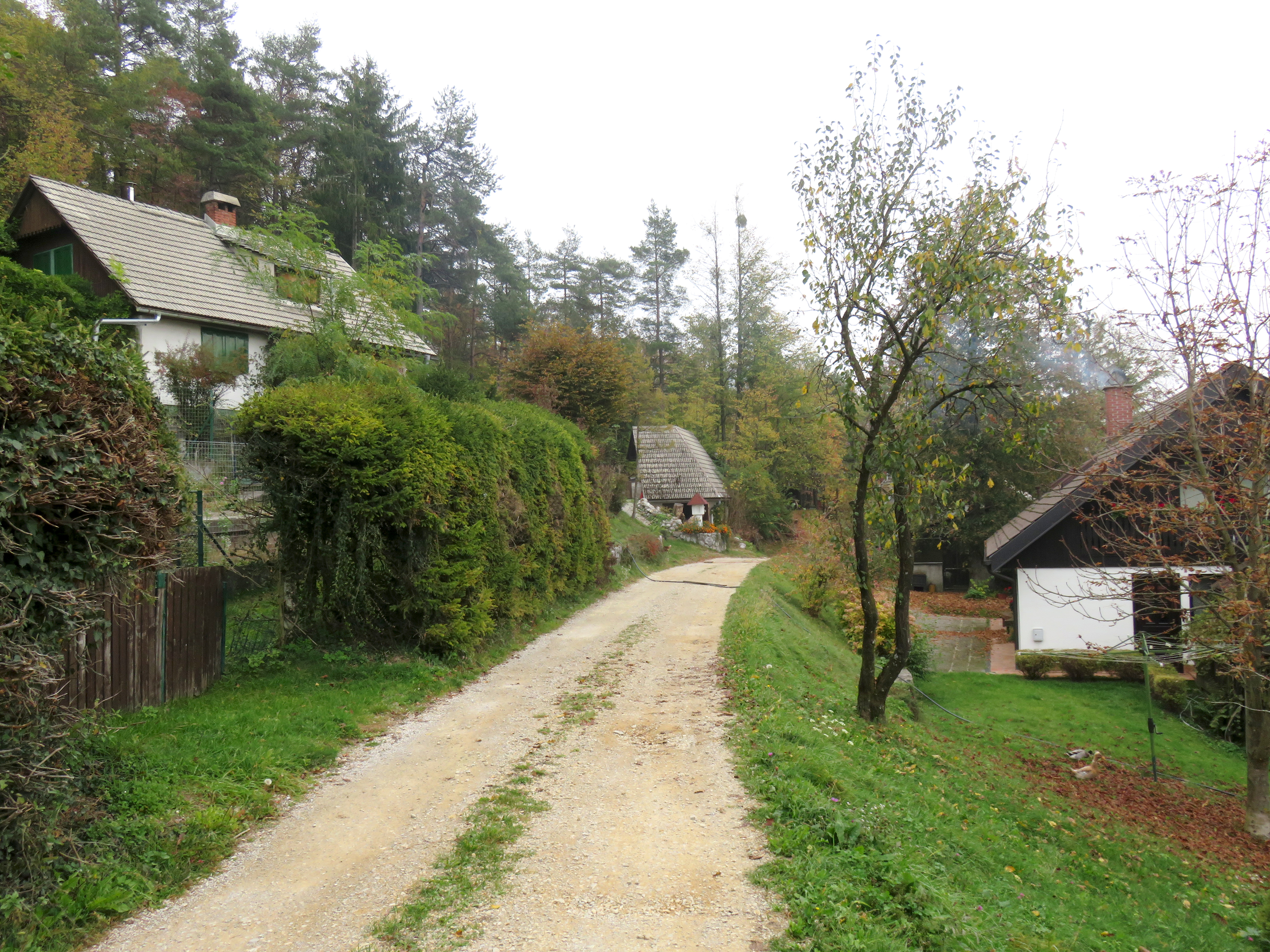

- Location in Slovenia
- Coordinates: 46°7′28″N 14°51′56″E
- Country: Slovenia
- Traditional region: Upper Carniola
- Statistical region: Central Sava
- Municipality: Litija
- Elevation: 647 m (2,123 ft)

Cvetež (Slovene pronunciation: [ˈtsʋeːtɛʃ], German: Zwetesch) is a former settlement in the Municipality of Litija in central Slovenia. It is now part of the village of Vovše. The area is part of the traditional region of Upper Carniola and is now included with the rest of the municipality in the Central Sava Statistical Region.

== Geography ==
Cvetež stands in the westernmost part of Vovše, along a road on a ridge known as Holy Mount in the Central Sava Valley (Slovene: Zasavska Sveta gora).

== History ==
Cvetež had a population of 26 living in four houses in 1880, and 26 living in five houses in 1900. Cvetež was annexed by Vovše in 1952, ending its existence as a separate settlement.
