= Vovše =

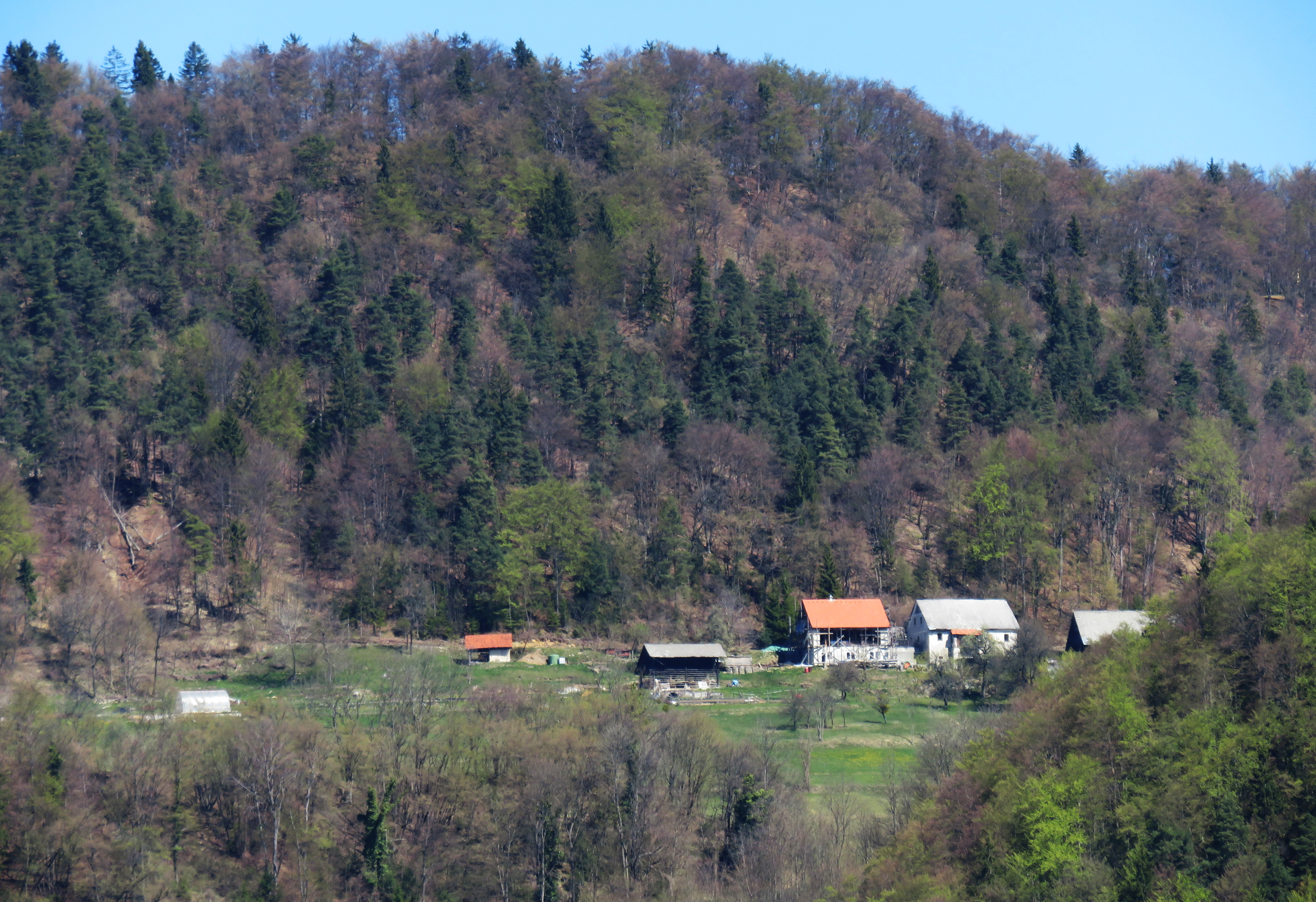

- Location in Slovenia
- Coordinates: 46°7′35.21″N 14°53′1.2″E
- Country: Slovenia
- Traditional region: Upper Carniola
- Statistical region: Central Sava
- Municipality: Litija

Area
  - Total: 1.73 km^{2} (0.67 sq mi)
- Elevation: 684.8 m (2,247 ft)

Population (2002)
  - Total: 14
- Postal code: 1252

Vovše (pronounced [ˈʋoːu̯ʃɛ]; in older sources and locally also Ovsiše, German: Ousische or Wousche) is a settlement in the hills east of Vače in the Municipality of Litija in central Slovenia. The area is part of the traditional region of Upper Carniola and is now included with the rest of the municipality in the Central Sava Statistical Region. It includes the hamlets of Cvetež, Toge, and V Mejah.

== Cultural heritage ==
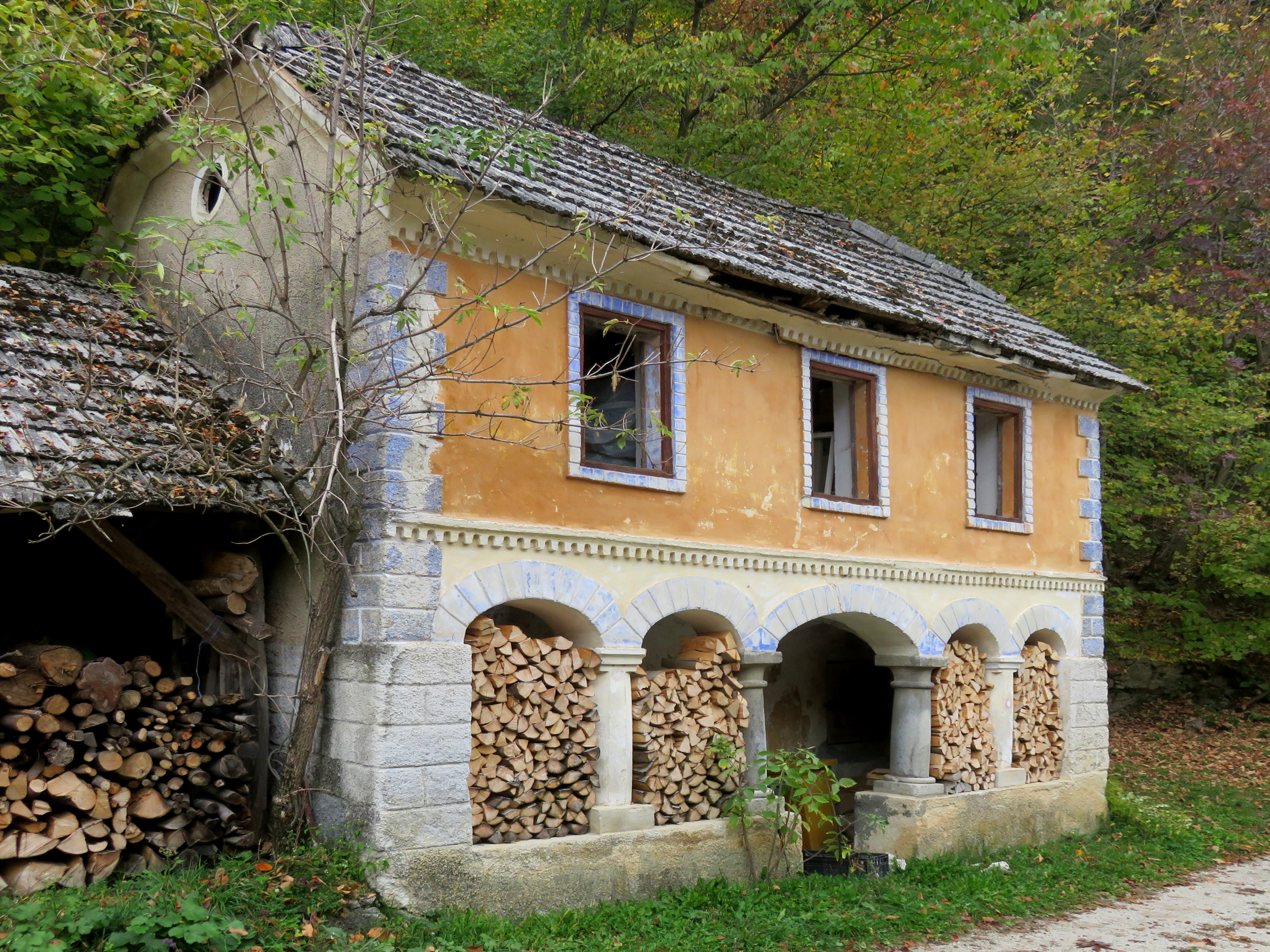
Pigsty and dower's cottage

There is a two-story masonry pigsty dating from the 19th century at Vovše no 5. The structure has an arcaded ground floor, and the upper floor was built as a dower cottage, where a retired farmer that has passed his property on to his heirs could live. The arcade features four columns: the inner two are round, and the outer two are octagonal. The upper floor has three windows, and the two floors are separated by a decorative cornice.
