= Sodrež =

- Location in Slovenia
- Coordinates: 46°24′01″N 15°29′37″E
- Country: Slovenia
- Traditional region: Styria
- Statistical region: Drava
- Municipality: Slovenska Bistrica
- Elevation: 430 m (1,410 ft)

Sodrež (pronounced [ˈsoːdɾɛʃ], in older sources also Sodreš, German: Sodresch) is a former settlement in the Municipality of Slovenska Bistrica in northeastern Slovenia. It is now part of the village of Fošt. The area is part of the traditional region of Styria and is now included with the rest of the municipality in the Drava Statistical Region.

== Geography ==
Sodrež lies in the southwestern part of Fošt, 4 kilometers (2.5 mi) south of Malo Tinje.

== History ==
Sodrež had a population of 43 living in 11 houses in 1870, 39 living in 12 houses in 1880, and 43 living in 14 houses in 1900. Sodrež was annexed by Fošt in 1953, ending its existence as a separate settlement.
