= Leskovec, Slovenska Bistrica =

Leskovec
- Location in Slovenia
- Coordinates: 46°23′19.67″N 15°38′9.39″E
- Country: Slovenia
- Traditional region: Styria
- Statistical region: Drava
- Municipality: Slovenska Bistrica

Area
  - Total: 3.13 km^{2} (1.21 sq mi)
- Elevation: 250.5 m (822 ft)

Population (2002)
  - Total: 420

Leskovec (pronounced [ˈleːskɔʋəts]) is a dispersed settlement in the Pohorje Hills in the Municipality of Slovenska Bistrica in northeastern Slovenia. It lies on the local road from Stari Log to Spodnja Nova Vas, southwest of Pragersko. The area is part of the traditional region of Styria. It is now included with the rest of the municipality in the Drava Statistical Region.
