= Ješovec, Slovenska Bistrica =

Ješovec
- Location in Slovenia
- Coordinates: 46°19′53.76″N 15°37′52.97″E
- Country: Slovenia
- Traditional region: Styria
- Statistical region: Drava
- Municipality: Slovenska Bistrica

Area
  - Total: 0.64 km^{2} (0.25 sq mi)
- Elevation: 253.1 m (830 ft)

Population (2002)
  - Total: 23

Ješovec (pronounced [jɛˈʃɔːʋəts] or [jɛˈʃoːʋəts]) is a small settlement on the right bank of the Ložnica River in the Municipality of Slovenska Bistrica in northeastern Slovenia. The area is part of the traditional region of Styria. It is now included with the rest of the municipality in the Drava Statistical Region.

The local church is dedicated to the Three Kings and belongs to the Parish of Črešnjevec. It was built between 1639 and 1648.
