= Gornji Log =

- Location in Slovenia
- Coordinates: 46°21′40″N 15°32′48″E
- Country: Slovenia
- Traditional region: Styria
- Statistical region: Drava
- Municipality: Slovenska Bistrica
- Elevation: 321 m (1,053 ft)

Gornji Log (pronounced [ˈɡoːɾnji ˈloːk], German: Oberwald) is a former settlement in the Municipality of Slovenska Bistrica in northeastern Slovenia. It is now part of the village of Cigonca. The area is part of the traditional region of Styria and is now included with the rest of the municipality in the Drava Statistical Region.

== Geography ==
Gornji Log lies in the southwestern part of the village of Cigonca, in the Grajenka Woods. The Kac farm (Slovene: Pri Kacu) is located in Gornji Log.

== Name ==
The name Gornji Log literally means 'upper woods', corresponding to the German name Oberwald. The name Log is shared with many other settlements in Slovenia and is derived from the Slovene word log 'partially forested (marshy) meadow near water' or 'woods near a settlement'.

== History ==
Gornji Log had a population of 23 living in four houses in 1900. Gornji Log was annexed by Cigonca in 1952, ending its existence as a separate settlement.
