= Nova Gora nad Slovensko Bistrico =

- Location in Slovenia
- Coordinates: 46°24′41″N 15°32′51″E
- Country: Slovenia
- Traditional region: Styria
- Statistical region: Drava
- Municipality: Slovenska Bistrica

Area
  - Total: 0.9 km^{2} (0.35 sq mi)
- Elevation: 500 m (1,600 ft)

Population (2015)
  - Total: 153

Nova Gora nad Slovensko Bistrico (pronounced [ˈnɔːʋa ˈɡɔːɾa nat slɔˈʋeːnskɔ ˈbiːstɾitsɔ]) is a settlement in the hills north-northwest of Slovenska Bistrica in northeastern Slovenia. The area is part of the traditional region of Styria. It is now included with the rest of the Municipality of Slovenska Bistrica in the Drava Statistical Region.

== History ==
Nova Gora nad Slovensko Bistrico became a separate village in 2000, when its territory was administratively separated from Kovača Vas, Slovenska Bistrica, and Zgornja Bistrica.
