= Bukovec, Slovenska Bistrica =

Bukovec
- Location in Slovenia
- Coordinates: 46°26′5.02″N 15°37′39.47″E
- Country: Slovenia
- Traditional region: Styria
- Statistical region: Drava
- Municipality: Slovenska Bistrica

Area
  - Total: 2.16 km^{2} (0.83 sq mi)
- Elevation: 308.7 m (1,013 ft)

Population (2002)
  - Total: 309

Bukovec (pronounced [ˈbuːkɔʋəts]) is a settlement northeast of Slovenska Bistrica in northeastern Slovenia. The area is part of the traditional region of Styria. It is now included with the rest of the Municipality of Slovenska Bistrica in the Drava Statistical Region.

A small chapel in the settlement is dedicated to John of Nepomuk and belongs to the Parish of Zgornja Polskava. It dates to the second half of the 18th century.
