= Korplje =

- Location in Slovenia
- Coordinates: 46°22′41.43″N 15°30′42.96″E
- Country: Slovenia
- Traditional region: Styria
- Statistical region: Drava
- Municipality: Slovenska Bistrica

Area
  - Total: 0.16 km^{2} (0.062 sq mi)
- Elevation: 297.7 m (977 ft)

Population (2002)
  - Total: 46

Korplje (pronounced [ˈkoːɾpljɛ]) is a small settlement on the right bank of the Ložnica River in the Municipality of Slovenska Bistrica in northeastern Slovenia. The area is part of the traditional region of Styria. It is now included with the rest of the municipality in the Drava Statistical Region.

A small roadside chapel just outside the village was built in the early 19th century and renovated in 1945 and again in 1995.
