= Ogljenšak =

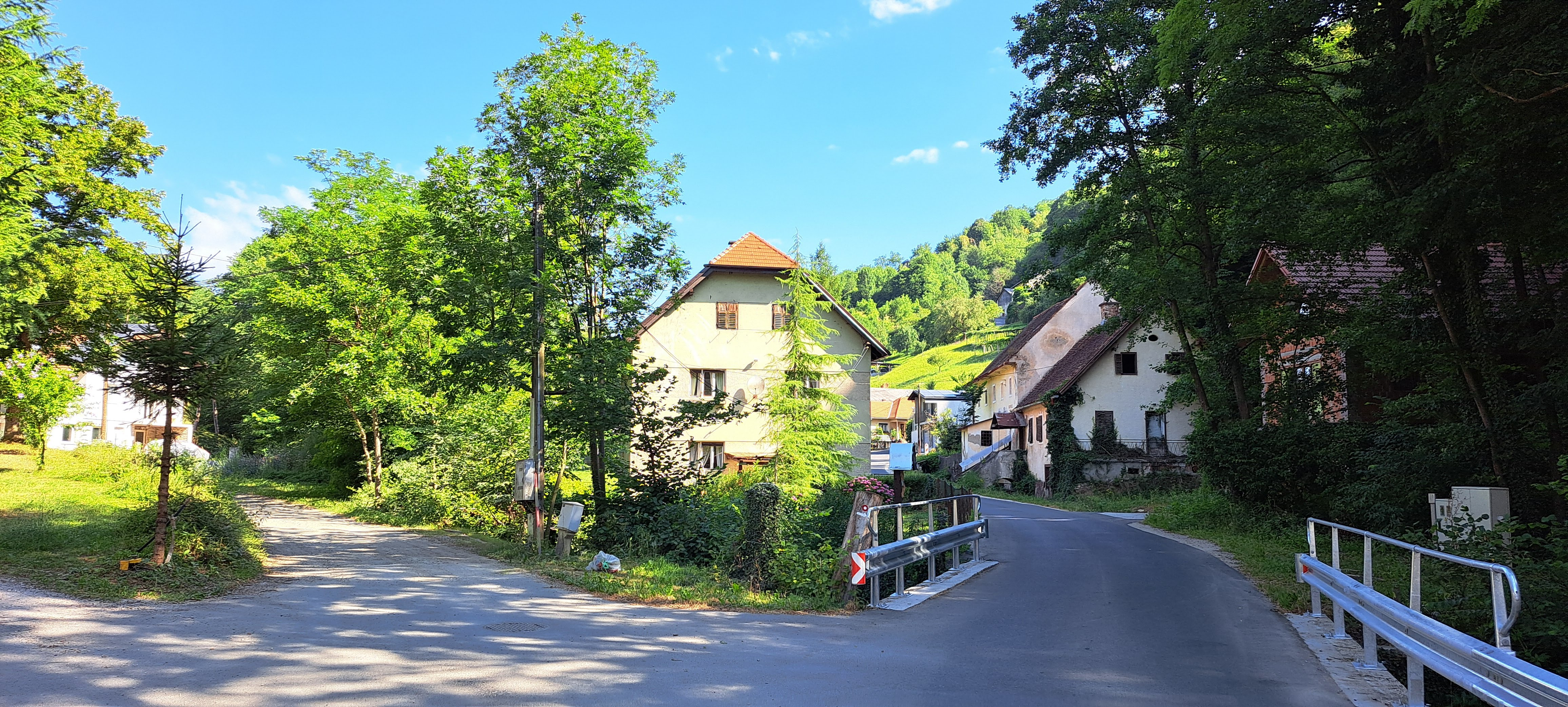

- Location in Slovenia
- Coordinates: 46°26′3.23″N 15°36′10.44″E
- Country: Slovenia
- Traditional region: Styria
- Statistical region: Drava
- Municipality: Slovenska Bistrica

Area
  - Total: 0.81 km^{2} (0.31 sq mi)
- Elevation: 313.5 m (1,029 ft)

Population (2002)
  - Total: 198

Ogljenšak (pronounced [ˈoːɡljɛnʃak]) is a settlement in the Municipality of Slovenska Bistrica in northeastern Slovenia. The area is part of the traditional region of Styria. It lies in the foothills of the Pohorje range, just north of Zgornja Polskava. It is now included with the rest of the municipality in the Drava Statistical Region.
