= Planina pod Šumikom =

- Location in Slovenia
- Coordinates: 46°26′36.59″N 15°29′25.98″E
- Country: Slovenia
- Traditional region: Styria
- Statistical region: Drava
- Municipality: Slovenska Bistrica

Area
  - Total: 23.31 km^{2} (9.00 sq mi)
- Elevation: 843.5 m (2,767 ft)

Population (2002)
  - Total: 89

Planina pod Šumikom (pronounced [plaˈnìːna pɔt ʃuˈmiːkɔm]) is a dispersed settlement in the Pohorje Hills in the Municipality of Slovenska Bistrica in northeastern Slovenia. The area is part of the traditional region of Styria. It is now included with the rest of the municipality in the Drava Statistical Region.

== Name ==
The name of the settlement was changed from Planina to Planina pod Šumnikom in 1955.

== Church ==
The local church is dedicated to the Three Kings and belongs to the Parish of Tinje. It dates to the early 16th century.
