= Urh =

Urh or URH may refer to:

- Urh, Slovenska Bistrica, a settlement in Slovenska Bistrica, Slovenia
- Borut Urh (born 1974), Slovenian tennis player
- Urh Kastelic (born 1996), Slovenian handball player

== See also ==
- Primož Urh-Zupan (born 1983), Slovenian ski jumper
- URH, the former name of JamRadio, Hull University Union's student campus radio station
- Schweizerische Schifffahrtsgesellschaft Untersee und Rhein (URh), a boat operator in Switzerland
