= Rittersberg =

Rittersberg may refer to:

- Rittersberg, Marienberg, a district of Marienberg, Germany
- Ritoznoj (German name Rittersberg), a settlement in northeastern Slovenia
- a fictive town from the point-and-click adventure game The Beast Within: A Gabriel Knight Mystery
