= Lokanja Vas =

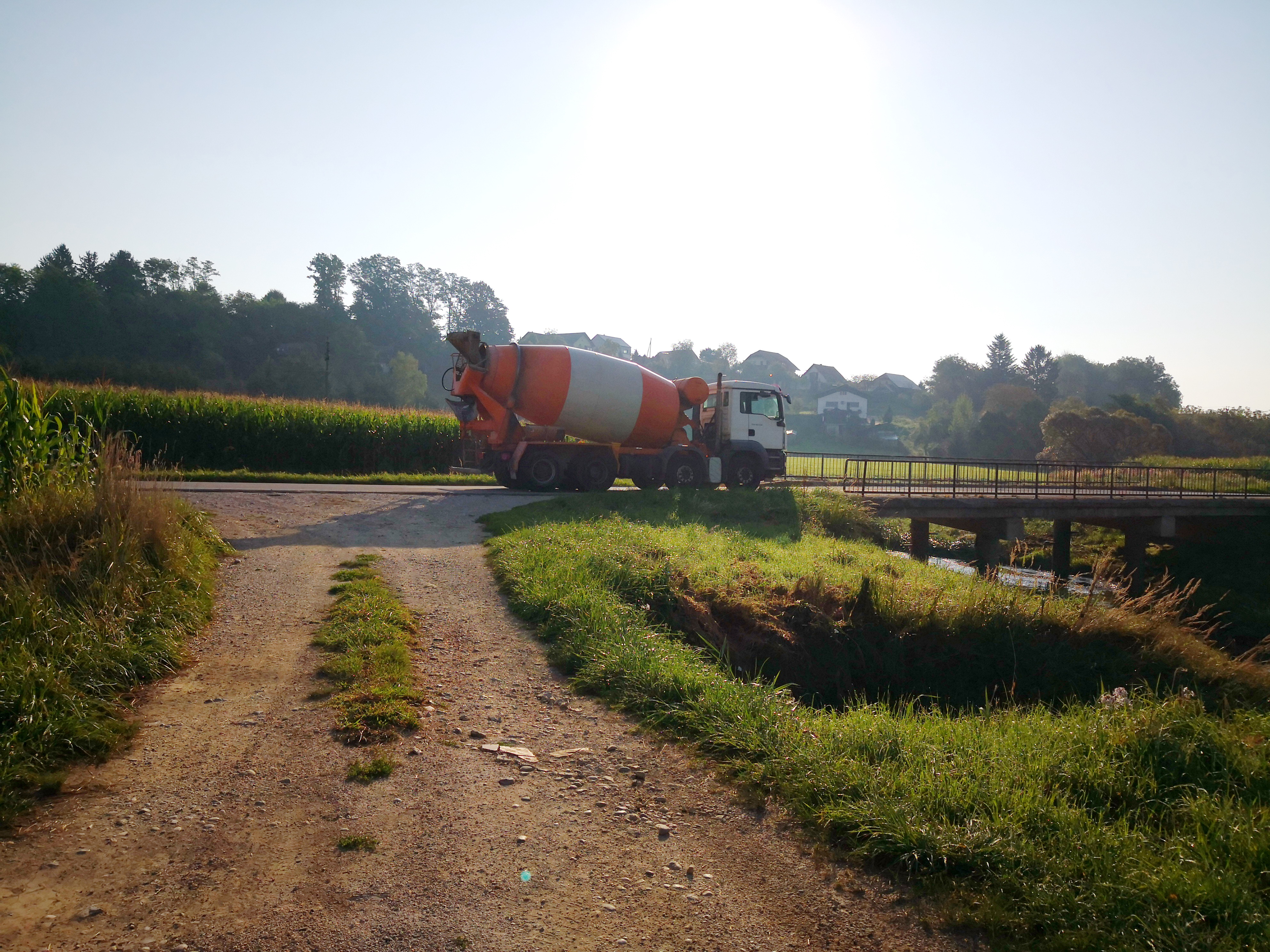
- A truck west of Lokanja Vas

- Location in Slovenia
- Coordinates: 46°22′19.52″N 15°35′51.59″E
- Country: Slovenia
- Traditional region: Styria
- Statistical region: Drava
- Municipality: Slovenska Bistrica

Area
  - Total: 1.23 km^{2} (0.47 sq mi)
- Elevation: 262.2 m (860 ft)

Population (2002)
  - Total: 103

Lokanja Vas (pronounced [lɔˈkaːnja ˈʋaːs]; Slovene: Lokanja vas) is a small village in the Municipality of Slovenska Bistrica in northeastern Slovenia. It lies on the left bank of the Ložnica River south of Slovenska Bistrica itself on the local road leading to the town's railway station. The area is part of the traditional region of Styria. It is now included with the rest of the municipality in the Drava Statistical Region.
