= Radkovec =

- Location in Slovenia
- Coordinates: 46°24′31″N 15°28′52″E
- Country: Slovenia
- Traditional region: Styria
- Statistical region: Drava
- Municipality: Slovenska Bistrica

Area
  - Total: 1.0 km^{2} (0.39 sq mi)
- Elevation: 640 m (2,100 ft)

Population (2015)
  - Total: 42

Radkovec (pronounced [ɾaˈtkoːʋəts]) is a small village in the Pohorje Hills in the Municipality of Slovenska Bistrica in northeastern Slovenia. The area is part of the traditional region of Styria. It is now included with the rest of the municipality in the Drava Statistical Region.

== History ==
Radkovec became a separate village in 2000, when it was administratively separated from Malo Tinje.
