= Sele pri Polskavi =

- Location in Slovenia
- Coordinates: 46°25′8.28″N 15°37′50.52″E
- Country: Slovenia
- Traditional region: Styria
- Statistical region: Drava
- Municipality: Slovenska Bistrica

Area
  - Total: 1.74 km^{2} (0.67 sq mi)
- Elevation: 271.2 m (890 ft)

Population (2002)
  - Total: 181

Sele pri Polskavi (pronounced [ˈseːlɛ pɾi pɔlˈskaːʋi]) is a settlement in the Municipality of Slovenska Bistrica in northeastern Slovenia. It lies between Zgornja Polskava and Spodnja Polskava. The area is part of the traditional region of Styria. It is now included with the rest of the municipality in the Drava Statistical Region.

== Name ==
The name of the settlement was changed from Sele to Sele pri Polskavi in 1955.
