= Šentovec =

- Location in Slovenia
- Coordinates: 46°24′43.3″N 15°34′55.1″E
- Country: Slovenia
- Traditional region: Styria
- Statistical region: Drava
- Municipality: Slovenska Bistrica

Area
  - Total: 0.96 km^{2} (0.37 sq mi)
- Elevation: 295.2 m (969 ft)

Population (2002)
  - Total: 122

Šentovec (pronounced [ʃɛnˈtɔːʋəts] or [ʃɛnˈtoːʋəts]) is a settlement in the Municipality of Slovenska Bistrica in northeastern Slovenia. It lies in the hills just north of Slovenska Bistrica on the road towards Ritoznoj. The area is part of the traditional region of Styria. It is now included with the rest of the municipality in the Drava Statistical Region.
