= Farovec =

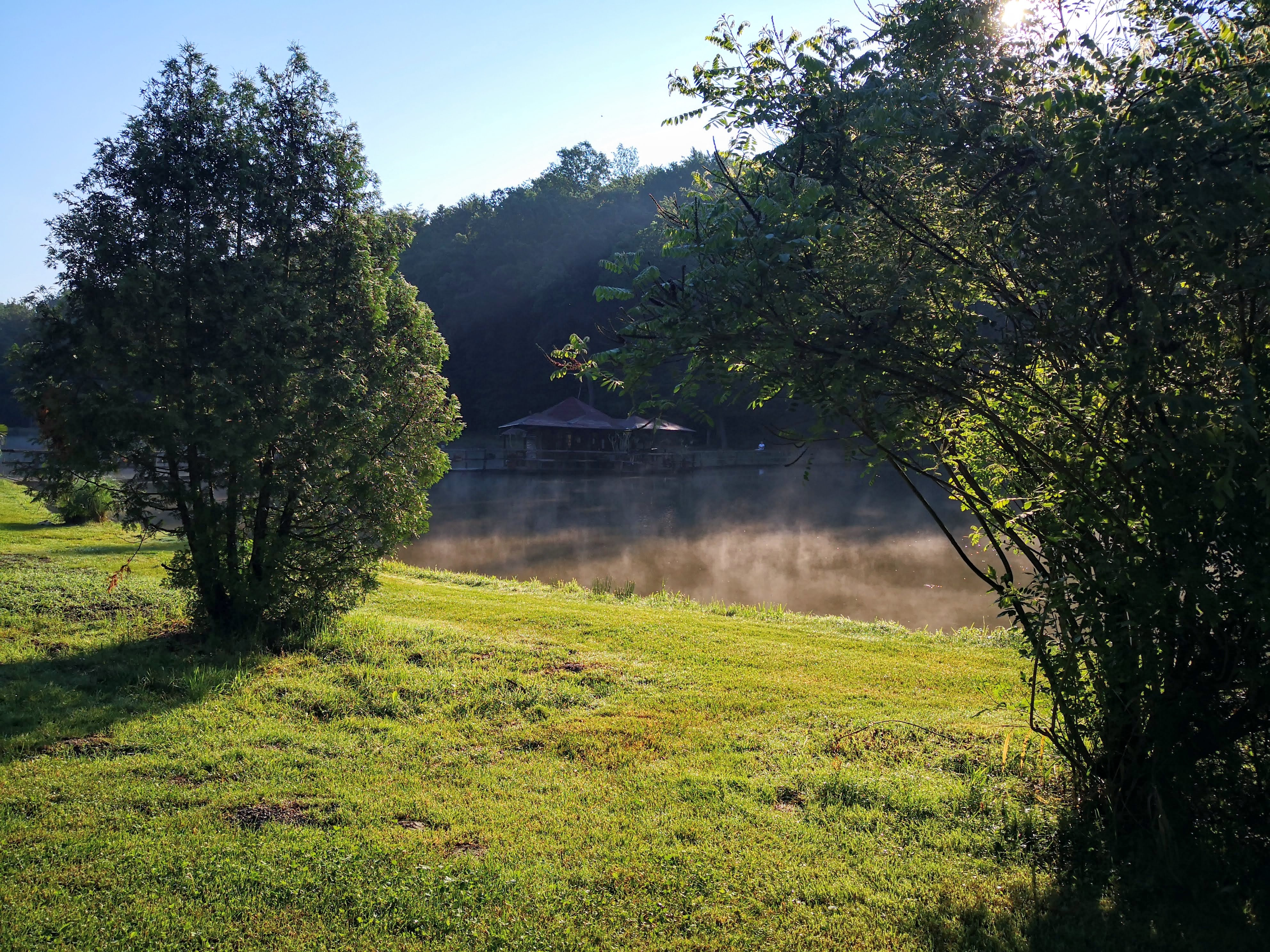
- A pond in Farovec

- Location in Slovenia
- Coordinates: 46°20′17.77″N 15°37′45.77″E
- Country: Slovenia
- Traditional region: Styria
- Statistical region: Drava
- Municipality: Slovenska Bistrica

Area
  - Total: 0.97 km^{2} (0.37 sq mi)
- Elevation: 265.9 m (872 ft)

Population (2002)
  - Total: 42

Farovec (pronounced [ˈfaːɾɔʋəts]) is a settlement on the Ložnica River in the Municipality of Slovenska Bistrica in northeastern Slovenia. The area is part of the traditional region of Styria. It is now included with the rest of the municipality in the Drava Statistical Region.
