= Visole =

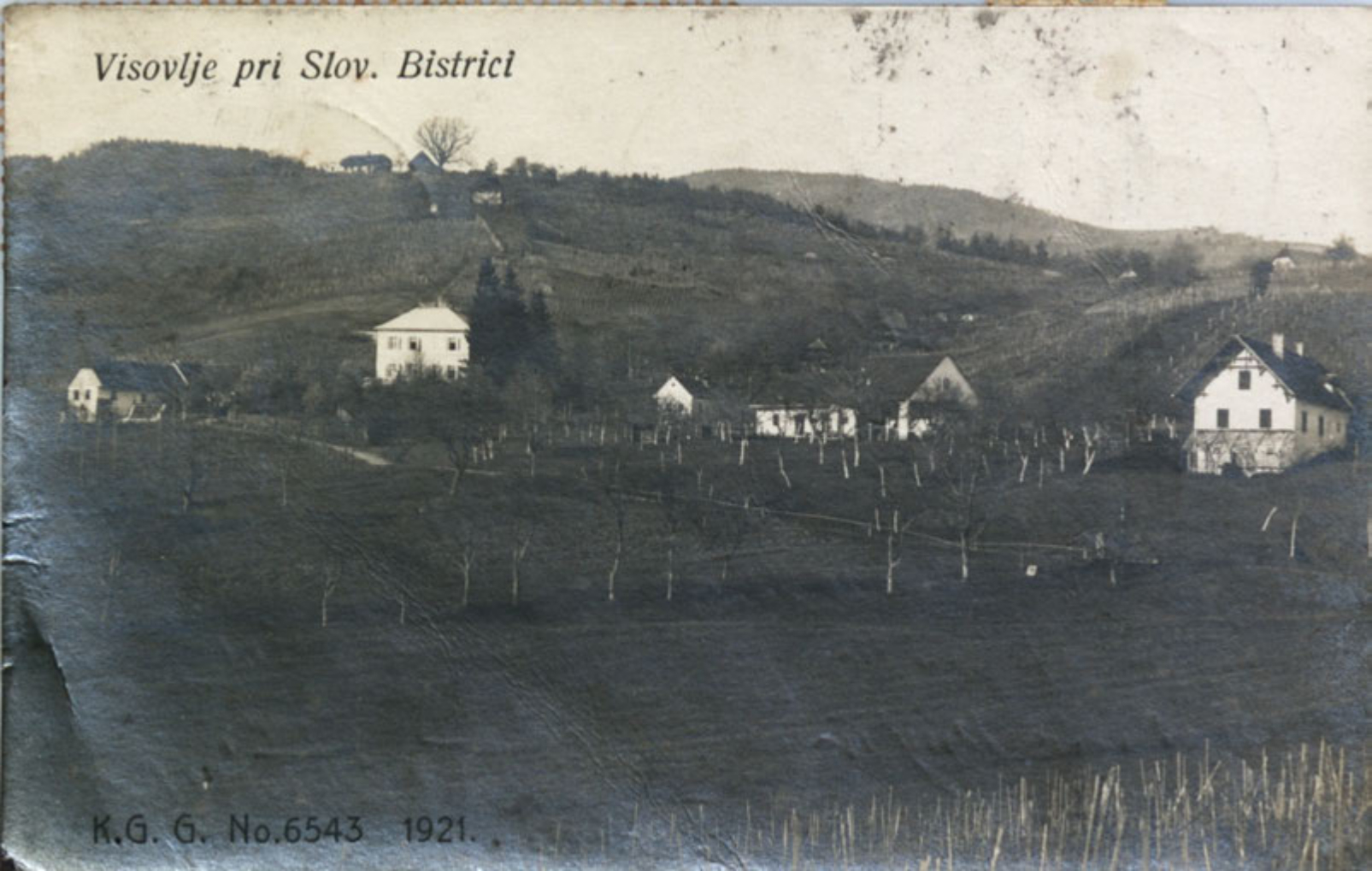
- 1922 postcard of Visole

- Location in Slovenia
- Coordinates: 46°24′1.22″N 15°31′57.21″E
- Country: Slovenia
- Traditional region: Styria
- Statistical region: Drava
- Municipality: Slovenska Bistrica

Area
  - Total: 1.96 km^{2} (0.76 sq mi)
- Elevation: 377 m (1,237 ft)

Population (2002)
  - Total: 500

Visole (pronounced [ˈʋiːsɔlɛ]) is a settlement in the Municipality of Slovenska Bistrica in northeastern Slovenia. It lies immediately northwest of the town of Slovenska Bistrica on the regional road leading to Tinje and the Pohorje range. The area is part of the traditional region of Styria. It is now included with the rest of the municipality in the Drava Statistical Region.
