= Kočno ob Ložnici =

- Location in Slovenia
- Coordinates: 46°20′11.58″N 15°36′52.38″E
- Country: Slovenia
- Traditional region: Styria
- Statistical region: Drava
- Municipality: Slovenska Bistrica

Area
  - Total: 2.32 km^{2} (0.90 sq mi)
- Elevation: 279.3 m (916 ft)

Population (2002)
  - Total: 150

Kočno ob Ložnici (pronounced [ˈkoːtʃnɔ ɔp lɔˈʒniːtsi], sometimes Kočno pri Ložnici) is a village on the right bank of the Ložnica River in the Municipality of Slovenska Bistrica in northeastern Slovenia. The area is part of the traditional region of Styria. It is now included with the rest of the municipality in the Drava Statistical Region.

== Name ==
The name of the settlement was changed from Kočno to Kočno ob Ložnici in 1953.

== Landmarks ==
=== St. Giles's Church ===
The church dedicated to St. Giles (Slovene: sv. Egidij) in Kočno was first mentioned in 1545. It is a typical example of a fortified church surrounded by walls, dominating the surrounding area. The church was erected when intense building of chapels of ease started. Later, it was renovated several times. It is a single-nave church with a bell tower in front of the entrance. The exterior is simple. The high altar with colonnade architecture is typically Baroque. The church contains works by Mihael Pogačnik, Franc Zemlik, and Jožef Straub from the first half of the 18th century.

=== Slamnik Hayrack ===
The Slamnik Hayrack is an example of a double hayrack, which is very rare for this part of Slovenia. The hayrack is an oak structure covered with red brick. It was built in 1884 by carpenters from Šentjur, who took three months to complete the carpentry and construction work. The structure is covered in wooden latticework. In the past, it was used for drying hay, and today, it is used to store farm tools and machinery.
