= Klopce, Slovenska Bistrica =

Klopce
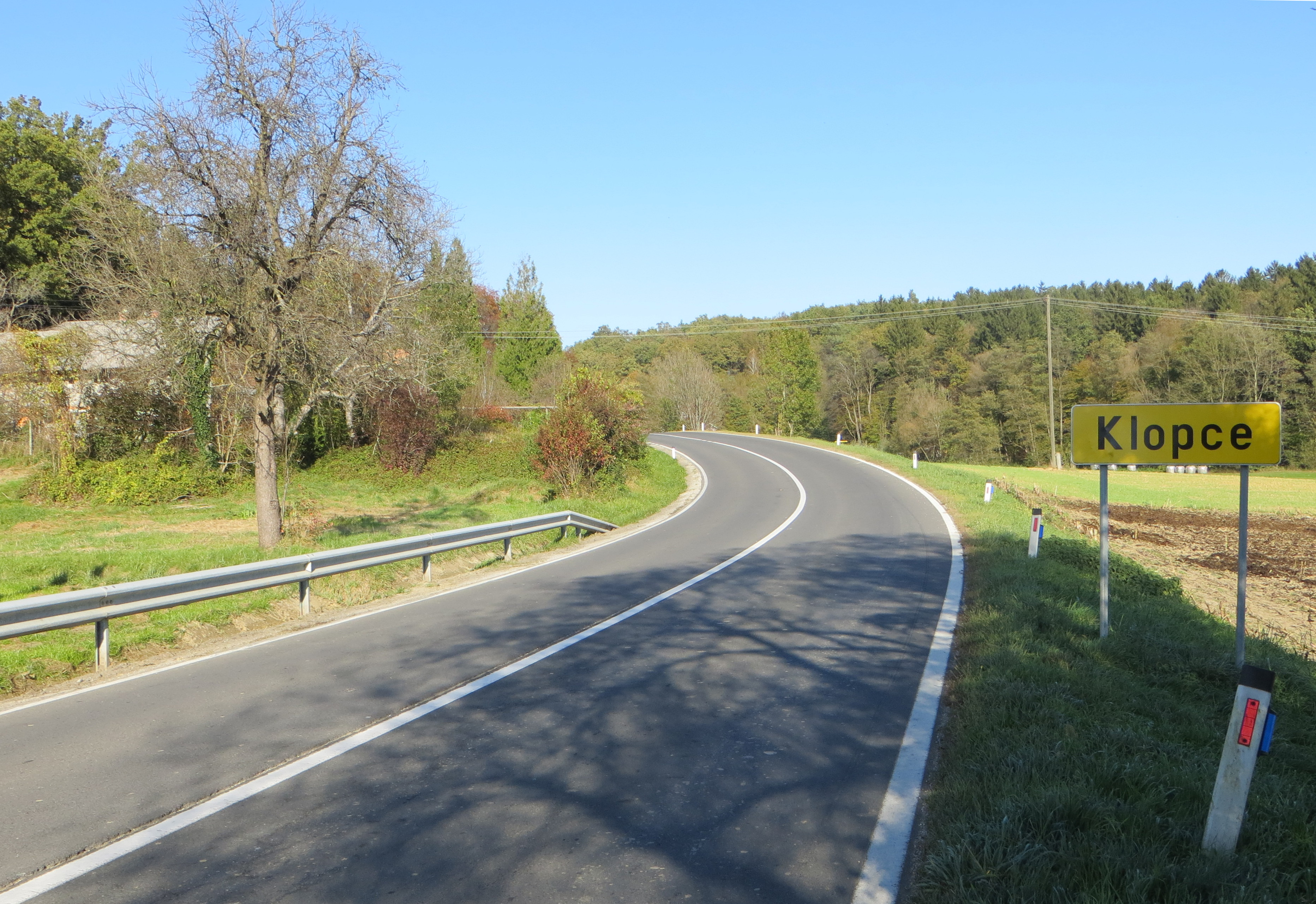

- Location in Slovenia
- Coordinates: 46°24′33.92″N 15°35′54.93″E
- Country: Slovenia
- Traditional region: Styria
- Statistical region: Drava
- Municipality: Slovenska Bistrica

Area
  - Total: 1.3 km^{2} (0.50 sq mi)
- Elevation: 309.5 m (1,015 ft)

Population (2002)
  - Total: 165

Klopce (pronounced [ˈkloːptsɛ]) is a settlement in the Municipality of Slovenska Bistrica in northeastern Slovenia. It lies north of the A1 motorway from Ljubljana to Maribor, immediately northeast of Slovenska Bistrica on the regional road towards Zgornja Polskava. The area is part of the traditional region of Styria. It is now included with the rest of the municipality in the Drava Statistical Region.
