= Pretrež =

- Location in Slovenia
- Coordinates: 46°20′57.98″N 15°37′36.87″E
- Country: Slovenia
- Traditional region: Styria
- Statistical region: Drava
- Municipality: Slovenska Bistrica

Area
  - Total: 3.55 km^{2} (1.37 sq mi)
- Elevation: 306.2 m (1,005 ft)

Population (2002)
  - Total: 155

Pretrež (pronounced [ˈpɾeːtɾɛʃ]) is a settlement on the left bank of the Ložnica River in the Municipality of Slovenska Bistrica in northeastern Slovenia. The area is part of the traditional region of Styria. It is now included with the rest of the municipality in the Drava Statistical Region.
