= Razgor pri Žabljeku =

- Location in Slovenia
- Coordinates: 46°20′27.91″N 15°33′16.04″E
- Country: Slovenia
- Traditional region: Styria
- Statistical region: Drava
- Municipality: Slovenska Bistrica

Area
  - Total: 1.68 km^{2} (0.65 sq mi)
- Elevation: 298.6 m (980 ft)

Population (2002)
  - Total: 94

Razgor pri Žabljeku (pronounced [ˈɾaːzɡɔɾ pɾi ˈʒaːbljɛku]) is a settlement in the Municipality of Slovenska Bistrica in northeastern Slovenia. It lies just off the regional road leading south from Slovenska Bistrica to Poljčane. The area is part of the traditional region of Styria. It is now included with the rest of the municipality in the Drava Statistical Region. The settlement includes the hamlet of Rožna Dolina.

== Name ==
The settlement was first attested in written sources in 1261 as Razwor (and as Rasbor and Razbor in 1395, Rasmar in 1436, and Rasbar in 1444). The name of the settlement was originally *Razor, from the Slovene common noun razor 'dead furrow' (cf. also Razori). The name later diphthongized to (genitive) *Razu̯or(a), followed by the change -zu̯- > -zg-, which is also found in western Slovene dialects.

== History ==
The area was already settled in antiquity, as indicated by the discovery of a prehistoric iron one-sided winged ax. Before the Second World War, the settlement was a hamlet of Žabljek. During the war, ten Partisans were killed while destroying the nearby railroad.
