= Cezlak =

- Village
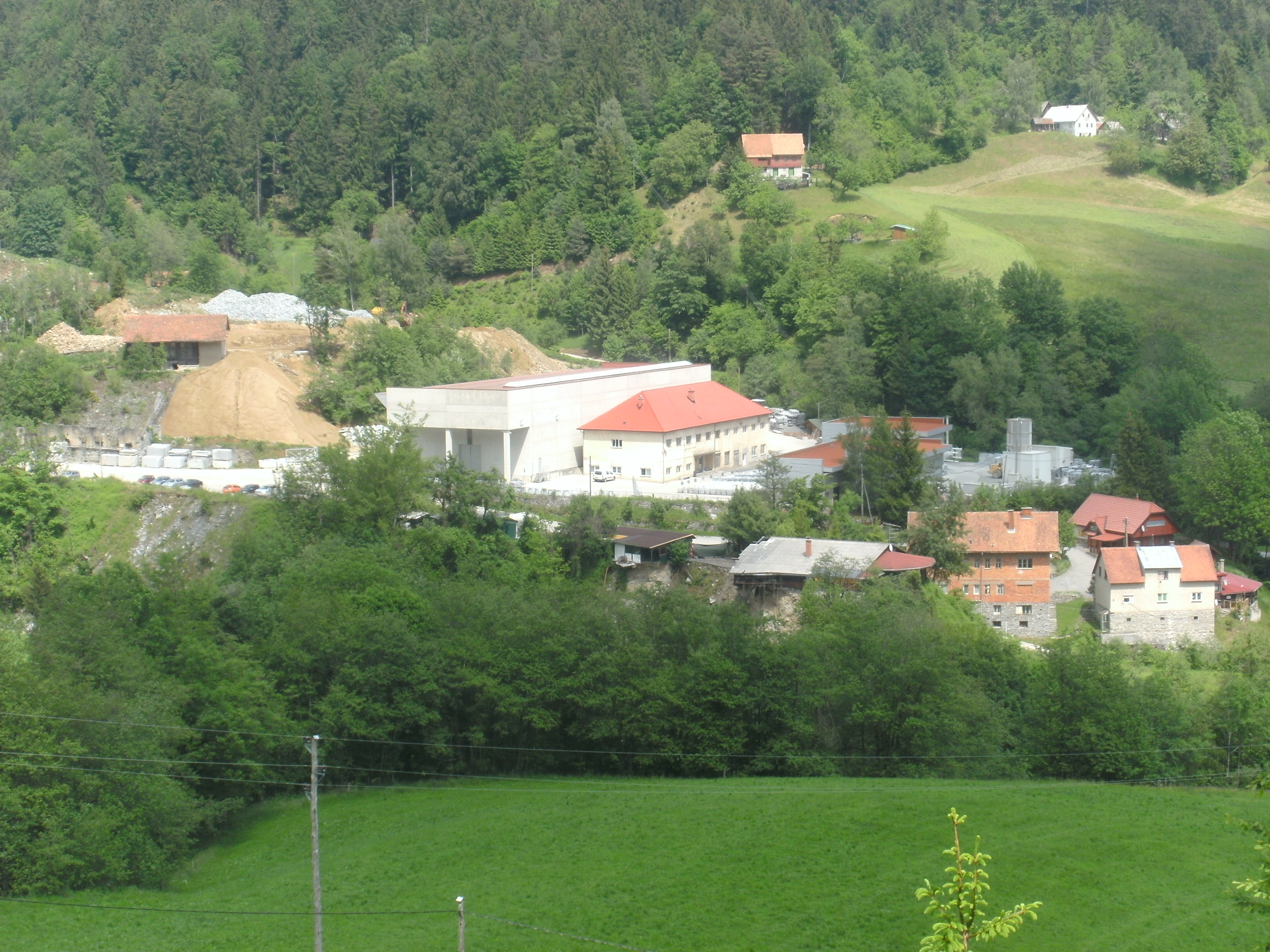

- Location in Slovenia
- Coordinates: 46°25′1.8″N 15°26′20.61″E
- Country: Slovenia
- Traditional region: Styria
- Statistical region: Drava
- Municipality: Slovenska Bistrica

Area
  - Total: 0.34 km^{2} (0.13 sq mi)
- Elevation: 580.6 m (1,905 ft)

Population (2002)
  - Total: 48

Cezlak (pronounced [tsɛˈzlaːk]) is a small settlement on the southern slope of the Pohorje range in the Municipality of Slovenska Bistrica in northeastern Slovenia. The area is part of the traditional region of Styria. It is now included with the rest of the municipality in the Drava Statistical Region.

== Cultural heritage ==
There is a small roadside chapel in the settlement. It was built in 1898.

== Mineralogy ==
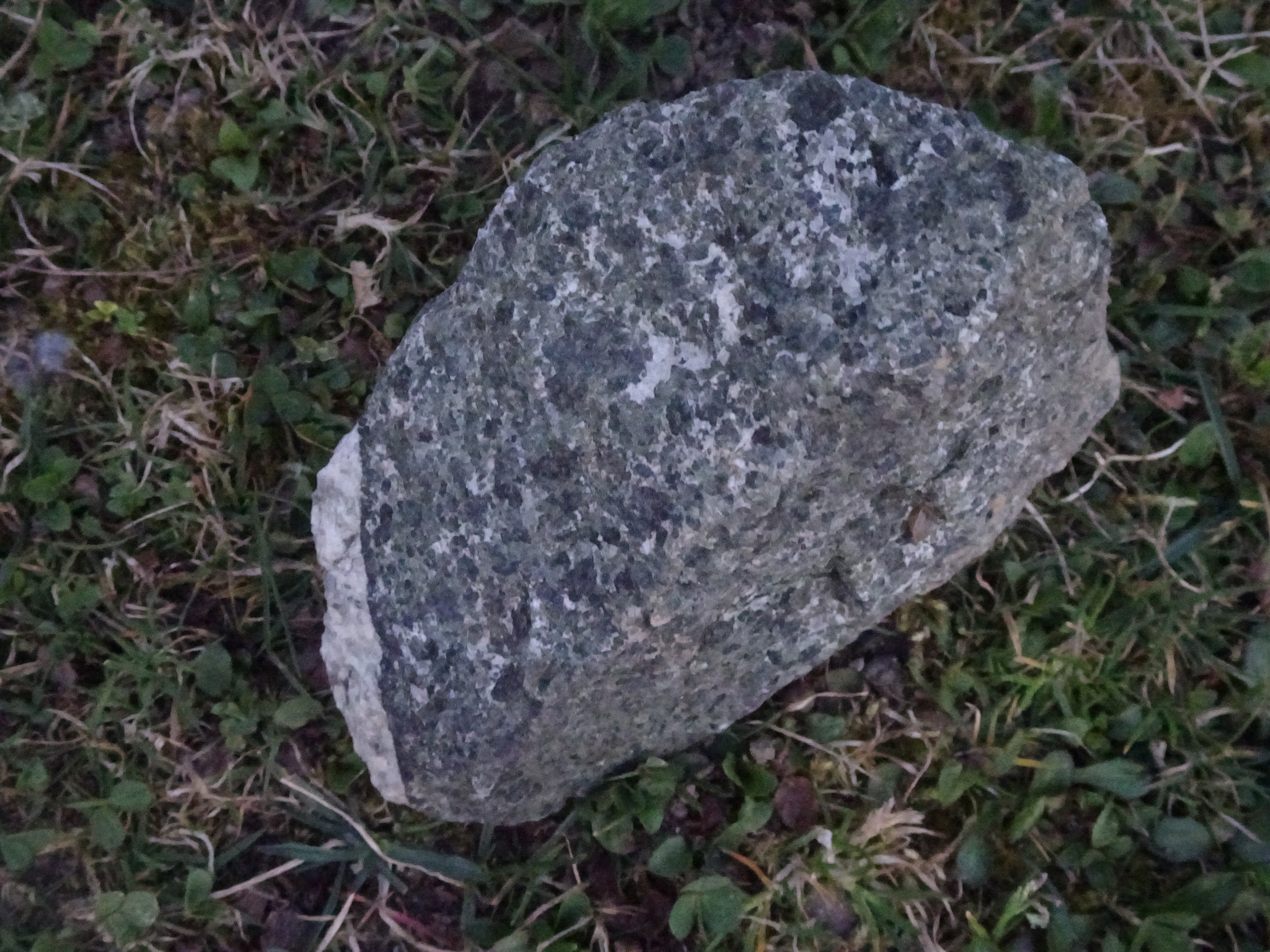
Cizlakite sample

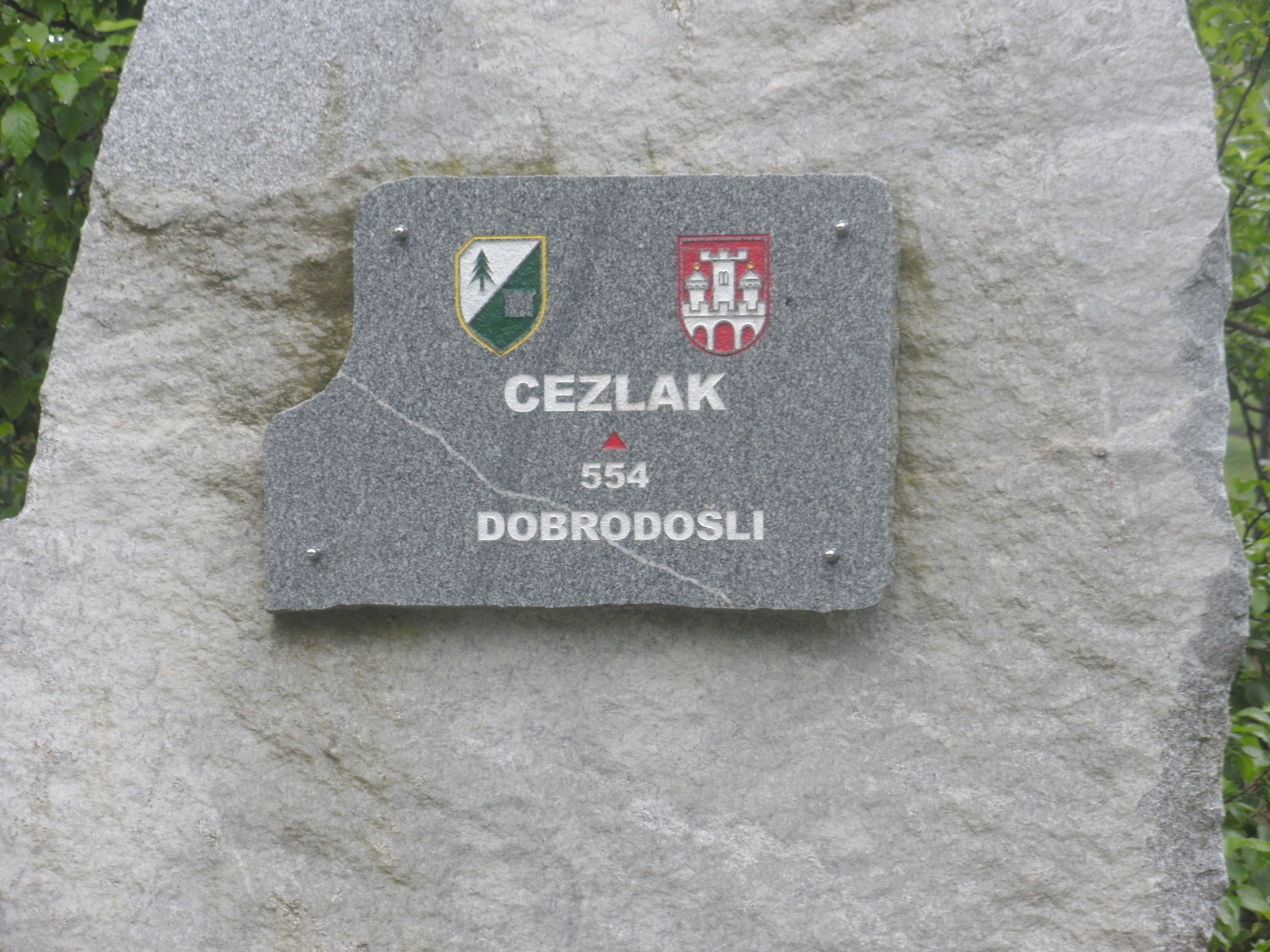
Cezlak inscription on a granodiorite stone

Since the beginning of 20th century, a granodiorite quarry has been operating there, once used mostly for setts for roads and squares. The only known deposit of cizlakite (quartz monzogabbro, a green plutonic rock) in the world has been found near Cezlak.
