= Ošelj =

- Location in Slovenia
- Coordinates: 46°26′30.27″N 15°31′16.5″E
- Country: Slovenia
- Traditional region: Styria
- Statistical region: Drava
- Municipality: Slovenska Bistrica

Area
  - Total: 3.26 km^{2} (1.26 sq mi)
- Elevation: 774.1 m (2,540 ft)

Population (2002)
  - Total: 75

Ošelj (pronounced [ˈoːʃəl]) is a settlement in the Pohorje Hills in the Municipality of Slovenska Bistrica in northeastern Slovenia. The area is part of the traditional region of Styria. It is now included with the rest of the municipality in the Drava Statistical Region.
