= Spodnja Ložnica =

- Location in Slovenia
- Coordinates: 46°22′52.96″N 15°32′19.94″E
- Country: Slovenia
- Traditional region: Styria
- Statistical region: Drava
- Municipality: Slovenska Bistrica

Area
  - Total: 3.1 km^{2} (1.2 sq mi)
- Elevation: 274.1 m (899 ft)

Population (2002)
  - Total: 181

Spodnja Ložnica (pronounced [ˈspoːdnja lɔˈʒniːtsa]) is a village in the Municipality of Slovenska Bistrica in northeastern Slovenia. The area is part of the traditional region of Styria. It is now included with the rest of the municipality in the Drava Statistical Region.

A small chapel with a small wooden belfry in the centre of the settlement was built in 1890 on the site of an earlier smaller chapel.
