= Vrhole pri Slovenskih Konjicah =

- Location in Slovenia
- Coordinates: 46°22′20.26″N 15°31′8.49″E
- Country: Slovenia
- Traditional region: Styria
- Statistical region: Drava
- Municipality: Slovenska Bistrica

Area
  - Total: 2.31 km^{2} (0.89 sq mi)
- Elevation: 352.4 m (1,156 ft)

Population (2002)
  - Total: 281

Vrhole pri Slovenskih Konjicah (pronounced [ʋəɾˈxoːlɛ pɾi slɔˈʋeːnskix kɔˈnjiːtsax], German: Verhole) is a settlement in the Municipality of Slovenska Bistrica in northeastern Slovenia. It lies on the old main road roughly halfway between Slovenska Bistrica and Slovenjske Konjice. The area is part of the traditional region of Styria. It is now included with the rest of the municipality in the Drava Statistical Region.

== Name ==
The name of the settlement was changed from Vrhole to Vrhole pri Slovenskih Konjicah in 1953.
