= Preloge, Slovenska Bistrica =

Preloge
- Location in Slovenia
- Coordinates: 46°21′57.54″N 15°30′5.58″E
- Country: Slovenia
- Traditional region: Styria
- Statistical region: Drava
- Municipality: Slovenska Bistrica

Area
  - Total: 2.49 km^{2} (0.96 sq mi)
- Elevation: 364.3 m (1,195 ft)

Population (2002)
  - Total: 151

Preloge (pronounced [ˈpɾeːlɔɡɛ]) is a settlement in the Municipality of Slovenska Bistrica in northeastern Slovenia. It lies on the regional road leading southwest from Slovenska Bistrica to Slovenske Konjice. The area is part of the traditional region of Styria. It is now included with the rest of the municipality in the Drava Statistical Region.
