= Spodnje Prebukovje =

- Location in Slovenia
- Coordinates: 46°25′23.48″N 15°33′45.74″E
- Country: Slovenia
- Traditional region: Styria
- Statistical region: Drava
- Municipality: Slovenska Bistrica

Area
  - Total: 1.23 km^{2} (0.47 sq mi)
- Elevation: 501.4 m (1,645 ft)

Population (2002)
  - Total: 149

Spodnje Prebukovje (pronounced [ˈspoːdnjɛ ˈpɾeːbukɔu̯jɛ]) is a settlement in the hills just north of Slovenska Bistrica in northeastern Slovenia. The area is part of the traditional region of Styria. It is now included with the rest of the Municipality of Slovenska Bistrica in the Drava Statistical Region.
