= Brezje pri Slovenski Bistrici =

- Location in Slovenia
- Coordinates: 46°21′13.87″N 15°38′30.85″E
- Country: Slovenia
- Traditional region: Styria
- Statistical region: Drava
- Municipality: Slovenska Bistrica

Area
  - Total: 0.49 km^{2} (0.19 sq mi)
- Elevation: 277.4 m (910 ft)

Population (2002)
  - Total: 26

Brezje pri Slovenski Bistrici (pronounced [ˈbɾeːzjɛ pɾi slɔˈʋeːnski ˈbiːstɾitsi]) is a small settlement in the Municipality of Slovenska Bistrica in northeastern Slovenia. The area is part of the traditional region of Styria. It is now included with the rest of the municipality in the Drava Statistical Region.

== Name ==
The name of the settlement was changed from Brezje to Brezje pri Slovenski Bistrici in 1953.
