= Devina =

- Location in Slovenia
- Coordinates: 46°27′27.53″N 15°34′34.79″E
- Country: Slovenia
- Traditional region: Styria
- Statistical region: Drava
- Municipality: Slovenska Bistrica

Area
  - Total: 1.45 km^{2} (0.56 sq mi)
- Elevation: 302.6 m (993 ft)

Population (2002)
  - Total: 212

Devina (pronounced [dɛˈʋiːna]) is a settlement immediately north of Slovenska Bistrica in northeastern Slovenia. The area is part of the traditional region of Styria. It is now included with the rest of the Municipality of Slovenska Bistrica in the Drava Statistical Region.

A small chapel in the village centre was built in 1947 in memory of four locals who died fighting in the Second World War.
