= Vrhole pri Laporju =

- Location in Slovenia
- Coordinates: 46°19′15.36″N 15°37′26.81″E
- Country: Slovenia
- Traditional region: Styria
- Statistical region: Drava
- Municipality: Slovenska Bistrica

Area
  - Total: 2.59 km^{2} (1.00 sq mi)
- Elevation: 327.4 m (1,074 ft)

Population (2002)
  - Total: 150

Vrhole pri Laporju (pronounced [ʋəɾˈxoːlɛ pɾi ˈlaːpɔɾju]) is a settlement in the Municipality of Slovenska Bistrica in northeastern Slovenia. It lies in the hills northeast of Poljčane. The area is part of the traditional region of Styria. It is now included with the rest of the municipality in the Drava Statistical Region.

== Name ==
The name of the settlement was changed from Vrhole to Vrhole pri Laporju in 1953.
