= Kostanjevec =

- Location in Slovenia
- Coordinates: 46°23′40.34″N 15°30′50.53″E
- Country: Slovenia
- Traditional region: Styria
- Statistical region: Drava
- Municipality: Slovenska Bistrica

Area
  - Total: 2 km^{2} (0.77 sq mi)
- Elevation: 333.4 m (1,094 ft)

Population (2002)
  - Total: 286

Kostanjevec (pronounced [kɔˈstaːnjɛʋəts]) is a settlement in the hills west of Slovenska Bistrica in northeastern Slovenia. The area is part of the traditional region of Styria. It is now included with the rest of the Municipality of Slovenska Bistrica in the Drava Statistical Region.
