= Vinarje, Slovenska Bistrica =

Vinarje
- Location in Slovenia
- Coordinates: 46°22′17.67″N 15°29′54.07″E
- Country: Slovenia
- Traditional region: Styria
- Statistical region: Drava
- Municipality: Slovenska Bistrica

Area
  - Total: 2.09 km^{2} (0.81 sq mi)
- Elevation: 406 m (1,332 ft)

Population (2002)
  - Total: 233

Vinarje (pronounced [ʋiˈnaːɾjɛ]) is a settlement in the Municipality of Slovenska Bistrica in northeastern Slovenia. The area is part of the traditional region of Styria. It is now included with the rest of the municipality in the Drava Statistical Region.

The local church is dedicated to Saint Josse (Slovene: sveti Jošt) and belongs to the Parish of Prihova. It dates to the 16th century with 17th-century additions.
