= Rep, Slovenska Bistrica =

Rep
- Location in Slovenia
- Coordinates: 46°25′29.86″N 15°29′27.72″E
- Country: Slovenia
- Traditional region: Styria
- Statistical region: Drava
- Municipality: Slovenska Bistrica

Area
  - Total: 1.49 km^{2} (0.58 sq mi)
- Elevation: 827.5 m (2,715 ft)

Population (2002)
  - Total: 44

Rep (pronounced [ˈɾeːp]) is a small settlement in the Pohorje Hills in the Municipality of Slovenska Bistrica in northeastern Slovenia. The area is part of the traditional region of Styria. It is now included with the rest of the municipality in the Drava Statistical Region.

A small roadside chapel to the east of the village was built after the First World War in memory of a local soldier killed.
