= Križni Vrh, Slovenska Bistrica =

Križni Vrh
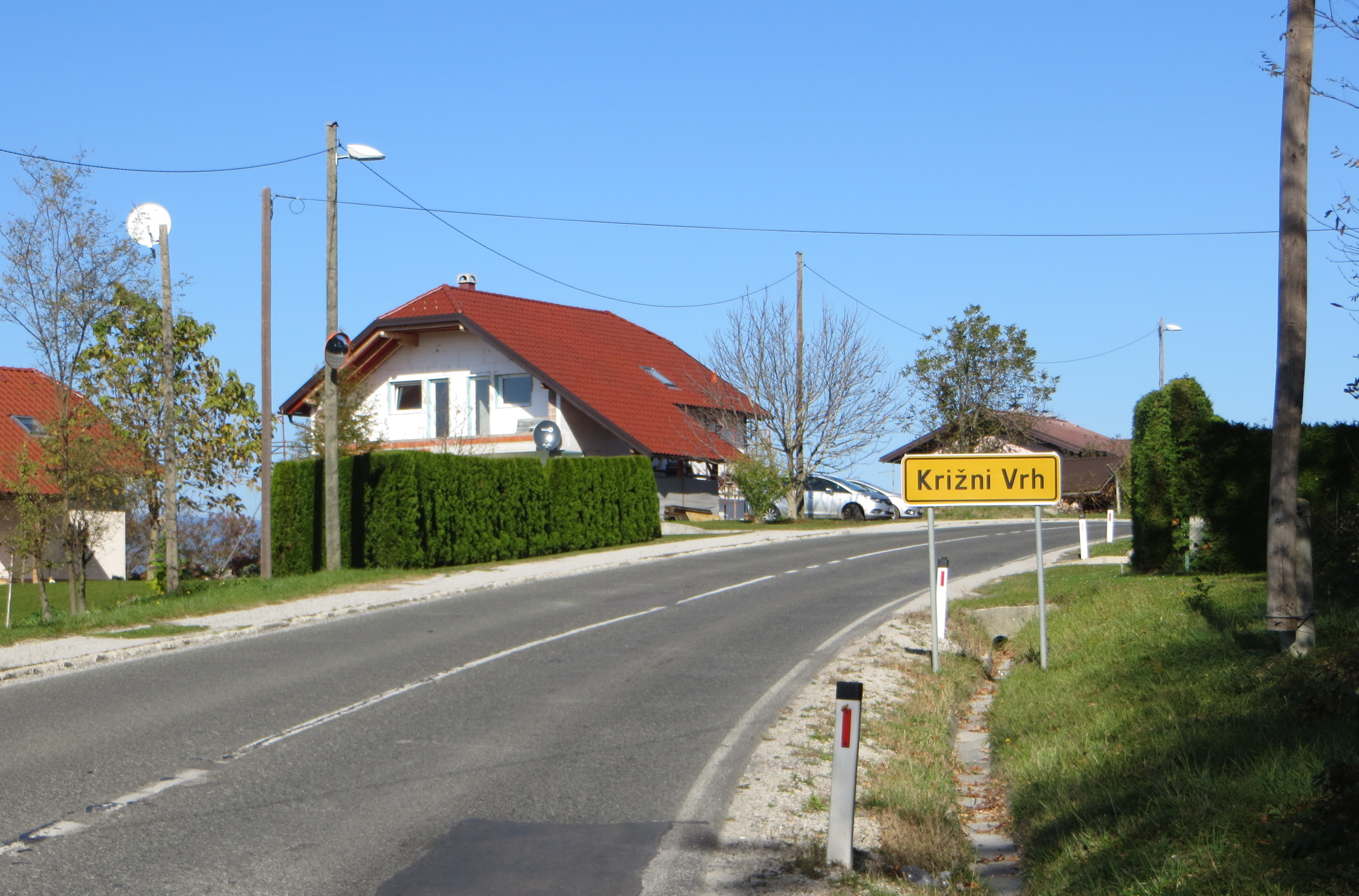

- Location in Slovenia
- Coordinates: 46°21′3.47″N 15°34′35.45″E
- Country: Slovenia
- Traditional region: Styria
- Statistical region: Drava
- Municipality: Slovenska Bistrica

Area
  - Total: 1.91 km^{2} (0.74 sq mi)
- Elevation: 275.6 m (904 ft)

Population (2002)
  - Total: 297

Križni Vrh (pronounced [ˈkɾiːʒni ˈʋəɾx]) is a settlement in the Municipality of Slovenska Bistrica in northeastern Slovenia. It lies on the main road south of Slovenska Bistrica towards Poljčane. The railway line from Ljubljana to Maribor runs along the western outskirts of the settlement. The area is part of the traditional region of Styria. It is now included with the rest of the municipality in the Drava Statistical Region.
