= Kočno pri Polskavi =

- Location in Slovenia
- Coordinates: 46°26′22.6″N 15°35′20.52″E
- Country: Slovenia
- Traditional region: Styria
- Statistical region: Drava
- Municipality: Slovenska Bistrica

Area
  - Total: 1.86 km^{2} (0.72 sq mi)
- Elevation: 481.4 m (1,579 ft)

Population (2002)
  - Total: 88

Kočno pri Polskavi (pronounced [ˈkoːtʃnɔ pɾi pɔlˈskaːʋi]) is a settlement in the foothills of the Pohorje range in the Municipality of Slovenska Bistrica in northeastern Slovenia. The area is part of the traditional region of Styria. It is now included with the rest of the municipality in the Drava Statistical Region.

== Name ==
The name of the settlement was changed from Kočno to Kočno pri Polskavi in 1953.

== Gromberk Castle ==
The ruins of Gromberk Castle (German: Grünberg) lie to the northwest of the settlement. It originated in the 10th century and was part of the estate of the Counts of Celje. It fell into disrepair after a peasant revolt in the late 17th century and relatively few remains are still visible today.
