= Zgornja Ložnica =

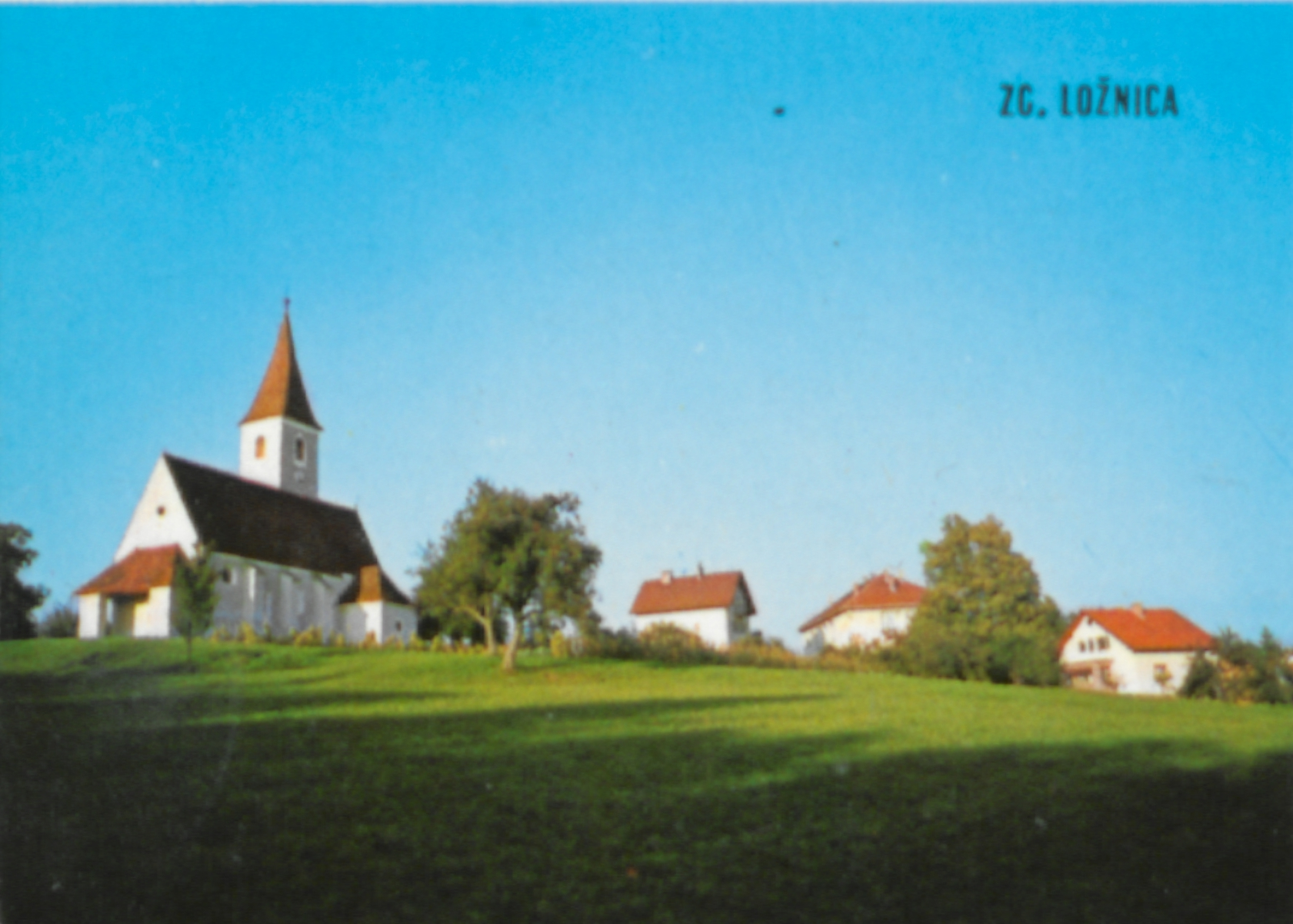
- 1973 postcard of Zgornja Ložnica

- Location in Slovenia
- Coordinates: 46°23′6.27″N 15°31′4.25″E
- Country: Slovenia
- Traditional region: Styria
- Statistical region: Drava
- Municipality: Slovenska Bistrica

Area
  - Total: 1.95 km^{2} (0.75 sq mi)
- Elevation: 320 m (1,050 ft)

Population (2002)
  - Total: 320

Zgornja Ložnica (pronounced [ˈzɡoːɾnja lɔˈʒniːtsa]) is a village in the Municipality of Slovenska Bistrica in northeastern Slovenia. The area is part of the traditional region of Styria. It is now included with the rest of the municipality in the Drava Statistical Region.

The parish church in the settlement is dedicated to Saint Wenceslas (Slovene: sveti Venčeslav) and belongs to the Roman Catholic Archdiocese of Maribor. It was built in the 13th century, during the rule of Ottokar II of Bohemia, who was also Duke of Styria in the mid-13th century. It is currently the only church in the territory of Slovenia dedicated to this saint after the church in Domanjševci was rededicated to Saint Martin. It had numerous additions over the following centuries.
