= Levič =

- Location in Slovenia
- Coordinates: 46°21′0.22″N 15°32′25.38″E
- Country: Slovenia
- Traditional region: Styria
- Statistical region: Drava
- Municipality: Slovenska Bistrica

Area
  - Total: 1.71 km^{2} (0.66 sq mi)
- Elevation: 301.7 m (990 ft)

Population (2002)
  - Total: 117

Levič (pronounced [ˈleːʋitʃ]) is a small village in the hills southwest of Slovenska Bistrica in northeastern Slovenia. The area is part of the traditional region of Styria. It is included with the rest of the Municipality of Slovenska Bistrica in the Drava Statistical Region.
