= Zgornja Brežnica =

- Location in Slovenia
- Coordinates: 46°20′16.51″N 15°34′34.95″E
- Country: Slovenia
- Traditional region: Styria
- Statistical region: Drava
- Municipality: Slovenska Bistrica

Area
  - Total: 0.88 km^{2} (0.34 sq mi)
- Elevation: 274.6 m (901 ft)

Population (2002)
  - Total: 69

Zgornja Brežnica (pronounced [ˈzɡoːɾnja bɾɛˈʒniːtsa]) is a settlement in the Municipality of Slovenska Bistrica in northeastern Slovenia. It lies on the main regional road from Slovenska Bistrica to Poljčane. The area is part of the traditional region of Styria. It is now included with the rest of the municipality in the Drava Statistical Region.
