= Jurišna Vas =

- Location in Slovenia
- Coordinates: 46°25′18.35″N 15°31′18.62″E
- Country: Slovenia
- Traditional region: Styria
- Statistical region: Drava
- Municipality: Slovenska Bistrica

Area
  - Total: 2.7 km^{2} (1.0 sq mi)
- Elevation: 716.1 m (2,349 ft)

Population (2002)
  - Total: 66

Jurišna Vas (pronounced [ˈjuːɾiʃna ˈʋaːs]; Slovene: Jurišna vas) is a village in the Pohorje Hills in the Municipality of Slovenska Bistrica in northeastern Slovenia. The area is part of the traditional region of Styria. It is now included with the rest of the municipality in the Drava Statistical Region.

A Late Roman settlement, the Ančnik hill fort, has been excavated near the present day settlement. It includes well-preserved foundations of a 1.5 metre thick defence wall, traces of a forge and residential buildings, all dating from the 4th century AD.
