= Urh, Slovenska Bistrica =

Urh Sveti Urh (until 1952)
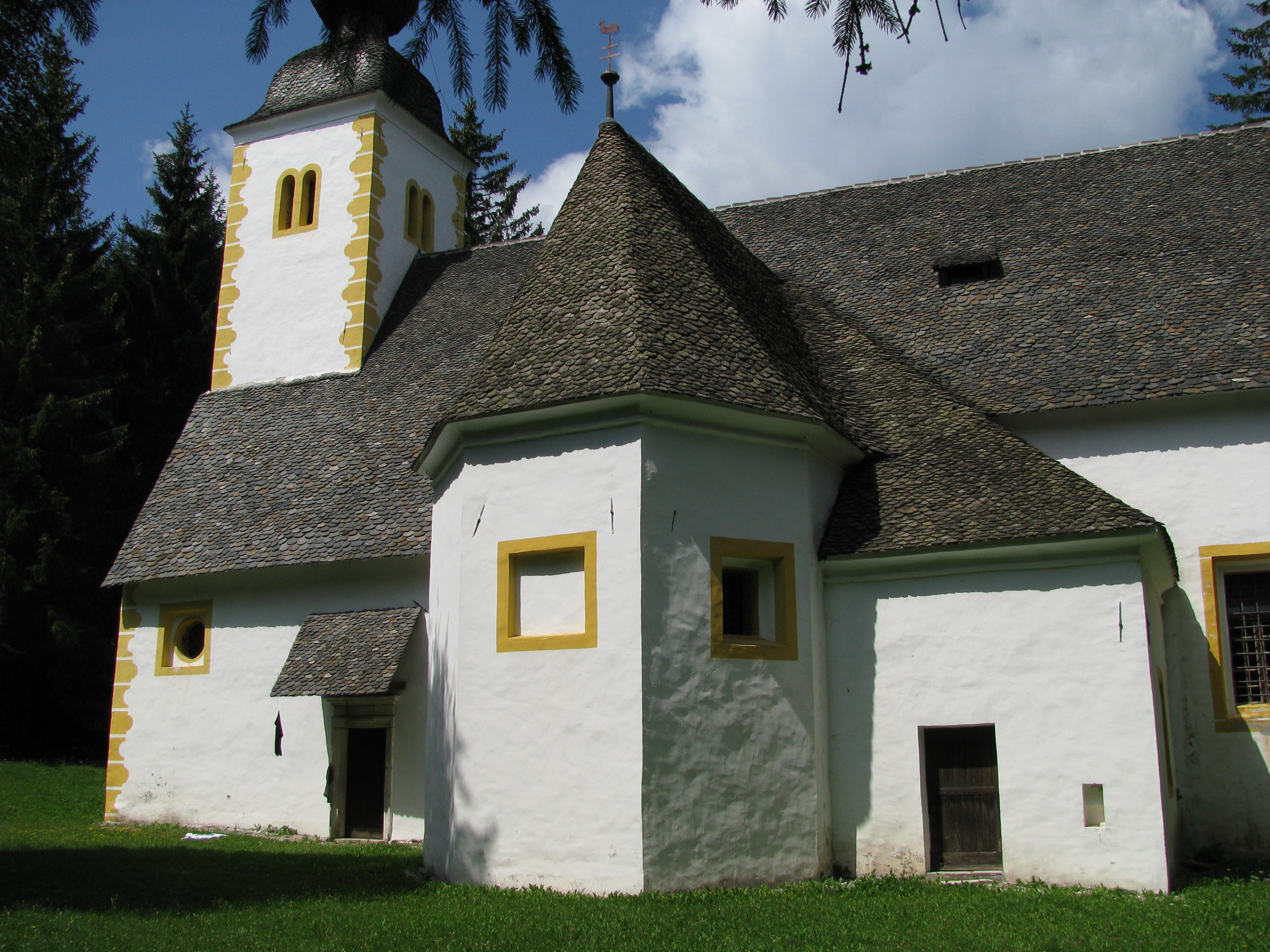

- Location in Slovenia
- Coordinates: 46°25′45.49″N 15°30′22.2″E
- Country: Slovenia
- Traditional region: Styria
- Statistical region: Drava
- Municipality: Slovenska Bistrica

Area
  - Total: 2.9 km^{2} (1.1 sq mi)
- Elevation: 899.8 m (2,952 ft)

Population (2002)
  - Total: 69

Urh (pronounced [ˈuːɾx], formerly Sveti Urh, in older sources also Sveti Orih, German: St. Ulrich) is a small settlement in the Pohorje Hills in the Municipality of Slovenska Bistrica in northeastern Slovenia. The area is part of the traditional region of Styria. It is now included with the rest of the municipality in the Drava Statistical Region.

== Name ==
The name of the settlement was changed from Sveti Urh (literally, 'Saint Ulrich') to Urh (literally, 'Ulrich') in 1952. The name was changed on the basis of the 1948 Law on Names of Settlements and Designations of Squares, Streets, and Buildings as part of efforts by Slovenia's postwar communist government to remove religious elements from toponyms.

== Church ==
The local church, from which the settlement gets its name, is dedicated to Saint Ulrich (Slovene: sveti Urh) and belongs to the Parish of Tinje. It dates to the 17th century.
