= Modrič, Slovenska Bistrica =

Modrič
- Location in Slovenia
- Coordinates: 46°24′35.43″N 15°28′14.18″E
- Country: Slovenia
- Traditional region: Styria
- Statistical region: Drava
- Municipality: Slovenska Bistrica

Area
  - Total: 2.79 km^{2} (1.08 sq mi)
- Elevation: 668.9 m (2,195 ft)

Population (2002)
  - Total: 134

Modrič (pronounced [ˈmoːdɾitʃ]) is a village in the Pohorje Hills in the Municipality of Slovenska Bistrica in northeastern Slovenia. The area is part of the traditional region of Styria. It is now included with the rest of the municipality in the Drava Statistical Region.

A small chapel in the village centre was built in 1863.

In 1893 an Ancient Roman archaeological site was excavated near the settlement and remains of a Mithraeum were discovered.
