= Kot na Pohorju =

Kot na Pohorju Kot (until 1998)
- Location in Slovenia
- Coordinates: 46°26′14.77″N 15°26′3.91″E
- Country: Slovenia
- Traditional region: Styria
- Statistical region: Drava
- Municipality: Slovenska Bistrica

Area
  - Total: 11.12 km^{2} (4.29 sq mi)
- Elevation: 1,131.4 m (3,712 ft)

Population (2002)
  - Total: 163

Kot na Pohorju (pronounced [ˈkóːt na ˈpóːxɔɾju]) is a dispersed settlement in the Municipality of Slovenska Bistrica in northeastern Slovenia. It lies in the Pohorje Hills north of Oplotnica. The area is part of the traditional region of Styria. It is now included with the rest of the municipality in the Drava Statistical Region.

== Name ==
The name Kot is shared by several villages in Slovenia. It comes from the common noun kot 'closed valley, combe', referring to the place where a valley ends, closed in by mountains or hills. Kot was renamed Kot na Pohorju in 1998.

== History ==
Kot na Pohorju was the location of fighting during the Second World War. A granite memorial to the Partisan brigades that fought there was erected on the site in 1965.
