= Podgrad na Pohorju =

Podgrad na Pohorju Podgrad (until 1998)
- Location in Slovenia
- Coordinates: 46°24′43.87″N 15°26′50.9″E
- Country: Slovenia
- Traditional region: Styria
- Statistical region: Drava
- Municipality: Slovenska Bistrica

Area
  - Total: 0.49 km^{2} (0.19 sq mi)
- Elevation: 671 m (2,201 ft)

Population (2002)
  - Total: 74

Podgrad na Pohorju (pronounced [pɔdˈɡɾáːt na ˈpóːxɔɾju, ˈpɔ̀ːdɡɾat -], in older sources also Pod Gradom, German: Unterschlossberg) is a small settlement in the Pohorje Hills in the Municipality of Slovenska Bistrica in northeastern Slovenia. The area is part of the traditional region of Styria. It is now included with the rest of the municipality in the Drava Statistical Region.

== Name ==
The settlement's name in Slovene is a fused prepositional phrase that has lost case inflection, and it means 'below the castle (in Pohorje)'. This refers to a 12th-century castle known as Zajčji grad, the ruins of which can still be seen on a hill east of the settlement. The name contrasts with that of neighboring Nadgrad (literally, 'above the castle'), which stands about 180 meters (590 ft) higher in elevation. The name of the settčement was changed from Podgrad to Podgrad na Pohorju in 1998.
