= Zgornja Nova Vas =

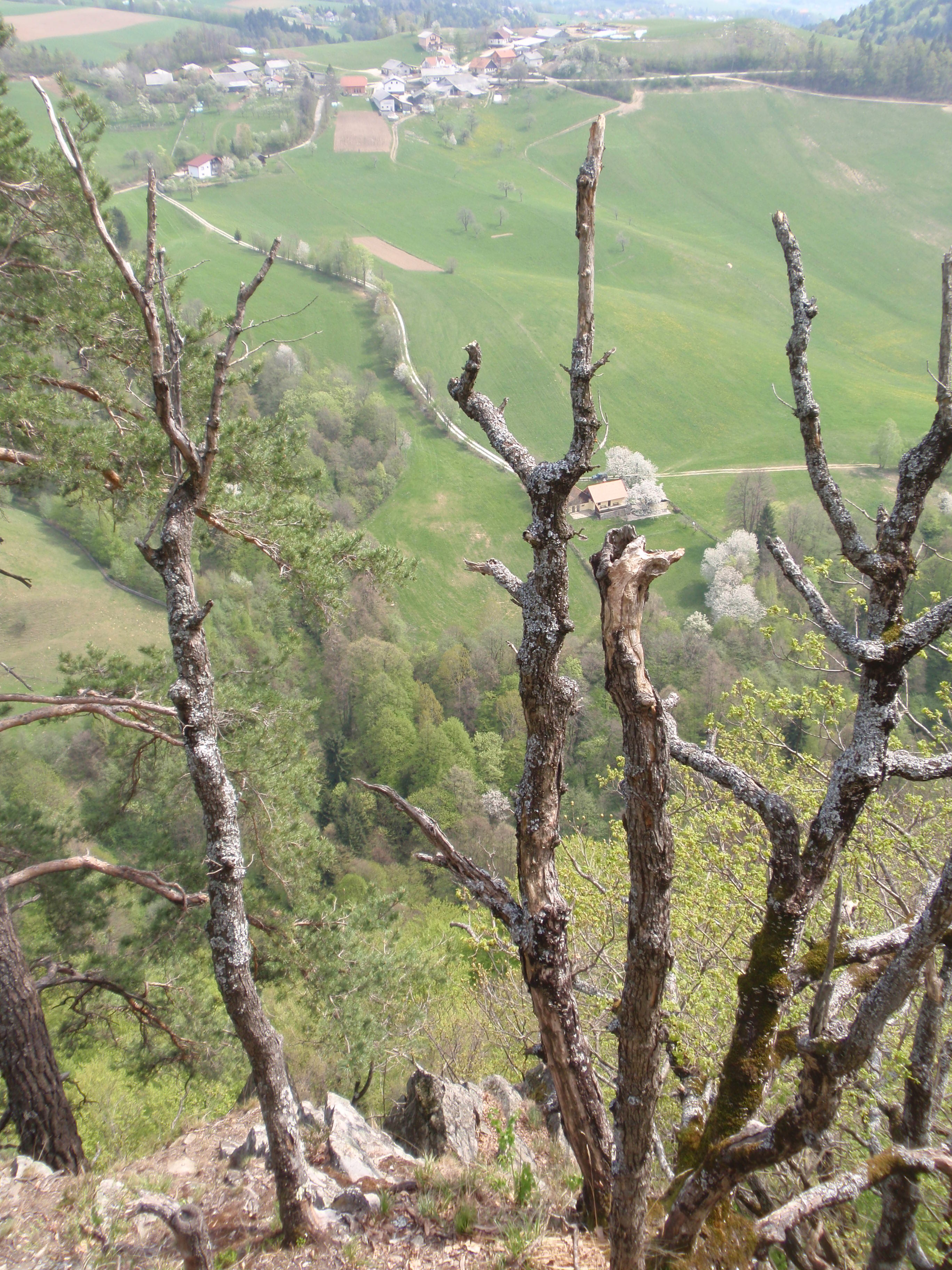

- Location in Slovenia
- Coordinates: 46°25′37.86″N 15°32′12.67″E
- Country: Slovenia
- Traditional region: Styria
- Statistical region: Drava
- Municipality: Slovenska Bistrica

Area
  - Total: 1.61 km^{2} (0.62 sq mi)
- Elevation: 613.8 m (2,014 ft)

Population (2002)
  - Total: 74

Zgornja Nova Vas (pronounced [ˈzɡoːɾnja ˈnɔːʋa ˈʋaːs]; Slovene: Zgornja Nova vas) is a small village in the Pohorje Hills north of Slovenska Bistrica in northeastern Slovenia. The area is part of the traditional region of Styria. It is now included with the rest of the municipality in the Drava Statistical Region.

A small chapel in the centre of the settlement dates to the mid-19th century.
