= Smrečno =

- Location in Slovenia
- Coordinates: 46°26′59.46″N 15°29′54.3″E
- Country: Slovenia
- Traditional region: Styria
- Statistical region: Drava
- Municipality: Slovenska Bistrica

Area
  - Total: 5.25 km^{2} (2.03 sq mi)
- Elevation: 853.2 m (2,799 ft)

Population (2002)
  - Total: 99

Smrečno (pronounced [ˈsmɾeːtʃnɔ]) is a dispersed settlement in the Pohorje Hills in the Municipality of Slovenska Bistrica in northeastern Slovenia. Traditionally the entire area was part of the Styria region. It is now included with the rest of the municipality in the Drava Statistical Region.
