= Tinjska Gora =

- Location in Slovenia
- Coordinates: 46°24′15.75″N 15°30′26.52″E
- Country: Slovenia
- Traditional region: Styria
- Statistical region: Drava
- Municipality: Slovenska Bistrica

Area
  - Total: 1.46 km^{2} (0.56 sq mi)
- Elevation: 497.9 m (1,634 ft)

Population (2002)
  - Total: 238

Tinjska Gora (pronounced [ˈtiːnska ˈɡɔːɾa]) is a settlement in the hills west of Slovenska Bistrica in northeastern Slovenia. The area is part of Styria. It is now included with the rest of the municipality in the Drava Statistical Region.
