= Trnovec pri Slovenski Bistrici =

- Location in Slovenia
- Coordinates: 46°21′20.14″N 15°39′8.35″E
- Country: Slovenia
- Traditional region: Styria
- Statistical region: Drava
- Municipality: Slovenska Bistrica

Area
  - Total: 2.89 km^{2} (1.12 sq mi)
- Elevation: 260.3 m (854 ft)

Population (2002)
  - Total: 91

Trnovec pri Slovenski Bistrici (pronounced [ˈtəɾnɔʋəts pɾi slɔˈʋeːnski ˈbiːstɾitsi]) is a small village in the Municipality of Slovenska Bistrica in northeastern Slovenia. The area is part of the traditional region of Styria. It is now included with the rest of the municipality in the Drava Statistical Region.
