= Hošnica =

- Location in Slovenia
- Coordinates: 46°19′38.02″N 15°35′27.38″E
- Country: Slovenia
- Traditional region: Styria
- Statistical region: Drava
- Municipality: Slovenska Bistrica

Area
  - Total: 2.86 km^{2} (1.10 sq mi)
- Elevation: 313.4 m (1,028 ft)

Population (2002)
  - Total: 193

Hošnica (pronounced [ˈxoːʃnitsa]) is a settlement in the Municipality of Slovenska Bistrica in northeastern Slovenia. It is part of the traditional region of Styria and is now included with the rest of the municipality in the Drava Statistical Region.
