= Nadgrad =

- Location in Slovenia
- Coordinates: 46°25′17.82″N 15°27′5.7″E
- Country: Slovenia
- Traditional region: Styra
- Statistical region: Drava
- Municipality: Slovenska Bistrica

Area
  - Total: 1.34 km^{2} (0.52 sq mi)
- Elevation: 851.4 m (2,793 ft)

Population (2002)
  - Total: 59

Nadgrad (pronounced [nadˈɡɾaːt] or [ˈnaːdɡɾat], in older sources also Nad Gradom, German: Oberschlossberg) is a dispersed settlement in the Pohorje Hills in the Municipality of Slovenska Bistrica in northeastern Slovenia. The area is part of the traditional region of Styria. It is now included with the rest of the municipality in the Drava Statistical Region.

== Name ==
The settlement's name in Slovene is a fused prepositional phrase that has lost case inflection, and it means 'above the castle'. This refers to a 12th-century castle known as Zajčji grad, the ruins of which can still be seen on a hill south of the settlement. The name contrasts with that of neighboring Podgrad (literally, 'below the castle'), which stands about 180 meters (590 ft) lower in elevation.
