= Žabljek =

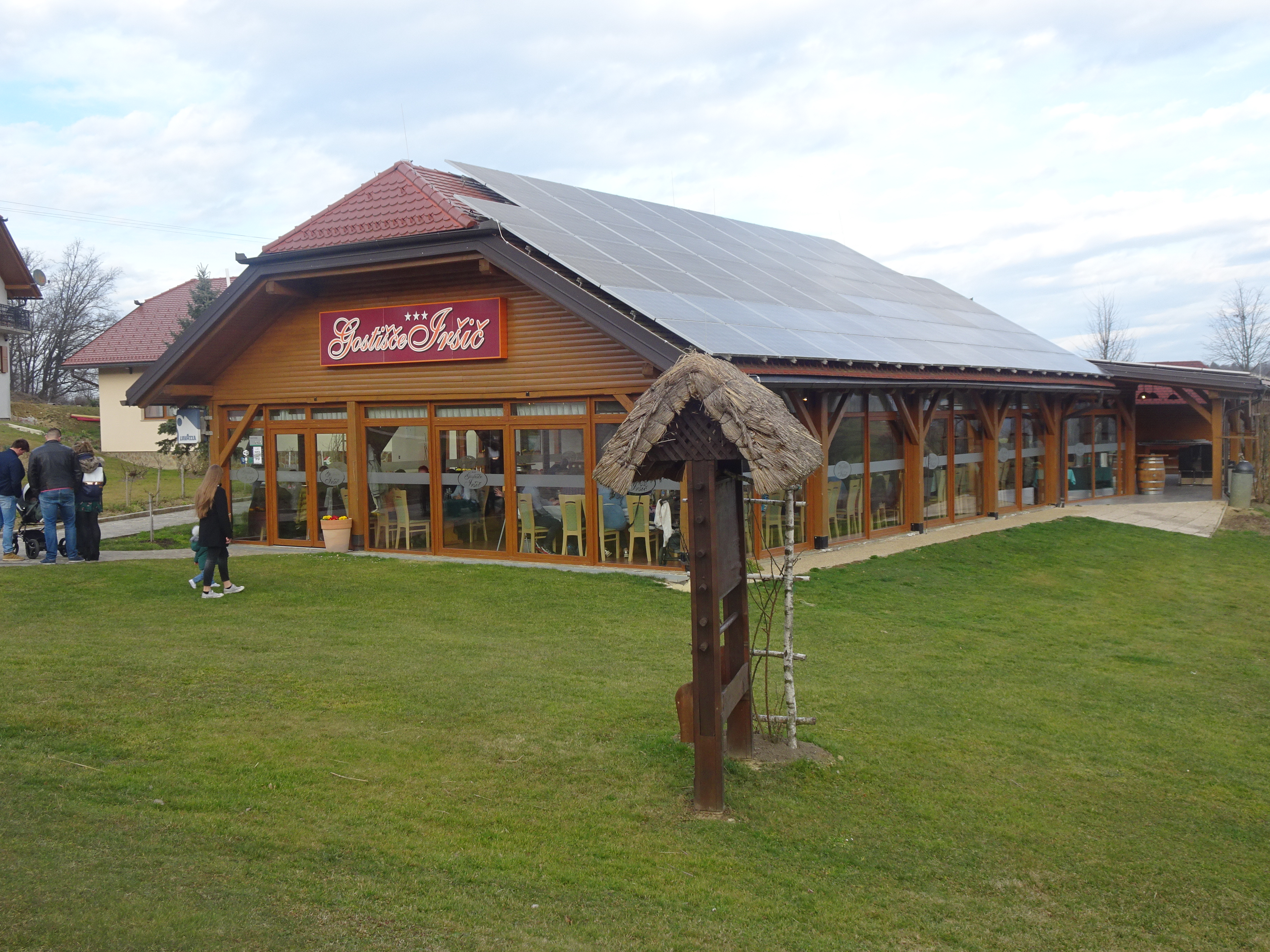

- Location in Slovenia
- Coordinates: 46°20′53.81″N 15°33′19.57″E
- Country: Slovenia
- Traditional region: Styria
- Statistical region: Drava
- Municipality: Slovenska Bistrica

Area
  - Total: 1.94 km^{2} (0.75 sq mi)
- Elevation: 300.4 m (986 ft)

Population (2002)
  - Total: 162

Žabljek (pronounced [ˈʒaːbljɛk]) is a village in the Municipality of Slovenska Bistrica in northeastern Slovenia. The area is part of the traditional region of Styria. It is now included with the rest of the municipality in the Drava Statistical Region.

A chapel in the centre of the settlement is dedicated to the Sacred Heart of Jesus and belongs to the Laporje parish.
