= Vrhloga =

- Location in Slovenia
- Coordinates: 46°21′48.08″N 15°37′55.23″E
- Country: Slovenia
- Traditional region: Styria
- Statistical region: Drava
- Municipality: Slovenska Bistrica

Area
  - Total: 2.77 km^{2} (1.07 sq mi)
- Elevation: 270.2 m (886 ft)

Population (2002)
  - Total: 211

Vrhloga (pronounced [ˈʋəɾxlɔɡa]) is a village in the Municipality of Slovenska Bistrica in northeastern Slovenia. The area is part of the traditional region of Styria. It is now included with the rest of the municipality in the Drava Statistical Region.

The village chapel with a small belfry was built after the First World War in gratitude for the safe return of a local soldier.
