= Frajhajm =

- Location in Slovenia
- Coordinates: 46°27′58.99″N 15°32′31.41″E
- Country: Slovenia
- Traditional region: Styria
- Statistical region: Drava
- Municipality: Slovenska Bistrica

Area
  - Total: 14.78 km^{2} (5.71 sq mi)
- Elevation: 753 m (2,470 ft)

Population (2002)
  - Total: 162

Frajhajm (pronounced [ˈfɾaːi̯xai̯m]) is a dispersed settlement in the Pohorje Hills in the Municipality of Slovenska Bistrica in northeastern Slovenia. The area is part of the traditional region of Styria. It is now included with the rest of the municipality in the Drava Statistical Region.

== Church ==
The local church is dedicated to Saint Henry (Slovene: sveti Areh) and belongs to the Parish of Sveti Martin na Pohorju. It dates to the 13th century with 16th- and 17th-century alterations.

== Mass graves ==
Frajhajm is the site of six known mass graves from the period immediately after the Second World War. They all contain the remains of civilian victims and prisoners of war that were brought from Maribor and the surrounding region and murdered in May and June 1945. The Ruše Lodge at Areh 1 Mass Grave (Slovene: Grobišče pri Ruški koči na Arehu 1) is located east of Saint Henry's Church. The Jure Saddle 1–3 mass graves (Jurjevo sedlo 1–3) are clustered together in the northeast part of the settlement on a slope below the Zarja Hotel. The local people have marked the site with two logs arranged in a cross shape. The first measures 12 by 2 meters (39.4 ft × 6.6 ft), the second 8 by 1.5 meters (26.2 ft × 4.9 ft), and the third 20 by 1 meter (65.6 ft × 3.3 ft). The Zarja 1 and 2 mass graves (Pod Zarjo 1, 2) also lie below the Zarja Hotel. The first is between the hotel and the main road, and the second is south of the main road.
