= Turiška Vas na Pohorju =

- Location in Slovenia
- Coordinates: 46°24′59.75″N 15°30′38.17″E
- Country: Slovenia
- Traditional region: Styria
- Statistical region: Drava
- Municipality: Slovenska Bistrica

Area
  - Total: 0.99 km^{2} (0.38 sq mi)
- Elevation: 688.4 m (2,259 ft)

Population (2002)
  - Total: 74

Turiška Vas na Pohorju (pronounced [tuˈɾiːʃka ˈʋáːs na ˈpóːxɔɾju]) is a small village in the Pohorje Hills in the Municipality of Slovenska Bistrica in northeastern Slovenia. The area is part of the traditional region of Styria. It is now included with the rest of the municipality in the Drava Statistical Region.

== Name ==
The name of the settlement was changed from Turiška vas to Turiška vas na Pohorju in 1955.

== Cultural heritage ==
A small roadside chapel-shrine in the village dates to the early 20th century.
