= Dolgi Vrh =

- Location in Slovenia
- Coordinates: 46°20′2.85″N 15°33′41.5″E
- Country: Slovenia
- Traditional region: Styria
- Statistical region: Drava
- Municipality: Slovenska Bistrica

Area
  - Total: 0.95 km^{2} (0.37 sq mi)
- Elevation: 313.7 m (1,029 ft)

Population (2002)
  - Total: 88

Dolgi Vrh (pronounced [ˈdoːu̯ɡi ˈʋəɾx]) is a settlement in the Pohorje Hills in the Municipality of Slovenska Bistrica in northeastern Slovenia. It lies south of Slovenska Bistrica itself. The railway line from Ljubljana to Maribor runs along the eastern edge of the settlement. The area is part of the traditional region of Styria. It is now included with the rest of the municipality in the Drava Statistical Region.
