= Videž =

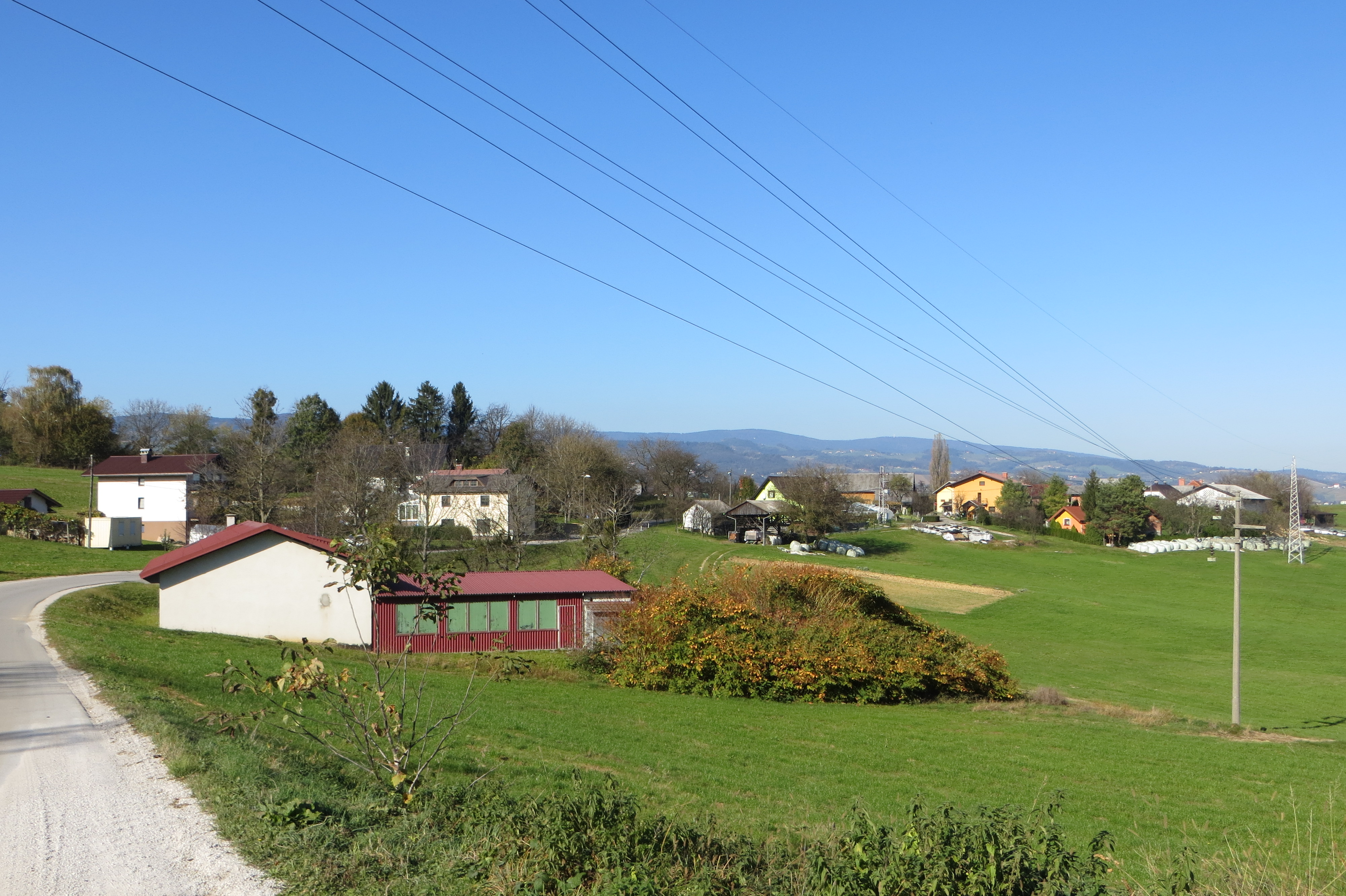

- Location in Slovenia
- Coordinates: 46°21′29.32″N 15°33′43.32″E
- Country: Slovenia
- Traditional region: Styria
- Statistical region: Drava
- Municipality: Slovenska Bistrica

Area
  - Total: 1.9 km^{2} (0.73 sq mi)
- Elevation: 301.7 m (990 ft)

Population (2002)
  - Total: 157

Videž (pronounced [ˈʋiːdɛʃ]) is a village south of Slovenska Bistrica in northeastern Slovenia. It lies just off the regional road leading south of Slovenska Bistrica to Poljčane. The area is part of the traditional region of Styria. It is now included with the rest of the Municipality of Slovenska Bistrica in the Drava Statistical Region.
