= Gladomes =

- Location in Slovenia
- Coordinates: 46°23′22.02″N 15°29′50.26″E
- Country: Slovenia
- Traditional region: Styria
- Statistical region: Drava
- Municipality: Slovenska Bistrica

Area
  - Total: 2.09 km^{2} (0.81 sq mi)
- Elevation: 329.9 m (1,082 ft)

Population (2002)
  - Total: 360

Gladomes (pronounced [ɡladɔˈmɛs]) is a settlement in the hills west of Slovenska Bistrica in northeastern Slovenia. The area is part of the traditional region of Styria. It is now included with the rest of the Municipality of Slovenska Bistrica in the Drava Statistical Region.

Close to the settlement archaeological remains of a Roman villa rustica have been discovered. The foundations of the buildings are preserved and artefacts from the site include numerous pot sherds.
