= Sevec =

- Location in Slovenia
- Coordinates: 46°21′34.95″N 15°31′0.11″E
- Country: Slovenia
- Traditional region: Styria
- Statistical region: Drava
- Municipality: Slovenska Bistrica

Area
  - Total: 1.48 km^{2} (0.57 sq mi)
- Elevation: 322.7 m (1,059 ft)

Population (2002)
  - Total: 49

Sevec (pronounced [ˈseːʋəts], German: Sewetz) is a small settlement in the municipality of Slovenska Bistrica in northeastern Slovenia. The main motorway from Ljubljana to Maribor runs along the northern outskirts of the settlement. The area is part of the traditional region of Styria. It is now included with the rest of the municipality in the Drava statistical region.
