= Fošt =

- Location in Slovenia
- Coordinates: 46°24′8.22″N 15°29′31.2″E
- Country: Slovenia
- Traditional region: Styria
- Statistical region: Drava
- Municipality: Slovenska Bistrica

Area
  - Total: 0.97 km^{2} (0.37 sq mi)
- Elevation: 471.9 m (1,548 ft)

Population (2002)
  - Total: 79

Fošt (pronounced [ˈfoːʃt]) is a settlement in the foothills of the Pohorje range west of Slovenska Bistrica in northeastern Slovenia. The area is part of the traditional region of Styria. It is now included with the rest of the Municipality of Slovenska Bistrica in the Drava Statistical Region.
