= Zgornja Bistrica =

- Location in Slovenia
- Coordinates: 46°24′9.96″N 15°32′39.9″E
- Country: Slovenia
- Traditional region: Styria
- Statistical region: Drava
- Municipality: Slovenska Bistrica

Area
  - Total: 2.99 km^{2} (1.15 sq mi)
- Elevation: 328.1 m (1,076 ft)

Population (2002)
  - Total: 540

Zgornja Bistrica (pronounced [ˈzɡoːɾnja ˈbiːstɾitsa]; German: Oberfeistritz) is a settlement in northeastern Slovenia. The area is part of the traditional region of Styria. It is now included with the rest of the Municipality of Slovenska Bistrica in the Drava Statistical Region.

== Geography ==
Zgornja Bistrica lies on the northwestern outskirts of Slovenska Bistrica along Bistrica Creek, which flows from the Pohorje Hills.

== History ==
In the late 18th century there was a water-powered forge in Zgornja Bistrica. It processed iron ore from nearby sites and used charcoal produced in the Pohorje Hills as fuel. The industry produced copper sheeting in the 19th century and vessels for distilling spirits. It started producing brass products in the early 20th century.

=== Second World War ===
During the Second World War, the communist opposition organized strikes among the workers at the metal-processing industry in Zgornja Bistrica. On July 7, 1944, members of the Partisans' Bračič Brigade attacked the plant and blew up equipment there.

==== Mass graves ====
Zgornja Bistrica is the site of two known mass graves from the period immediately after the Second World War. Both are located northwest of the settlement, and the entrances have been reinforced with concrete and sealed with a metal door. The Pit A Mass Grave (Slovene: Grobišče v rovu A) is a former mine shaft and bunker next to the Impol factory. The grave contained the remains of 231 adult civilians that were exhumed in 2001. The Pit B Mass Grave (Grobišče v rovu B) is located 50 meters (160 ft) northwest of the first. It contained the remains of 200 adult civilians that were exhumed in 2002.

=== Postwar ===
Zgornja Bistrica was originally part of Slovenska Bistrica, and it became a separate settlement after the Second World War. The metal-processing industry in Zgornja Bistrica was renamed Impol (a syllabic abbreviation from Industrija metalnih polizdelkov 'semi-finished metal products industry') after the Second World War and started processing aluminum in association with the aluminum factory in Kidričevo. The factory became a driver of development in the settlement as an employer, resulting in additional construction of housing, a new school, and shops.
