= Cigonca =

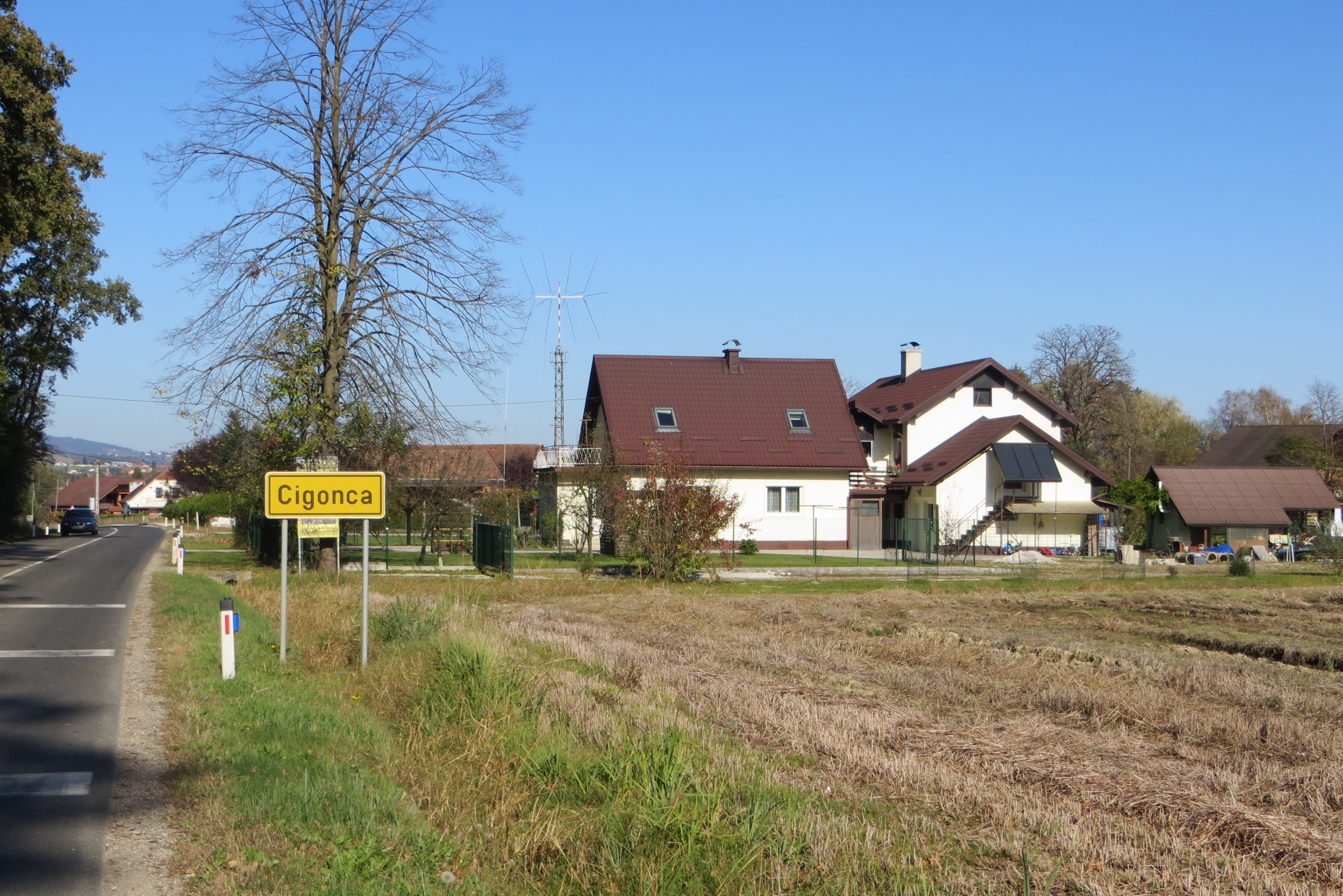

- Location in Slovenia
- Coordinates: 46°22′22.83″N 15°33′28.9″E
- Country: Slovenia
- Traditional region: Styria
- Statistical region: Drava
- Municipality: Slovenska Bistrica

Area
  - Total: 8.45 km^{2} (3.26 sq mi)
- Elevation: 269.1 m (883 ft)

Population (2002)
  - Total: 227

Cigonca (pronounced [ˈtsiːɡɔntsa]) is a village just south of Slovenska Bistrica in northeastern Slovenia. The area is part of the traditional region of Styria. It is now included with the rest of the Municipality of Slovenska Bistrica in the Drava Statistical Region.
