= Kovača Vas, Slovenska Bistrica =

Kovača Vas
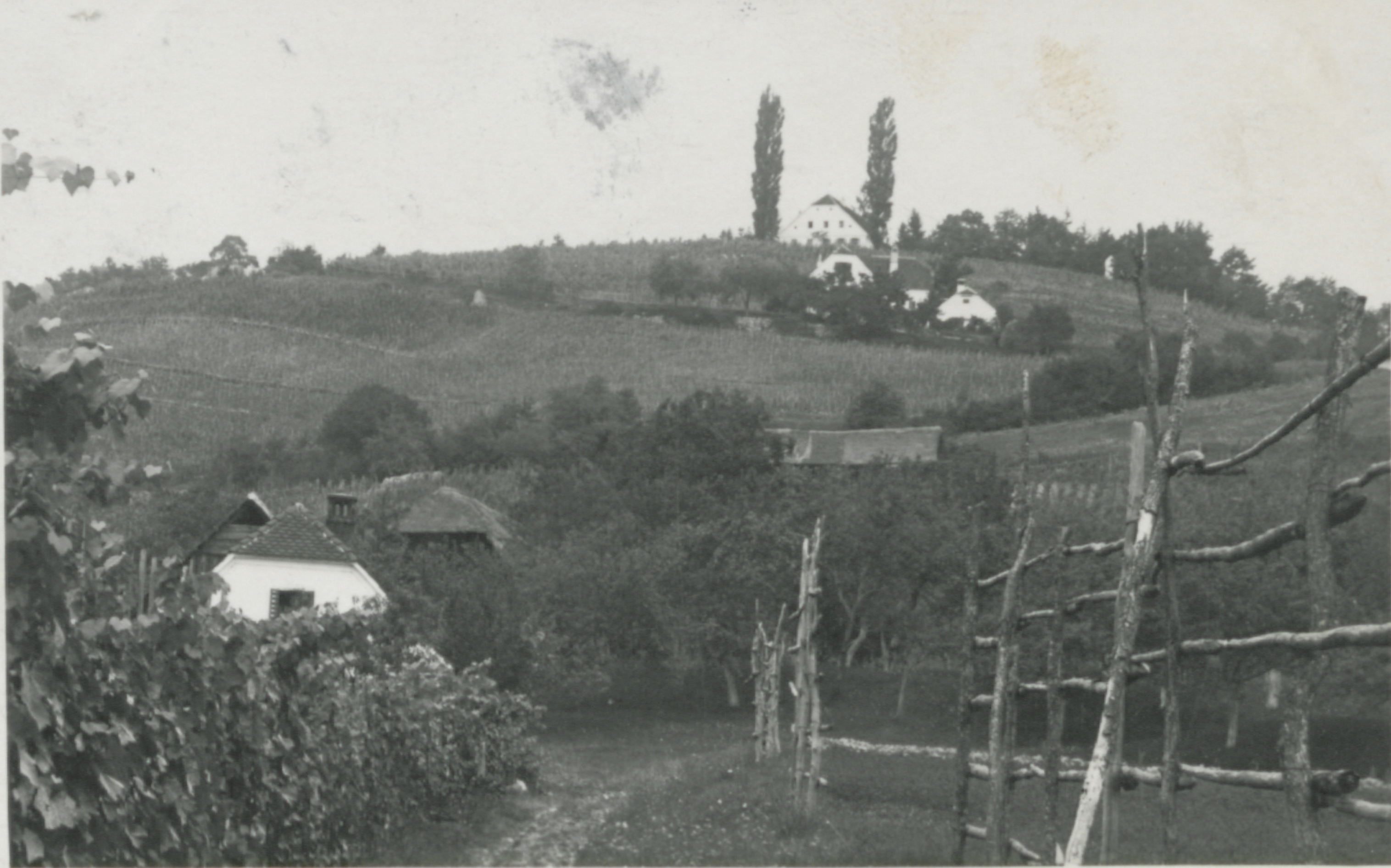
- 1929 postcard of Kovača Vas

- Location in Slovenia
- Coordinates: 46°24′22.04″N 15°33′25.44″E
- Country: Slovenia
- Traditional region: Styria
- Statistical region: Drava
- Municipality: Slovenska Bistrica

Area
  - Total: 3.41 km^{2} (1.32 sq mi)
- Elevation: 361.5 m (1,186 ft)

Population (2002)
  - Total: 486

Kovača Vas (pronounced [kɔˈʋaːtʃa ˈʋaːs]; Slovene: Kovača vas) is a settlement in the hills just north of Slovenska Bistrica in northeastern Slovenia. The area is part of the traditional region of Styria. It is now included with the rest of the Municipality of Slovenska Bistrica in the Drava Statistical Region.

A small church in the settlement is dedicated to Saint Roch and belongs to the Parish of Slovenska Bistrica. It was built in 1922.
