= Laporje, Slovenska Bistrica =

Laporje
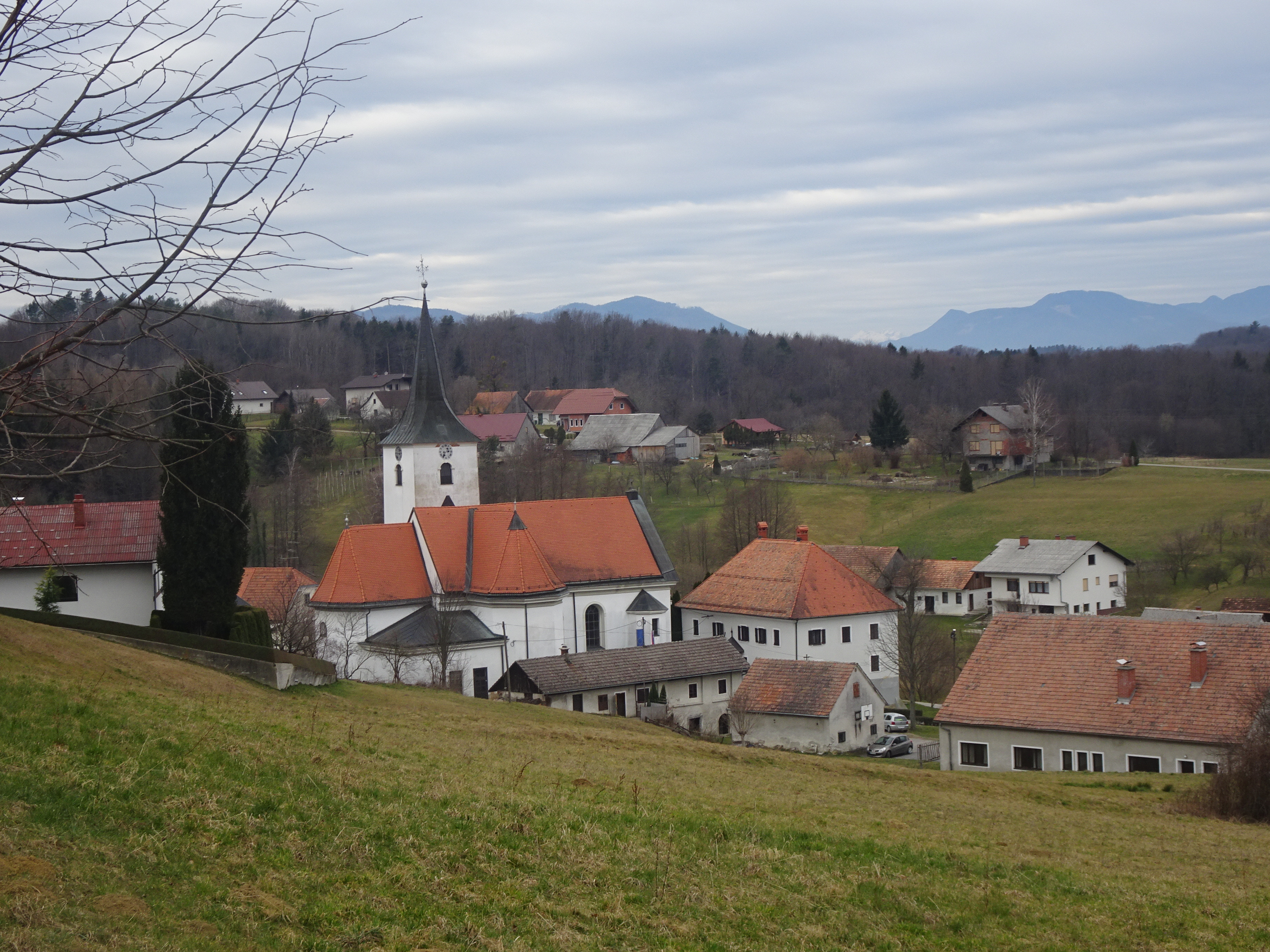

- Location in Slovenia
- Coordinates: 46°20′49.89″N 15°35′34.24″E
- Country: Slovenia
- Traditional region: Styria
- Statistical region: Drava
- Municipality: Slovenska Bistrica

Area
  - Total: 3.59 km^{2} (1.39 sq mi)
- Elevation: 269.2 m (883 ft)

Population (2002)
  - Total: 361

Laporje (pronounced [ˈlaːpɔɾjɛ]) is a village in the Municipality of Slovenska Bistrica in northeastern Slovenia. The area is part of the traditional region of Styria. It is now included with the rest of the municipality in the Drava Statistical Region. The village includes the hamlets of Laporska Gorca to the southeast and Turnše to the southwest.

== Name ==
Laporje was first attested in written sources in 1251 as Lapriach (and as Lapriak in 1273 and Labriach in 1480). The name is derived from the Slovene common noun lapor 'marl', referring to the characteristics of the local soil. The place name is now a singular neuter form but, based on the locative plurals reflected in the medieval attestations, it was probably originally the plural demonym *Lapor′ane (literally, 'people living on marly soil').

== History ==
The area was already settled in antiquity, as testified by the discovery of four carved stones during renovation of the church in 1907. (Two of the stones have been lost, and one is now built into the south wall of the church.) Schooling was established in Laporje in 1828, with classes held in the rectory. School buildings were built in the village in 1848, 1881, and 1926.

== Church ==
The parish church in the settlement is dedicated to Saints Phillip and James and belongs to the Roman Catholic Archdiocese of Maribor. It was built in 1907 on the site of a 14th-century church. The first structure at the site dated to 1374, and the parish was established in 1395. The first known parish priest was attested in 1429, and the parish records date back to 1619. The main altar in the church was created by Jožef Holzinger in 1770, and several statues are the work of Jožef Straub.
