= Črešnjevec, Slovenska Bistrica =

Črešnjevec
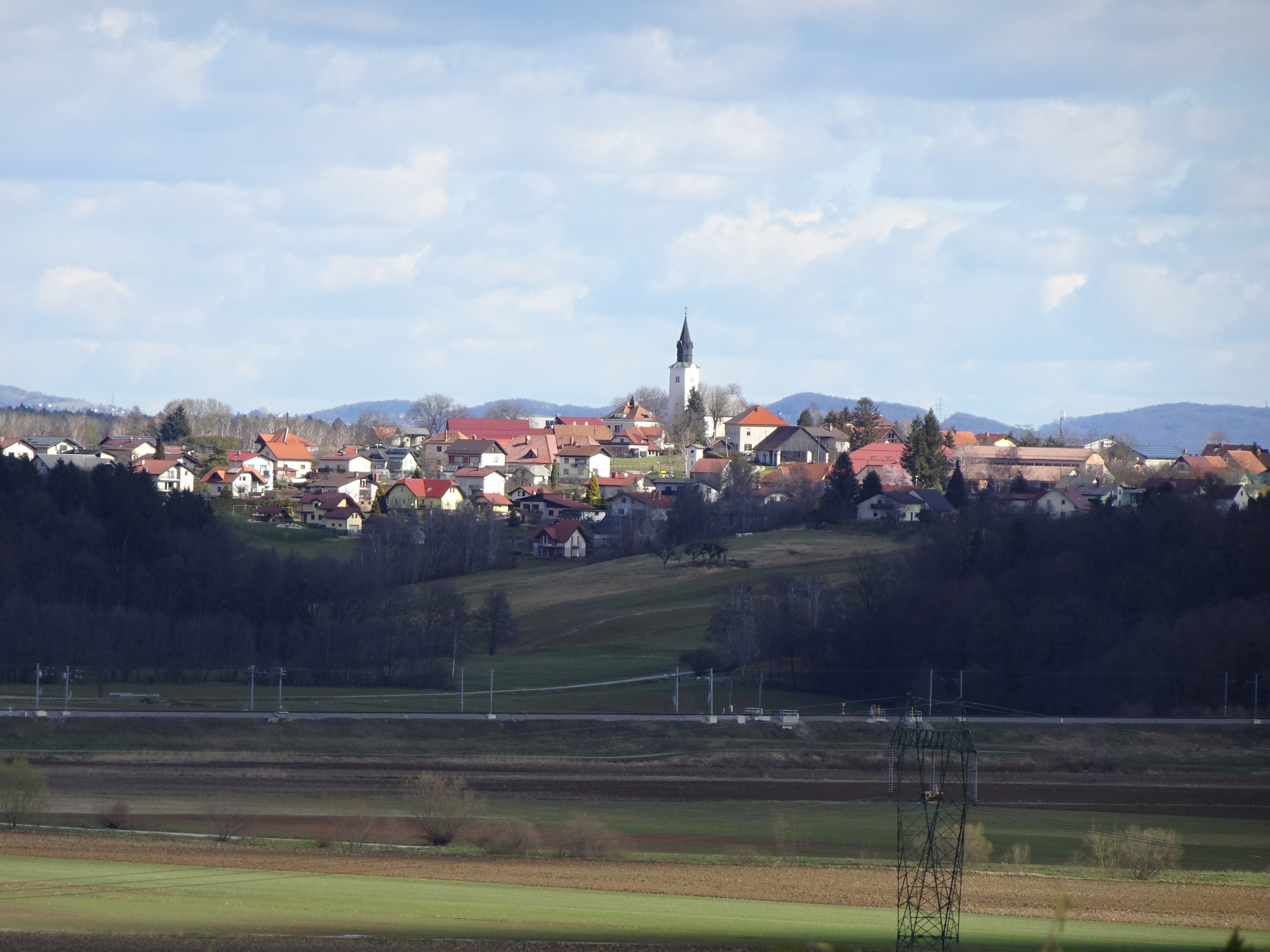

- Location in Slovenia
- Coordinates: 46°22′26.15″N 15°36′48.8″E
- Country: Slovenia
- Traditional region: Styria
- Statistical region: Drava
- Municipality: Slovenska Bistrica

Area
  - Total: 6.01 km^{2} (2.32 sq mi)
- Elevation: 294.9 m (968 ft)

Population (2002)
  - Total: 496

Črešnjevec (pronounced [ˈtʃɾeːʃnjɛʋəts]; German: Kerschbach) is a village in the Municipality of Slovenska Bistrica in northeastern Slovenia. It lies southeast of the town of Slovenska Bistrica itself. The railway line from Ljubljana to Maribor runs through a tunnel near the settlement. The area is part of the traditional region of Styria. It is now included with the rest of the municipality in the Drava Statistical Region.

The local parish church is dedicated to Saint Michael and belongs to the Roman Catholic Archdiocese of Maribor. It was originally a Romanesque building. It was greatly rebuilt in 1374, but some of the original structure survives in the walls of the nave. It was restyled in the Baroque in the 18th century.
