= Spodnja Nova Vas =

- Location in Slovenia
- Coordinates: 46°23′0.97″N 15°35′53.91″E
- Country: Slovenia
- Traditional region: Styria
- Statistical region: Drava
- Municipality: Slovenska Bistrica

Area
  - Total: 3.65 km^{2} (1.41 sq mi)
- Elevation: 297.7 m (977 ft)

Population (2002)
  - Total: 197

Spodnja Nova Vas (pronounced [ˈspoːdnja ˈnɔːʋa ˈʋaːs]; Slovene: Spodnja Nova vas) is a village immediately east of Slovenska Bistrica in northeastern Slovenia. The area is part of the traditional region of Styria. It is now included with the rest of the Municipality of Slovenska Bistrica in the Drava Statistical Region.
