= Stari Log, Slovenska Bistrica =

Stari Log
- Location in Slovenia
- Coordinates: 46°22′56.03″N 15°39′4.81″E
- Country: Slovenia
- Traditional region: Styria
- Statistical region: Drava
- Municipality: Slovenska Bistrica

Area
  - Total: 3.57 km^{2} (1.38 sq mi)
- Elevation: 247 m (810 ft)

Population (2002)
  - Total: 246

Stari Log (pronounced [ˈstaːɾi ˈloːk]) is a settlement south of Pragersko in the Municipality of Slovenska Bistrica in northeastern Slovenia. The main railway line from Ljubljana to Maribor runs through the settlement. The area is part of the traditional region of Styria. It is now included with the rest of the municipality in the Drava Statistical Region.
