= Municipality of Slovenska Bistrica =

Municipality of Slovenia

Municipality of Slovenska Bistrica Občina Slovenska Bistrica
- Municipality
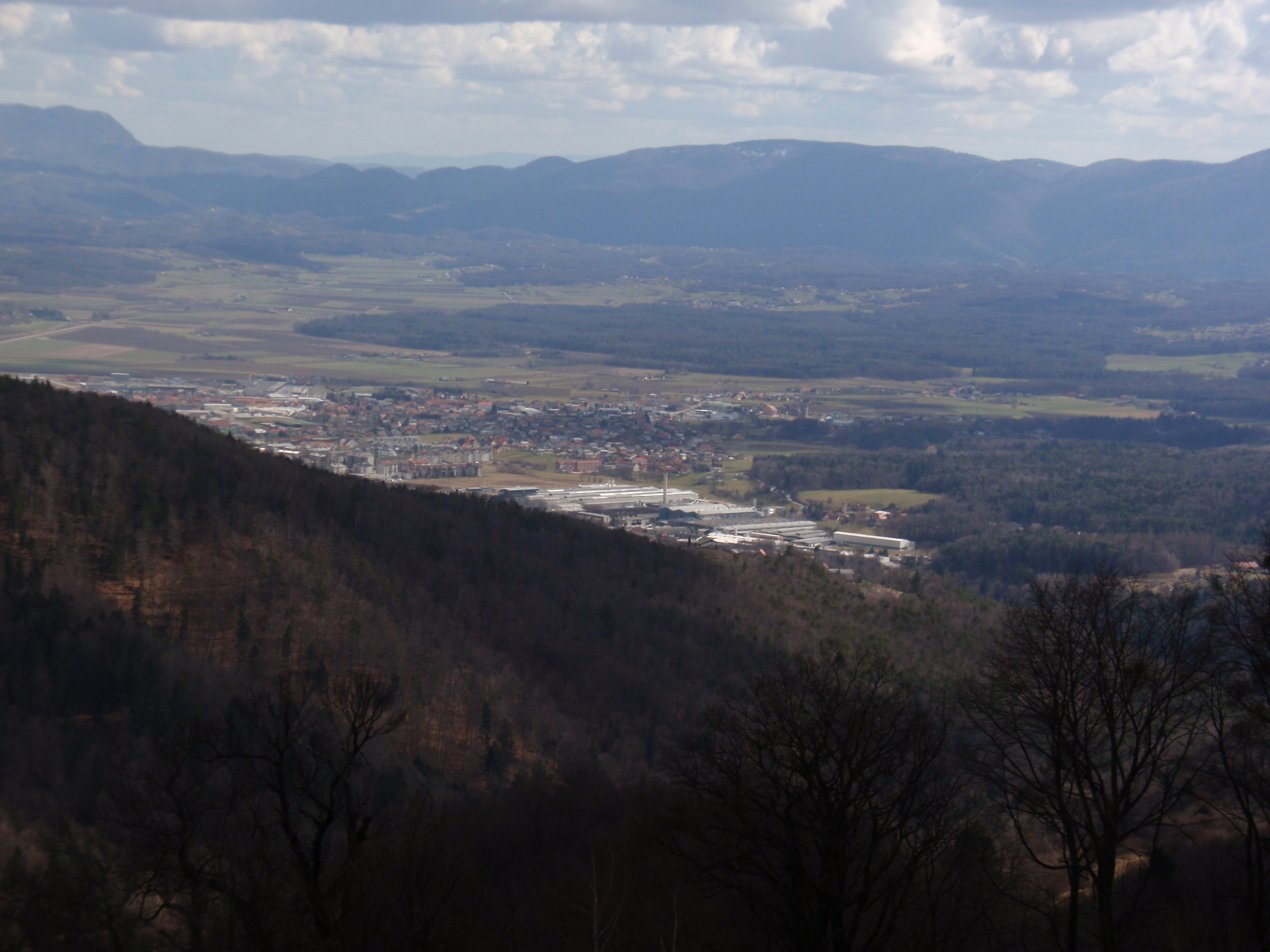

- Location of the Municipality of Slovenska Bistrica in Slovenia
- Coordinates: 46°25′N 15°32′E
- Country: Slovenia

Government
  - Mayor: Ivan Žagar (SLS)

Area
  - Total: 260.1 km^{2} (100.4 sq mi)

Population (July 1, 2018)
  - Total: 25,552
  - Density: 98.24/km^{2} (254.4/sq mi)
- Time zone: UTC+01 (CET)
  - Summer (DST): UTC+02 (CEST)
- Website: www.slovenska-bistrica.si

The Municipality of Slovenska Bistrica (pronounced [slɔˈʋeːnska ˈbiːstɾitsa]; Slovene: Občina Slovenska Bistrica) is a municipality in the traditional region of Styria in northeastern Slovenia. The seat of the municipality is the town of Slovenska Bistrica. Slovenska Bistrica became a municipality in 1994.

Slovenska Bistrica and the neighboring municipalities in the region

== Settlements ==
In addition to the municipal seat of Slovenska Bistrica, the municipality also includes the following settlements:

- Bojtina
- Brezje pri Slovenski Bistrici
- Bukovec
- Cezlak
- Cigonca
- Črešnjevec
- Devina
- Dolgi Vrh
- Drumlažno
- Farovec
- Fošt
- Frajhajm
- Gabernik
- Gaj
- Gladomes
- Hošnica
- Ješovec
- Jurišna Vas
- Kalše
- Kebelj
- Klopce
- Kočno ob Ložnici
- Kočno pri Polskavi
- Korplje
- Kostanjevec
- Kot na Pohorju
- Kovača Vas
- Križni Vrh
- Laporje
- Leskovec
- Levič
- Lokanja Vas
- Lukanja
- Malo Tinje
- Modrič
- Nadgrad
- Nova Gora nad Slovensko Bistrico
- Ogljenšak
- Ošelj
- Planina pod Šumikom
- Podgrad na Pohorju
- Pokoše
- Pragersko
- Preloge
- Prepuž
- Pretrež
- Radkovec
- Razgor pri Žabljeku
- Rep
- Ritoznoj
- Sele pri Polskavi
- Šentovec
- Sevec
- Šmartno na Pohorju
- Smrečno
- Spodnja Ložnica
- Spodnja Nova Vas
- Spodnja Polskava
- Spodnje Prebukovje
- Stari Log
- Tinjska Gora
- Trnovec pri Slovenski Bistrici
- Turiška Vas na Pohorju
- Urh
- Veliko Tinje
- Videž
- Vinarje
- Visole
- Vrhloga
- Vrhole pri Laporju
- Vrhole pri Slovenskih Konjicah
- Žabljek
- Zgornja Bistrica
- Zgornja Brežnica
- Zgornja Ložnica
- Zgornja Nova Vas
- Zgornja Polskava
- Zgornje Prebukovje
