= Malo Tinje =

- Location in Slovenia
- Coordinates: 46°24′50.66″N 15°29′30.65″E
- Country: Slovenia
- Traditional region: Styria
- Statistical region: Drava
- Municipality: Slovenska Bistrica

Area
  - Total: 0.94 km^{2} (0.36 sq mi)
- Elevation: 657.8 m (2,158 ft)

Population (2002)
  - Total: 72

Malo Tinje (pronounced [ˈmaːlɔ ˈtiːnjɛ]) is a small village in the Pohorje Hills in the Municipality of Slovenska Bistrica in northeastern Slovenia. The area is part of the traditional region of Styria. It is now included with the rest of the municipality in the Drava Statistical Region.

A small chapel in the settlement was built in 1931.
