= Ritoznoj =

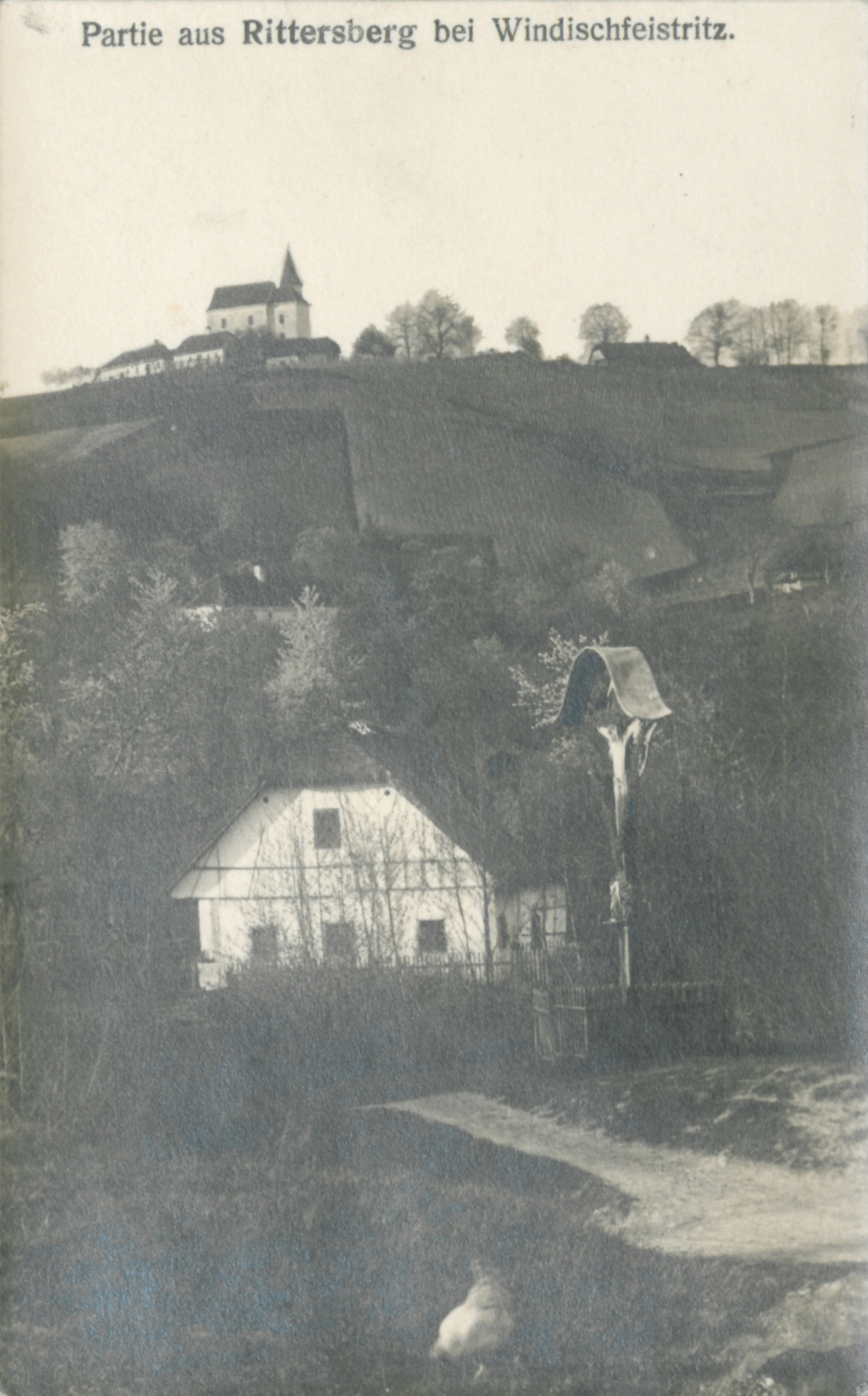
- 1913 postcard of Ritoznoj

- Location in Slovenia
- Coordinates: 46°25′1″N 15°35′15″E
- Country: Slovenia
- Traditional region: Styria
- Statistical region: Drava
- Municipality: Slovenska Bistrica

Area
  - Total: 2.11 km^{2} (0.81 sq mi)
- Elevation: 357.6 m (1,173 ft)

Population (2002)
  - Total: 210

Ritoznoj (pronounced [ˈɾiːtɔznɔi̯]; in older sources also Ritosnoj, German: Rittersberg) is a settlement in the foothills of the Pohorje range, just north of Slovenska Bistrica in northeastern Slovenia. The area is part of the traditional region of Styria. It is now included with the rest of the municipality in the Drava Statistical Region. It is best known for the local white wine known as Ritoznojčan, based on the Welschriesling grape variety.

== Name ==
The settlement was attested in written sources around 1500 as Rytesney perg and am Ritesney. The name is derived from *rito-znojь, meaning 'place where the sun warms the back side (of the mountain)', which is a compound of Slavic *ritь 'back side' and *znojiti 'to warm, heat'. In the past the German name was Rittersberg.

== Church ==
The local church is dedicated to Saint Margaret (Slovene: sveta Marjeta) and belongs to the Parish of Slovenska Bistrica. It dates to the 17th century.
