= Veliko Tinje =

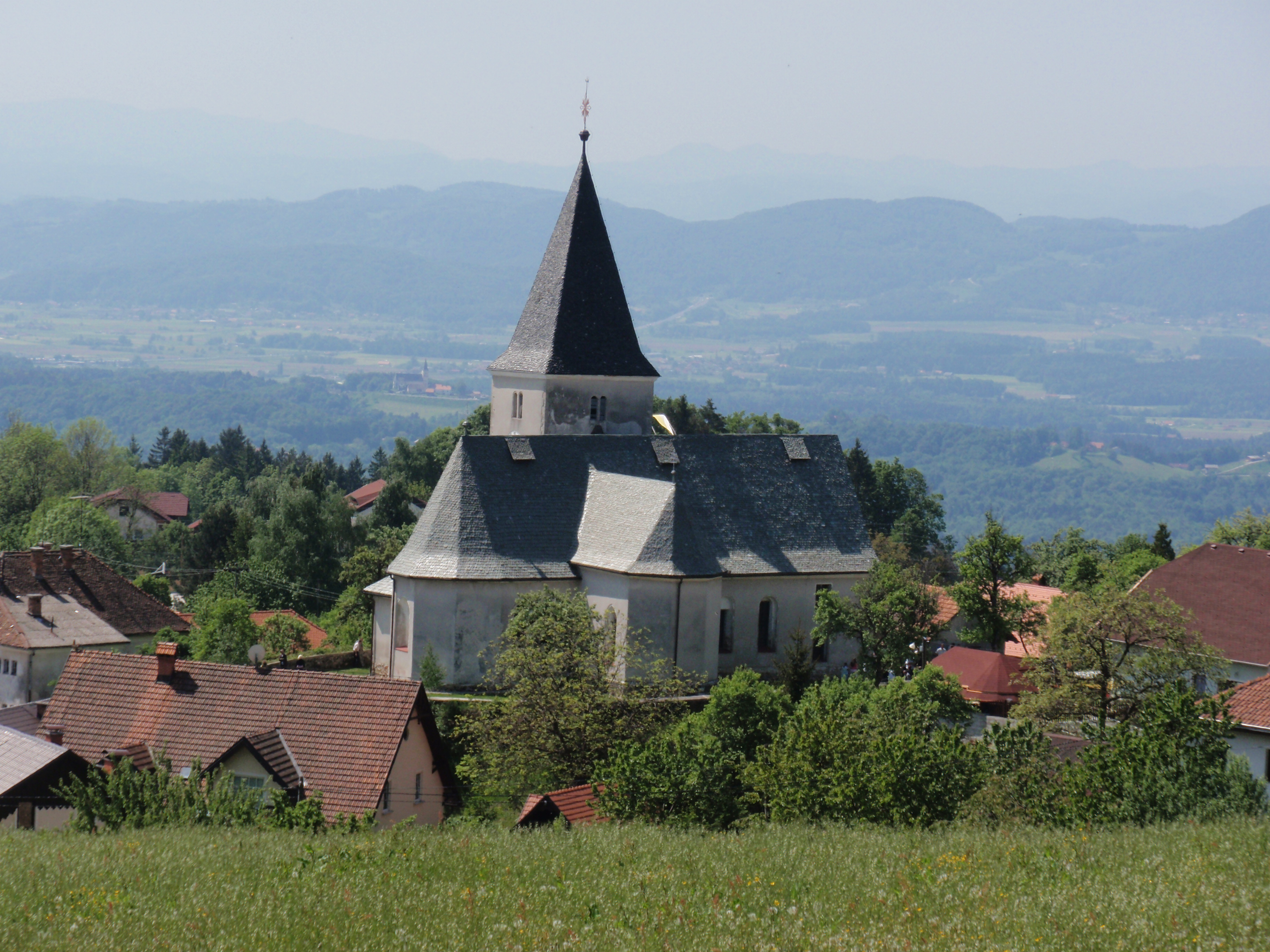

- Location in Slovenia
- Coordinates: 46°24′55.35″N 15°30′7.22″E
- Country: Slovenia
- Traditional region: Styria
- Statistical region: Drava
- Municipality: Slovenska Bistrica

Area
  - Total: 1.46 km^{2} (0.56 sq mi)
- Elevation: 654.7 m (2,148 ft)

Population (2002)
  - Total: 149

Veliko Tinje (pronounced [ˈʋeːlikɔ ˈtiːnjɛ]) is a village in the Pohorje Hills in the Municipality of Slovenska Bistrica in northeastern Slovenia. The area is part of the traditional region of Styria. It is now included with the rest of the municipality in the Drava Statistical Region.

The local parish church is dedicated to Saints Peter and Paul and belongs to the Roman Catholic Archdiocese of Maribor. It is originally a Romanesque building with later adaptations.
