= Zgornja Polskava =

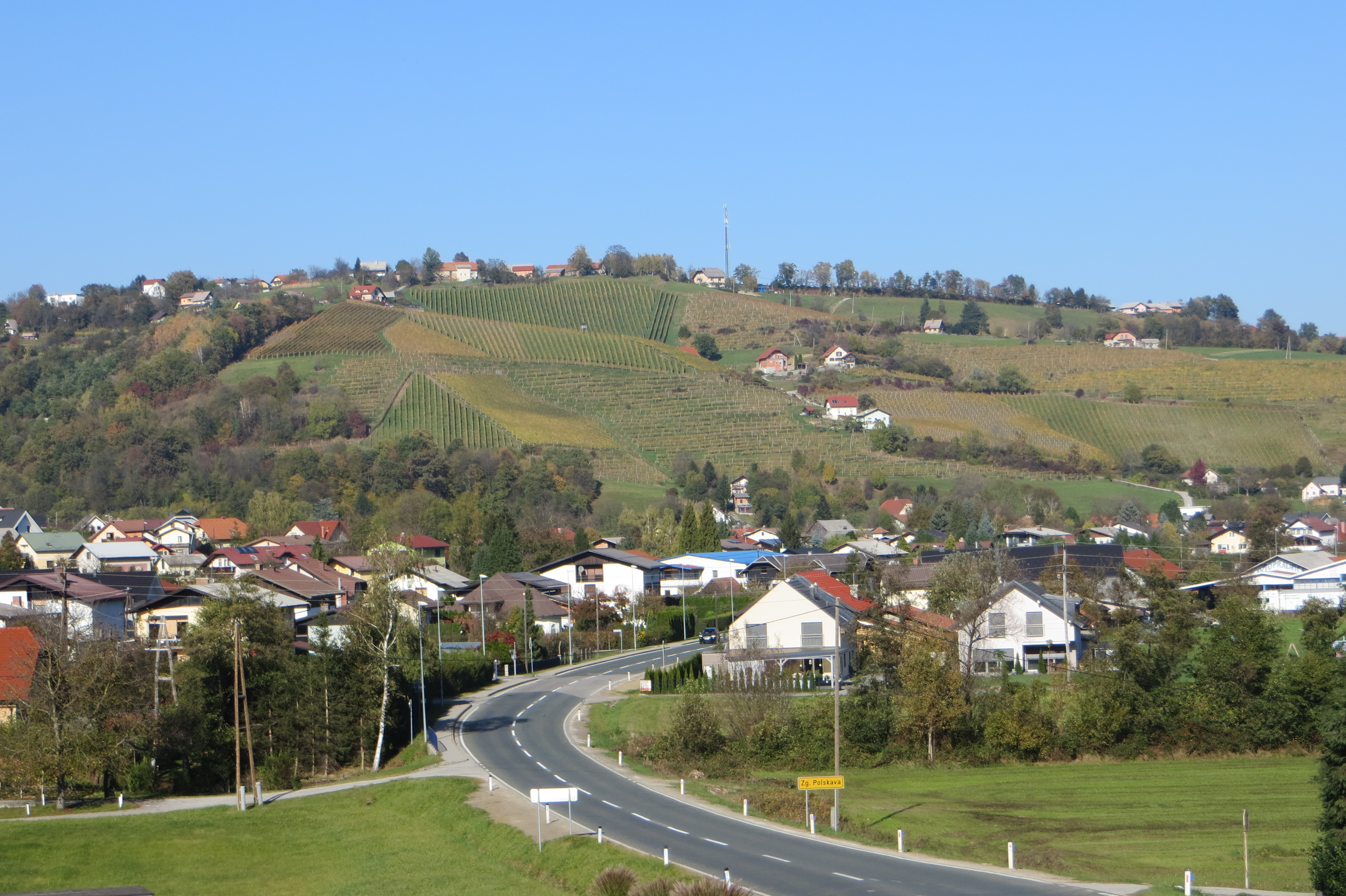

- Location in Slovenia
- Coordinates: 46°25′33.03″N 15°36′25.09″E
- Country: Slovenia
- Traditional region: Styria
- Statistical region: Drava
- Municipality: Slovenska Bistrica

Area
  - Total: 2.78 km^{2} (1.07 sq mi)
- Elevation: 296.4 m (972 ft)

Population (2002)
  - Total: 1,126

Zgornja Polskava (pronounced [ˈzɡoːɾnja pɔlˈskaːʋa]) is a settlement in the Municipality of Slovenska Bistrica in northeastern Slovenia. It lies on the old main road to Maribor north of Slovenska Bistrica. The area is part of the traditional region of Styria. It is now included with the rest of the municipality in the Drava Statistical Region.

The local parish church is dedicated to the Holy Trinity and belongs to the Roman Catholic Archdiocese of Maribor. It was built in 1619 and extended in the 18th century.
