= Ložnica (Savinja) =

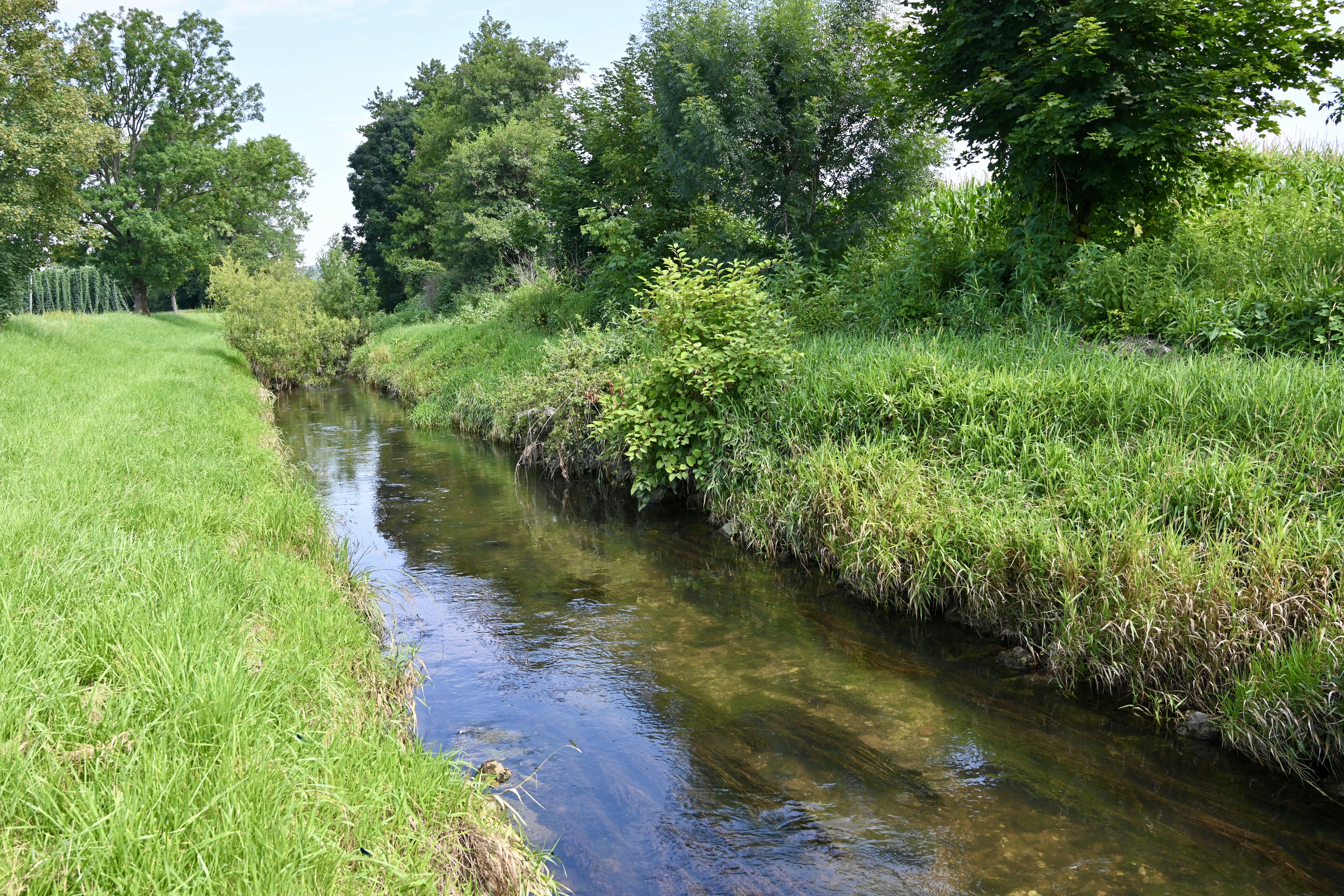

Location
- Country: Slovenia

Physical characteristics
- Mouth
  - location: Savinja
  - coordinates: 46.2338°N 15.2466°E
- Length: 26 km (16 mi)
- Basin size: 141 km^{2} (54 sq mi)

Basin features
- Progression: Savinja→ Sava→ Danube→ Black Sea

The Ložnica (pronounced [lɔˈʒniːtsa]) is a river in Slovenia, a left tributary of the Savinja in Celje. It is 26 kilometres (16 mi) long.
