= List of cities, towns, and villages in Slovenia: K =

This is a list of cities, towns, and villages in Slovenia, starting with K.

Settlement	Municipality
Kačiče-Pared	Divača
Kačji Dol	Rogaška Slatina
Kačji Potok	Kočevje
Kadrenci	Cerkvenjak
Kajžar	Ormož
Kal nad Kanalom	Kanal
Kal pri Dolah	Litija
Kal pri Krmelju	Sevnica
Kal	Hrastnik
Kal	Ivančna Gorica
Kal	Pivka
Kal	Semič
Kal	Tolmin
Kalce	Krško
Kalce	Logatec
Kalce-Naklo	Krško
Kale	Žalec
Kališe	Kamnik
Kališe	Železniki
Kališovec	Krško
Kal-Koritnica	Bovec
Kalobje	Šentjur
Kalše	Slovenska Bistrica
Kambreško	Kanal
Kamence	Brežice
Kamence	Rogaška Slatina
Kamenče	Braslovče
Kamenica	Metlika
Kamenica	Sevnica
Kamenik	Šmarje pri Jelšah
Kameno	Šentjur
Kamna Gora	Slovenske Konjice
Kamna Gorca	Rogaška Slatina
Kamna Gorica	Radovljica
Kamni Potok	Trebnje
Kamni Vrh pri Ambrusu	Ivančna Gorica
Kamni Vrh pri Primskovem	Litija
Kamni Vrh	Litija
Kamnica	Dol pri Ljubljani
Kamnica	Maribor
Kamnik pod Krimom	Brezovica
Kamnik	Kamnik
Kamniška Bistrica	Kamnik
Kamnje	Ajdovščina
Kamnje	Bohinj
Kamnje	Trebnje
Kamno Brdo	Ivančna Gorica
Kamno	Tolmin
Kamovci	Lendava
Kampel	Koper
Kanal	Kanal
Kanalski Lom	Tolmin
Kanalski Vrh	Kanal
Kančevci	Moravske Toplice
Kandrše - del	Litija
Kandrše - del	Zagorje ob Savi
Kaniža	Šentilj
Kanižarica	Črnomelj
Kanji Dol	Idrija
Kanjuce	Štore
Kapca	Lendava
Kapele	Brežice
Kapelski Vrh	Radenci
Kapla	Tabor (občina)
Kaplanovo	Velike Lašče
Kaplja vas	Prebold
Kaplja vas	Sevnica
Kapljišče	Metlika
Kaptol	Kostel
Karlče	Krško
Karli	Koper
Karlovica	Velike Lašče
Kasaze	Žalec
Kastelec	Koper
Kašča	Semič
Katarija	Moravče
Kavče	Velenje
Kazlje	Sežana
Kebelj	Slovenska Bistrica
Kicar	Ptuj
Kidričevo	Kidričevo
Kilovče	Ilirska Bistrica
Kisovec	Zagorje ob Savi
Kitni Vrh	Ivančna Gorica
Klada	Škofljica
Kladje nad Blanco	Sevnica
Kladje pri Krmelju	Sevnica
Kladje	Gorenja vas-Poljane
Kladje	Laško
Kladnart	Vojnik
Klake	Kozje
Klanc	Dobrna
Klance	Loška Dolina
Klanec pri Gabrovki	Litija
Klanec pri Komnu	Komen
Klanec pri Kozini	Hrpelje-Kozina
Klanec	Komenda
Klavže	Tolmin
Kleč	Kočevje
Kleče pri Dolu	Dol pri Ljubljani
Klečet	Žužemberk
Klemenčevo	Kamnik
Klenik	Litija
Klenik	Pivka
Klenovik	Škocjan
Klenovo	Laško
Klinja vas	Kočevje
Ključarovci pri Ljutomeru	Križevci
Ključevica	Trbovlje
Klokočovnik	Slovenske Konjice
Klopce	Dol pri Ljubljani
Klopce	Slovenska Bistrica
Klopce	Žužemberk
Klošter	Metlika
Knape	Škofja Loka
Knej	Velike Lašče
Kneške Ravne	Tolmin
Knezdol	Trbovlje
Kneža	Tolmin
Knežak	Ilirska Bistrica
Knežina	Črnomelj
Knežja Lipa	Kočevje
Knežja Njiva	Loška Dolina
Knežja vas	Trebnje
Kobarid	Kobarid
Kobdilj	Komen
Kobile	Krško
Kobilje	Kobilje
Kobilščak	Radenci
Kobjeglava	Komen
Koblarji	Kočevje
Koble	Slovenske Konjice
Koblek	Vojnik
Koboli	Komen
Kocjan	Radenci
Kočarija	Krško
Kočarji	Kočevje
Koče	Kočevje
Koče	Postojna
Kočevje	Kočevje
Kočevska Reka	Kočevje
Kočevske Poljane	Dolenjske Toplice
Kočice	Žetale
Kočki Vrh	Sveti Jurij ob Ščavnici
Kočna	Jesenice
Kočno ob Ložnici	Slovenska Bistrica
Kočno pri Polskavi	Slovenska Bistrica
Kočno	Krško
Kodreti	Komen
Kog	Ormož
Koglo	Novo mesto
Kojsko	Brda
Kokarje	Nazarje
Kokolajnščak	Sveti Jurij ob Ščavnici
Kokoriči	Križevci
Kokošnje	Domžale
Kokra	Preddvor
Kokrica	Kranj
Kolačno	Slovenske Konjice
Kolenča vas	Dobrepolje
Količevo	Domžale
Kolk	Zagorje ob Savi
Kolomban	Koper
Kolovec	Domžale
Kolovrat	Zagorje ob Savi
Koludrje	Sevnica
Komanija	Dobrova-Polhov Gradec
Komarna vas	Semič
Komarnica	Cerkvenjak
Komen	Komen
Komenda	Komenda
Komendska Dobrava	Komenda
Komolec	Kočevje
Kompole	Štore
Kompolje	Dobrepolje
Kompolje	Lukovica
Kompolje	Sevnica
Konc	Laško
Konca vas	Kočevje
Konec	Novo mesto
Konj	Litija
Konjiška vas	Slovenske Konjice
Konjski Vrh	Luče
Konjsko	Sevnica
Konjsko	Vojnik
Konjšica - del	Litija
Konjšica - del	Zagorje ob Savi
Konuško	Šmarje pri Jelšah
Kopačnica	Gorenja vas-Poljane
Koper	Koper
Kopivnik	Rače-Fram
Kopriva	Razkrižje
Kopriva	Sežana
Koprivna	Črna na Koroškem
Koprivnica	Krško
Koprivnik v Bohinju	Bohinj
Koprivnik	Kočevje
Koprivnik	Krško
Koprivnik	Žiri
Koračice	Ormož
Korenitka	Trebnje
Korenjak	Zavrč
Koreno nad Horjulom	Horjul
Koreno	Lukovica
Koretno	Šmarje pri Jelšah
Korita na Krasu	Miren-Kostanjevica
Korita	Idrija
Korita	Trebnje
Koritnica	Krško
Koritnica	Tolmin
Koritnice	Ilirska Bistrica
Koritno	Bled
Koritno	Brežice
Koritno	Majšperk
Koritno	Oplotnica
Koromači-Boškini	Koper
Korošče	Cerknica
Koroška Bela	Jesenice
Koroška vas na Pohorju	Zreče
Koroška vas	Novo mesto
Koroški Selovec	Ravne na Koroškem
Korovci	Cankova
Korpe	Lukovica
Korplje	Slovenska Bistrica
Korpule	Šmarje pri Jelšah
Korte	Izola
Kortine	Koper
Koseč	Kobarid
Koseze	Ilirska Bistrica
Koseze	Vodice
Kosovelje	Sežana
Kostanj	Kamnik
Kostanjek	Krško
Kostanjevec	Slovenska Bistrica
Kostanjevica na Krasu	Miren-Kostanjevica
Kostanjevica na Krki	Krško
Kostanjevica	Trebnje
Kostel	Kostel
Kostrevnica	Zagorje ob Savi
Kostrivnica	Šentjur
Košaki	Maribor
Košarovci	Gornji Petrovci
Koščake	Cerknica
Košiše	Kamnik
Koške Poljane	Litija
Košnica pri Celju	Celje
Košnica	Šentjur
Koštabona	Koper
Kot na Pohorju	Slovenska Bistrica
Kot ob Kolpi	Črnomelj
Kot pri Prevaljah	Prevalje
Kot pri Rakitnici	Ribnica
Kot pri Ribnici	Ribnica
Kot pri Semiču	Semič
Kot pri Veliki Slevici	Velike Lašče
Kot	Ig
Kot	Lendava
Kotel	Sodražica
Koti	Novo mesto
Kotlje	Ravne na Koroškem
Kotredež	Zagorje ob Savi
Kovača vas	Črnomelj
Kovača vas	Slovenska Bistrica
Kovačevci	Grad
Kovačji Grad	Črnomelj
Kovaški Vrh	Oplotnica
Kovčice	Hrpelje-Kozina
Kovk	Ajdovščina
Kovk	Hrastnik
Kovor	Tržič
Kovski Vrh	Škofja Loka
Kozana	Brda
Kozarišče	Loška Dolina
Kozarno	Brda
Kozaršče	Tolmin
Kozina	Hrpelje-Kozina
Kozjak nad Pesnico	Kungota
Kozjak pri Ceršaku	Šentilj
Kozjak	Mislinja
Kozjane	Divača
Kozje	Kozje
Kozji Vrh nad Dravogradom	Dravograd
Kozji Vrh	Podvelka
Kozloviči	Koper
Kozmerice	Tolmin
Kozminci	Podlehnik
Kožbana	Brda
Kožljek	Cerknica
Kožljevec	Grosuplje
Kožmani	Ajdovščina
Kraberk	Slovenske Konjice
Kračali	Sodražica
Krajna Brda	Sevnica
Krajna vas	Sežana
Krajna	Tišina (občina)
Krajnčica	Šentjur
Krajno Brdo	Lukovica
Kraljevci	Sveti Jurij ob Ščavnici
Kralji	Kočevje
Kramarovci	Rogašovci
Kramplje	Bloke
Kranj	Kranj
Kranjče	Cerknica
Kranjska Gora	Kranjska Gora
Krapje	Ljutomer
Krasinec	Metlika
Krasna	Slovenska Bistrica
Krasno	Brda
Krašce	Moravče
Krašči	Cankova
Kraška vas	Brežice
Krašnja	Lukovica
Krašnji Vrh	Metlika
Krčevina pri Ptuju	Ptuj
Krčevina pri Vurbergu	Ptuj
Krčevina	Ormož
Kred	Kobarid
Kregarjevo	Kamnik
Kregolišče	Sežana
Kremberk	Sveta Ana (občina)
Kremen	Krško
Kremenca	Cerknica
Kremenica	Ig
Kremenik	Gorenja vas-Poljane
Kreplje	Sežana
Kresnica	Šentilj
Kresnice	Litija
Kresniške Poljane	Litija
Kresniški Vrh	Litija
Kristan Vrh	Šmarje pri Jelšah
Kriška Reber	Trebnje
Kriška vas	Ivančna Gorica
Krištanci	Ljutomer
Krištandol	Hrastnik
Krivčevo	Kamnik
Krivi Vrh	Sveta Ana (občina)
Krivica	Šentjur
Krivo Brdo	Gorenja vas-Poljane
Krivoglavice	Metlika
Križ	Komenda
Križ	Sevnica
Križ	Sežana
Križ	Trebnje
Križan Vrh	Bistrica ob Sotli
Križate	Moravče
Križe	Brežice
Križe	Novo mesto
Križe	Tržič
Križeča vas	Slovenska Bistrica
Križevci pri Ljutomeru	Križevci
Križevci	Gornji Petrovci
Križevec	Zreče
Križevska vas	Dol pri Ljubljani
Križevska vas	Metlika
Križmani	Osilnica
Križna Gora	Ajdovščina
Križna Gora	Škofja Loka
Križni Vrh	Slovenska Bistrica
Križni Vrh	Trebnje
Krka	Ivančna Gorica
Krkavče	Koper
Krkovo nad Faro	Kostel
Krkovo pri Karlovici	Velike Lašče
Krmačina	Metlika
Krmelj	Sevnica
Krn	Kobarid
Krnci	Moravske Toplice
Krnče	Ribnica
Krnica	Bled
Krnica	Koper
Krnica	Luče
Krnice pri Novakih	Gorenja vas-Poljane
Krnice	Hrastnik
Krog	Murska Sobota
Kromberk	Nova Gorica
Kropa	Radovljica
Krplivnik	Hodoš
Krsinji Vrh	Sevnica
Kršič	Kamnik
Krška vas	Brežice
Krška vas	Ivančna Gorica
Krško	Krško
Krtina	Domžale
Krtina	Trebnje
Krtince	Šmarje pri Jelšah
Krtinovica	Sežana
Krupa	Semič
Kruplivnik	Grad
Krušče	Cerknica
Krušni Vrh	Trebnje
Krvava Peč	Velike Lašče
Krvavčji Vrh	Semič
Krvavi Potok	Hrpelje-Kozina
Kržeti	Sodražica
Kržišče pri Čatežu	Litija
Kržišče	Cerknica
Kržišče	Krško
Kubed	Koper
Kuhlarji	Kočevje
Kuk	Tolmin
Kukava	Juršinci
Kukeč	Gornji Petrovci
Kukenberk	Trebnje
Kukmaka	Velike Lašče
Kumen	Lovrenc na Pohorju
Kumpolje	Litija
Kungota pri Ptuju	Kidričevo
Kunova	Gornja Radgona
Kunšperk	Bistrica ob Sotli
Kupčinji Vrh	Majšperk
Kupetinci	Sveti Jurij ob Ščavnici
Kupljenik	Bled
Kupšinci	Murska Sobota
Kuretno	Laško
Kuršinci	Ljutomer
Kušernik	Pesnica
Kuštanovci	Puconci
Kuteževo	Ilirska Bistrica
Kutinci	Sveti Jurij ob Ščavnici
Kuzarjev Kal	Novo mesto
Kuzma	Kuzma
Kuželič	Kostel
Kuželj	Kostel
Kuželjevec	Ivančna Gorica
Kvasica	Črnomelj
