= Krtina =

Krtina may refer to:

- Krtina, Domžale, a village in Upper Carniola, Slovenia
- Krtina, Trebnje, a settlement in eastern Slovenia
