= Kališe, Kamnik =

Kališe
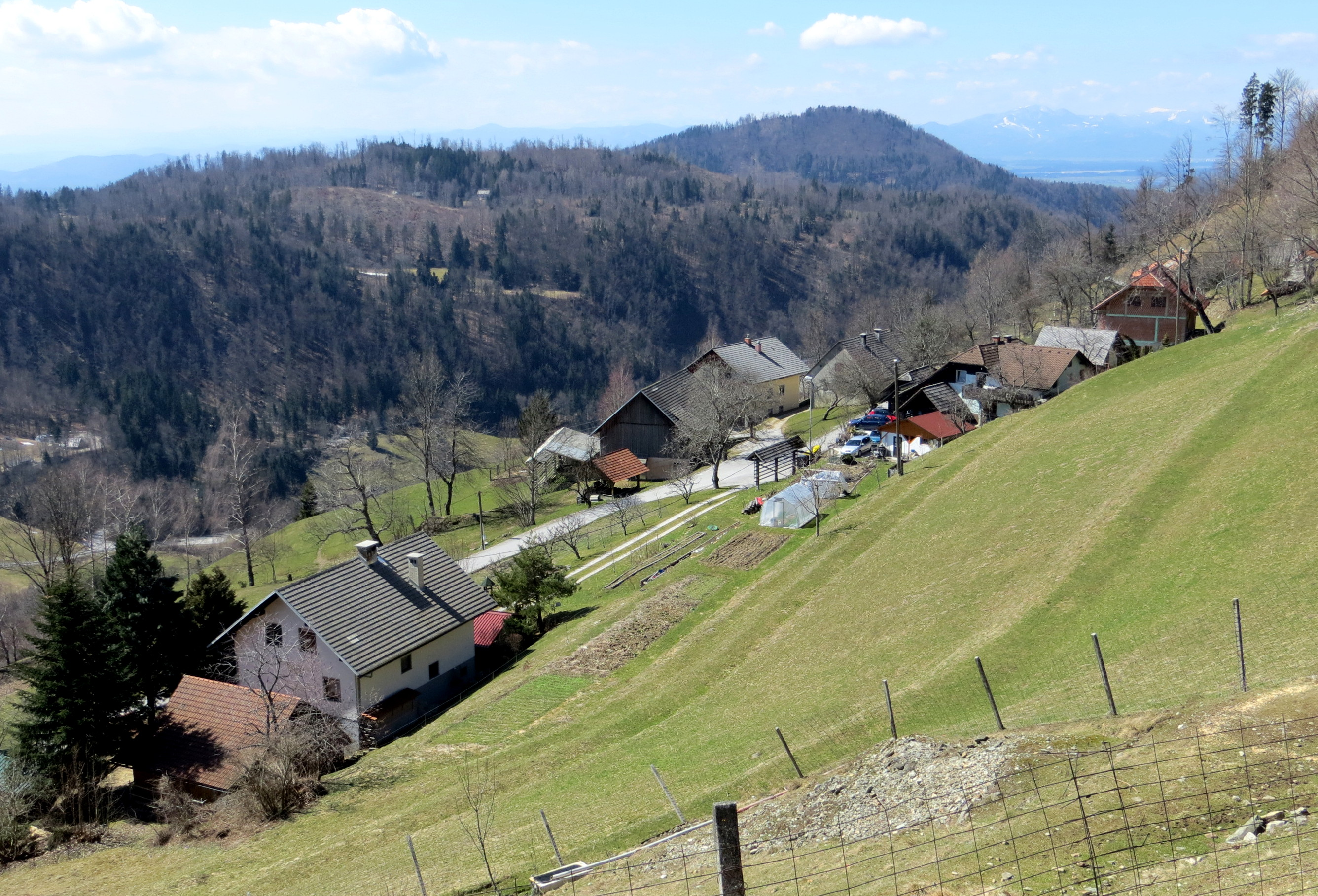

- Location in Slovenia
- Coordinates: 46°15′53.33″N 14°41′5.15″E
- Country: Slovenia
- Traditional region: Upper Carniola
- Statistical region: Central Slovenia
- Municipality: Kamnik
- Elevation: 924.4 m (3,033 ft)

Population (2002)
  - Total: 52

Kališe (pronounced [kaˈliːʃɛ]; in older sources also Kališče, German: Unterkalische, Oberkalische) is a small dispersed settlement in the Municipality of Kamnik in the Upper Carniola region of Slovenia.

== Name ==
The name Kališe is derived from the Slovene common noun kal '(small) pond' and refers to a place with such a feature. Other Slovene toponyms with the same root include Kal, Kalce, Kališče, Kališnik, and Kalše.

== Church ==
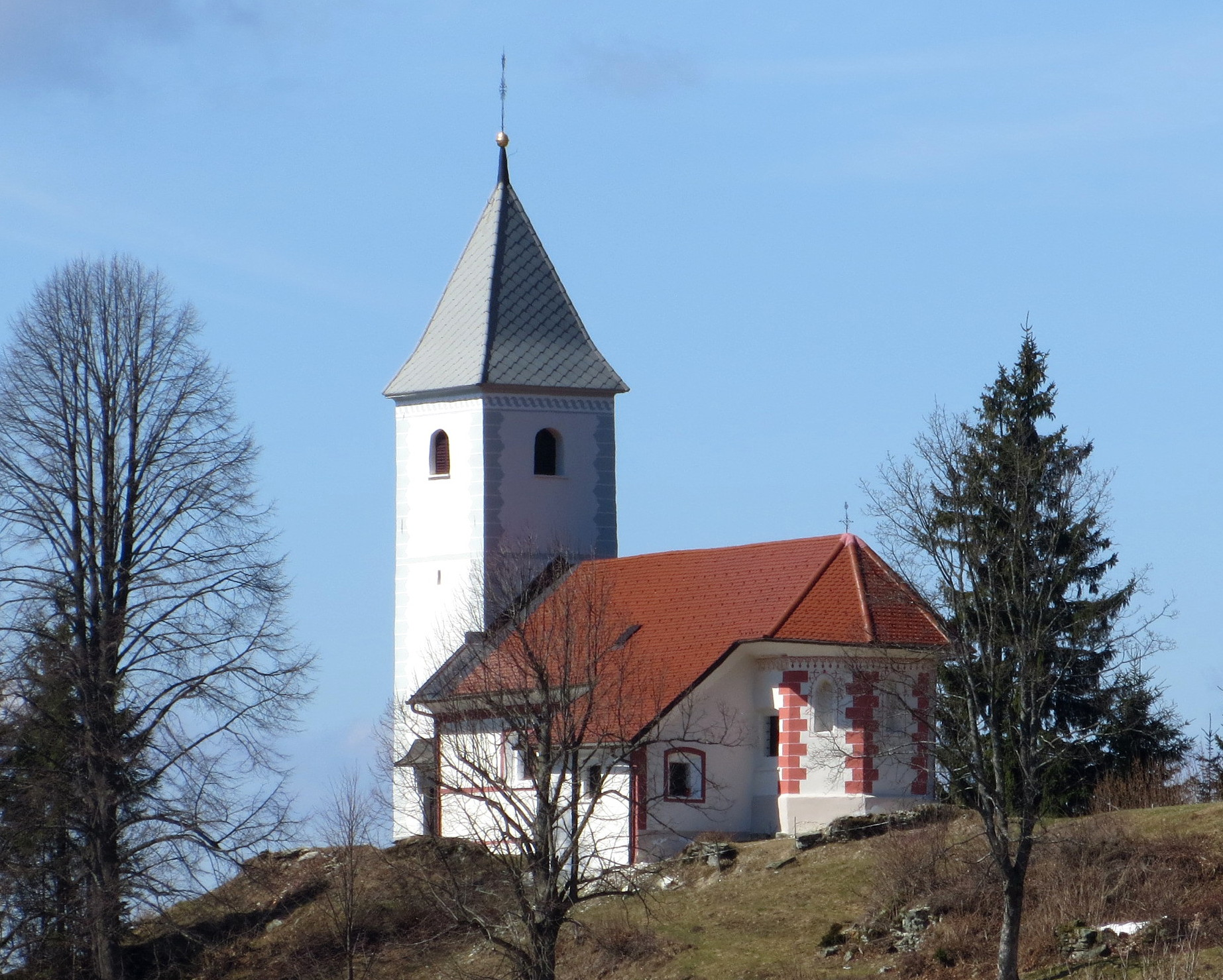
Saint Acacius's Church

The local church, built on a small hill above the village, is dedicated to Saint Acacius of Ararat and is home to an important colony of the lesser horseshoe bat. The church is a chapel of ease belonging to the Parish of Gozd. The church is Gothic, dating to the second half of the 15th century, but parts of it were rebuilt on a number of occasions. The current building dates from 1753, and it features paintings dating from 1772 by Janez Potočnik.
