= Kališe, Železniki =

Kališe
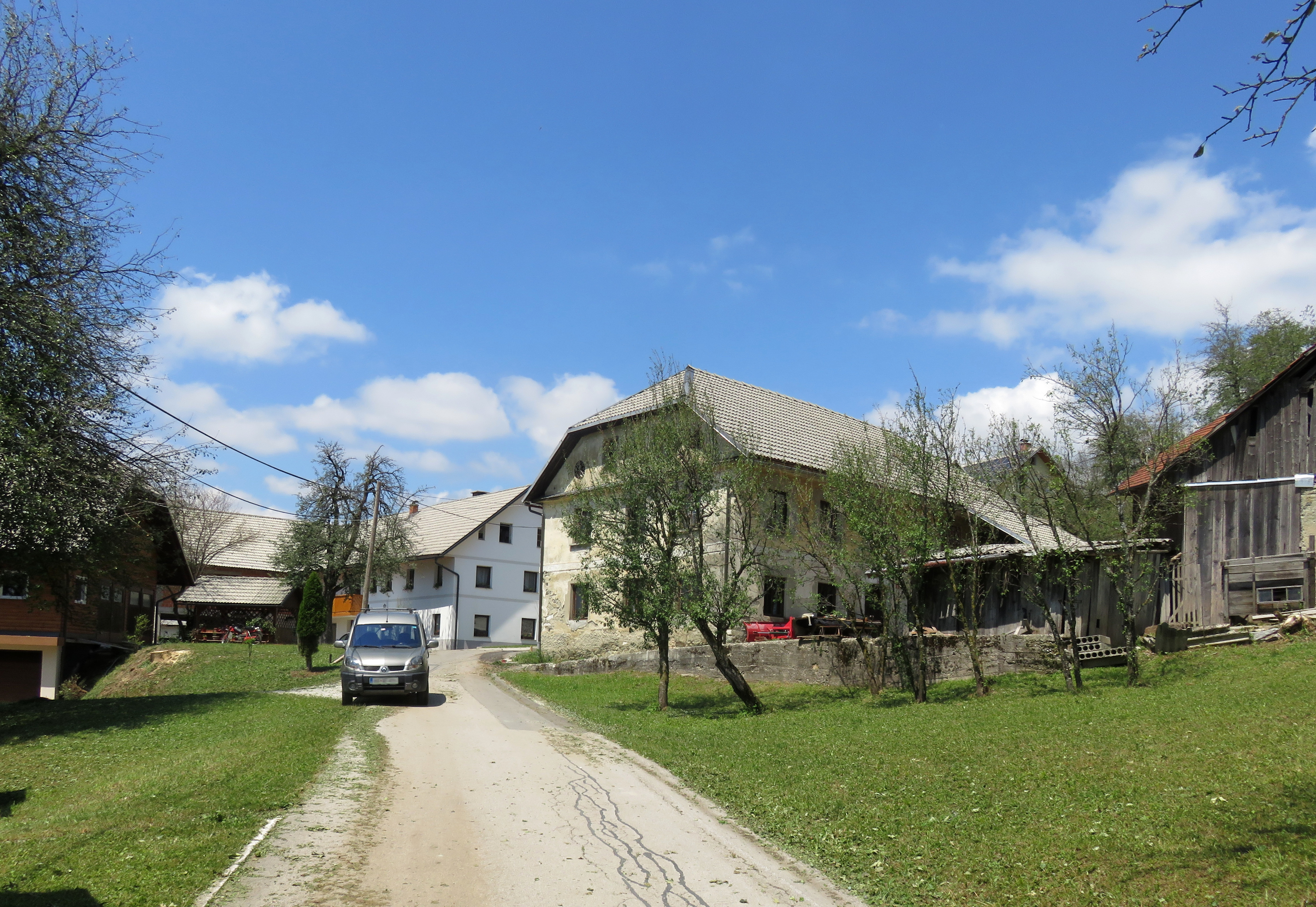

- Location in Slovenia
- Coordinates: 46°13′57.81″N 14°10′52.96″E
- Country: Slovenia
- Traditional Region: Upper Carniola
- Statistical region: Upper Carniola
- Municipality: Železniki

Area
  - Total: 1.370 km^{2} (0.529 sq mi)
- Elevation: 743 m (2,438 ft)

Population (2026)
  - Total: 66
  - Density: 48/km^{2} (120/sq mi)

Kališe (pronounced [kaˈliːʃɛ]; in older sources also Kališče, German: Kalische) is a settlement in the Municipality of Železniki in the Upper Carniola region of Slovenia. In January 2026, the population was 66.

== Name ==
The name Kališe is derived from the Slovene common noun kal '(small) pond' and refers to a place with such a feature. Other Slovene toponyms with the same root include Kal, Kalce, Kališče, Kališnik, and Kalše.

== History ==
The Slovene Home Guard had a base with three bunkers at the church above Kališe during the Second World War. On 10 March 1945 it was attacked and taken by the Slovene Partisans.

== Church ==
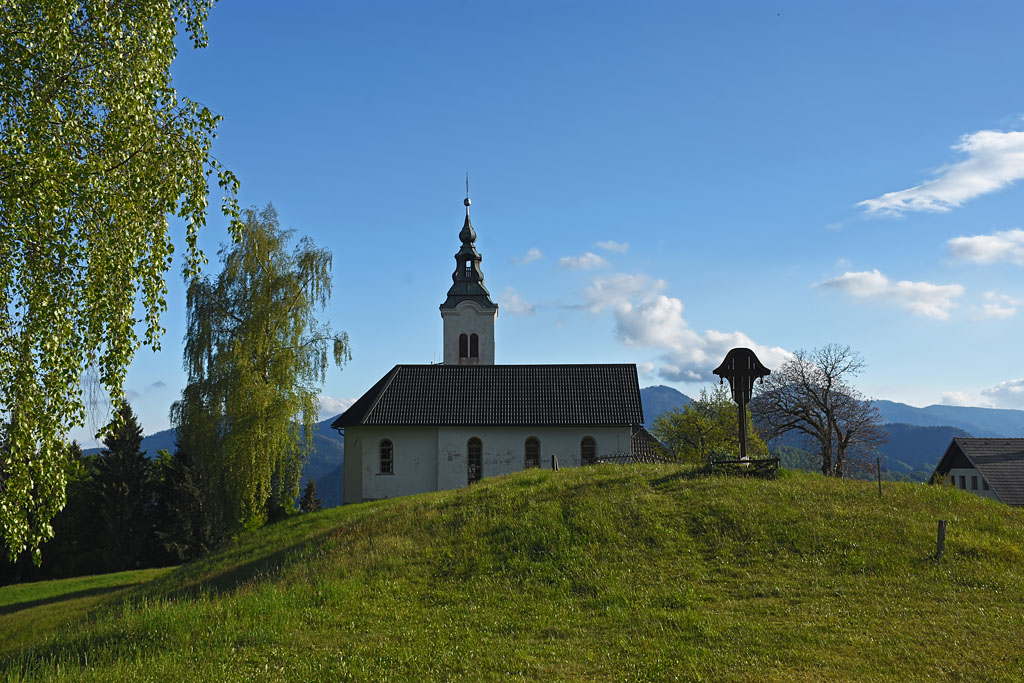
Holy Cross Church

The local church on the hill above the settlement is dedicated to the Holy Cross.
