= Dobriška Vas =

- Location in Slovenia
- Coordinates: 46°21′48.85″N 15°27′18.94″E
- Country: Slovenia
- Traditional region: Styria
- Statistical region: Drava
- Municipality: Oplotnica

Area
  - Total: 1.05 km^{2} (0.41 sq mi)
- Elevation: 312.9 m (1,027 ft)

Population (2002)
  - Total: 64

Dobriška Vas (pronounced [dɔˈbɾiːʃka ˈʋaːs]; Slovene: Dobriška vas) is a small village south of Oplotnica in eastern Slovenia. The area is part of the traditional region of Styria. The Municipality of Oplotnica is now included in the Drava Statistical Region.

A small Neo-Gothic roadside chapel in the western part of the settlement dates to the first quarter of the 20th century.
