= Studenec pri Krtini =

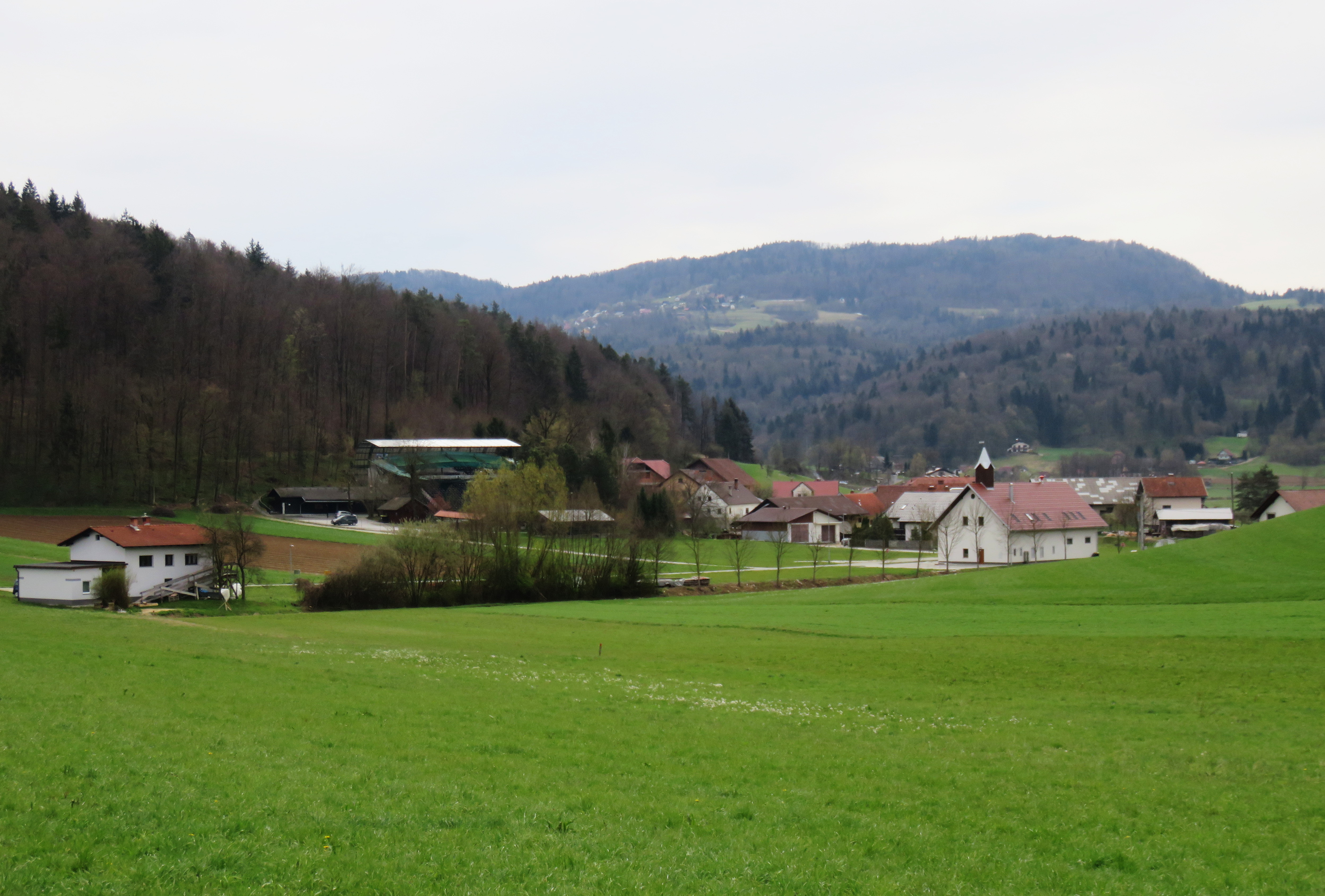

- Location in Slovenia
- Coordinates: 46°8′32.71″N 14°40′26.18″E
- Country: Slovenia
- Traditional region: Upper Carniola
- Statistical region: Central Slovenia
- Municipality: Domžale
- Elevation: 315.6 m (1,035 ft)

Population (2020)
  - Total: 75

Studenec pri Krtini (pronounced [stuˈdɛːnəts pɾi kəɾˈtiːni]; German: Studenz) is a settlement in the Municipality of Domžale in the Upper Carniola region of Slovenia.

== Name ==
The name of the settlement was changed from Studenec to Studenec pri Krtini in 1953, literally 'Studenec near Krtina'. The first part of the name, Studenec, comes from the Slovene common noun studenec 'spring'. In the past the German name was Studenz.

== History ==
The settlement used to be part of the Dominion of Krumperk.
