= Zlogona Vas =

- Location in Slovenia
- Coordinates: 46°23′55.03″N 15°27′54.17″E
- Country: Slovenia
- Traditional region: Styria
- Statistical region: Drava
- Municipality: Oplotnica

Area
  - Total: 1.21 km^{2} (0.47 sq mi)
- Elevation: 577.4 m (1,894 ft)

Population (2002)
  - Total: 65

Zlogona Vas (pronounced [ˈzloːɡɔna ˈʋaːs], Slovene: Zlogona vas) is a village in the Municipality of Oplotnica in eastern Slovenia. It lies in the hills northeast of Čadram. The area is part of the traditional region of Styria. The municipality is now included in the Drava Statistical Region.

Two small roadside chapels in the settlement date to 1867 and the early 20th century.
