= Zgornje Grušovje =

- Location in Slovenia
- Coordinates: 46°21′53.53″N 15°29′20.63″E
- Country: Slovenia
- Traditional region: Styria
- Statistical region: Drava
- Municipality: Oplotnica

Area
  - Total: 1.33 km^{2} (0.51 sq mi)
- Elevation: 352.7 m (1,157 ft)

Population (2002)
  - Total: 107

Zgornje Grušovje (pronounced [ˈzɡoːɾnjɛ ˈɡɾuːʃɔu̯jɛ]) is a settlement south of Prihova in the Municipality of Oplotnica in eastern Slovenia. The area is part of the traditional region of Styria and is included in the Drava Statistical Region.
