= Lačna Gora =

- Location in Slovenia
- Coordinates: 46°23′44.89″N 15°26′57.44″E
- Country: Slovenia
- Traditional region: Styria
- Statistical region: Drava
- Municipality: Oplotnica

Area
  - Total: 1.3 km^{2} (0.50 sq mi)
- Elevation: 515.8 m (1,692 ft)

Population (2002)
  - Total: 167

Lačna Gora (pronounced [ˈlaːtʃna ˈɡɔːɾa]; German: Latschenberg) is a settlement in the southern Pohorje Hills north of Oplotnica in eastern Slovenia. The area is part of the traditional Styria region. The Municipality of Oplotnica is now included in the Drava Statistical Region.
