= Koritno, Oplotnica =

Koritno
- Location in Slovenia
- Coordinates: 46°24′4.51″N 15°26′8.44″E
- Country: Slovenia
- Traditional region: Styria
- Statistical region: Drava
- Municipality: Oplotnica

Area
  - Total: 3.8 km^{2} (1.5 sq mi)
- Elevation: 651.3 m (2,137 ft)

Population (2002)
  - Total: 192

Koritno (pronounced [kɔˈɾiːtnɔ]) is a settlement in the Municipality of Oplotnica in eastern Slovenia. It is dispersed on the southern slopes of the Pohorje range to the north of Oplotnica. The area is part of the traditional region of Styria. The municipality is now included in the Drava Statistical Region.

There are two churches in the settlement. The church dedicated to Saint Nicholas dates to the 14th century and belongs to the Parish of Čadram–Oplotnica. The second church is dedicated to Saint Leonard and belongs to the Kebelj parish. It dates to the early 15th century with a 17th-century belfry.
