= Klopce =

Klopce may refer to the following:

- Klopce, Žužemberk
- Klopce, Dol pri Ljubljani
- Klopce, Slovenska Bistrica
