= Gorica pri Oplotnici =

- Location in Slovenia
- Coordinates: 46°23′10.43″N 15°26′7.08″E
- Country: Slovenia
- Traditional region: Styria
- Statistical region: Drava
- Municipality: Oplotnica

Area
  - Total: 0.73 km^{2} (0.28 sq mi)
- Elevation: 412.4 m (1,353 ft)

Population (2002)
  - Total: 211

Gorica pri Oplotnici (pronounced [ɡɔˈɾiːtsa pɾi ɔˈploːtnitsi], in older sources Gorični Vrh, German: Goritzenberg) is a settlement on the western edge of Oplotnica in eastern Slovenia. The area is part of the traditional region of Styria. The entire Municipality of Oplotnica is included in the Drava Statistical Region.
