= Malahorna =

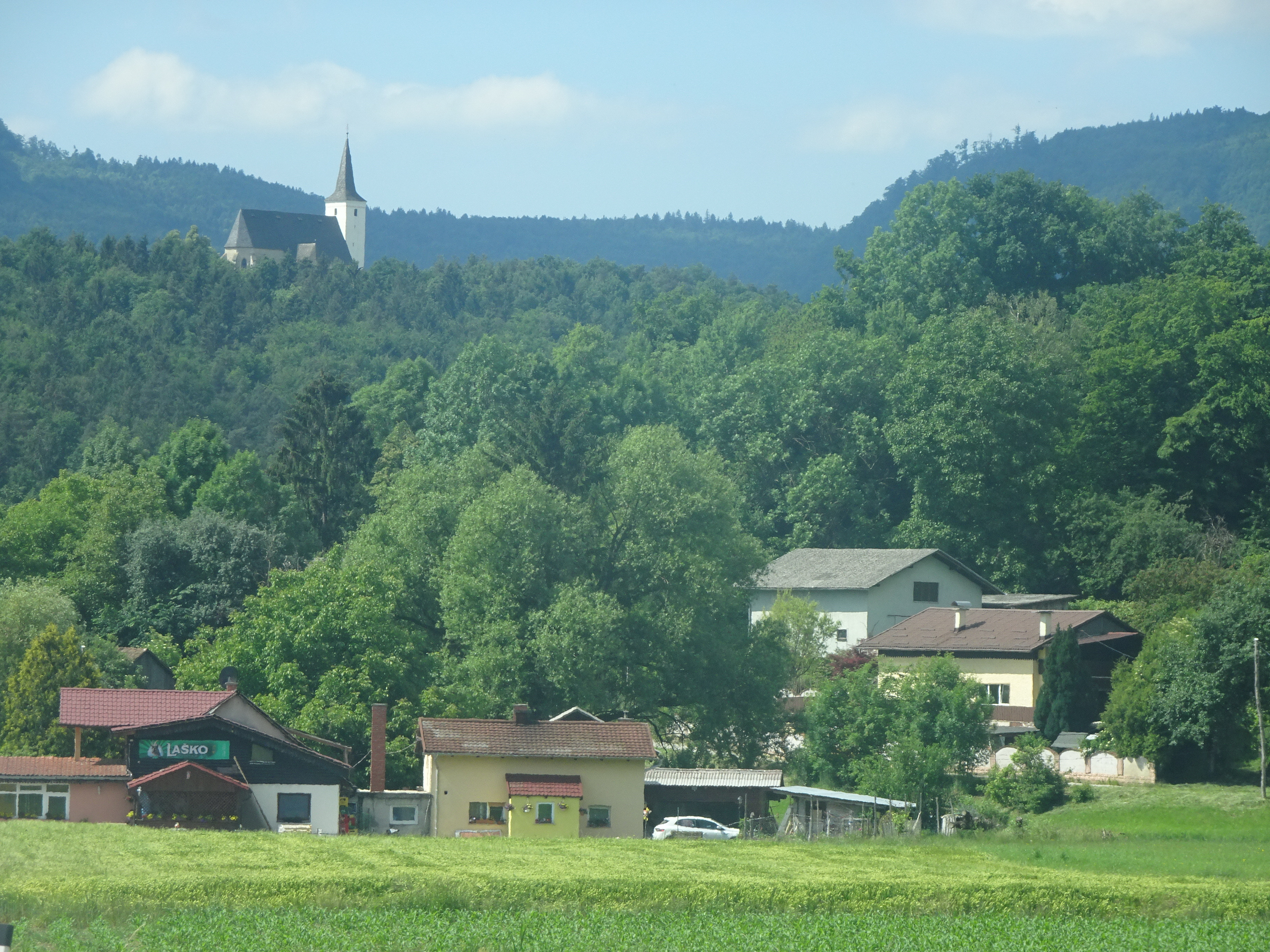

- Location in Slovenia
- Coordinates: 46°22′23.8″N 15°26′4.36″E
- Country: Slovenia
- Traditional region: Styria
- Statistical region: Drava
- Municipality: Oplotnica

Area
  - Total: 2.05 km^{2} (0.79 sq mi)
- Elevation: 350 m (1,150 ft)

Population (2002)
  - Total: 253

Malahorna (pronounced [malaˈxoːɾna], in older sources: Maloharna, German: Malahorn) is a village in the Municipality of Oplotnica in eastern Slovenia. The area is part of the traditional region of Styria. The municipality is now included in the Drava Statistical Region.

The local church, built on a low hill south of the settlement, is dedicated to Saint Barbara and belongs to the parish of Čadram–Oplotnica. It dates to the mid-15th century with 17th-century additions.
