= Krumperk Castle =

Coordinates: 46°8′4.06″N 14°38′0.4″E

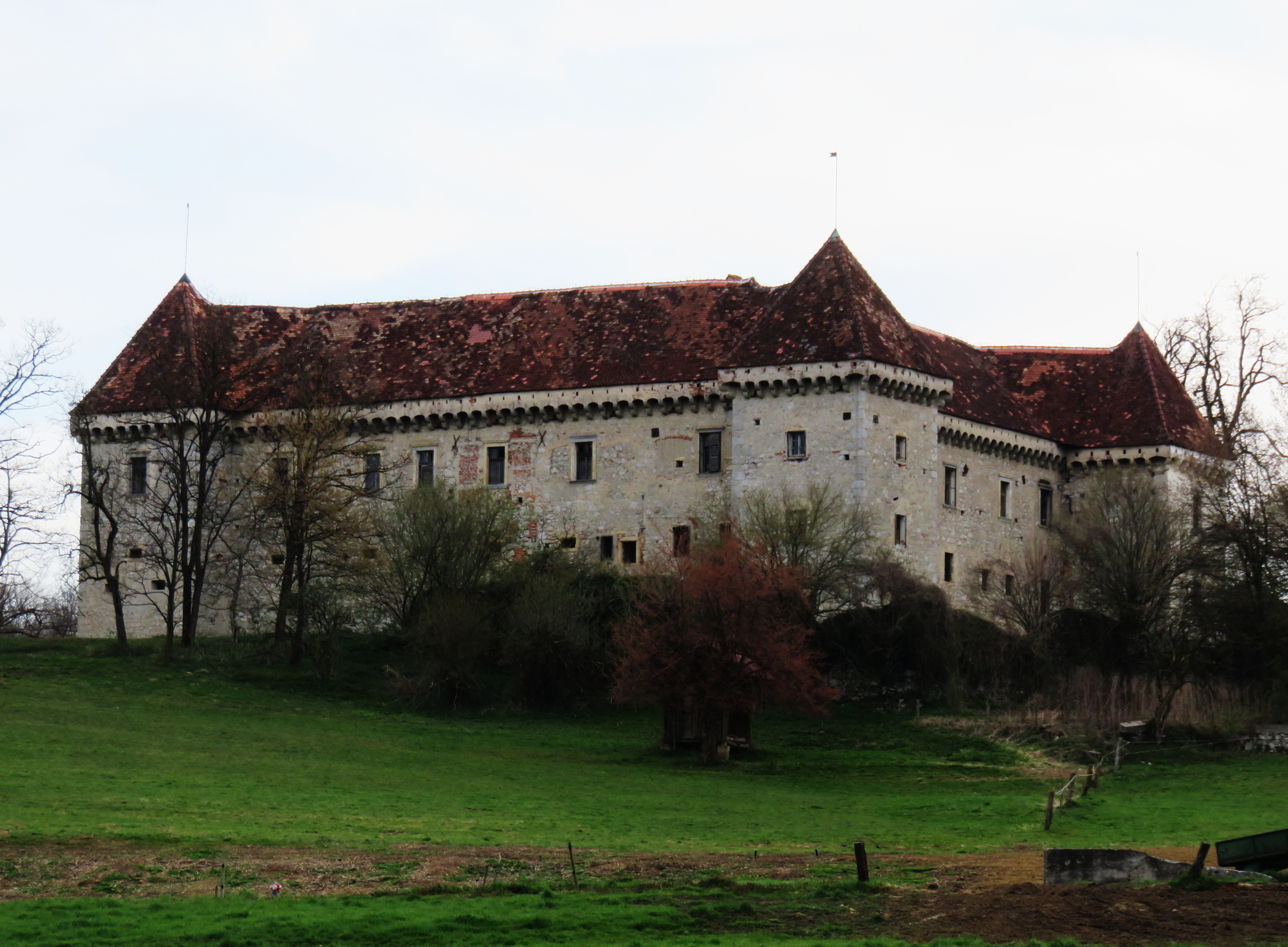
Krumperk Castle from the southwest

Krumperk Castle (Slovene: Grad Krumperk, German: Kreutberg) is a castle located in Gorjuša near the town of Domžale in central Slovenia.

== History ==
According to Valvasor, the castle was built in the late 13th century by the noble Rabensbergs from Koprivnik. The predecessor of the current castle was first mentioned in 1338 as a possession of Herkules of Krumperk, of the noble house of Kreutberg. By the 15th century, it belonged to the house of Rusbach, which sold it to Engelhand Zellenperger in 1410 under the name Turn Chraw-perg. Valvasor notes that it had once been called either Thurn unter Kreutberg or Thurn zu Kreutberg, although there is confusion as to which of these names referred to Krumperk Castle and which to the ruin of Koprivnik (Rabensberg) Castle near Moravče.

At the end of the 16th century, the male Zellenperger line became extinct, and the castle passed by inheritance accord to the older branch of the house of Rauber, one of the most prominent noble families in 15th and 16th century Carniola, who were later elevated to barons. The best-known member of the family was Adam von Rauber, who participated in the Battle of Sisak. At its height, the Krumperk lordship contained the settlements of Dob, Ihan, Krtina, Brezovica, and Studenec.

The Raubers replaced the old castle with the current building in 1580. Their line eventually became extinct; the daughter of the last Baron Rauber was the mother of the historian Johann Weikhard von Valvasor. The next owners, in 1631, were the Rasp family, followed by the counts Thurn und Valsássina, then in 1840 the barons Rechbach, who in 1928 moved to Austria after selling the estate to its final private owner, Stanka Pogačnik, a landowner from Ruše near Maribor.

After World War II, the castle was nationalized and stripped of its furnishings. The communist authorities converted the structure into a sanatorium for wounded military officers; in 1953, it was given to the Municipality of Domžale, which subdivided it into apartment housing. In 1985, the Krumperk holdings were partitioned; the castle went to Agrokombinat and the estate was taken over by Biotechnical Faculty of the University of Ljubljana, which established an equestrian center.

Today, the castle is the subject of a denationalization proceeding and is in a fairly poor state of repair. The Spelunkers' Club (Slovene: Jamarski dom) is located nearby, as are two karst caves: Iron Cave (Železna jama) and Hag's Cave (Babja jama). The castle meadow hosts the Krumperk Equestrian Club, sponsored by the Veterinary Faculty of the University of Ljubljana.

Tales of the castle's past are collected in the book Jutro ob kresu (Morning Beside the Bonfire) by Ivan Sivec.
