= Markečica =

- Location in Slovenia
- Coordinates: 46°22′2.27″N 15°26′43.5″E
- Country: Slovenia
- Traditional region: Styria
- Statistical region: Drava
- Municipality: Oplotnica

Area
  - Total: 1.95 km^{2} (0.75 sq mi)
- Elevation: 322.1 m (1,057 ft)

Population (2002)
  - Total: 118

Markečica (pronounced [ˈmaːɾkɛtʃitsa], in older sources: Markočica, German: Markusdorf) is a village in the Municipality of Oplotnica in eastern Slovenia. It lies on the flatlands south of Oplotnica. The area is part of the traditional region of Styria. The municipality is now included in the Drava Statistical Region.

== Mass grave ==
Markečica is the site of a mass grave from the end of the Second World War. The Partovec Mass Grave (Slovene: Grobišče Partovec) is located in the woods 850 meters (2,790 ft) north of Pobrež, behind a vacation house at Partovec Pond. It contains the remains of German prisoners of war murdered in May 1945.

== Cultural heritage ==
The Roman road from Celeia to Poetovio led through the area and parts of the embankments are still visible.
