= Kovaški Vrh =

- Location in Slovenia
- Coordinates: 46°23′58″N 15°24′51.61″E
- Country: Slovenia
- Traditional region: Styria
- Statistical region: Drava
- Municipality: Oplotnica

Area
  - Total: 1.44 km^{2} (0.56 sq mi)
- Elevation: 644.1 m (2,113 ft)

Population (2024)
  - Total: 48

Kovaški Vrh (pronounced [kɔˈʋaːʃki ˈʋəɾx]; German: Schmidsberg) is a dispersed settlement in the Municipality of Oplotnica in eastern Slovenia. It lies in the hills northwest of Oplotnica. The area is part of the traditional region of Styria and is now included in the Drava Statistical Region.
