= Dobrova pri Prihovi =

Dobrova pri Prihovi Dobrova (until 1998)
- Location in Slovenia
- Coordinates: 46°21′49.26″N 15°28′18.37″E
- Country: Slovenia
- Traditional region: Styria
- Statistical region: Drava
- Municipality: Oplotnica

Area
  - Total: 1.28 km^{2} (0.49 sq mi)
- Elevation: 316.3 m (1,038 ft)

Population (2015)
  - Total: 48

Dobrova pri Prihovi (pronounced [ˈdoːbɾɔʋa pɾi ˈpɾiːxɔʋi]) is a small settlement in the Municipality of Oplotnica in eastern Slovenia. The area is part of the traditional region of Styria. It is now included in the Drava Statistical Region.

== Name ==
The settlement was named Dobrova until 1998, when it was renamed Dobrova pri Prihovi (literally, 'Dobrova near Prihova') to differentiate it from other settlements with the same name. The name Dobrova is shared with several other places in Slovenia and is derived from Common Slavic *dǫbrova 'place where there is a deciduous or oak forest', in turn derived from *dǫbъ 'deciduous tree, oak'. Like similar names (e.g., Dobrovce, Dobrovnik, Zadobrova), it originally referred to the local vegetation.
