= Raskovec =

- Location in Slovenia
- Coordinates: 46°22′30.31″N 15°28′38.37″E
- Country: Slovenia
- Traditional region: Styria
- Statistical region: Drava
- Municipality: Oplotnica

Area
  - Total: 0.72 km^{2} (0.28 sq mi)
- Elevation: 365.5 m (1,199 ft)

Population (2002)
  - Total: 62

Raskovec (pronounced [ˈɾaːskɔʋəts]) is a small settlement in the Municipality of Oplotnica in eastern Slovenia. It lies on a slope above Čadram Creek (Čadramski potok) southeast of Oplotnica. The area is part of the traditional region of Styria. The municipality is now included in the Drava Statistical Region.

A roadside chapel in the centre of the village dates from the late 19th century.
