= Božje =

- Location in Slovenia
- Coordinates: 46°24′59.78″N 15°25′13.16″E
- Country: Slovenia
- Traditional region: Styria
- Statistical region: Drava
- Municipality: Oplotnica

Area
  - Total: 2.58 km^{2} (1.00 sq mi)
- Elevation: 887.5 m (2,912 ft)

Population (2002)
  - Total: 143

Božje (pronounced [ˈbɔːʒjɛ]; German: Woschje) is a village in the Municipality of Oplotnica in eastern Slovenia. It lies on the southern slopes of the Pohorje range to the northwest of Oplotnica. The area is part of the traditional region of Styria. The municipality is now included in the Drava Statistical Region.

The village chapel is a small Neo-gothic building with a wooden belfry. It was built in 1924 on the site of an earlier chapel.
