= Municipality of Oplotnica =

Municipality of Slovenia

Municipality of Oplotnica Občina Oplotnica
- Municipality
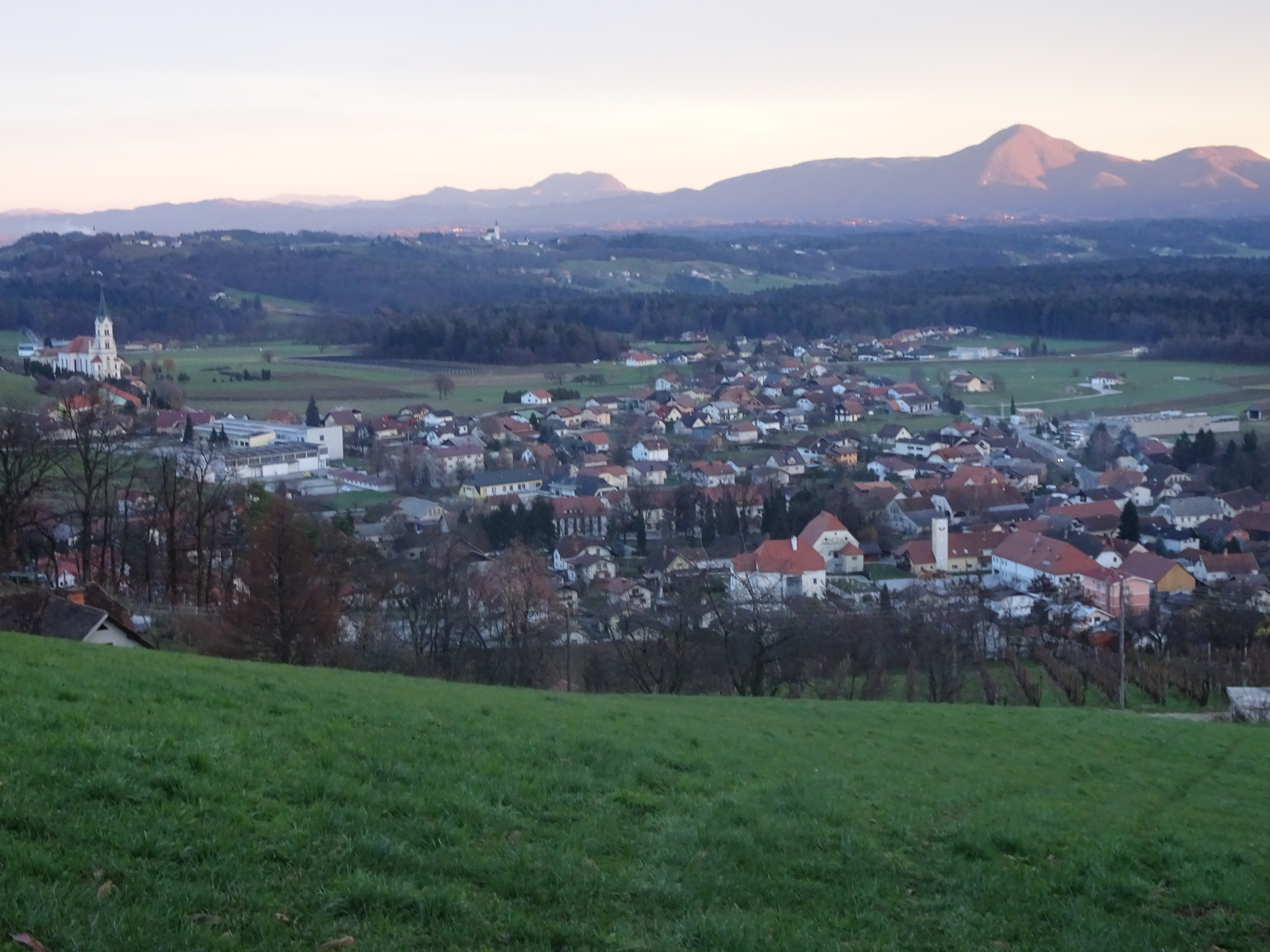

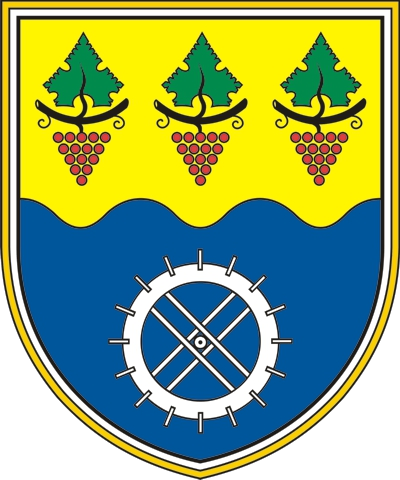
- Coat of arms

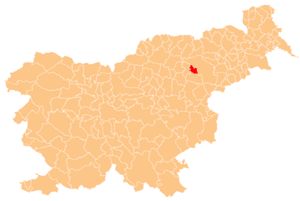
- Location of the Municipality of Oplotnica in Slovenia
- Coordinates: 46°19′N 15°40′E
- Country: Slovenia

Government
  - Mayor: Matjaž Orter

Area
  - Total: 33.2 km^{2} (12.8 sq mi)

Population (2016)
  - Total: 4,116
  - Density: 124/km^{2} (321/sq mi)
- Time zone: UTC+01 (CET)
  - Summer (DST): UTC+02 (CEST)
- Website: www.oplotnica.si

The Municipality of Oplotnica (pronounced [ɔˈploːtnitsa]; Slovene: Občina Oplotnica) is a municipality in the traditional region of Styria in northeastern Slovenia. The seat of the municipality is the town of Oplotnica. It was formed in 1998, when it was split from the Municipality of Slovenska Bistrica.

Oplotnica and the neighboring municipalities in the region

== Settlements ==
In addition to the municipal seat of Oplotnica, the municipality also includes the following settlements:

- Božje
- Brezje pri Oplotnici
- Čadram
- Dobriška Vas
- Dobrova pri Prihovi
- Gorica pri Oplotnici
- Koritno
- Kovaški Vrh
- Lačna Gora
- Malahorna
- Markečica
- Okoška Gora
- Pobrež
- Prihova
- Raskovec
- Straža pri Oplotnici
- Ugovec
- Zgornje Grušovje
- Zlogona Gora
- Zlogona Vas
