= Straža pri Oplotnici =

Straža pri Oplotnici Straža (until 1998)
- Location in Slovenia
- Coordinates: 46°22′54.98″N 15°28′25.02″E
- Country: Slovenia
- Traditional region: Styria
- Statistical region: Drava
- Municipality: Oplotnica

Area
  - Total: 0.81 km^{2} (0.31 sq mi)
- Elevation: 385 m (1,263 ft)

Population (2015)
  - Total: 72

Straža pri Oplotnici (pronounced [ˈstɾaːʒa pɾi ɔˈploːtnitsi]) is a settlement in the Municipality of Oplotnica in eastern Slovenia. The area is part of the traditional region of Styria. The municipality is now included in the Drava Statistical Region.

== Name ==
The settlement was named Straža until 1998, when it was renamed Straža pri Oplotnici (literally, 'Straža near Oplotnica') to differentiate it from other settlements with the same name. The name Straža is found in various toponyms, oronyms, and hydronyms in Slovenia. It is derived from the common noun straža 'guards, guard post', often referring to a place where watch was kept during the danger of Ottoman attacks.

== History ==
The Roman road from Celeia to Poetovio led through the area, and parts of it are still traceable.

== Cultural Heritage ==
A small chapel with a wooden belfry was built in 1947.
