= Ugovec =

- Location in Slovenia
- Coordinates: 46°23′18.53″N 15°28′47.22″E
- Country: Slovenia
- Traditional region: Styria
- Statistical region: Drava
- Municipality: Oplotnica

Area
  - Total: 1.16 km^{2} (0.45 sq mi)
- Elevation: 345.7 m (1,134 ft)

Population (2002)
  - Total: 130

Ugovec (pronounced [ˈuːɡɔʋəts]) is a settlement in the Municipality of Oplotnica in eastern Slovenia. The area is part of the traditional region of Styria. The municipality is now included in the Drava Statistical Region.

A small chapel in the settlement is a small Neo-Renaissance building with a wooden belfry. It was built in 1933.
