= Okoška Gora =

- Location in Slovenia
- Coordinates: 46°23′43.35″N 15°29′16″E
- Country: Slovenia
- Traditional region: Styria
- Statistical region: Drava
- Municipality: Oplotnica

Area
  - Total: 0.87 km^{2} (0.34 sq mi)
- Elevation: 441.8 m (1,449 ft)

Population (2002)
  - Total: 171

Okoška Gora (pronounced [ɔˈkoːʃka ˈɡɔːɾa]) is a settlement in the Municipality of Oplotnica in eastern Slovenia. It lies on the southern slopes of the Pohorje range east of Oplotnica. The area is part of the traditional region of Styria and is now included in the Drava Statistical Region.
