= Zlogona Gora =

- Location in Slovenia
- Coordinates: 46°23′38.86″N 15°27′56.42″E
- Country: Slovenia
- Traditional region: Styria
- Statistical region: Drava
- Municipality: Oplotnica

Area
  - Total: 0.56 km^{2} (0.22 sq mi)
- Elevation: 482.6 m (1,583 ft)

Population (2002)
  - Total: 83

Zlogona Gora (pronounced [ˈzloːɡɔna ˈɡɔːɾa]) is a settlement in the Municipality of Oplotnica in eastern Slovenia. It lies on the southern slopes of the Pohorje range northeast of Oplotnica. The area is part of the traditional region of Styria. The municipality is now included in the Drava Statistical Region.
