= Kebelj =

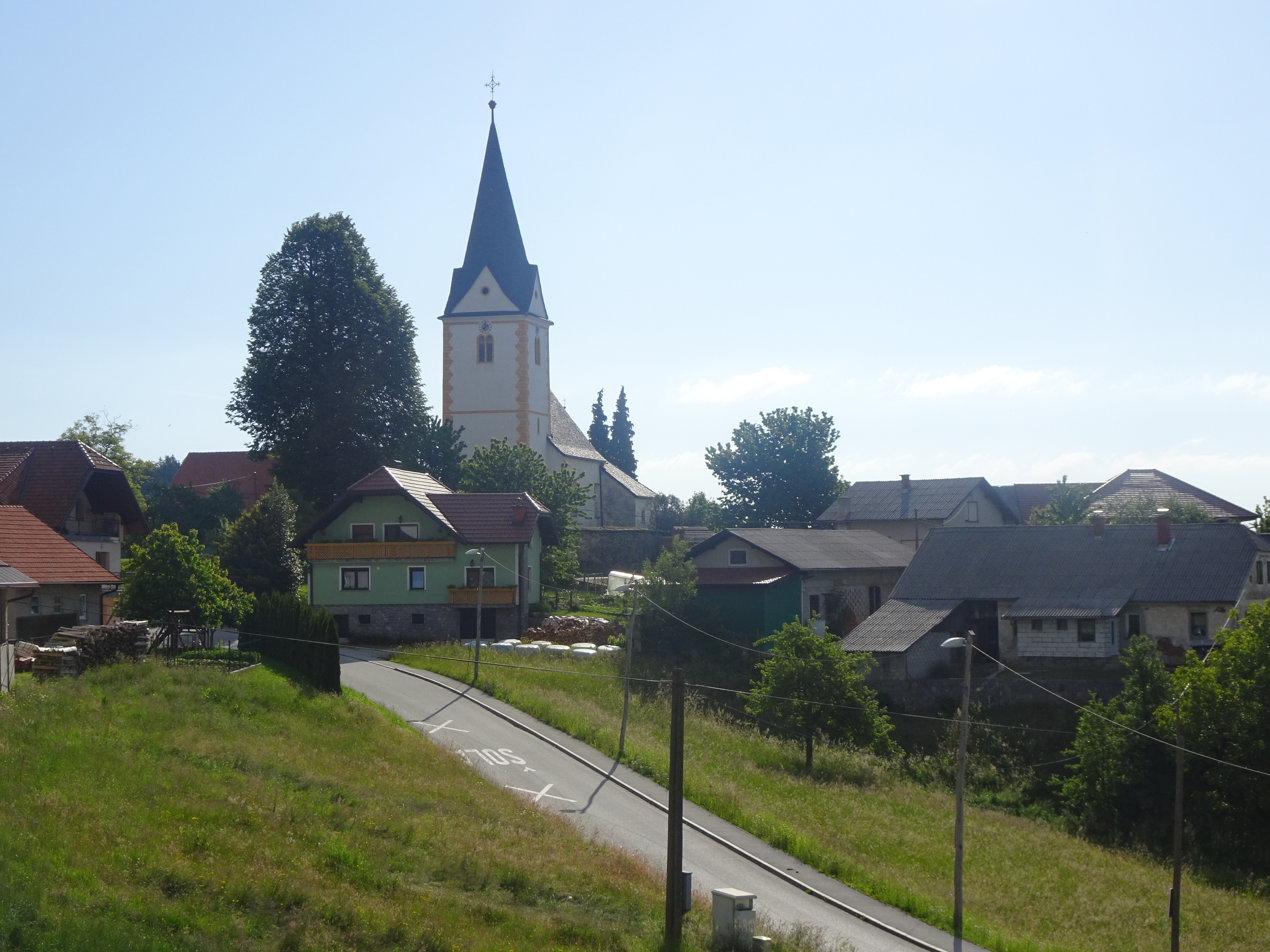

- Location in Slovenia
- Coordinates: 46°24′40.19″N 15°27′18.5″E
- Country: Slovenia
- Traditional region: Styria
- Statistical region: Drava
- Municipality: Slovenska Bistrica

Area
  - Total: 1.62 km^{2} (0.63 sq mi)
- Elevation: 720.3 m (2,363 ft)

Population (2002)
  - Total: 143

Kebelj (pronounced [ˈkeːbəl], German: Köbl) is a village in the Municipality of Slovenska Bistrica in northeastern Slovenia. It lies in the Pohorje Hills, north of Oplotnica. The area is part of the traditional region of Styria. It is now included with the rest of the municipality in the Drava Statistical Region.

The parish church in the settlement is dedicated to Saint Margaret (Slovene: Sveta Marjeta) and belongs to the Roman Catholic Archdiocese of Maribor. It dates to the late 14th century, with numerous later adaptations.
