= Brezje pri Oplotnici =

Brezje pri Oplotnici Brezje (until 1998)
- Location in Slovenia
- Coordinates: 46°23′2.78″N 15°25′34.25″E
- Country: Slovenia
- Traditional region: Styria
- Statistical region: Drava
- Municipality: Oplotnica

Area
  - Total: 3.14 km^{2} (1.21 sq mi)
- Elevation: 398.3 m (1,307 ft)

Population (2015)
  - Total: 134

Brezje pri Oplotnici (pronounced [ˈbɾeːzjɛ pɾi ɔˈploːtnitsi]) is a settlement in the Municipality of Oplotnica in eastern Slovenia. It lies in the hills between Oplotnica and Zreče. The area is part of the traditional region of Styria. The municipality is now included in the Drava Statistical Region.

== Name ==
The settlement was named Brezje until 1998, when it was renamed Brezje pri Oplotnici (literally, 'Brezje near Oplotnica') to differentiate it from other settlements with the same name. The name Brezje is shared with several other places in Slovenia and is derived from the word brezje 'birch grove'.

== Church ==
A church on Mount Juniper (Brinjeva gora) southwest of the settlement is dedicated to Saint Agnes (Slovene: Sveta Neža) and belongs to the parish of Zreče. It was built between 1726 and 1732.
