= Fran Detela =

Slovenian writer and university professor

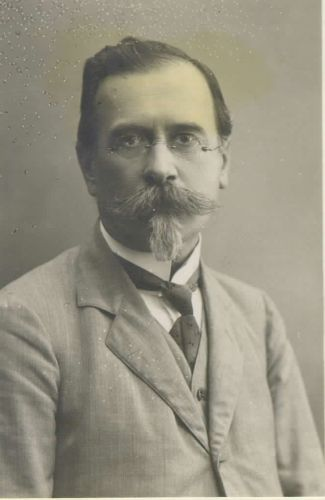
- Born: 3 December 1850; Moravče
- Died: 11 July 1926 (aged 75); Ljubljana
- Occupations: Writer and professor

Fran Detela (3 December 1850 – 11 July 1926) was a Slovenian writer and university professor.

== Life and work ==
Malo življenje (1908)

Detela was born in Moravče in the Upper Carniola region of present-day Slovenia. He finished his secondary schooling in Ljubljana (he was a classmate of Ivan Tavčar) and later went to Vienna to study classical languages and French. After he finished his studies there, he became a professor in the city and later a principal at the Novo Mesto High School, where he served from 1890 until 1906.

Detela was a Catholic writer. His first published work was the short novel Malo življenje. It was published in the magazine Ljubljanski zvon in 1882. In it, and also in the later novels Prihajač (1888) and Gospod Lisec (1894), he realistically depicts the life of the Slovenian peasantry and the first occurrences of "village capitalism." The writer, familiar with French realism and its milieus, sometimes depicted them, but his major beliefs were not shared with the movement's ideology. He was more of a traditionalist and a patriarchist.

His arguably best work, Trojka (1897), describes the lives of three village noblemen and three high-schoolers from Lower Carniola, who were studying in Vienna at the time. The confiding Lovro Bojanec goes through many experiences and later finds his way into family life, the hard-working and exemplary Dr. Vladimir Dragan becomes a tragic ruin, and the dandy exploiter Radivoj Čuk continually proclaims his patriotism while sitting in Viennese cafés. The principal female character of the story is a coquette, Irma Majer, who makes the trio fall in love with her, but is later shot by her suitor, Baron Berger.

Detela also had a good sense of humor and the light side of life, but his satire was not bitter. He is said to have been more of a teacher than an artist in most of his work. Various era-specific questions are addressed (sometimes with a learning curve and/or light irony) in the short novels Rodoljubje na deželi (1908), Novo življenje (1908), Delo in denar (1910), Sošolci (1911), Tujski promet (1912), Svetloba in senca (1916), and Vest in zakon (1927). His best comedies and satires include Kislo grozdje (1833), Žrtva razmer (1912), Spominska plošča (1914), Trpljenje značajnega moža (1916), Nova metoda (1917), and Kapitalist Rak (1923).

Detela wrote two historical novels describing the late years of the Counts of Celje: Veliki grof (1885) and Pegam in Lambergar (1891). The latter was long thought to be the best of the Slovene historical novels, but features very little psychological argumentation and tangible descriptions. He also wrote the short historical novels Hudi časi (1894, describing the time of the Illyrian provinces) and Takšni so (1900, about Catholic martyrs in the Protestant era, but they are thought to be lacking in terms of content.

His comedies Učenjak (1902), Dobrodušni ljudje (1908), and Dobrodelnost (1919) describe the lighter side of life with a sense of lenient reprimand.

His most defining traits are satirical playfulness, benevolent criticism of life, and Catholic lecturing. His work further fills the gallery of Slovene men from the peasantry, proletariat, petty bourgeoisie, and intellectual community. The positive subjects are typically good, honest, hard-working, and persistent, whereas the negative are parasites, self-interested, fake patriots, speculative, and overly focused on the art or religion. He also never forgets to add a piece of moral advice or two.

Detel Street (Slovene: Detelova ulica) in Novo Mesto is named after him.

He died in Ljubljana at the age of 75.
