= Brezovica pri Dobu =

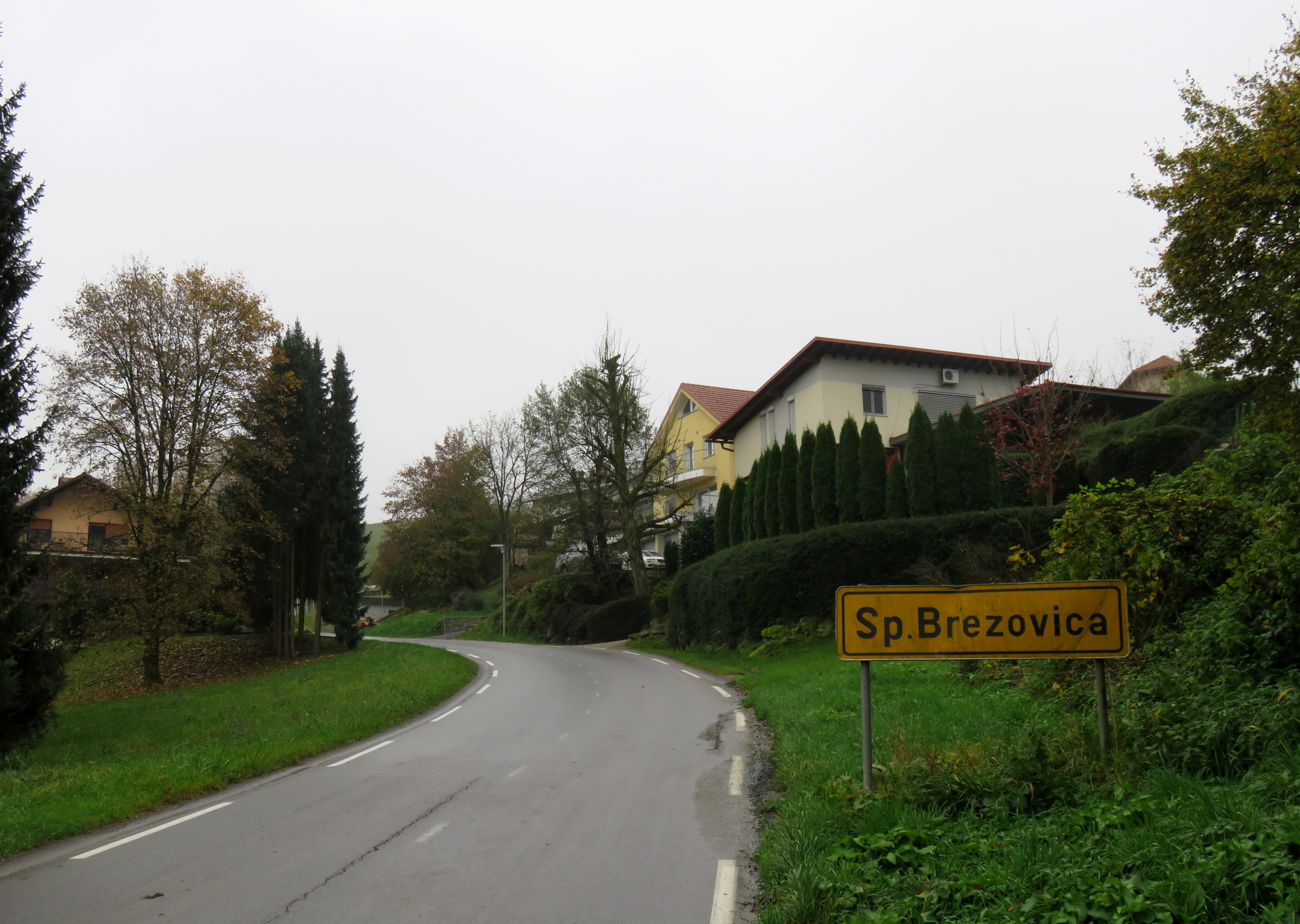

- Location in Slovenia
- Coordinates: 46°7′59.14″N 14°39′14.16″E
- Country: Slovenia
- Traditional region: Upper Carniola
- Statistical region: Central Slovenia
- Municipality: Domžale
- Elevation: 350.5 m (1,150 ft)

Population (2020)
  - Total: 62

Brezovica pri Dobu (pronounced [ˈbɾéːzɔʋitsa pɾi ˈdóːbu]; German: Bresowitz) is a settlement in the Municipality of Domžale in the Upper Carniola region of Slovenia. It includes the hamlets of Spodnja Brezovica (German: Unterbresowitz) and Zgornja Brezovica (German: Oberbresowitz).

== History ==
The settlement is a former part of the Krumperk lordship.

== Name ==
The name of the settlement was changed from Brezovica to Brezovica pri Dobu in 1953. In the past the German name was Bresowitz.
