= Pobrež =

- Location in Slovenia
- Coordinates: 46°21′31.27″N 15°27′41.72″E
- Country: Slovenia
- Traditional region: Styria
- Statistical region: Drava
- Municipality: Oplotnica

Area
  - Total: 1.02 km^{2} (0.39 sq mi)
- Elevation: 306.9 m (1,007 ft)

Population (2002)
  - Total: 131

Pobrež (pronounced [ˈpoːbɾɛʃ]) is a settlement in the Municipality of Oplotnica in eastern Slovenia. It lies on the flatlands south of Oplotnica. Traditionally the entire area was part of the region of Styria. It is now included in the Drava Statistical Region.

Three roadside chapels in the settlement date to the late 19th and early 20th centuries.
