= Kostanj, Kamnik =

Kostanj
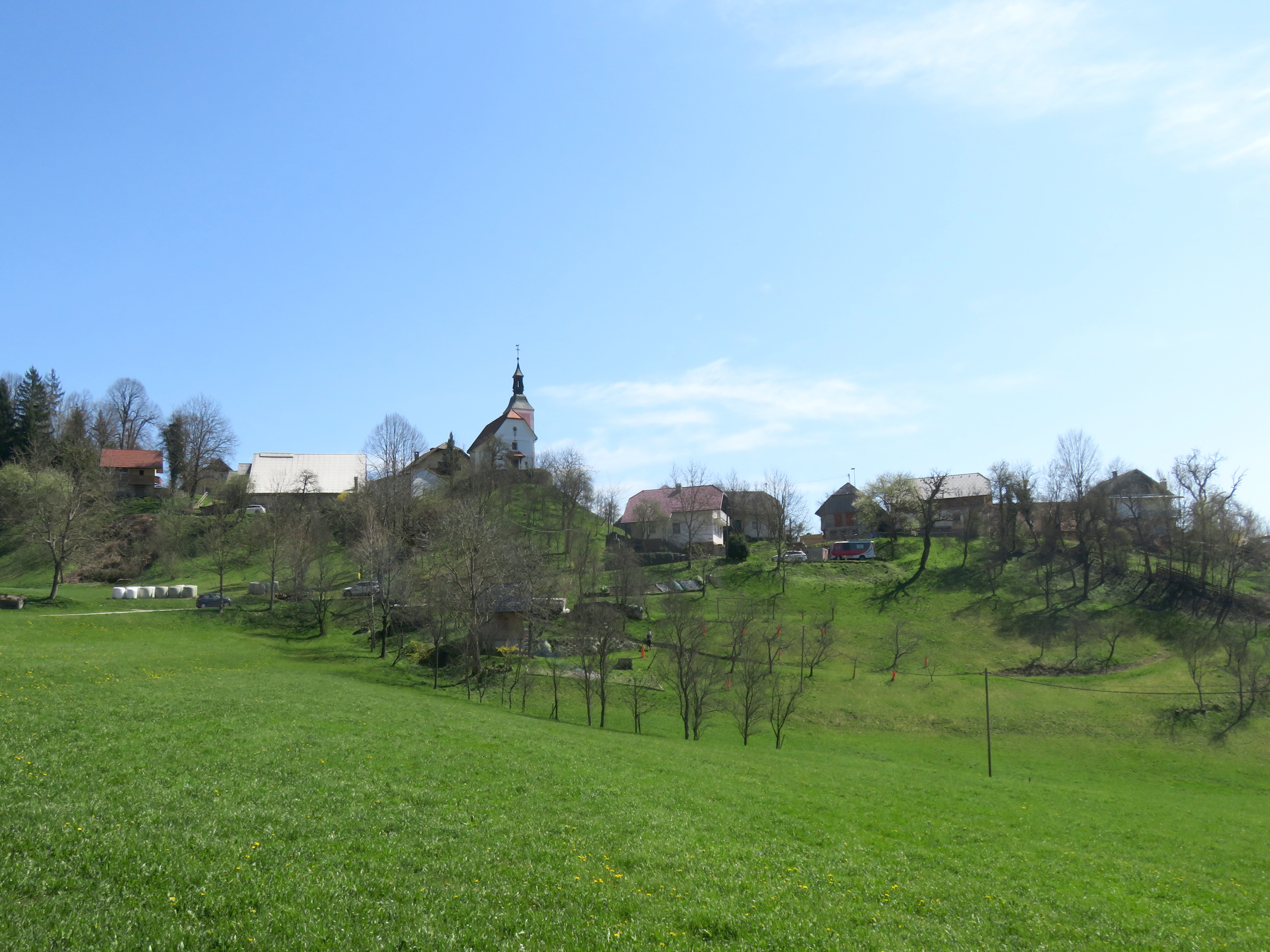

- Location in Slovenia
- Coordinates: 46°13′39.1″N 14°44′33.13″E
- Country: Slovenia
- Traditional region: Upper Carniola
- Statistical region: Central Slovenia
- Municipality: Kamnik
- Elevation: 537.9 m (1,765 ft)

Population (2002)
  - Total: 47

Kostanj (pronounced [ˈkɔːstan]) is a small village in the Municipality of Kamnik in the Upper Carniola region of Slovenia.

== Church ==
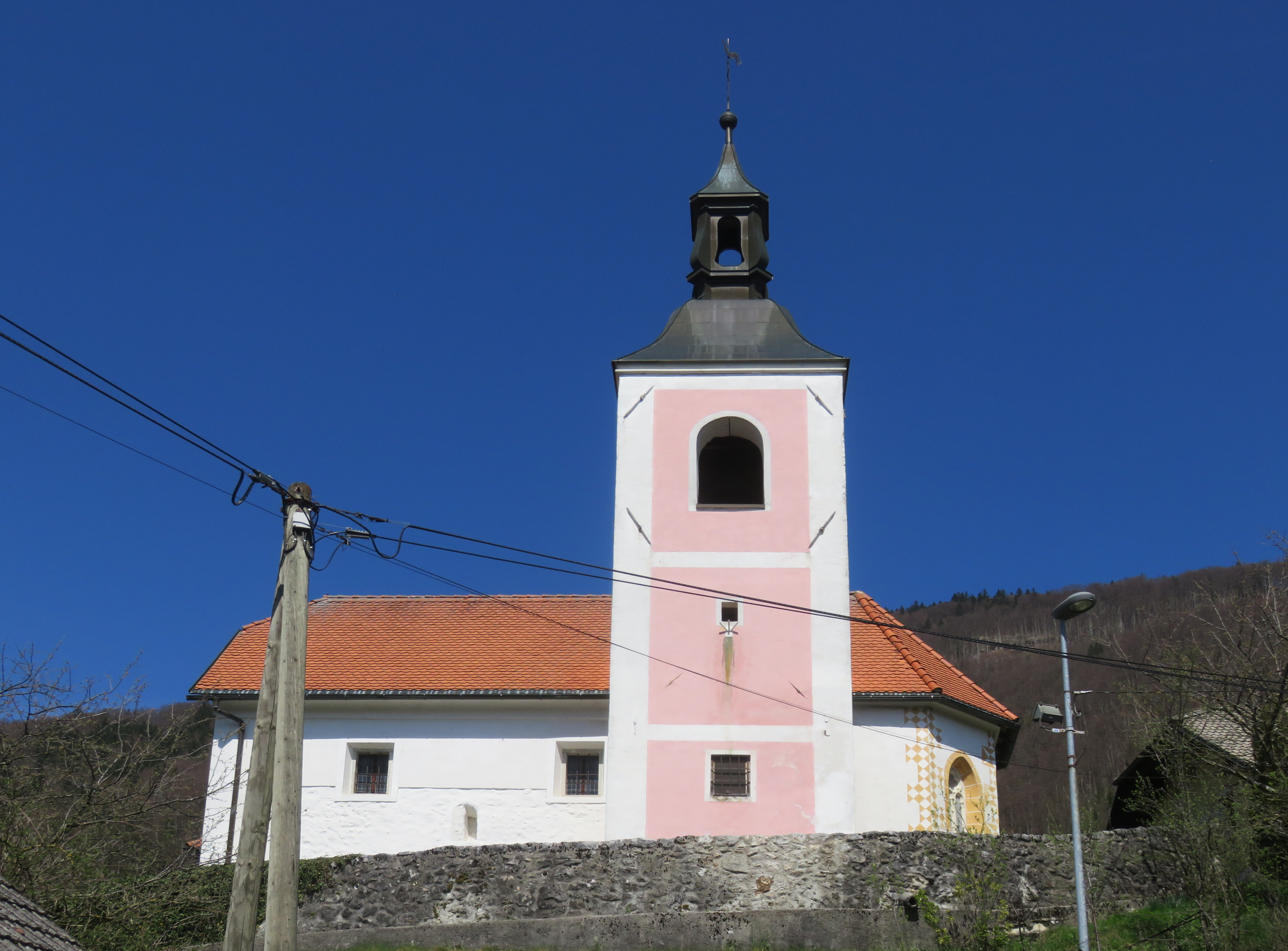
Saint Dorothy's Church

The local church is dedicated to Saint Dorothy.

== Notable people ==
Notable people that were born or lived in Kostanj include:

- Pavel Pestotnik (1879–1955), politician and organizer of the Slovenian Sokol movement
