= Krška Vas, Ivančna Gorica =

Krška Vas
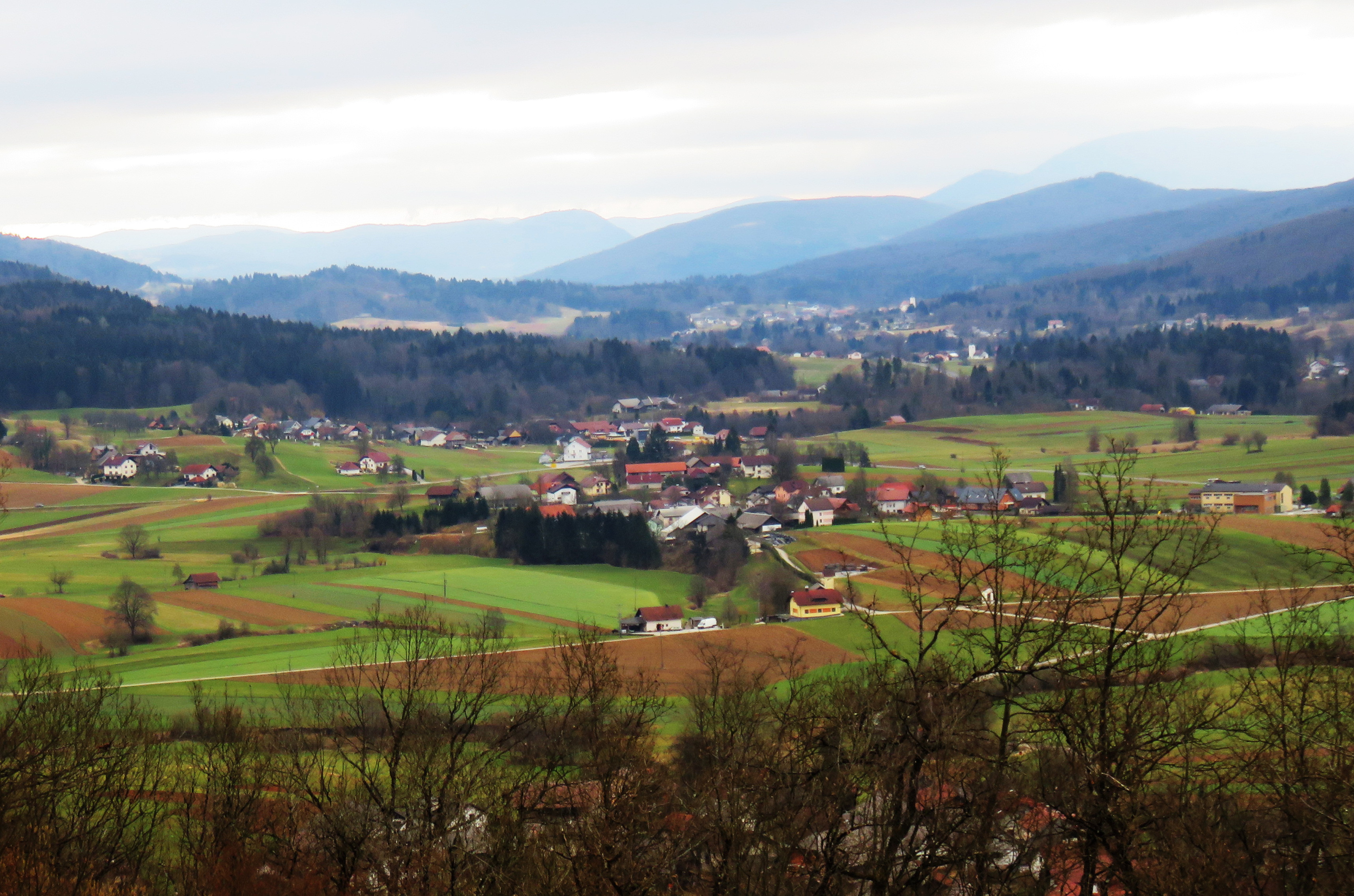

- Location in Slovenia
- Coordinates: 45°53′4.66″N 14°47′13.26″E
- Country: Slovenia
- Traditional region: Lower Carniola
- Statistical region: Central Slovenia
- Municipality: Ivančna Gorica

Area
  - Total: 1.49 km^{2} (0.58 sq mi)
- Elevation: 280.2 m (919 ft)

Population (2002)
  - Total: 133

Krška Vas (pronounced [ˈkərʃka ˈʋaːs]; Slovene: Krška vas, German: Gurkdorf) is a settlement just east of Krka, near the source of the Krka River, in the Municipality of Ivančna Gorica in central Slovenia. The area is part of the historical region of Lower Carniola. The municipality is now included in the Central Slovenia Statistical Region.

A small roadside chapel-shrine in the settlement is dedicated to Saint Joseph and was built in the last quarter of the 19th century.
