= Prihova, Oplotnica =

Prihova
- Village
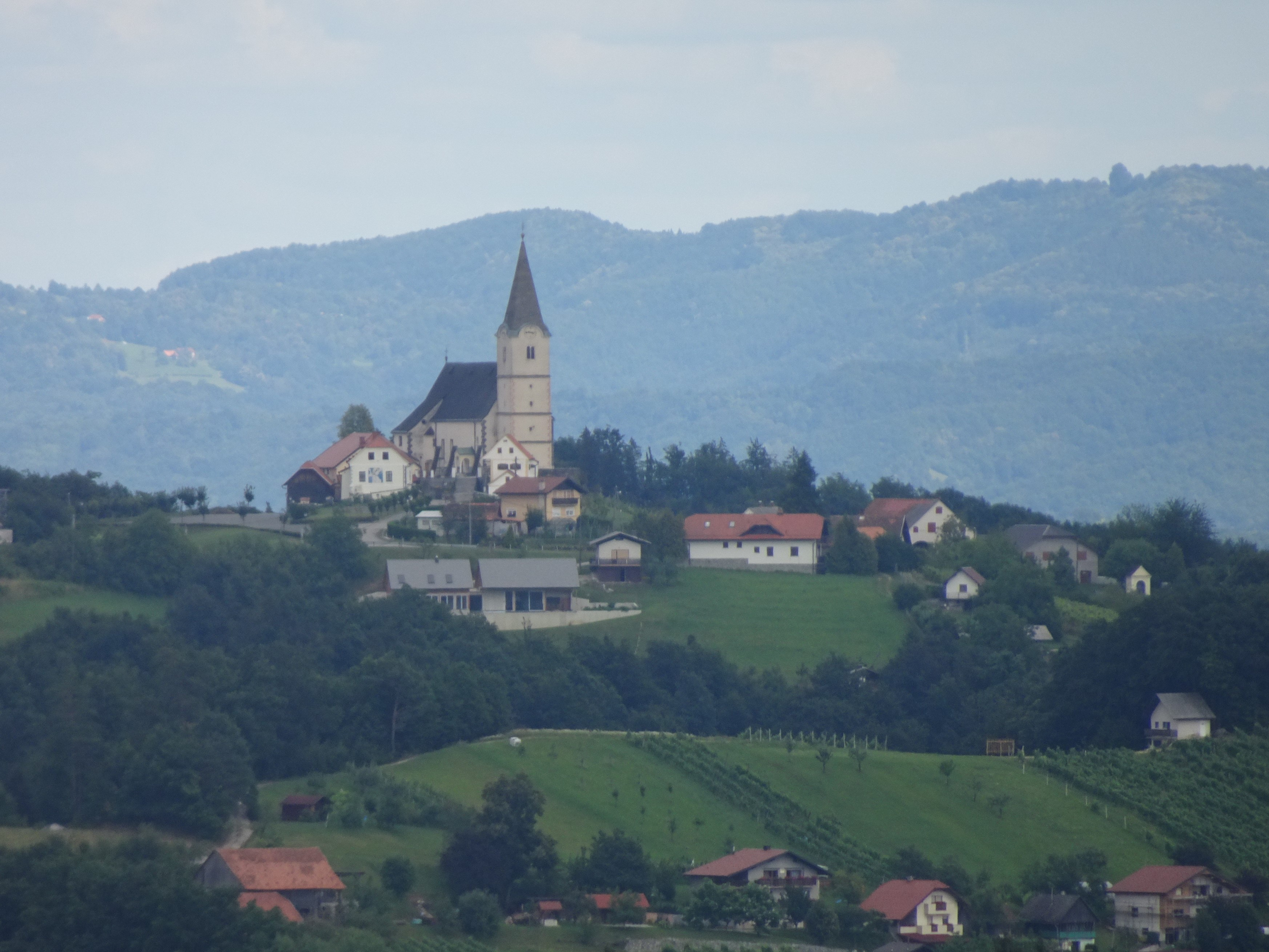

- Location in Slovenia
- Coordinates: 46°22′18.18″N 15°29′12.9″E
- Country: Slovenia
- Traditional region: Styria
- Statistical region: Drava
- Municipality: Oplotnica

Area
  - Total: 1.27 km^{2} (0.49 sq mi)
- Elevation: 402.6 m (1,321 ft)

Population (2002)
  - Total: 68

Prihova (pronounced [ˈpɾiːxɔʋa]) is a settlement in the Municipality of Oplotnica in northeastern Slovenia. The area is part of the traditional region of Styria. The municipality is now included in the Drava Statistical Region.

== Church ==
The parish church in the settlement is dedicated to the Mary, Virgin of Mercy and belongs to the Roman Catholic Archdiocese of Maribor. It is a pilgrimage church dating to the middle of the 16th century, with the bell tower built in the second half of the 16th century. In the 1740s it was renovated in the Baroque style.
