= Čadram =

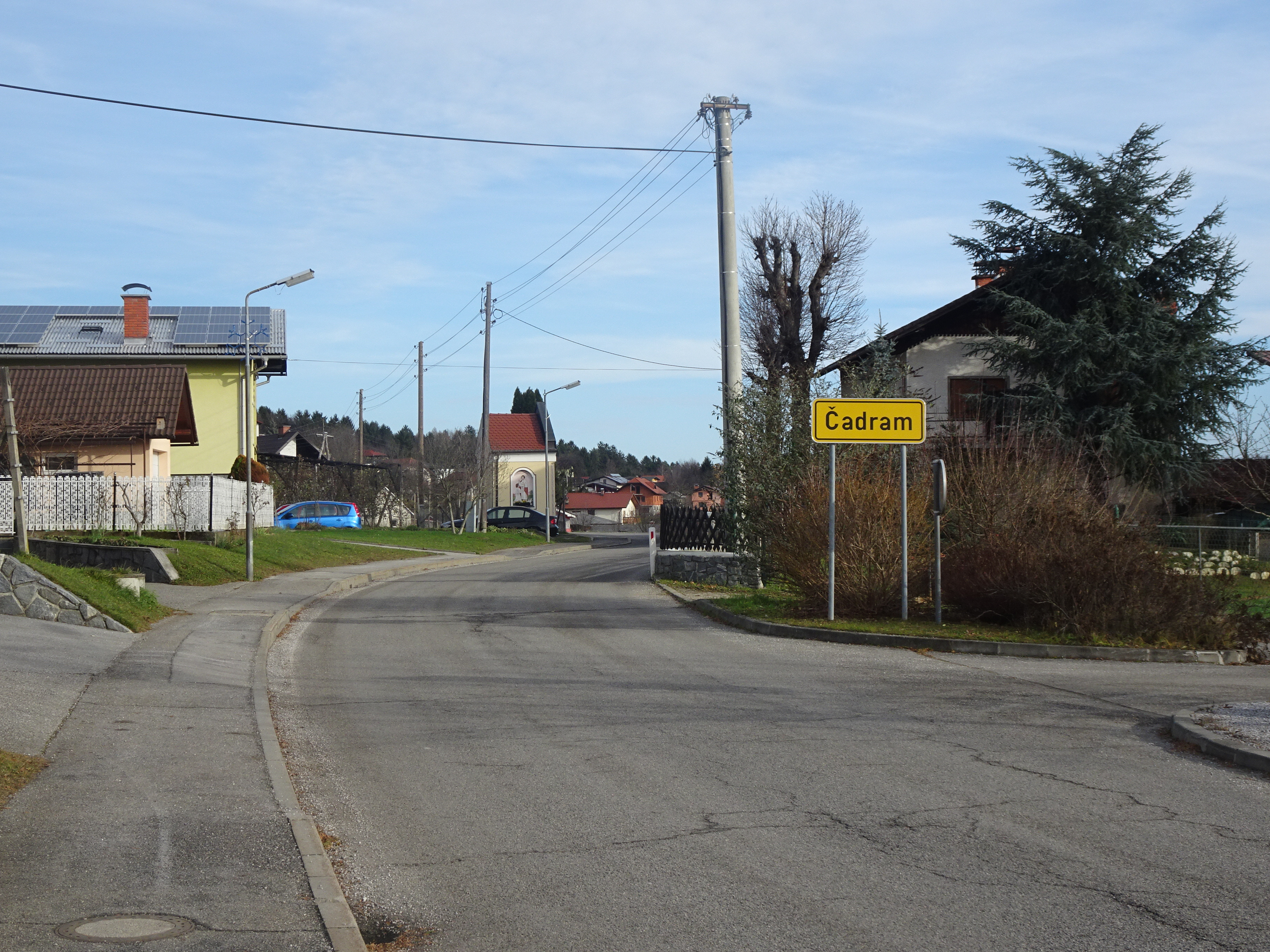

- Location in Slovenia
- Coordinates: 46°23′21.75″N 15°27′32.36″E
- Country: Slovenia
- Traditional region: Styria
- Statistical region: Drava
- Municipality: Oplotnica

Area
  - Total: 1.28 km^{2} (0.49 sq mi)
- Elevation: 395.9 m (1,299 ft)

Population (2002)
  - Total: 251

Čadram (pronounced [ˈtʃaːdɾam], German: Tschadram) is a settlement in the Municipality of Oplotnica in eastern Slovenia. It lies immediately east of Oplotnica itself. The area is part of the traditional region of Styria. The municipality is now included in the Drava Statistical Region.

A church on Lačna gora hill northwest of the settlement is dedicated to Saints Hermagoras and Fortunatus and belongs to the parish of Čadram-Oplotnica. It dates to the 14th century with 17th-century restyling.
