= Korita, Trebnje =

Korita
- Location in Slovenia
- Coordinates: 45°51′46.97″N 14°59′10.35″E
- Country: Slovenia
- Traditional region: Lower Carniola
- Statistical region: Southeast Slovenia
- Municipality: Trebnje

Area
  - Total: 3.34 km^{2} (1.29 sq mi)
- Elevation: 231.7 m (760 ft)

Population (2002)
  - Total: 80

Korita (pronounced [kɔˈɾiːta]) is a village in the Municipality of Trebnje in eastern Slovenia. The area is part of the historical region of Lower Carniola. The municipality is now included in the Southeast Slovenia Statistical Region.

The local church is dedicated to Saint Peter and belongs to the Parish of Dobrnič. It was first mentioned in written documents dating to 1526. In the early 18th century it was remodelled in the Baroque style and extensively repaired in 1868.
