= Gorenje Kališče =

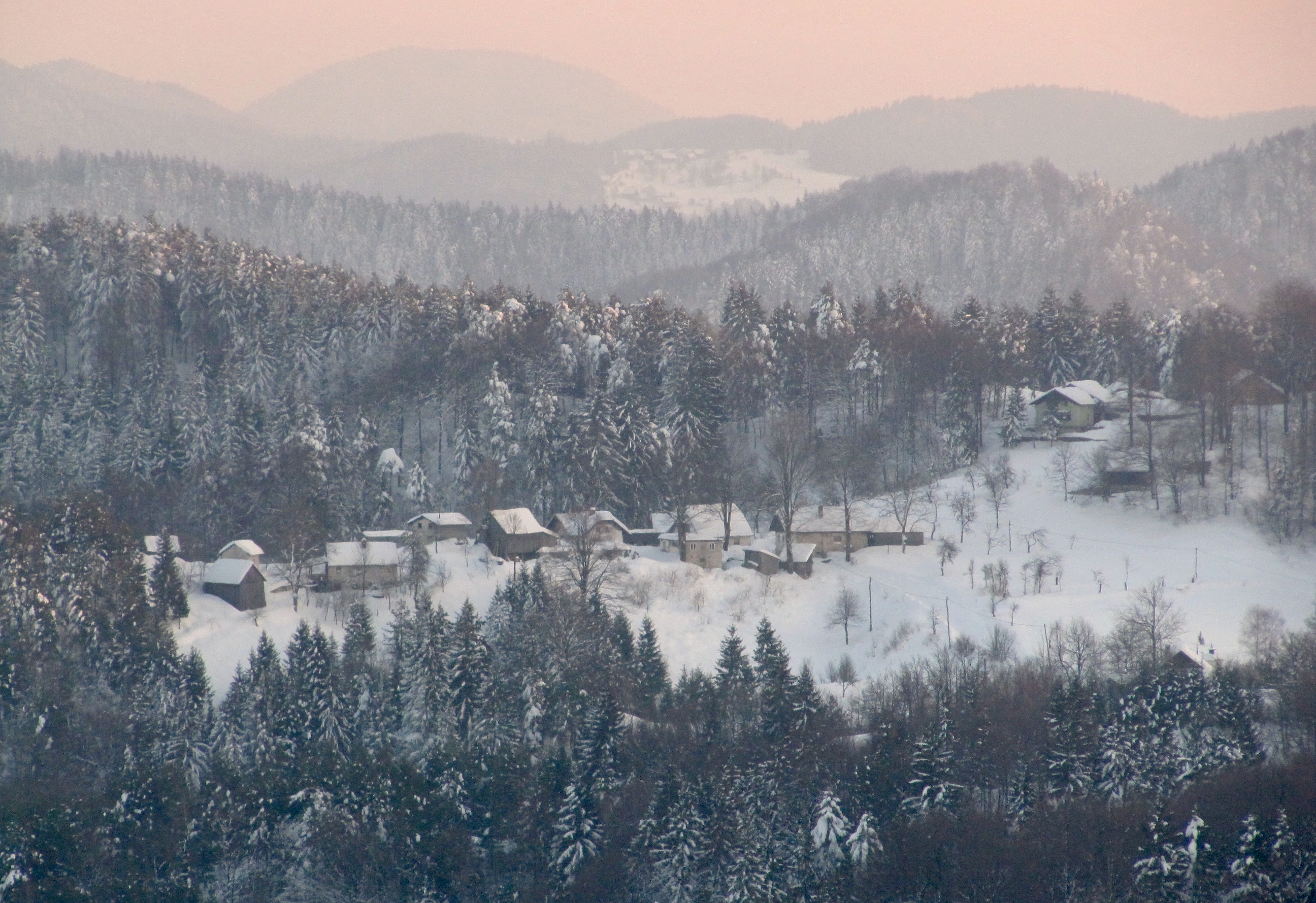

- Location in Slovenia
- Coordinates: 45°49′6.13″N 14°34′44.59″E
- Country: Slovenia
- Traditional region: Lower Carniola
- Statistical region: Central Slovenia
- Municipality: Velike Lašče

Area
  - Total: 1.42 km^{2} (0.55 sq mi)
- Elevation: 762.4 m (2,501 ft)

Population (2002)
  - Total: 6
- Postal code: 1314

Gorenje Kališče (pronounced [ɡɔˈɾeːnjɛ kaˈliːʃtʃɛ]; in older sources also Gorenje Kališe, German: Oberkalische) is a settlement in the Municipality of Velike Lašče in central Slovenia. The area is part of the traditional region of Lower Carniola and is now included in the Central Slovenia Statistical Region.
