= Klopce, Žužemberk =

Klopce
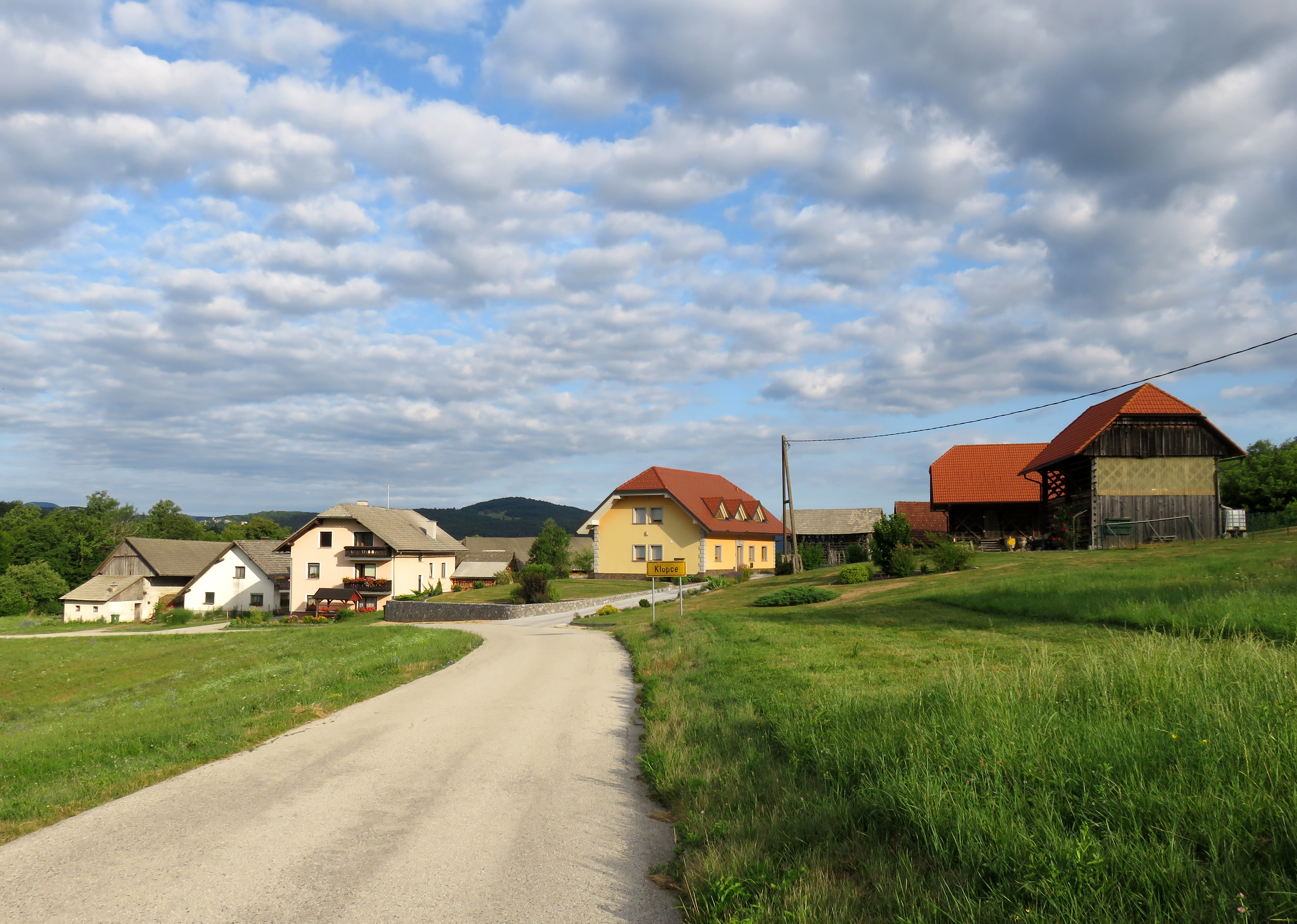

- Location in Slovenia
- Coordinates: 45°46′55.71″N 14°56′18.65″E
- Country: Slovenia
- Traditional region: Lower Carniola
- Statistical region: Southeast Slovenia
- Municipality: Žužemberk

Area
  - Total: 3.88 km^{2} (1.50 sq mi)
- Elevation: 402.7 m (1,321 ft)

Population (2002)
  - Total: 6

Klopce (pronounced [ˈkloːptsɛ]) is a small settlement in the Municipality of Žužemberk in southeastern Slovenia. It lies just off the regional road leading south from Dvor towards Kočevje in the historical region of Lower Carniola. The municipality is now included in the Southeast Slovenia Statistical Region.
