= Krtina, Trebnje =

Krtina
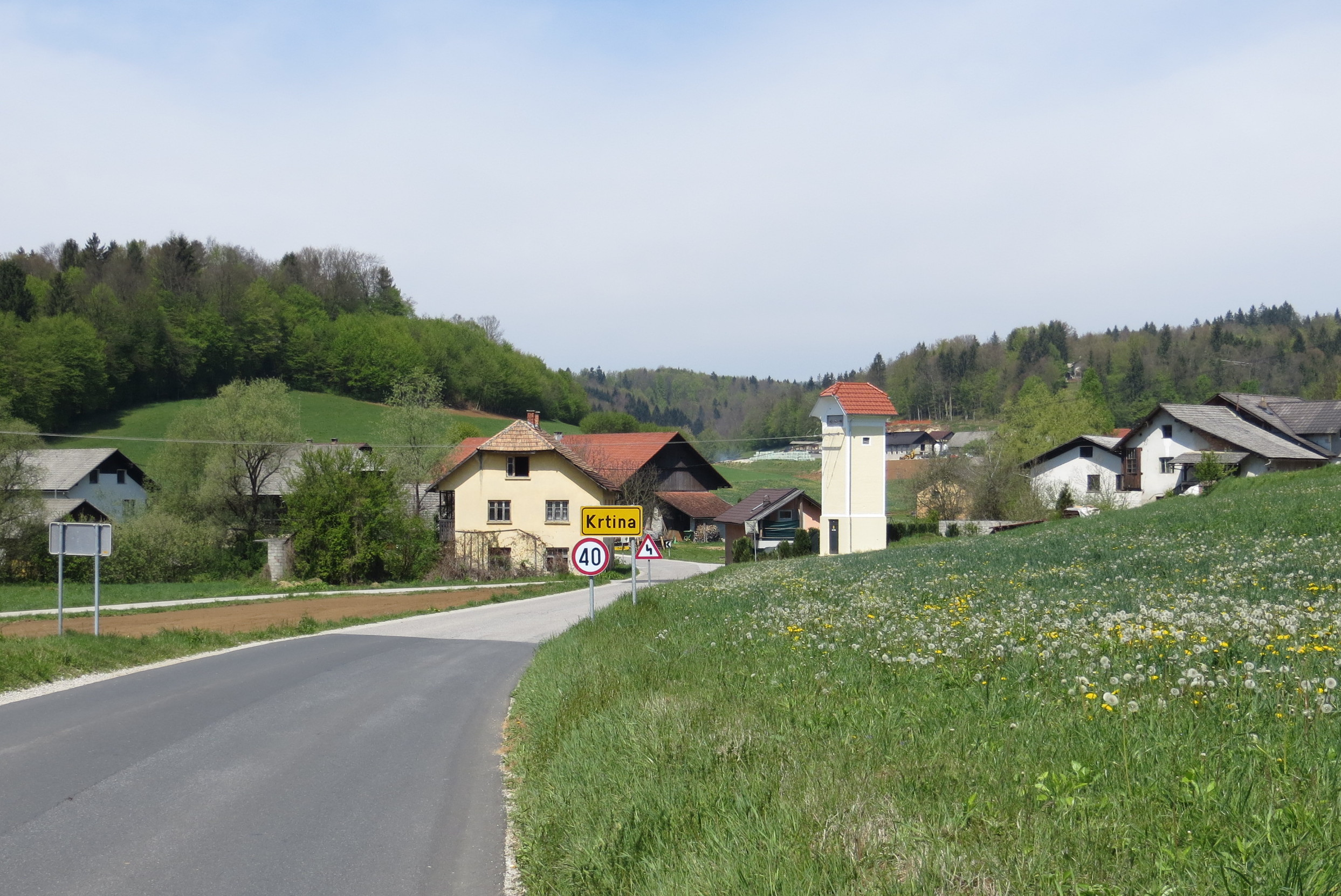

- Location in Slovenia
- Coordinates: 45°56′26.82″N 14°57′21.18″E
- Country: Slovenia
- Traditional region: Lower Carniola
- Statistical region: Southeast Slovenia
- Municipality: Trebnje

Area
  - Total: 0.12 km^{2} (0.046 sq mi)
- Elevation: 288.2 m (946 ft)

Population (2002)
  - Total: 31

Krtina (pronounced [kəɾˈtiːna]) is a small settlement in the Municipality of Trebnje in eastern Slovenia. It lies on the left bank of the Temenica River east of Šentlovrenc on the regional road to Trebnje. The area is part of the historical region of Lower Carniola. The municipality is now included in the Southeast Slovenia Statistical Region.
