= Moravče, Slovenia =

Moravče
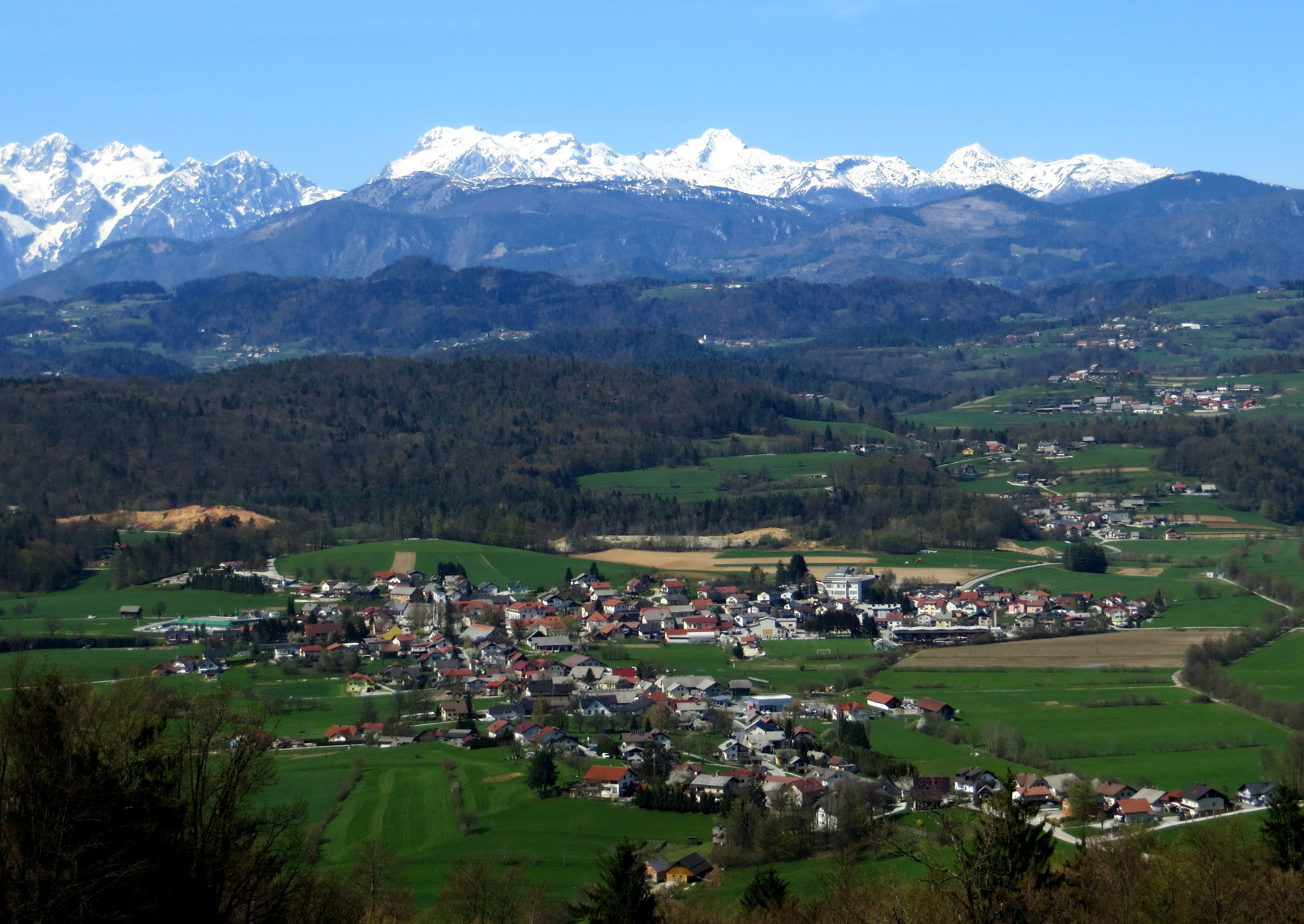

- Location in Slovenia
- Coordinates: 46°08′8″N 14°44′38″E
- Country: Slovenia
- Traditional region: Upper Carniola
- Statistical region: Central Slovenia
- Municipality: Moravče

Area
  - Total: 1.81 km^{2} (0.70 sq mi)
- Elevation: 380.3 m (1,248 ft)

Population (2021)
  - Total: 957
- Postal code: 1251

Moravče (pronounced [mɔˈɾaːu̯tʃɛ]; German: Moräutsch) is a settlement in the Municipality of Moravče in central Slovenia. It is the seat of the municipality. The area is part of the traditional region of Upper Carniola. The village is home to about 957 people. It includes the hamlet of Trzen (German: Tersen).

== Name ==
Moravče was attested in written sources in 1232 as Morawitz (and as Morauz in 1286 and Moraucz in 1301). The name is probably derived from a clipped noun phrase, Moravьče (selo); literally, 'Moravьcь's (village)'. It thus refers to an early inhabitant of the place. Locally, the settlement is also known as Maravče. In the past the German name was Moräutsch.

== History ==
Moravče is an old religious center and was already made a parish in the 12th century. The settlement is located in a wet, low-lying area, and the first settlement at the site was where the cemetery is currently located and was known as Moravče na Griču 'Moravče on the hill'. Freeholders and lesser nobility made up a large part of the population, and they also bore responsibility for safeguarding the area. Cloth-making and other crafts flourished during the feudal era.

At the beginning of the 17th century, various radical sects were active in the area, led by the smith Gašper Goleš and his son Luka. Until the road to Vienna through the Black Valley (Slovene: Črni graben) was built at the beginning of the 18th century, Moravče was on the freight route for transporting mercury from Idrija to Styria. Moravče was granted market rights by Maria Theresa in the 18th century; this especially applied to collecting vendors' fees at fairs, which were held at Martinmas and Saint Matthias' Day. A school was founded in Moravče in 1823, and a schoolhouse was built in 1865. A fire station was built in 1907. The tradition of a night watchman that called the hours was retained until 1933.

During the Second World War, the Partisans attacked the police station on 19 April 1942 and looted the dairy. On 16 March 1943 the Partisans destroyed the post office, savings bank, and municipal office. The schoolhouse was burned in 1943 (and later rebuilt in 1946). The Partisans took control of Moravče on 19 March 1944, but German forces aided by Russian Liberation Army troops and Slovene Home Guard forces retook control of the town in August 1944 during a battle in which the rectory and several houses were burned. Moravče came under aerial bombardment on 24 December 1944.

A public library was established in 1954. A new school was built in Moravče in 1967 and was named after Jurij Vega.

== Moravče Castle ==
Moravče Castle stood on a rise above the village, but no trace of it is left today. It was built in 1550. During the Reformation, the lords of Moravče Castle were Lutheran, and the Counter-Reformation committee took steps against them in 1642.

== Church ==
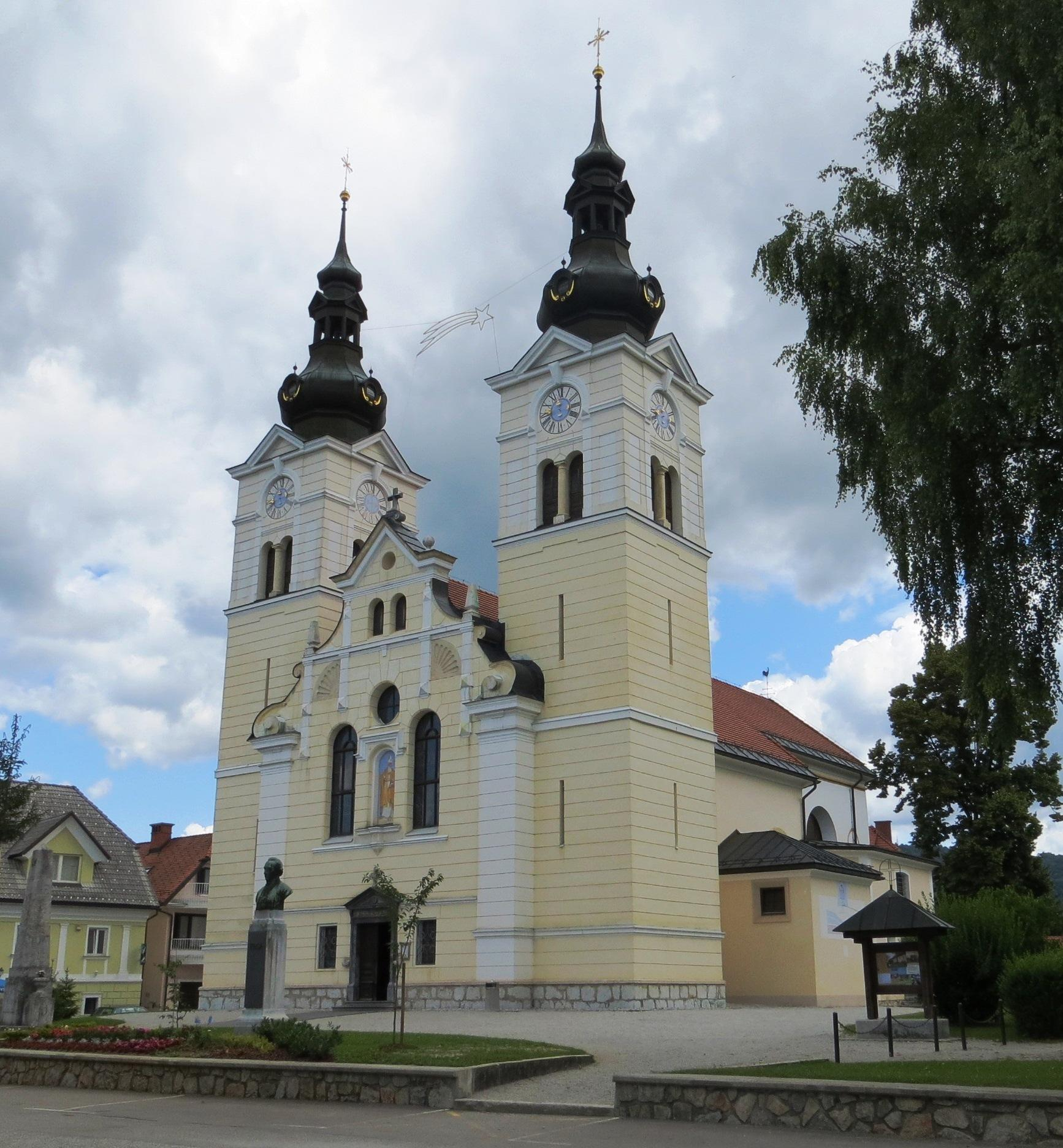
Saint Martin's Church

The parish church in the settlement is dedicated to Saint Martin and belongs to the Roman Catholic Archdiocese of Ljubljana. It is a Late Gothic building that was extended and restyled in the Baroque in 1740. Its 19th-century façade has two belfries. Saint Martin's church was first mentioned in 1232 and was probably a small wooden structure. The current structure was built in 1895 and was designed by Raimund Jeblinger (1853–1937). The main altar features Saint Martin kneeling on a throne accompanied by two angels.

== Other cultural heritage ==
In addition to Saint Martin's Church, other cultural heritage items are registered in Moravče.

- A chapel-shrine dedicated to Our Lady of Good Counsel stands in the western part of Moravče, near the church and south of the rectory. It dates from 1759 and is a squat structure with an onion-dome roof. It was originally an open chapel-shrine, but the side openings were filled in 1891. Its paintings also date from 1891 and were restored in 1987.
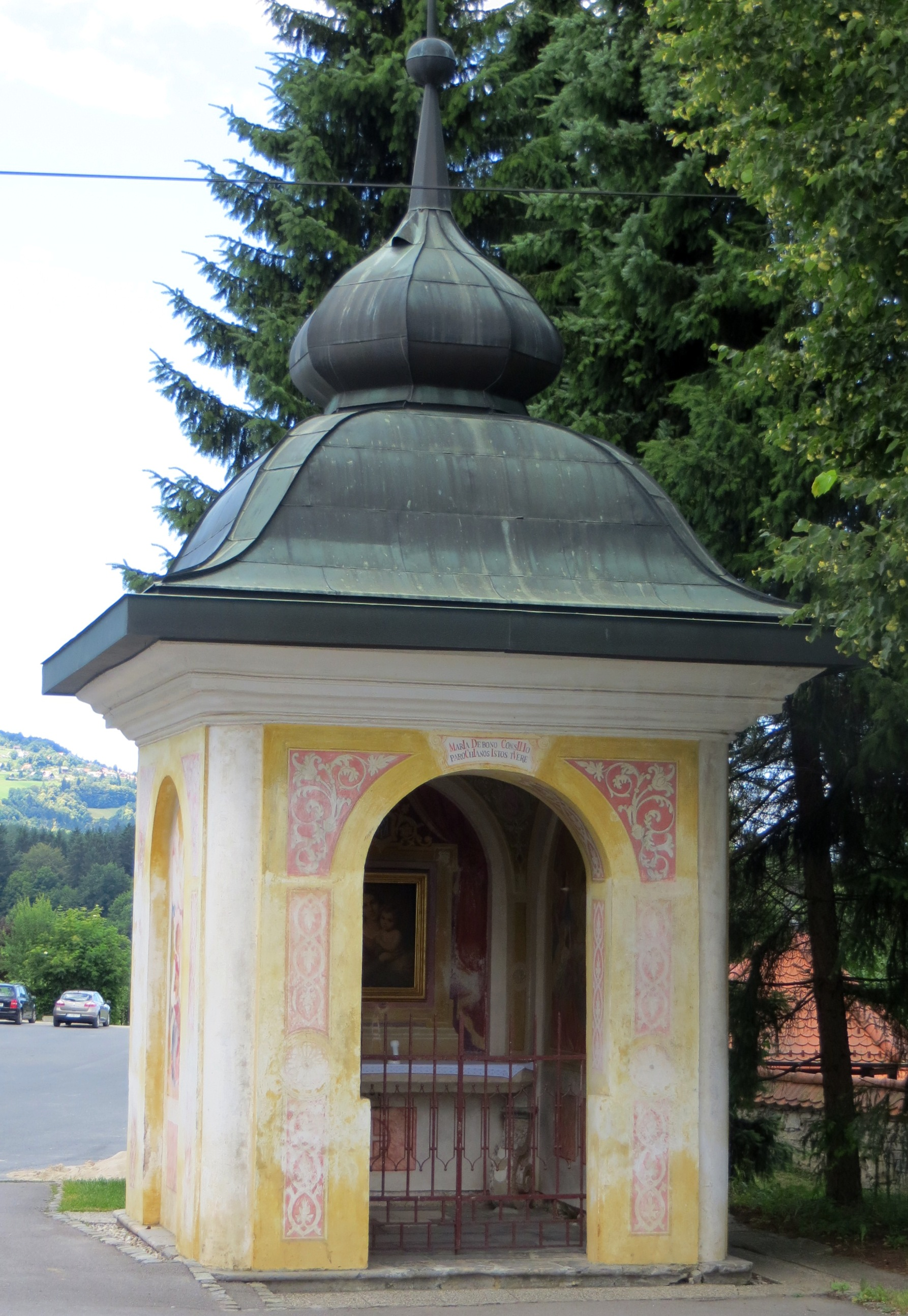
Our Lady of Good Counsel chapel-shrine

== Notable people ==
Notable people that were born or lived in Moravče include:

- Danilo Cerar (1896–1980), composer
- Jurij Vega (1754–1802), mathematician
- Fran Detela (1850–1926), writer and playwright
- Radovan Klopčič (1898–1992), illustrator
- Jože Lavrič (1903–1973), economist, lawyer, and translator
- Anton Oliban (1824–1860), poet and translator
- Anton Rožič (ca. 1787–?), historical writer
- Janko Toman (1863–1945), school director
