= Kal, Ivančna Gorica =

Kal
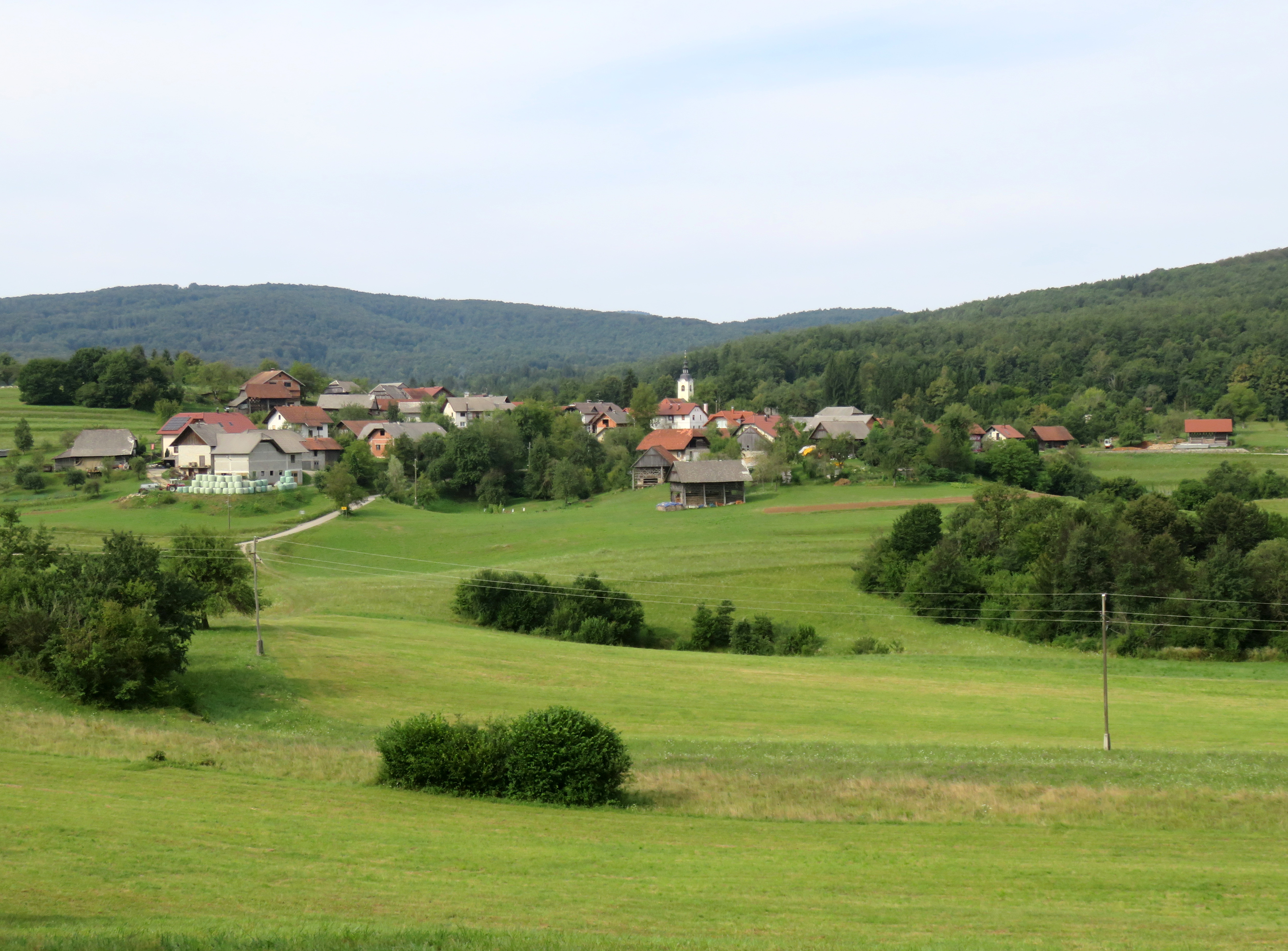

- Location in Slovenia
- Coordinates: 45°49′54.34″N 14°48′35.08″E
- Country: Slovenia
- Traditional region: Lower Carniola
- Statistical region: Central Slovenia
- Municipality: Ivančna Gorica

Area
  - Total: 5.39 km^{2} (2.08 sq mi)
- Elevation: 403.1 m (1,323 ft)

Population (2002)
  - Total: 107

Kal (pronounced [ˈkaːu̯]) is a small village just west of Ambrus in the Municipality of Ivančna Gorica in central Slovenia. The area is part of the historical region of Lower Carniola. The municipality is now included in the Central Slovenia Statistical Region.

== Church ==
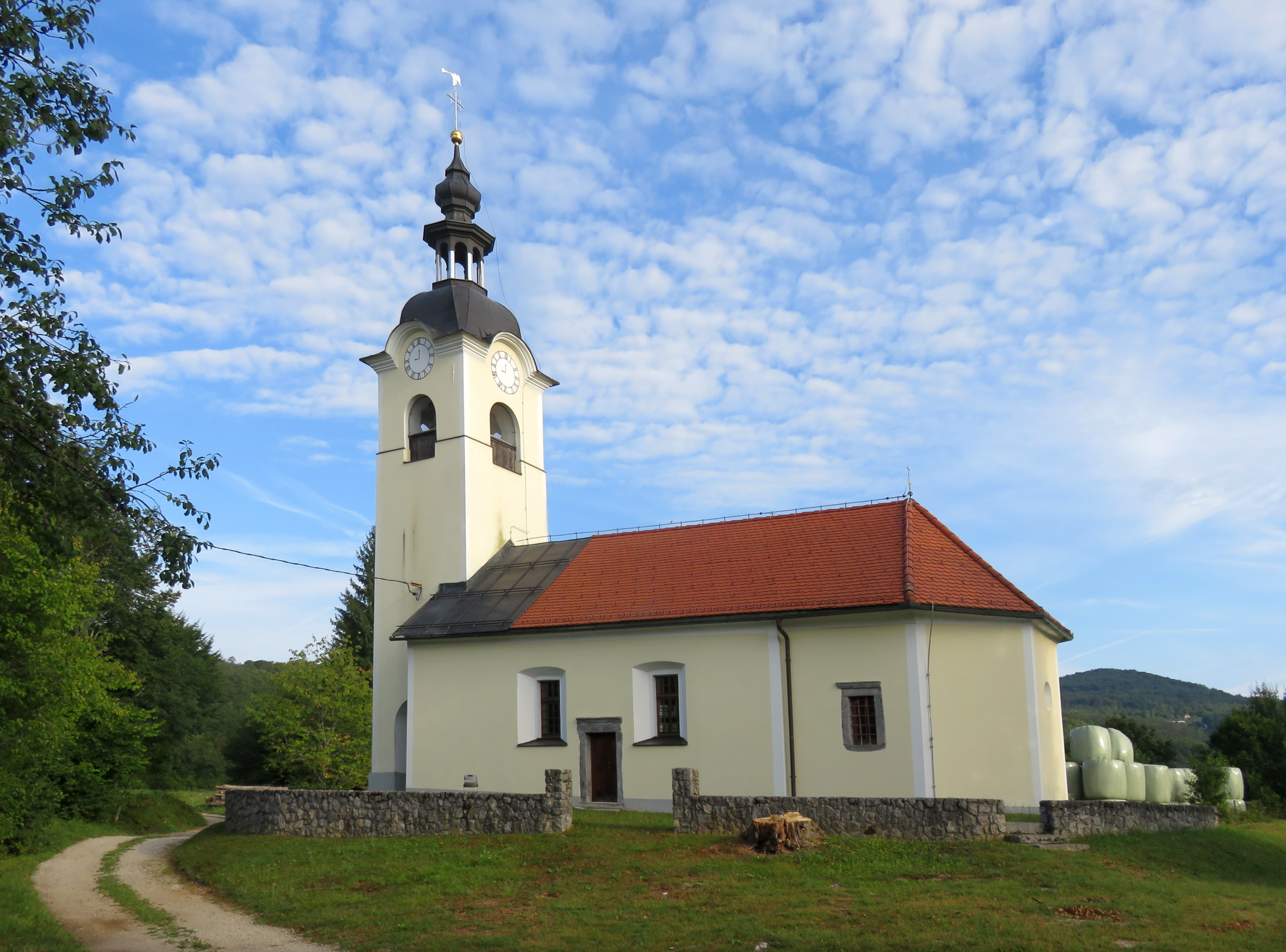
Saint Lucy's Church

The local church is dedicated to Saint Lucy and belongs to the Parish of Ambrus. It was originally built in the 17th century, but largely rebuilt in 1836. The church was badly damaged by Partisan forces in 1943.
