= Krtina, Domžale =

Krtina
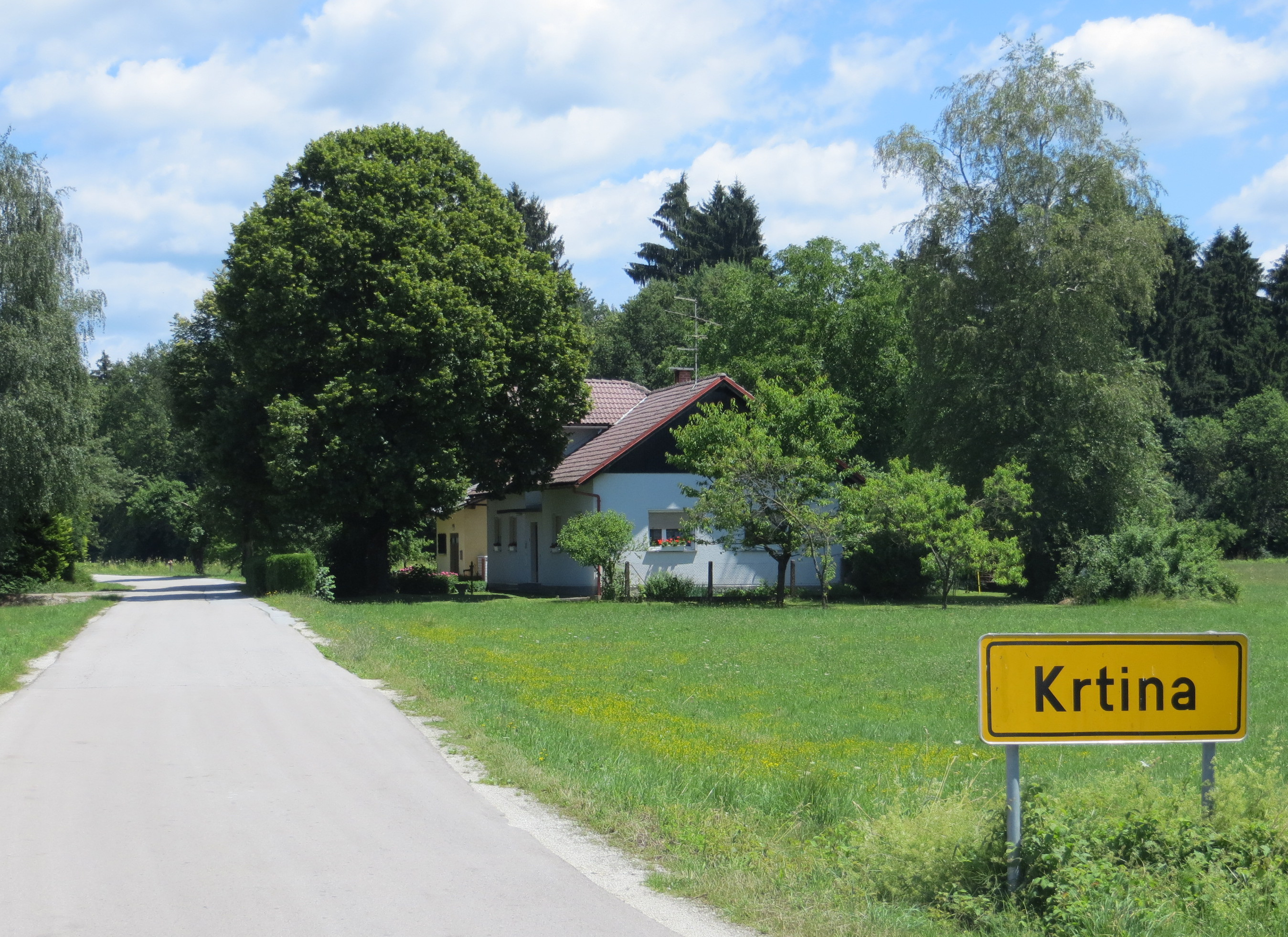

- Location in Slovenia
- Coordinates: 46°8′5.15″N 14°39′6.36″E
- Country: Slovenia
- Traditional region: Upper Carniola
- Statistical region: Central Slovenia
- Municipality: Domžale
- Elevation: 310.4 m (1,018 ft)

Population (2023)
  - Total: 908

Krtina (pronounced [kəɾˈtiːna]; German: Kertina) is a village in the Municipality of Domžale in the Upper Carniola region of Slovenia.

The settlement used to be part of the Krumperk lordship. The local church is dedicated to Saint Leonard.
