= Oplotnica =

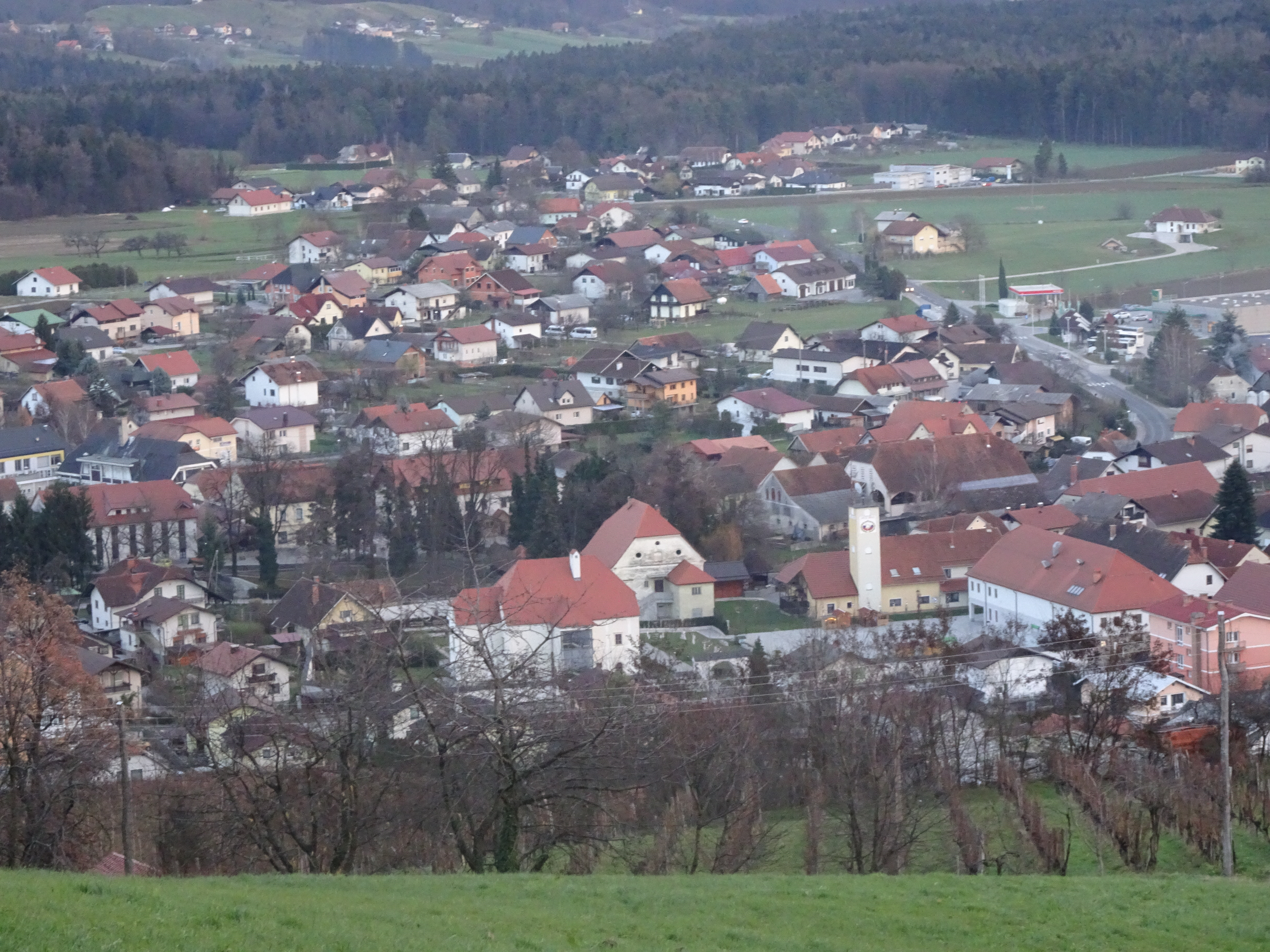

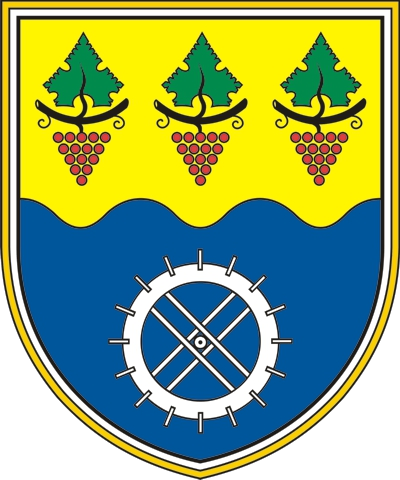
- Coat of arms

- Location in Slovenia
- Coordinates: 46°23′09.70″N 15°26′44.70″E
- Country: Slovenia
- Traditional region: Styria
- Statistical region: Drava
- Municipality: Oplotnica

Area
  - Total: 3.60 km^{2} (1.39 sq mi)
- Elevation: 379.0 m (1,243.4 ft)

Population (2010)
  - Total: 1,420

Oplotnica (pronounced [ɔˈploːtnitsa]; German: Oplotnitz) is a small town in eastern Slovenia. It is the seat of the Municipality of Oplotnica. It lies on the Oplotniščica River, a left tributary of the Dravinja River, to the north of Slovenske Konjice. The area is part of the traditional region of Styria and formerly part of Austria-Hungary. The municipality is now included in the Drava Statistical Region.

== Church ==
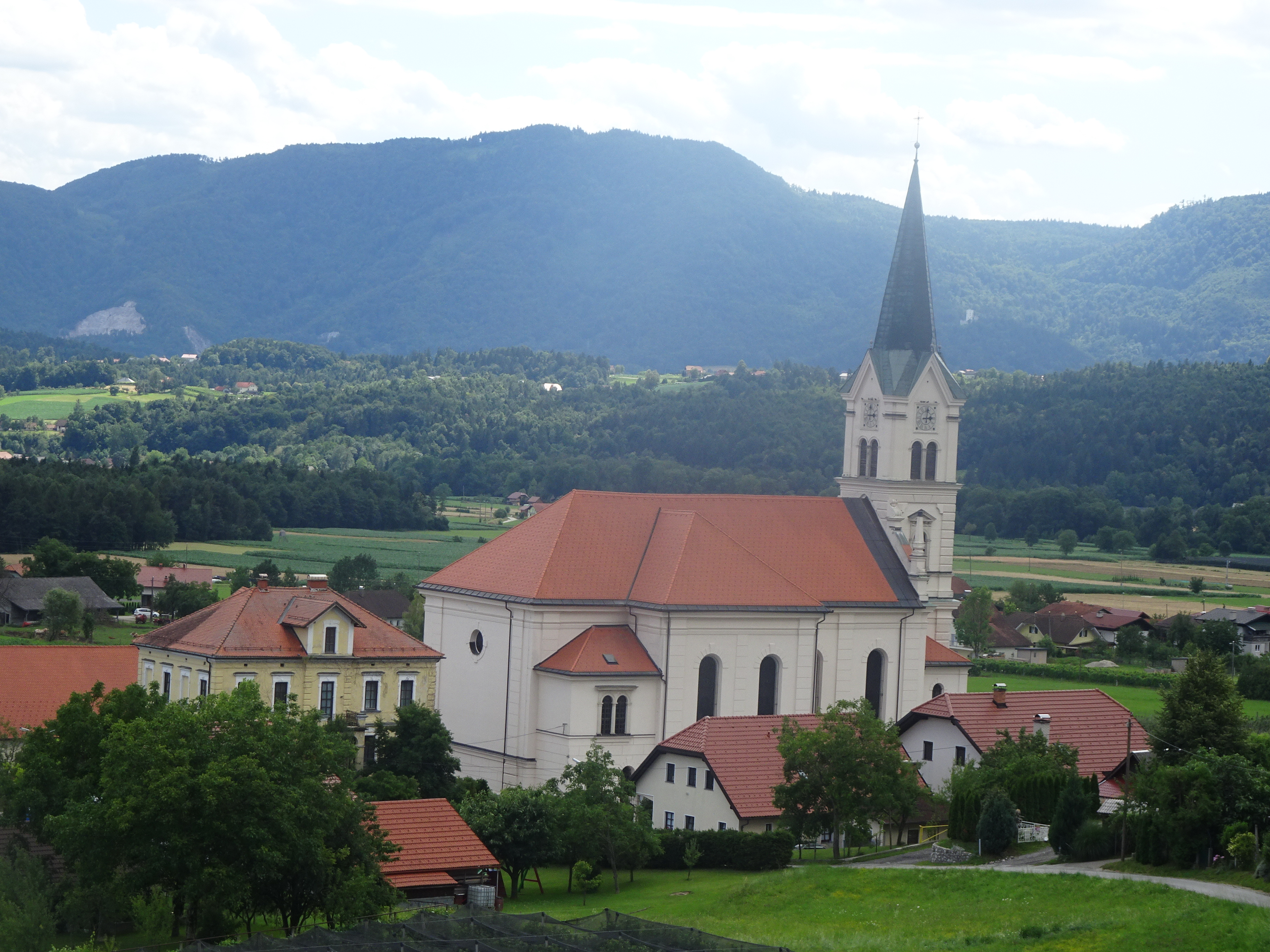
John the Baptist Church

The parish church stands on the eastern edge of the town, next to the neighboring settlement of Čadram. It is dedicated to John the Baptist and belongs to the Roman Catholic Archdiocese of Maribor. It was built between 1895 and 1899.
