= Dolenje =

Dolenje may refer to:

- Dolegna del Collio, or Dolenje in Slovene, a commune of Italy
- Dolenje, Ajdovščina, a settlement in the Municipality of Ajdovščina, Slovenia
- Dolenje, Domžale, a settlement in the Municipality of Domžale, Slovenia
- Dolenje, Sežana, a settlement in the Municipality of Sežana, Slovenia
- Dolenje pri Jelšanah, a settlement in Municipality of Ilirska Bistrica, Slovenia
