= Dobovlje =

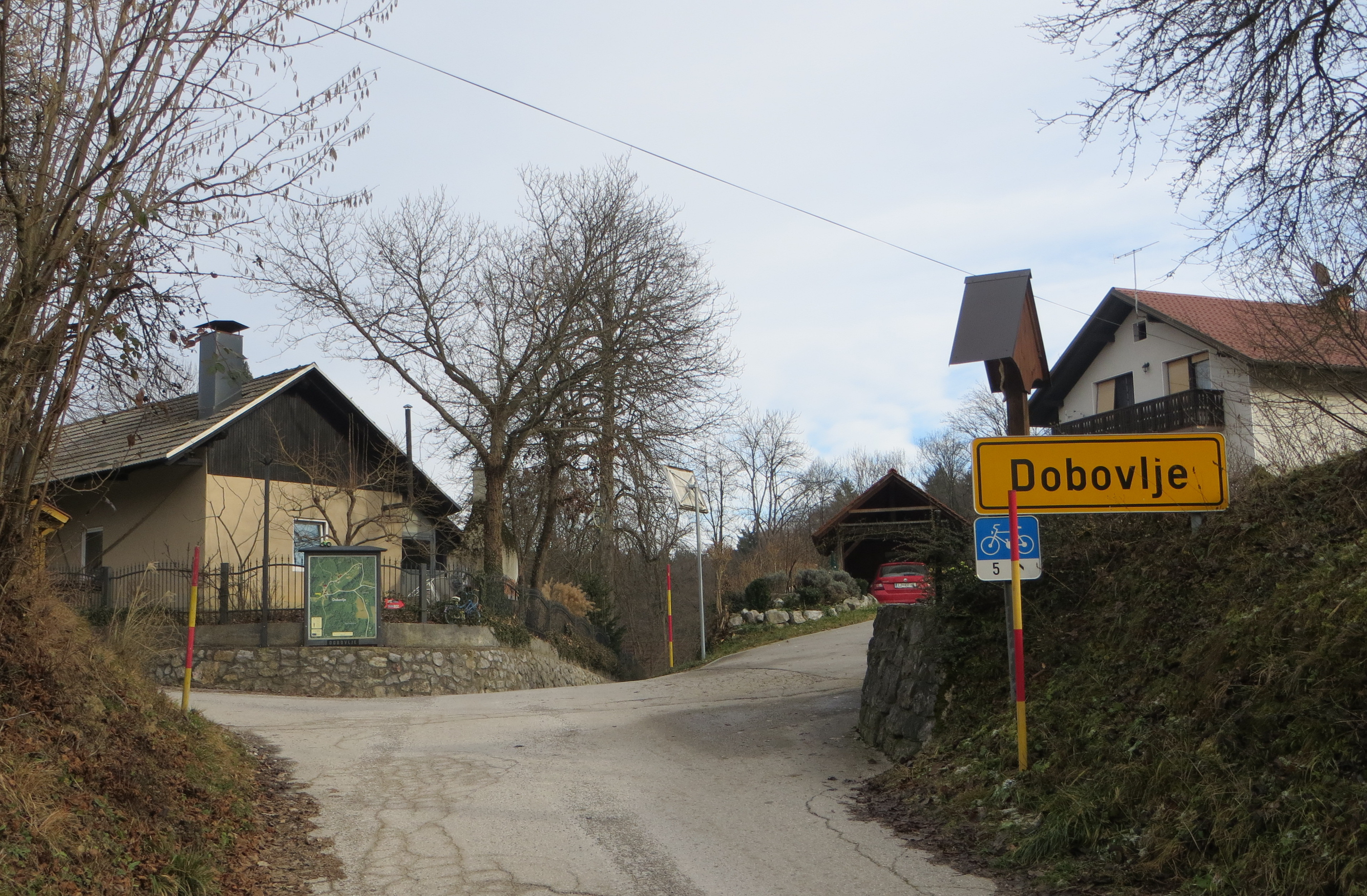

- Location in Slovenia
- Coordinates: 46°7′30.12″N 14°39′7.36″E
- Country: Slovenia
- Traditional region: Upper Carniola
- Statistical region: Central Slovenia
- Municipality: Domžale
- Elevation: 431.5 m (1,416 ft)

Population (2020)
  - Total: 38

Dobovlje (pronounced [dɔˈboːu̯lje]; sometimes Dobovje) is a small settlement in the Municipality of Domžale in the Upper Carniola region of Slovenia.

== History ==
Dobovlje was administratively separated from Brdo in 1992, when it was made a separate settlement. Additional territory was transferred to the settlement from Brdo in 2004.
