= Škocjan, Domžale =

Škocjan
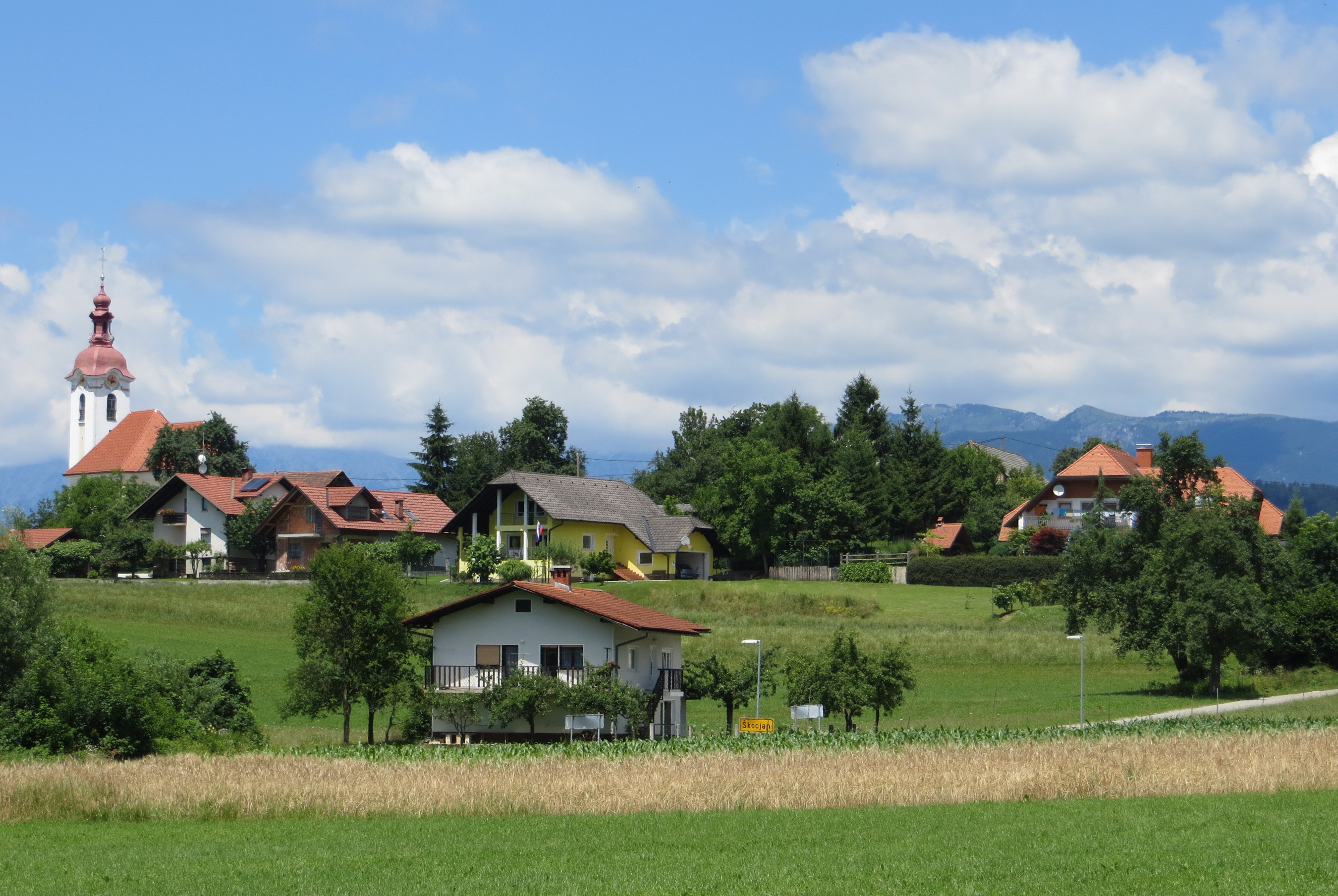

- Location in Slovenia
- Coordinates: 46°8′49.87″N 14°40′24.68″E
- Country: Slovenia
- Traditional region: Upper Carniola
- Statistical region: Central Slovenia
- Municipality: Domžale

Area
  - Total: 0.45 km^{2} (0.17 sq mi)
- Elevation: 325.7 m (1,069 ft)

Population (2020)
  - Total: 110
  - Density: 240/km^{2} (630/sq mi)

Škocjan (pronounced [ˈʃkɔːtsjan]; in older sources also Škocijan, German: Sankt Kanzian) is small settlement east of Domžale in the Upper Carniola region of Slovenia.

== Church ==
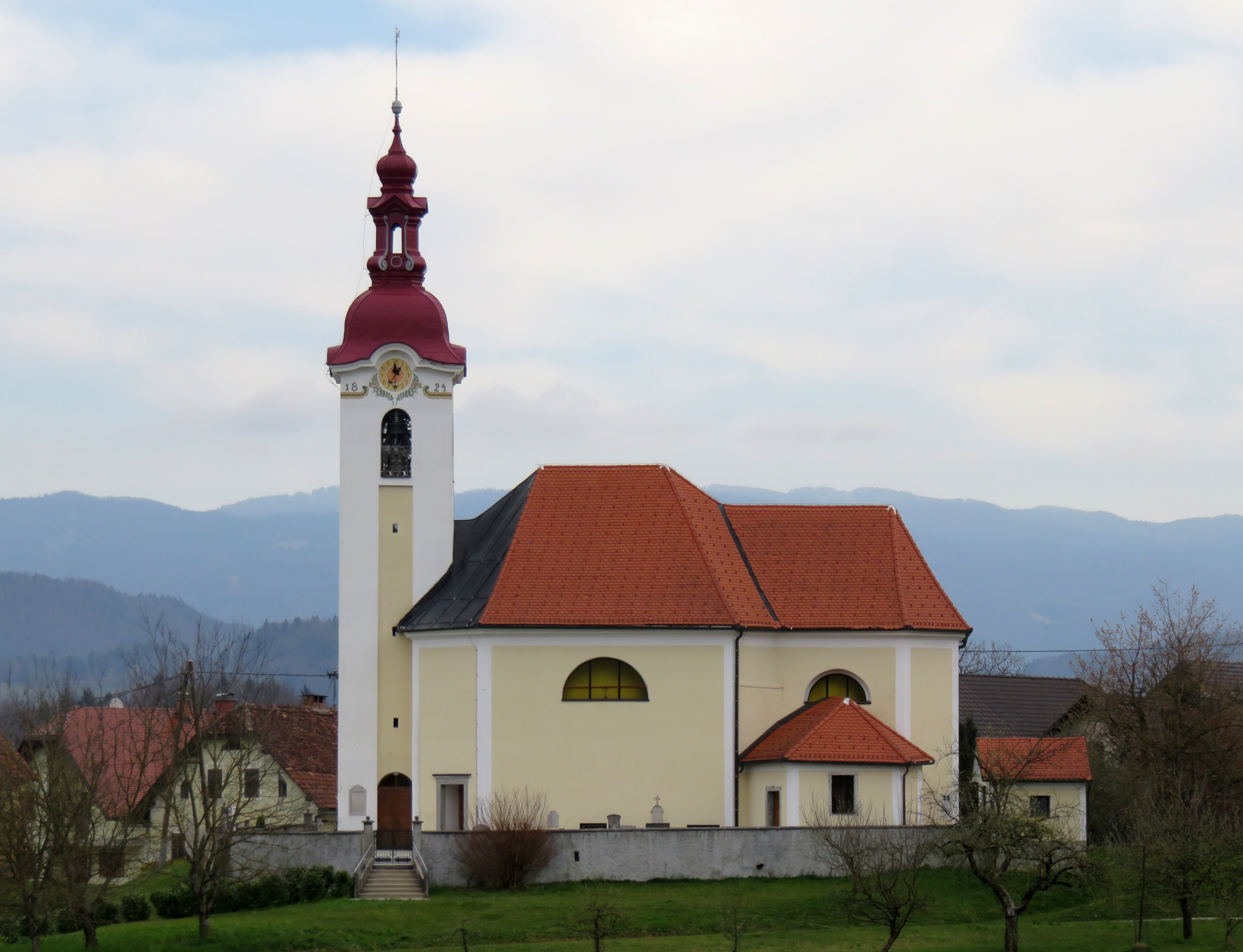
Saint Cantius's Church

The local church is dedicated to Saint Cantius.
