= Češenik =

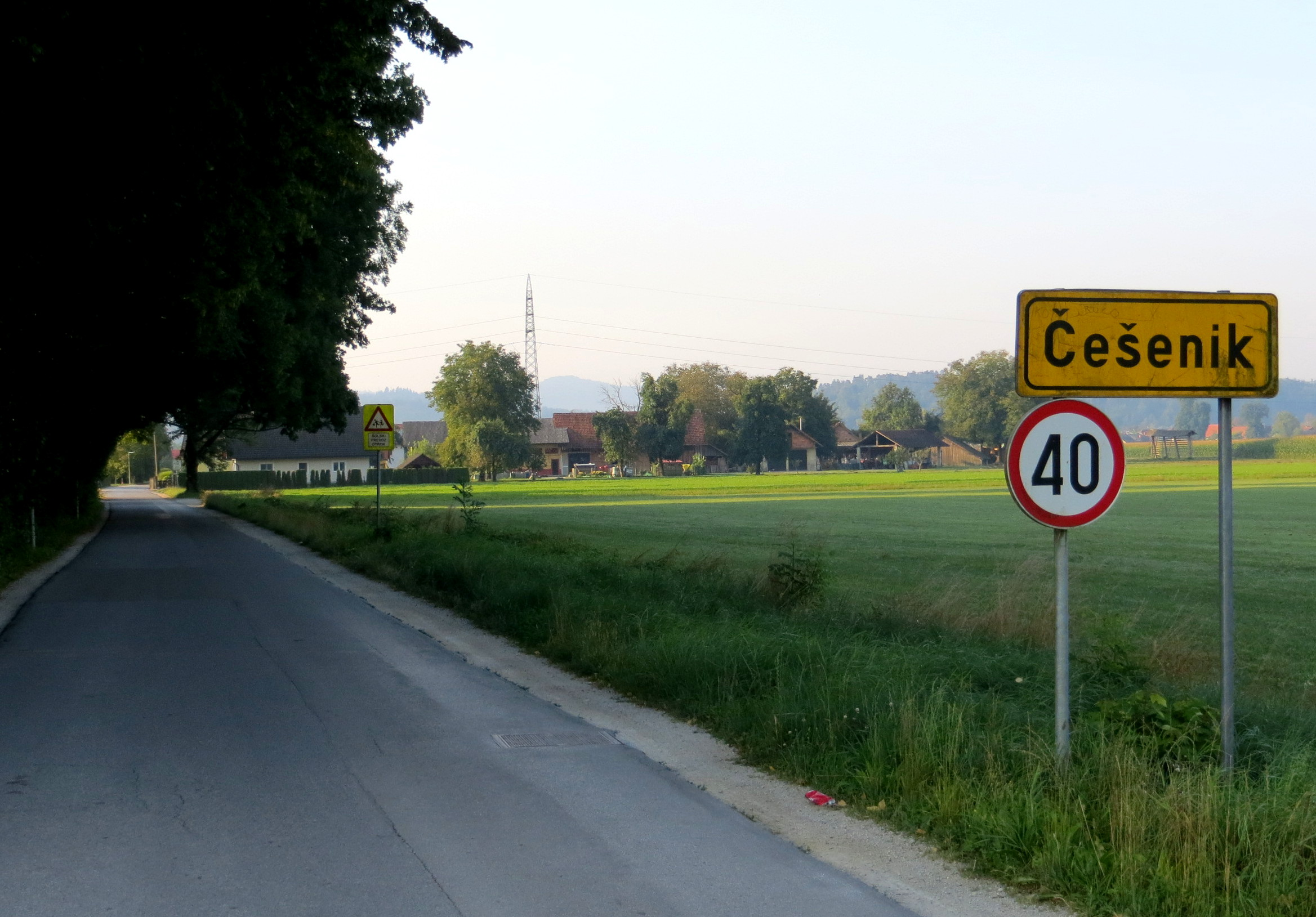

- Location in Slovenia
- Coordinates: 46°9′36.02″N 14°37′40.8″E
- Country: Slovenia
- Traditional region: Upper Carniola
- Statistical region: Central Slovenia
- Municipality: Domžale
- Elevation: 313.3 m (1,028 ft)

Population (2020)
  - Total: 151

Češenik (pronounced [tʃɛʃɛˈniːk]; in older sources and locally: Čemšenik, German: Scherenbüchel) is a settlement in the Municipality of Domžale in the Upper Carniola region of Slovenia.

== Češenik Manor ==
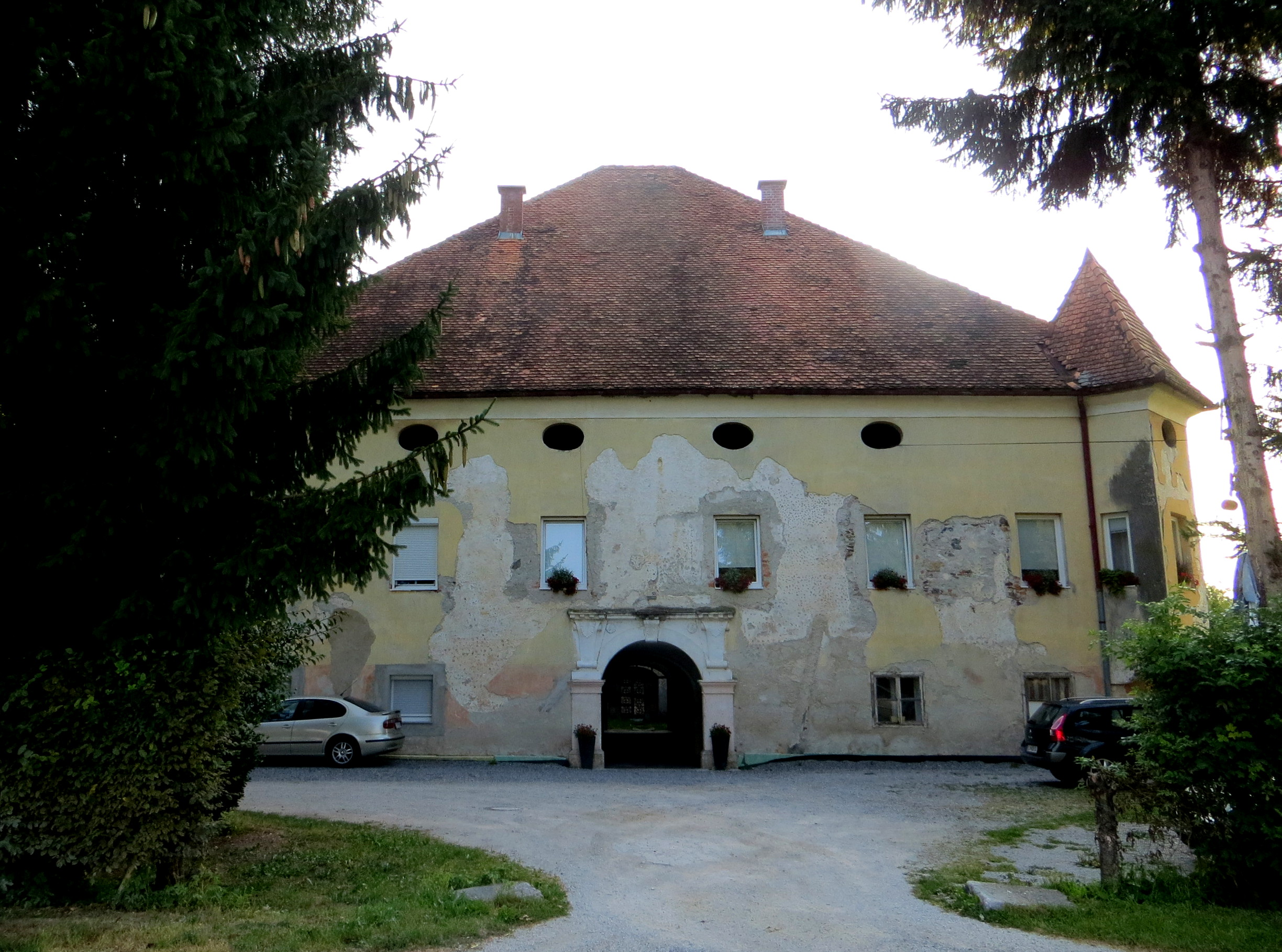
Češenik Manor

Češenik Manor (Slovene: dvorec Češenik or graščina Češenik; German: Scherenbüchel) stands at the north end of the settlement. It was built after 1581, when the previous structure burned down after a lightning strike. The manor was burned by the Partisans on March 16, 1944. The building was repaired after the war and converted into apartments.
