= Depala Vas =

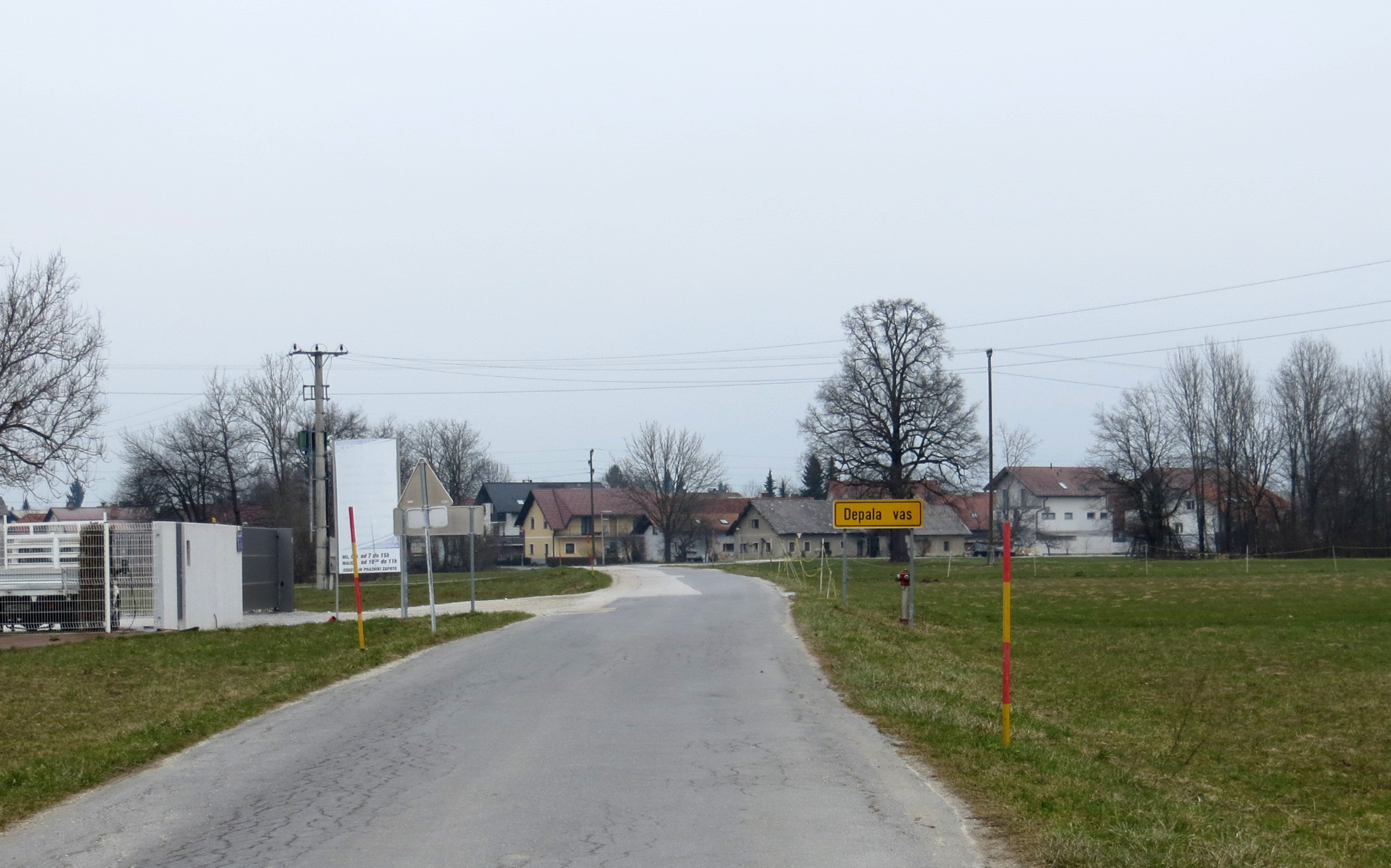

- Location in Slovenia
- Coordinates: 46°7′49.07″N 14°34′17.46″E
- Country: Slovenia
- Traditional region: Upper Carniola
- Statistical region: Central Slovenia
- Municipality: Domžale
- Elevation: 294.8 m (967 ft)

Population (2020)
  - Total: 506

Depala Vas (pronounced [ˈdeːpala ˈʋaːs]; Slovene: Depala vas, German: Depelsdorf) is a settlement in the Municipality of Domžale in the Upper Carniola region of Slovenia.

== Name ==
Depala Vas was first mentioned in 1309 under the German name Diepoltsdorf (and in 1539 under the Slovene name ex Depolia vas). The Slovene name Depala vas is derived from the Slavic personal name Depal (probably of German origin, derived from Dietpald or a similar name). The name therefore literally means 'Depal's village' and likely refers to an early inhabitant of the place. In the past the German name was Depelsdorf.
