= Žiče, Domžale =

Žiče
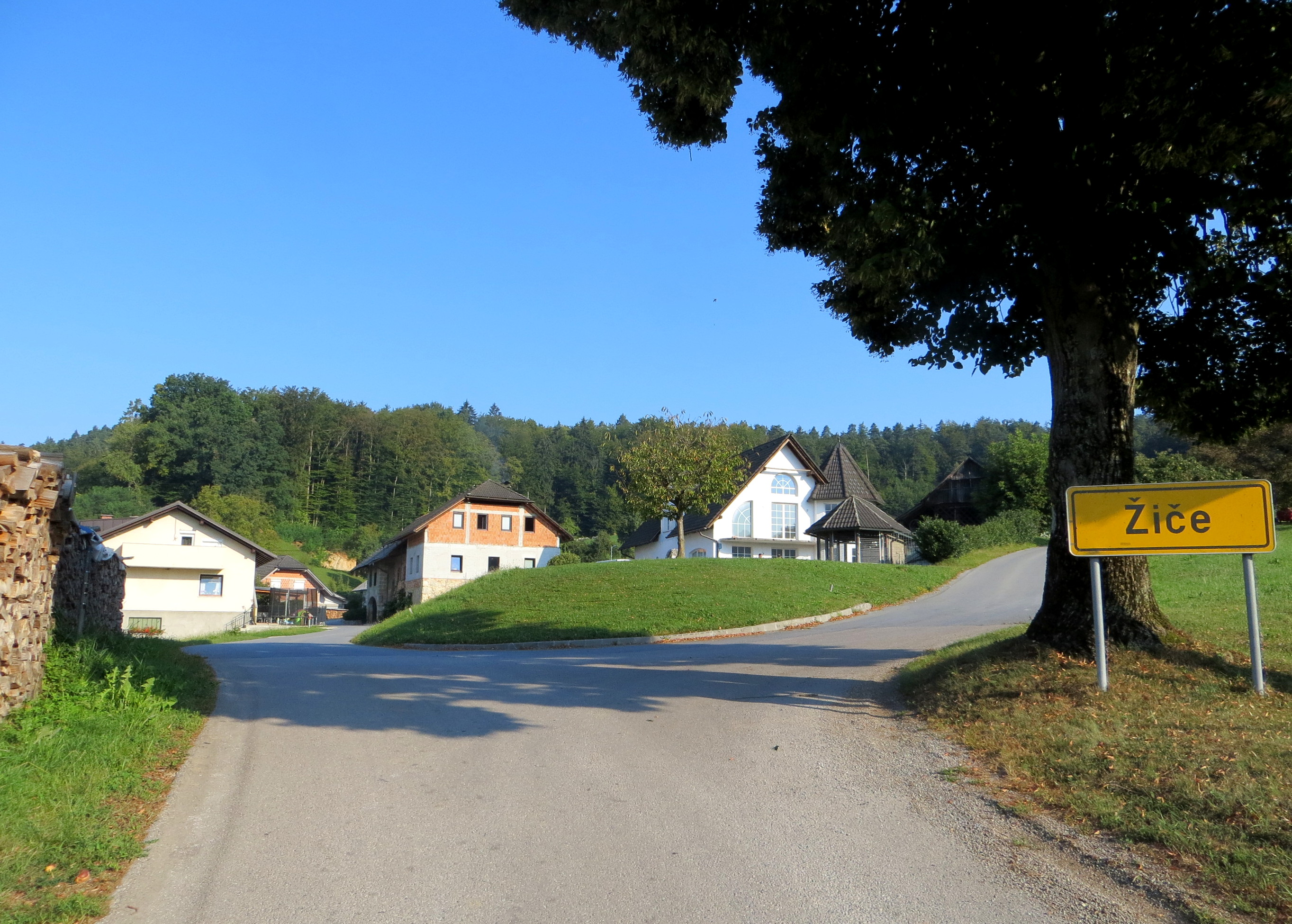

- Location in Slovenia
- Coordinates: 46°10′52.71″N 14°38′59.09″E
- Country: Slovenia
- Traditional region: Upper Carniola
- Statistical region: Central Slovenia
- Municipality: Domžale

Area
  - Total: 1.2 km^{2} (0.46 sq mi)
- Elevation: 367.5 m (1,206 ft)

Population (2020)
  - Total: 59
  - Density: 49/km^{2} (130/sq mi)

Žiče (pronounced [ˈʒiːtʃɛ]; German: Schitsche) is a small village east of Radomlje in the Municipality of Domžale in the Upper Carniola region of Slovenia.

== Name ==
Žiče was attested in written sources in 1341 as Seycz (and as Seitz in 1327 and Seytz in 1380). The name is derived from the plural demonym *Zitъčane or *Žiťane, based on the hypocorism *Žitъko or *Žitъ, referring to an early inhabitant of the place. In the past it was known as Schitsche in German.
