= Bišče =

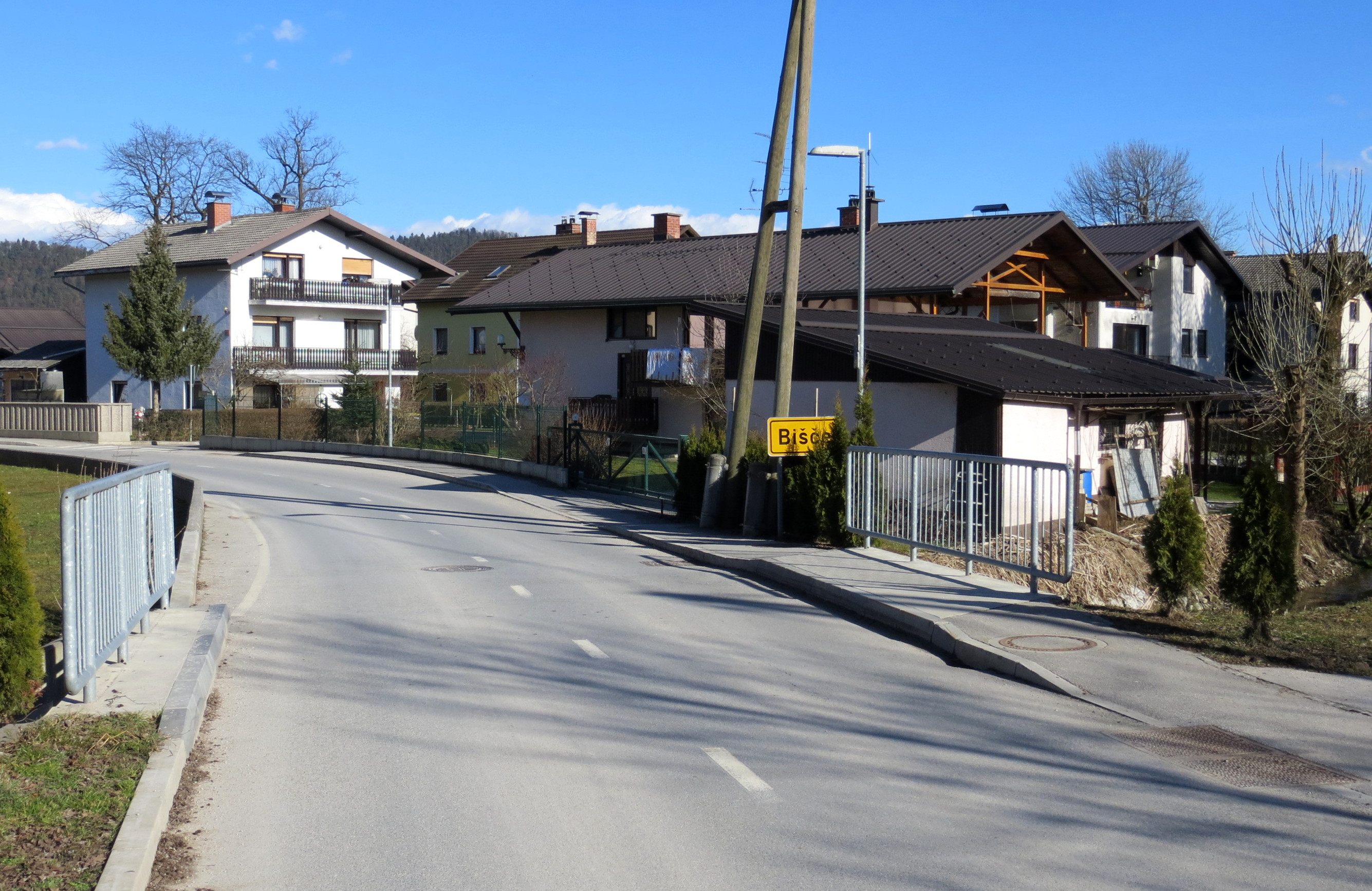

- Location in Slovenia
- Coordinates: 46°6′9.2″N 14°36′51.43″E
- Country: Slovenia
- Traditional region: Upper Carniola
- Statistical region: Central Slovenia
- Municipality: Domžale
- Elevation: 278.8 m (915 ft)

Population (2020)
  - Total: 246

Bišče (pronounced [ˈbiːʃtʃɛ]) is a settlement on the right bank of the Kamnik Bistrica River in the Municipality of Domžale in the Upper Carniola region of Slovenia.

== Name ==
Bišče was attested in written sources as Wittschicz in 1439 and Wischicz in 1444, among other spellings.
