= Nožice =

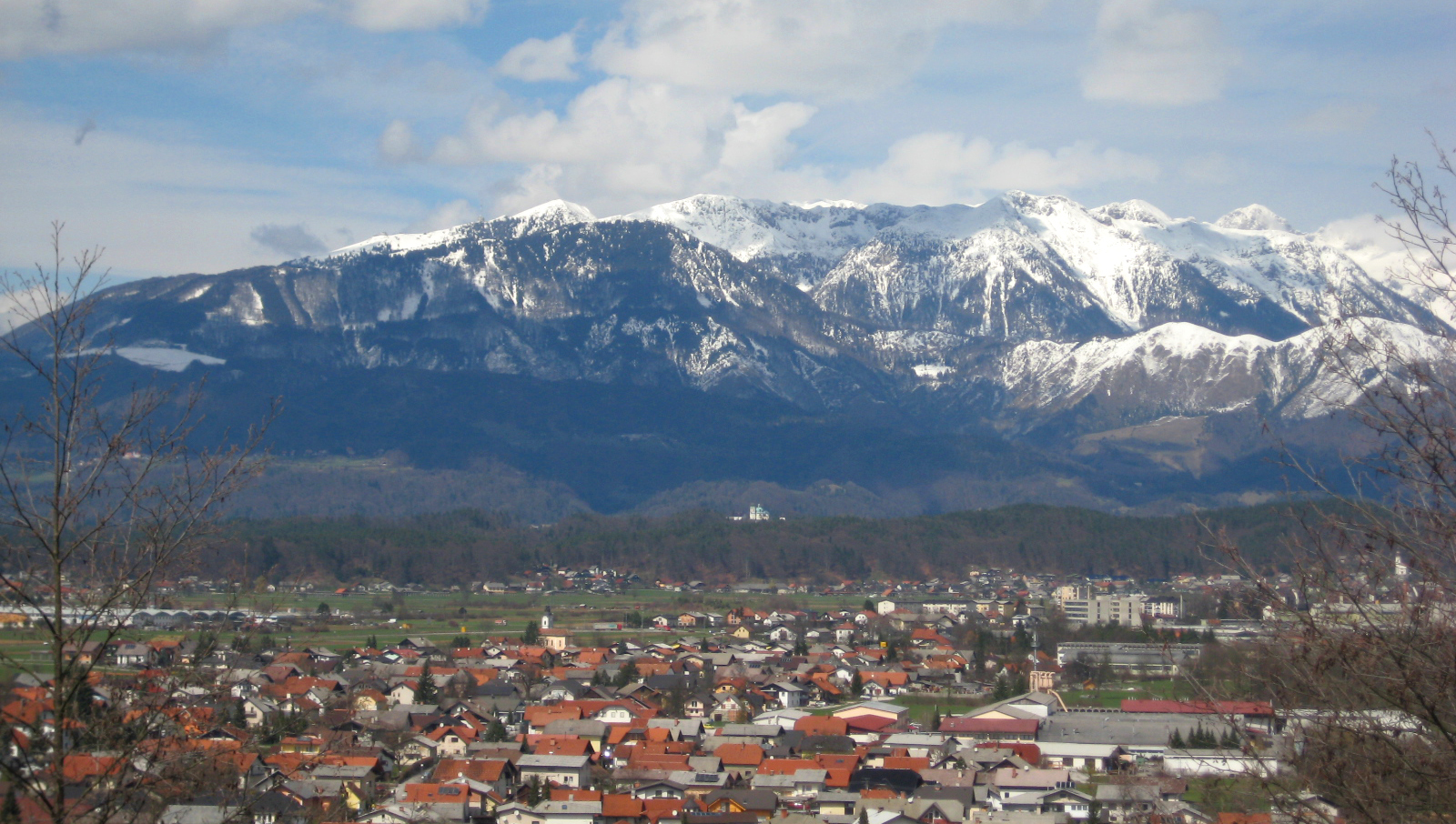

- Location in Slovenia
- Coordinates: 46°11′9.56″N 14°35′44.05″E
- Country: Slovenia
- Traditional region: Upper Carniola
- Statistical region: Central Slovenia
- Municipality: Domžale

Area
  - Total: 0.58 km^{2} (0.22 sq mi)
- Elevation: 340.4 m (1,117 ft)

Population (2020)
  - Total: 632
  - Density: 1,100/km^{2} (2,800/sq mi)

Nožice (pronounced [ˈnoːʒitsɛ]) is a settlement on the right bank of the Kamnik Bistrica River south of Kamnik in the Upper Carniola region of Slovenia. Administratively it belongs to the Municipality of Domžale.
