= Zalog pod Sveto Trojico =

Zalog pod Sveto Trojico Zalog pod Trojico (1955–1992)
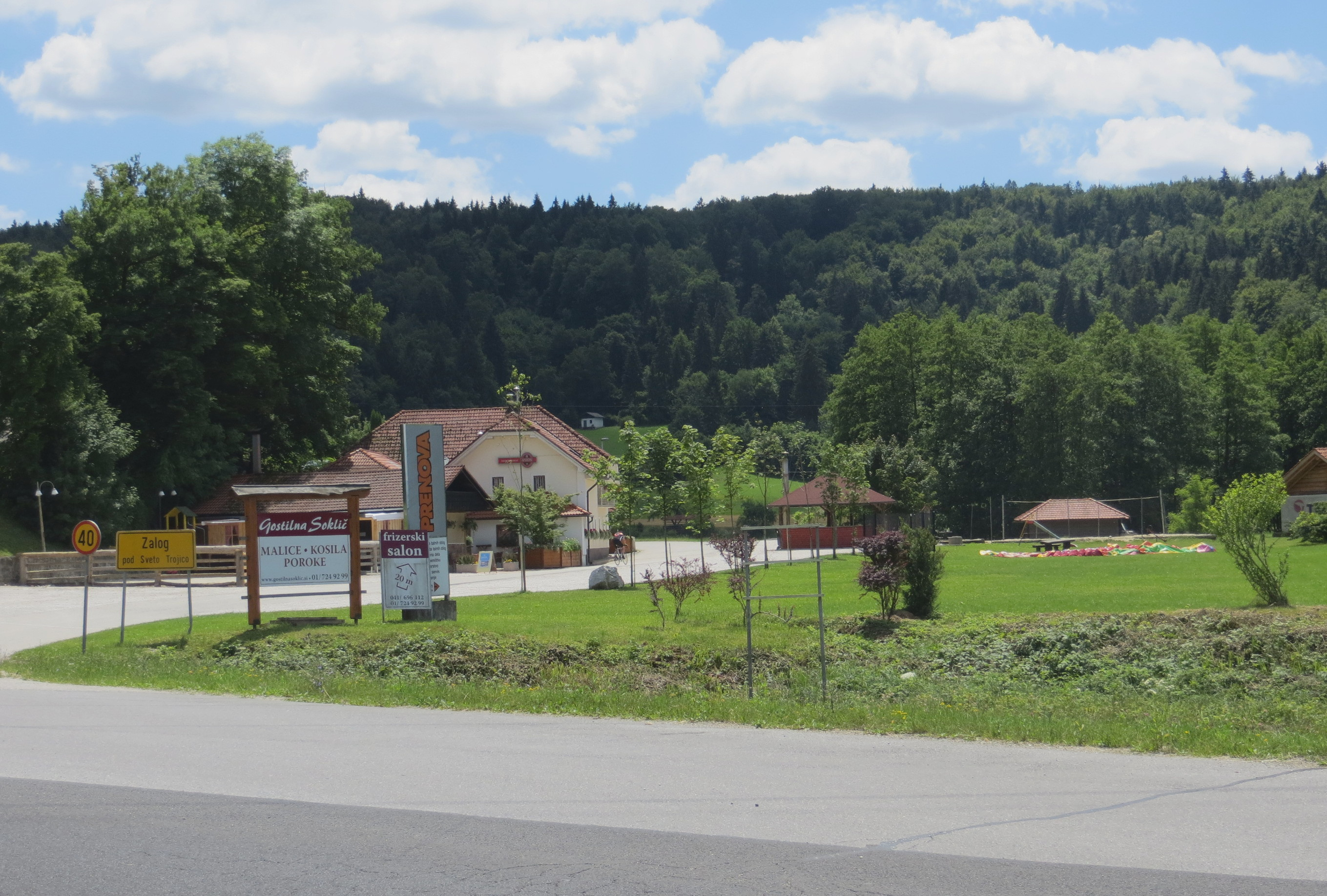

- Location in Slovenia
- Coordinates: 46°8′5.23″N 14°40′45.45″E
- Country: Slovenia
- Traditional region: Upper Carniola
- Statistical region: Central Slovenia
- Municipality: Domžale

Area
  - Total: 0.63 km^{2} (0.24 sq mi)
- Elevation: 313.1 m (1,027 ft)

Population (2020)
  - Total: 95
  - Density: 150/km^{2} (390/sq mi)

Zalog pod Sveto Trojico (pronounced [ˈzaːlɔk pɔt ˈsʋeːtɔ tɾɔˈjiːtsɔ]) is a small dispersed settlement east of Domžale in the Upper Carniola region of Slovenia.

== Name ==
The name of the settlement was changed from Zalog pod Sveto Trojico (literally, 'Zalog below Holy Trinity') to Zalog pod Trojico (literally, 'Zalog below Trinity') in 1955. The name was changed on the basis of the 1948 Law on Names of Settlements and Designations of Squares, Streets, and Buildings as part of efforts by Slovenia's postwar communist government to remove religious elements from toponyms. The name Zalog pod Sveto Trojico was restored in 1992.
