= Goričica pri Ihanu =

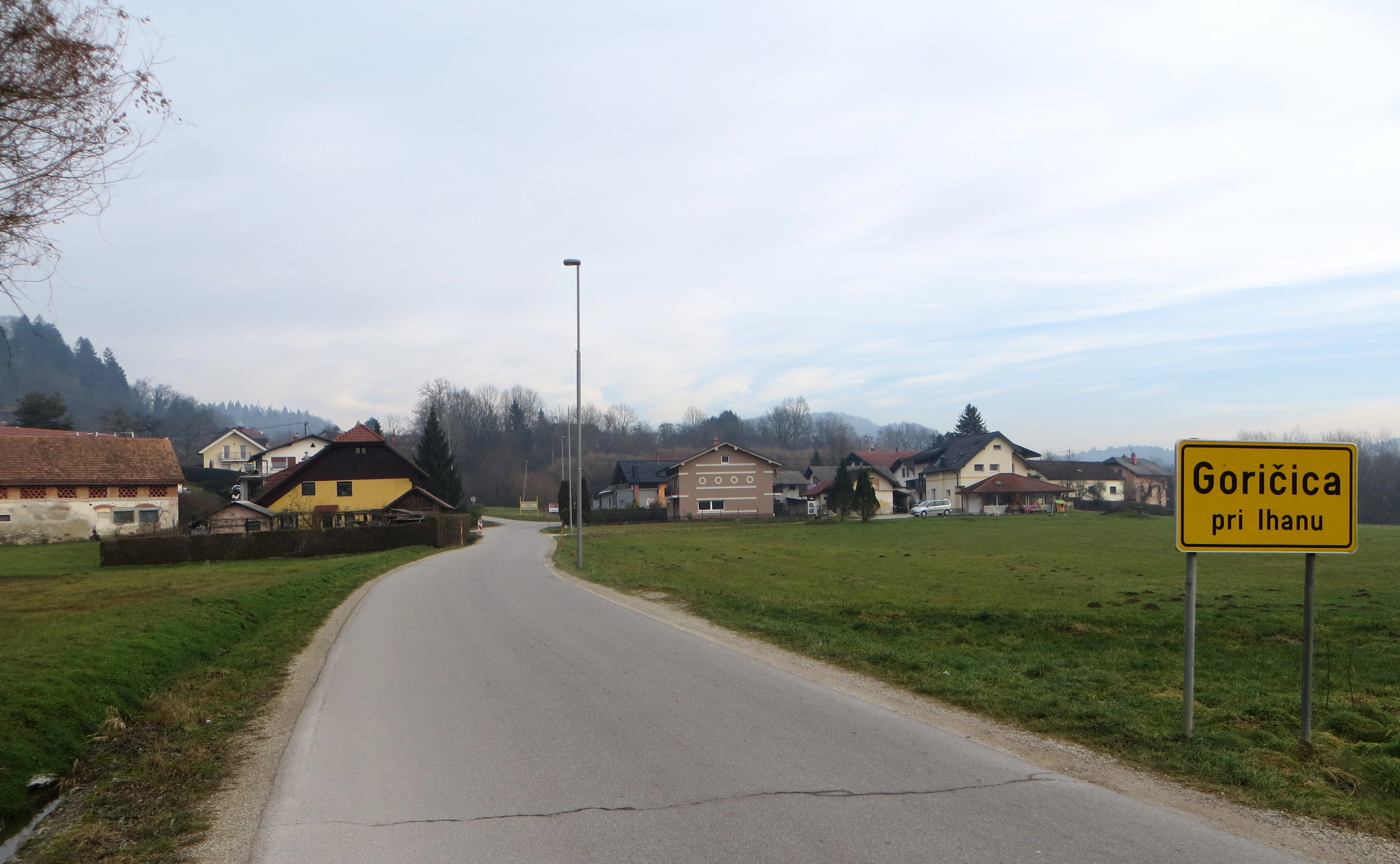

- Location in Slovenia
- Coordinates: 46°7′19.65″N 14°37′41.25″E
- Country: Slovenia
- Traditional region: Upper Carniola
- Statistical region: Central Slovenia
- Municipality: Domžale

Area
  - Total: 1.00 km^{2} (0.39 sq mi)
- Elevation: 314.1 m (1,031 ft)

Population (2020)
  - Total: 260
  - Density: 260/km^{2} (670/sq mi)

Goričica pri Ihanu (pronounced [ɡɔˈɾiːtʃitsa pɾi iˈxaːnu]) is a small settlement east of Ihan in the Municipality of Domžale in the Upper Carniola region of Slovenia.

== Name ==
The name of the settlement was changed from Goričica to Goričica pri Ihanu in 1953.

== Church ==
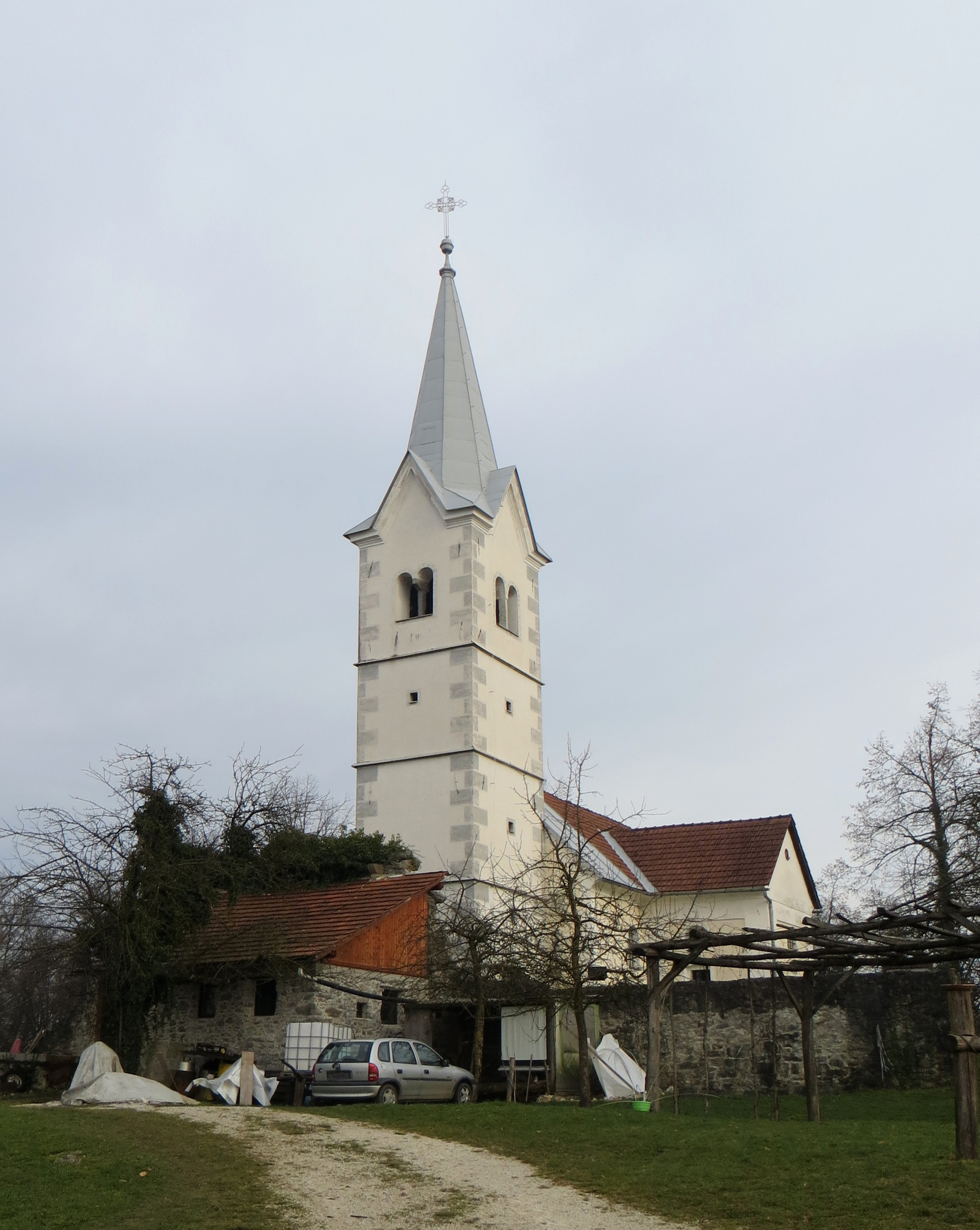
Saint Cunigunde's Church

The church in Goričica pri Ihanu stands on a hill in the northern part of the village. It is dedicated to Saint Cunigunde of Luxembourg.
