= Municipality of Domžale =

Municipality of Slovenia

Municipality of Domžale Občina Domžale
- Municipality
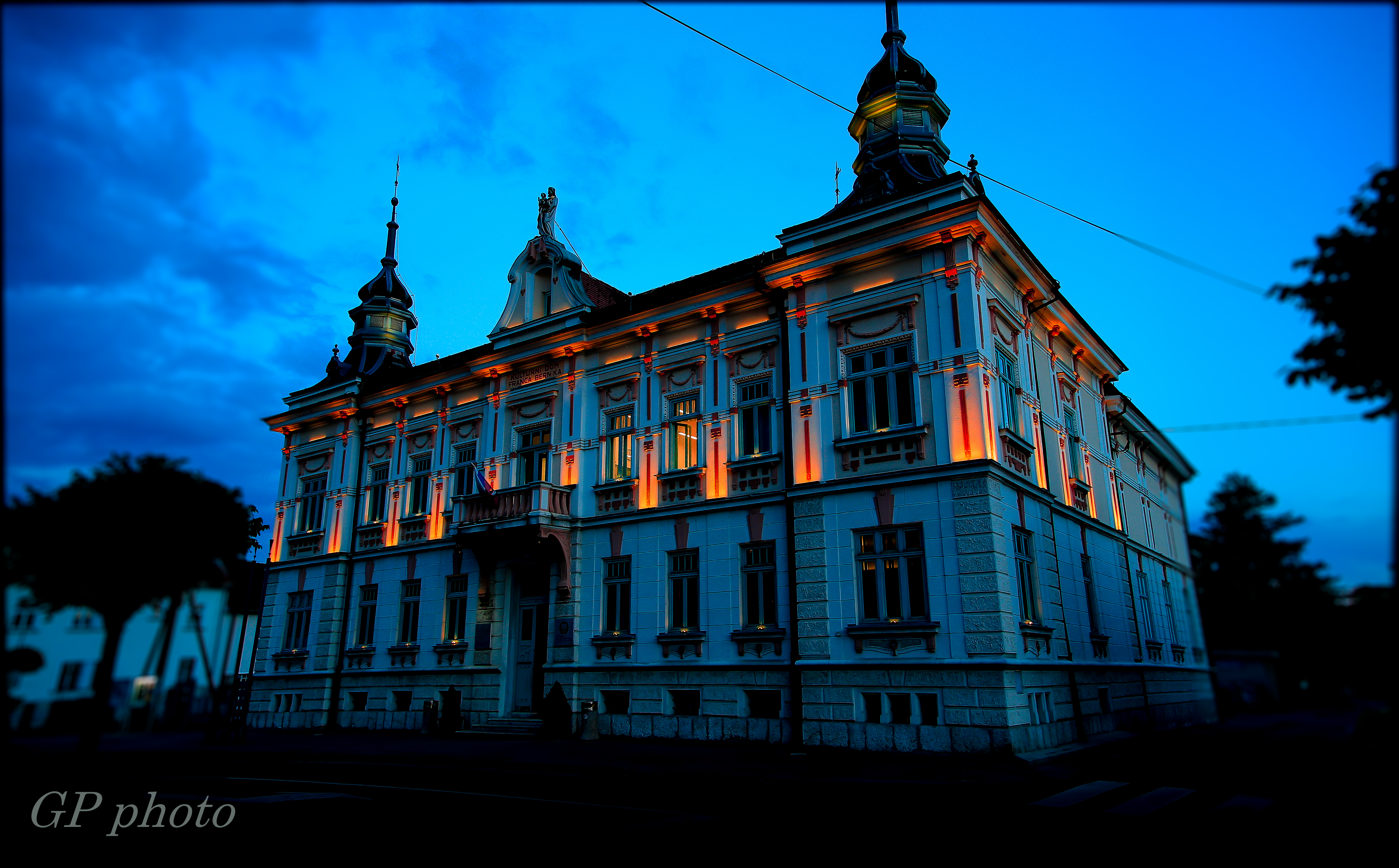

- Location of the Municipality of Domžale in Slovenia
- Coordinates: 46°08′N 14°36′E
- Country: Slovenia

Government
  - Mayor: Matej Slapar (Independent)

Area
  - Total: 72.3 km^{2} (27.9 sq mi)

Population (2002)
  - Total: 32,205
  - Density: 445/km^{2} (1,150/sq mi)
- Time zone: UTC+01 (CET)
  - Summer (DST): UTC+02 (CEST)
- Area code: 01
- Website: www.domzale.si

The Municipality of Domžale (Slovene: Občina Domžale, pronounced [ˈóːptʃina dɔmˈʒàːlɛ]) is a municipality in the Ljubljana Basin in Slovenia. The seat of the municipality is the town of Domžale.

== Geography ==
The municipality lies near the foothills of the Kamnik Alps and is crossed by the Kamnik Bistrica River, which originates in these mountains. Its landscape is characterized by forested hills and agricultural plains.

=== Settlements ===
In addition to the municipal seat of Domžale, the municipality also includes the following settlements:

- Bišče
- Brdo
- Brezje pri Dobu
- Brezovica pri Dobu
- Češenik
- Depala Vas
- Dob
- Dobovlje
- Dolenje
- Dragomelj
- Goričica pri Ihanu
- Gorjuša
- Homec
- Hudo
- Ihan
- Jasen
- Kokošnje
- Količevo
- Kolovec
- Krtina
- Laze pri Domžalah
- Mala Loka
- Nožice
- Podrečje
- Prelog
- Preserje pri Radomljah
- Pšata
- Rača
- Račni Vrh
- Radomlje
- Rodica
- Rova
- Selo pri Ihanu
- Šentpavel pri Domžalah
- Škocjan
- Škrjančevo
- Spodnje Jarše
- Srednje Jarše
- Studenec pri Krtini
- Sveta Trojica
- Turnše
- Vir
- Zaboršt
- Zagorica pri Rovah
- Zalog pod Sveto Trojico
- Žeje
- Želodnik
- Zgornje Jarše
- Žiče

== History ==
The remains of an ice-age hunter's dwelling found at Hag's Cave (Slovene: Babja jama) in Gorjuša date to 15,000 BP. There is archaeological evidence of a pre-Roman Illyrian and Celtic settlement. Roman finds date to the time of the road connecting Aquileia, Æmona (today Ljubljana, and Celeia (today Celje). The area was first mentioned in documents dating to the 12th century. A local nobleman and owner of Krumperk Castle, Adam Ravbar, was a victor in the Battle of Sisak in 1593, in which the Ottoman army was defeated. Economic development accelerated in the 19th century with the industrialization of the local craft of plaiting straw.
