= Hudo, Domžale =

Hudo
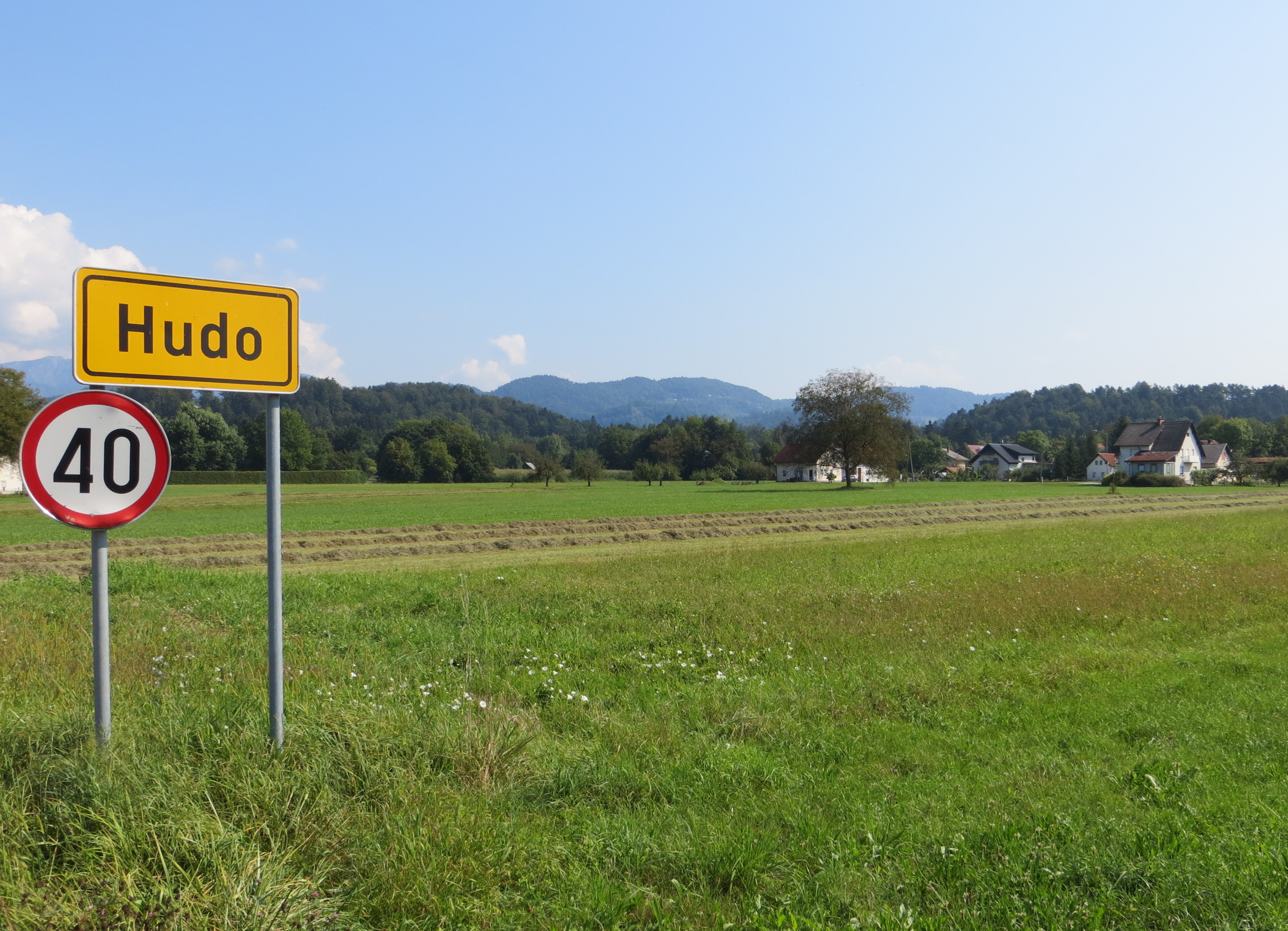

- Location in Slovenia
- Coordinates: 46°10′59.09″N 14°36′48.48″E
- Country: Slovenia
- Traditional region: Upper Carniola
- Statistical region: Central Slovenia
- Municipality: Domžale

Area
  - Total: 1.4 km^{2} (0.54 sq mi)
- Elevation: 339.8 m (1,115 ft)

Population (2020)
  - Total: 222
  - Density: 160/km^{2} (410/sq mi)

Hudo (pronounced [ˈxuːdɔ]) is a settlement north of Radomlje in the Municipality of Domžale in the Upper Carniola region of Slovenia.
