= Brezje pri Dobu =

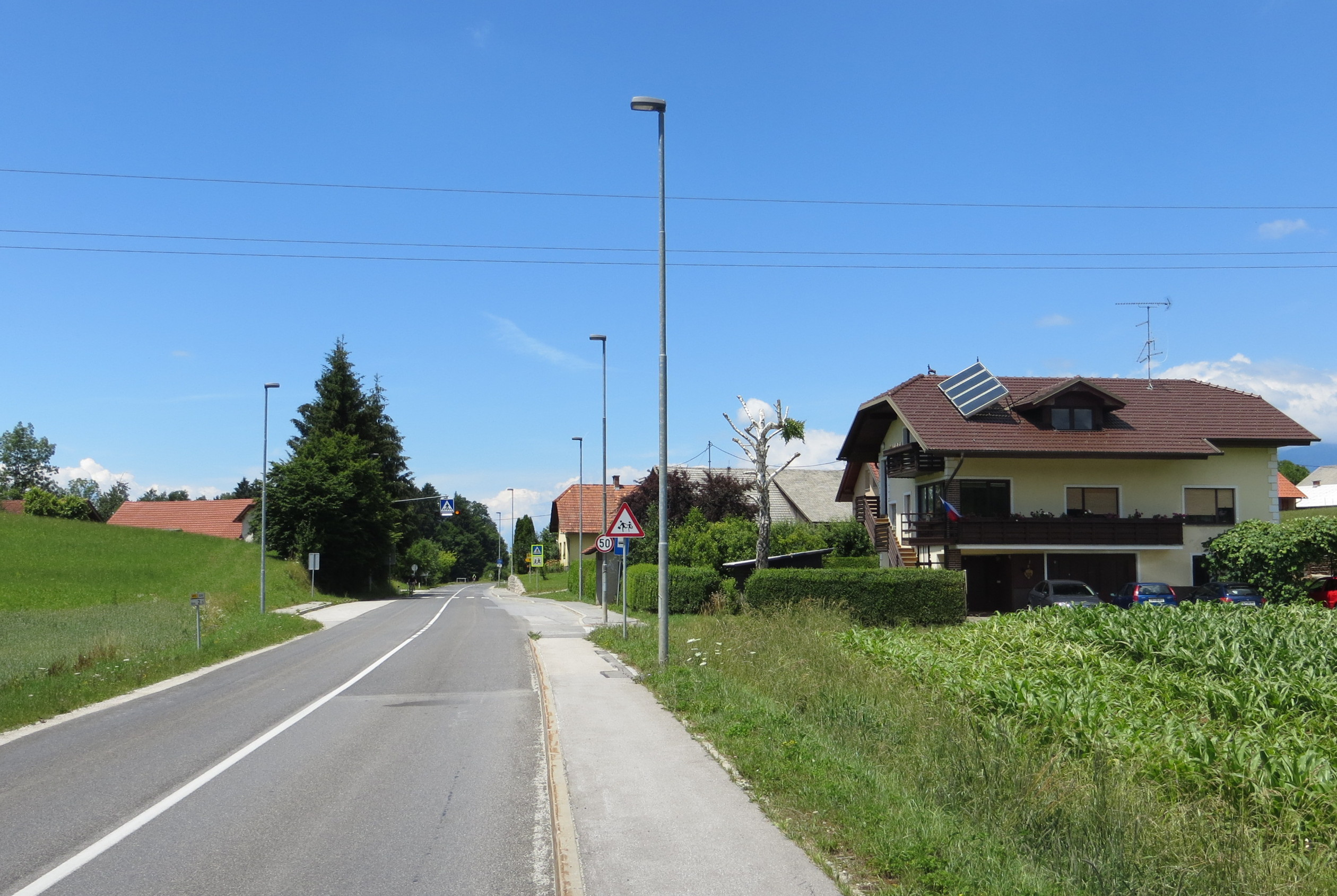

- Location in Slovenia
- Coordinates: 46°8′36.85″N 14°40′1.93″E
- Country: Slovenia
- Traditional region: Upper Carniola
- Statistical region: Central Slovenia
- Municipality: Domžale
- Elevation: 313.2 m (1,028 ft)

Population (2020)
  - Total: 121

Brezje pri Dobu (pronounced [ˈbɾeːzjɛ pɾi ˈdoːbu]; German: Bresje) is a settlement in the Municipality of Domžale in the Upper Carniola region of Slovenia.

== Name ==
Brezje pri Dobu was attested in written sources as Pirch in 1287. The name of the settlement was changed from Brezje to Brezje pri Dobu in 1953. In the past, the German name was Bresje.
