= Selo pri Ihanu =

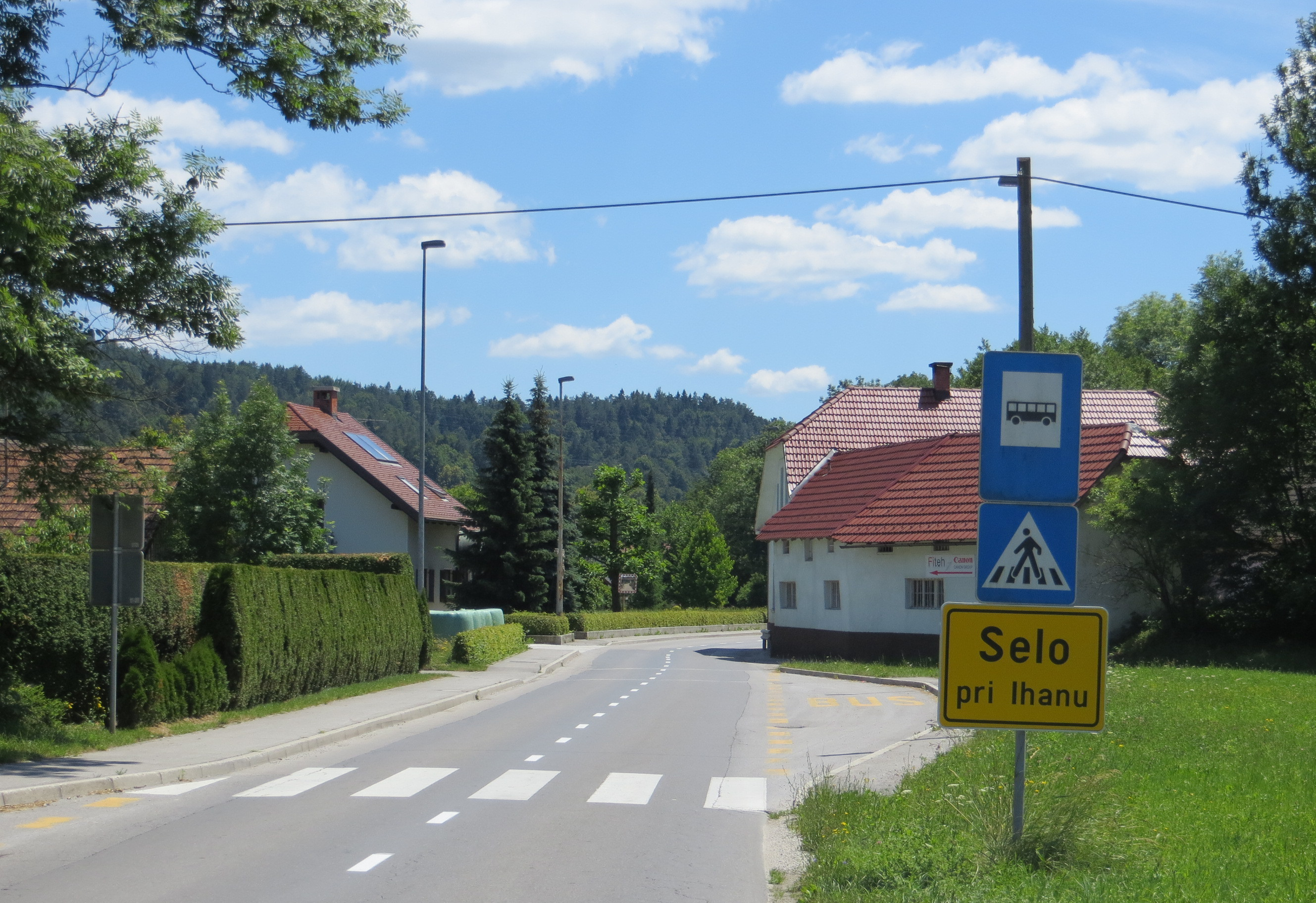

- Location in Slovenia
- Coordinates: 46°6′30.03″N 14°37′21.09″E
- Country: Slovenia
- Traditional region: Upper Carniola
- Statistical region: Central Slovenia
- Municipality: Domžale

Area
  - Total: 3.23 km^{2} (1.25 sq mi)
- Elevation: 280.3 m (920 ft)

Population (2020)
  - Total: 336
  - Density: 104/km^{2} (269/sq mi)

Selo pri Ihanu (pronounced [ˈsɛːlɔ pɾi iˈxaːnu]; German: Sela) is a settlement south of Ihan in the Municipality of Domžale in the Upper Carniola region of Slovenia.

== Name ==
The name of the settlement was changed from Selo to Selo pri Ihanu (literally, 'Selo near Ihan') in 1953. The name Selo is derived from the Slovene common noun selo 'village, settlement'. In the past the German name was Sela.
