= Gorjuša =

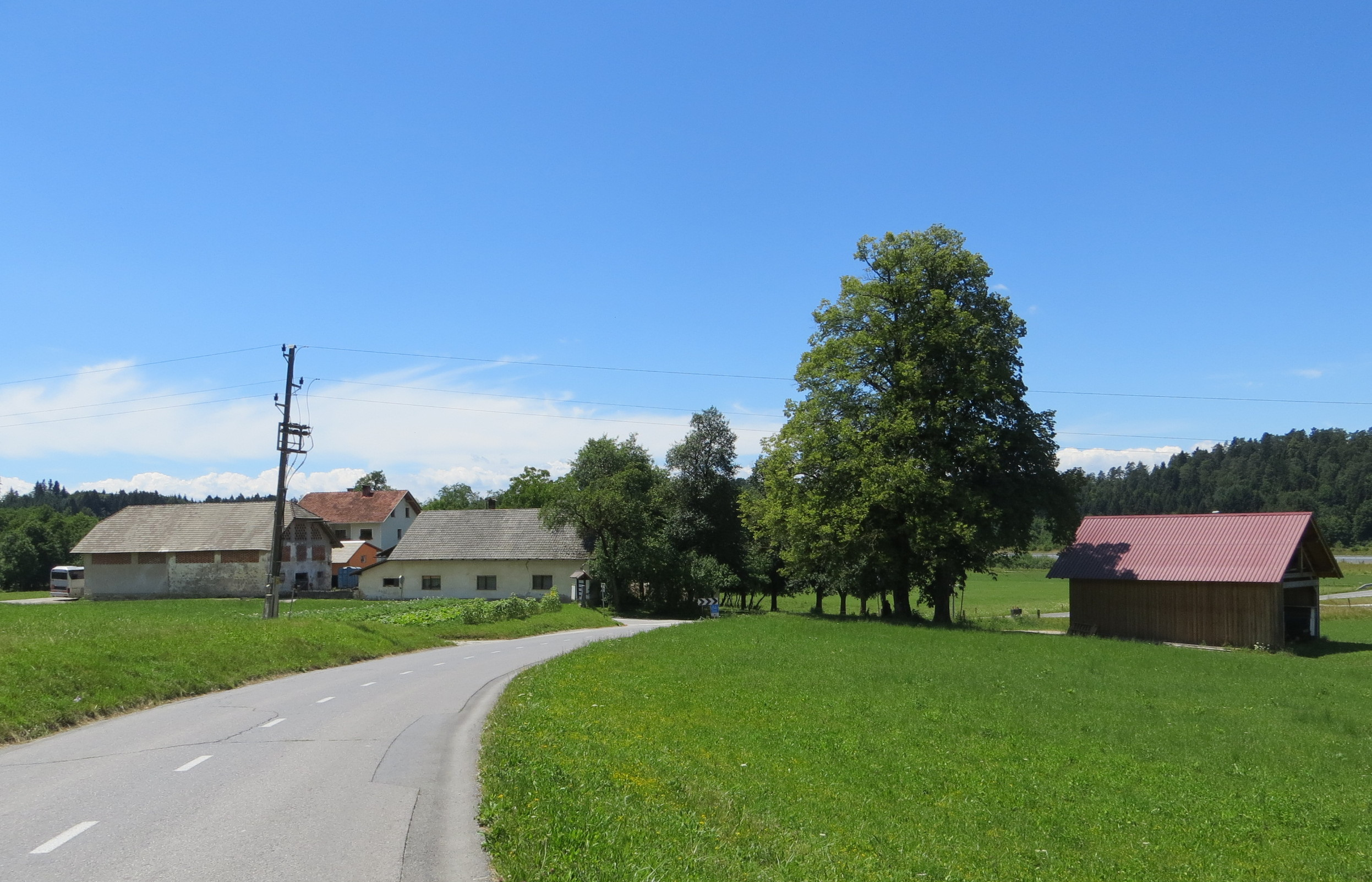

- Location in Slovenia
- Coordinates: 46°8′19.67″N 14°38′11.13″E
- Country: Slovenia
- Traditional region: Upper Carniola
- Statistical region: Central Slovenia
- Municipality: Domžale

Area
  - Total: 2.99 km^{2} (1.15 sq mi)
- Elevation: 335.2 m (1,100 ft)

Population (2020)
  - Total: 192
  - Density: 64.2/km^{2} (166/sq mi)

Gorjuša (pronounced [ɡɔˈɾjuːʃa]) is a small village in the Municipality of Domžale in the Upper Carniola region of Slovenia.

Krumperk Castle stands just south of the settlement.
