= Kokošnje =

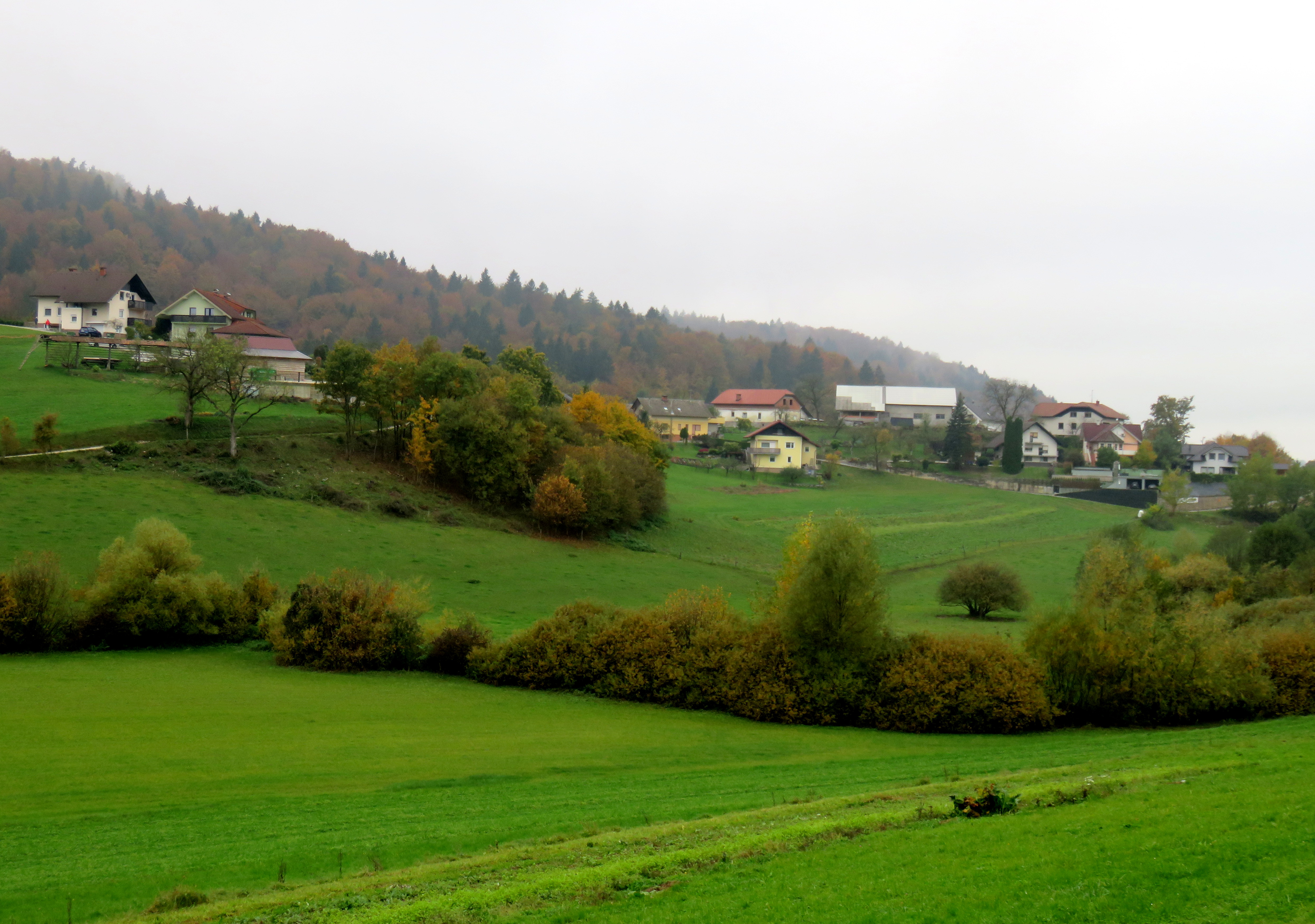

- Location in Slovenia
- Coordinates: 46°8′1.1″N 14°41′15.29″E
- Country: Slovenia
- Traditional region: Upper Carniola
- Statistical region: Central Slovenia
- Municipality: Domžale

Area
  - Total: 0.56 km^{2} (0.22 sq mi)
- Elevation: 333.3 m (1,094 ft)

Population (2020)
  - Total: 116
  - Density: 210/km^{2} (540/sq mi)

Kokošnje (pronounced [kɔˈkoːʃnjɛ]) is a settlement of around 30 houses east of Domžale in the Upper Carniola region of Slovenia.

== Name ==
Kokošnje was attested in written sources as Kokoschin in 1347, Koköschen in 1385, and Kokoschina in 1449, among other spellings.
