= Škrjančevo =

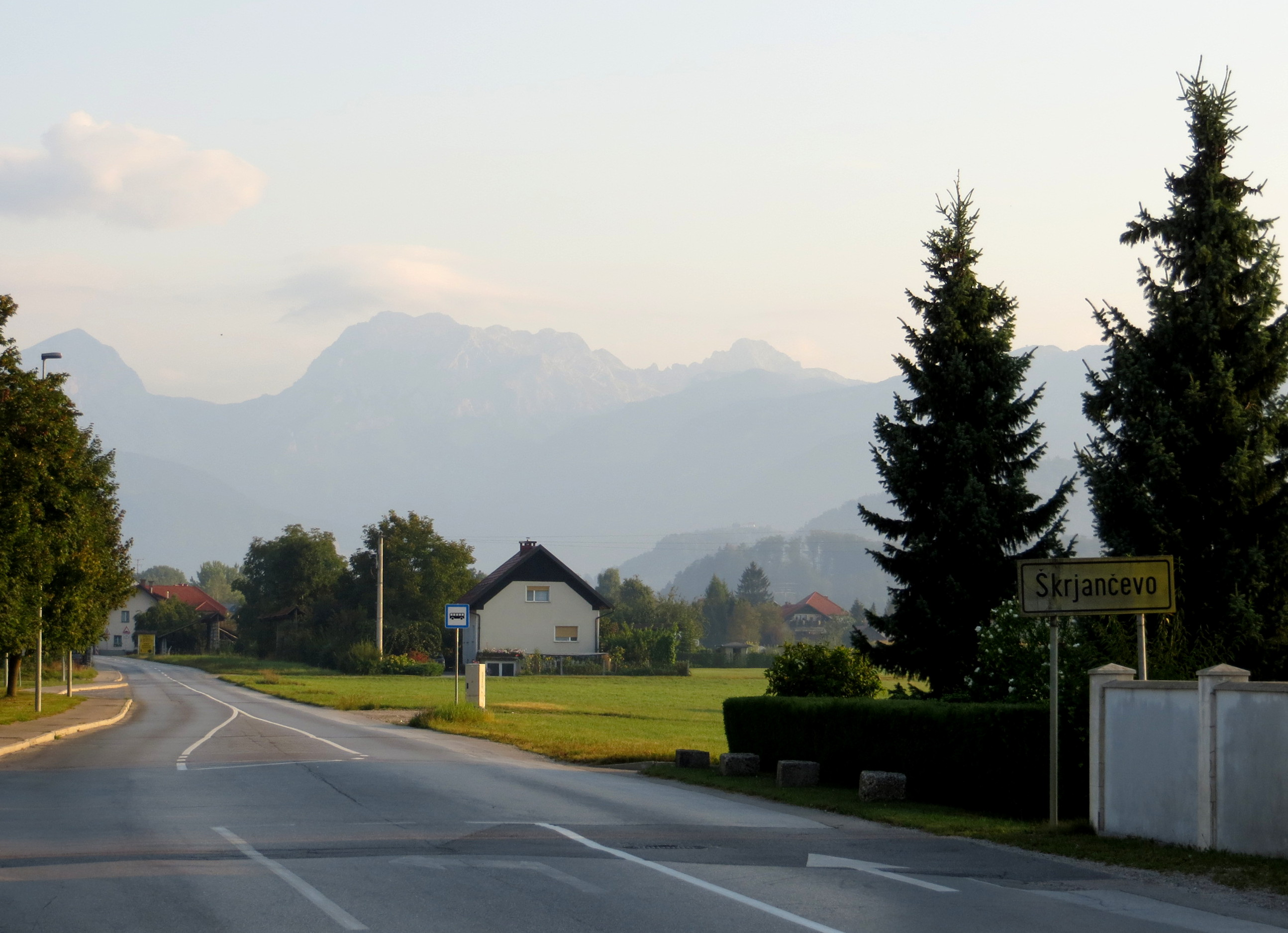

- Location in Slovenia
- Coordinates: 46°10′4.93″N 14°36′28.81″E
- Country: Slovenia
- Traditional region: Upper Carniola
- Statistical region: Central Slovenia
- Municipality: Domžale

Area
  - Total: 0.51 km^{2} (0.20 sq mi)
- Elevation: 323.4 m (1,061 ft)

Population (2020)
  - Total: 349
  - Density: 680/km^{2} (1,800/sq mi)

Škrjančevo (pronounced [ʃkəˈɾjaːntʃɛʋɔ]) is a settlement on the left bank of the Kamnik Bistrica River south of Radomlje in the Municipality of Domžale in the Upper Carniola region of Slovenia.
