= Zagorica pri Rovah =

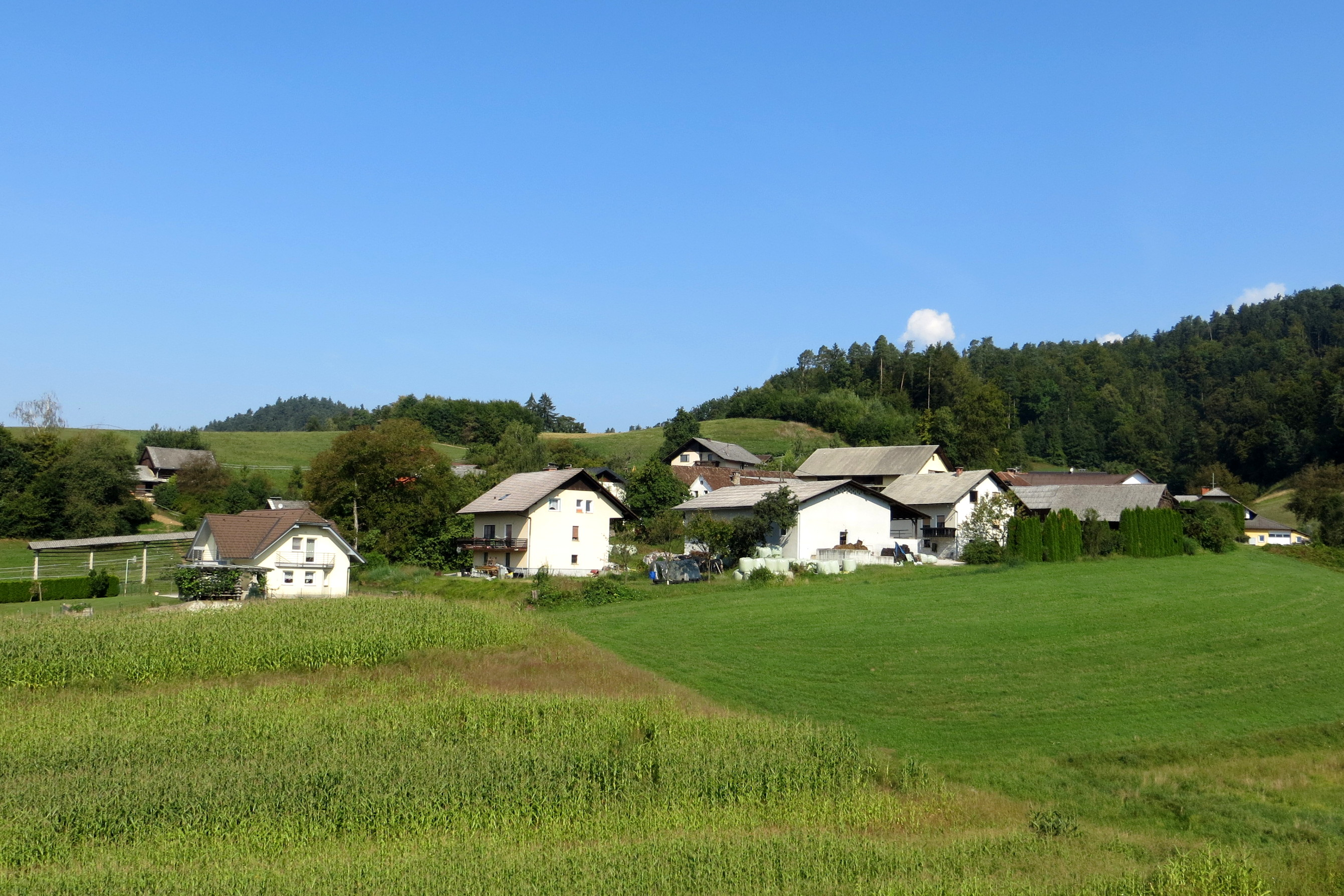

- Location in Slovenia
- Coordinates: 46°10′52.78″N 14°39′22.87″E
- Country: Slovenia
- Traditional region: Upper Carniola
- Statistical region: Central Slovenia
- Municipality: Domžale

Area
  - Total: 0.58 km^{2} (0.22 sq mi)
- Elevation: 378.2 m (1,241 ft)

Population (2020)
  - Total: 42
  - Density: 72/km^{2} (190/sq mi)

Zagorica pri Rovah (pronounced [zaɡɔˈɾiːtsa pɾi ˈɾɔːʋax] or [zaɡɔˈɾiːtsa pɾi ˈɾoːʋax]; German: Sagoritz) is a small village east of Radomlje in the Municipality of Domžale in the Upper Carniola region of Slovenia.

== Name ==
The name of the settlement was changed from Zagorica to Zagorica pri Rovah in 1955. In the past the German name was Sagoritz.
