= Mala Loka, Domžale =

Mala Loka
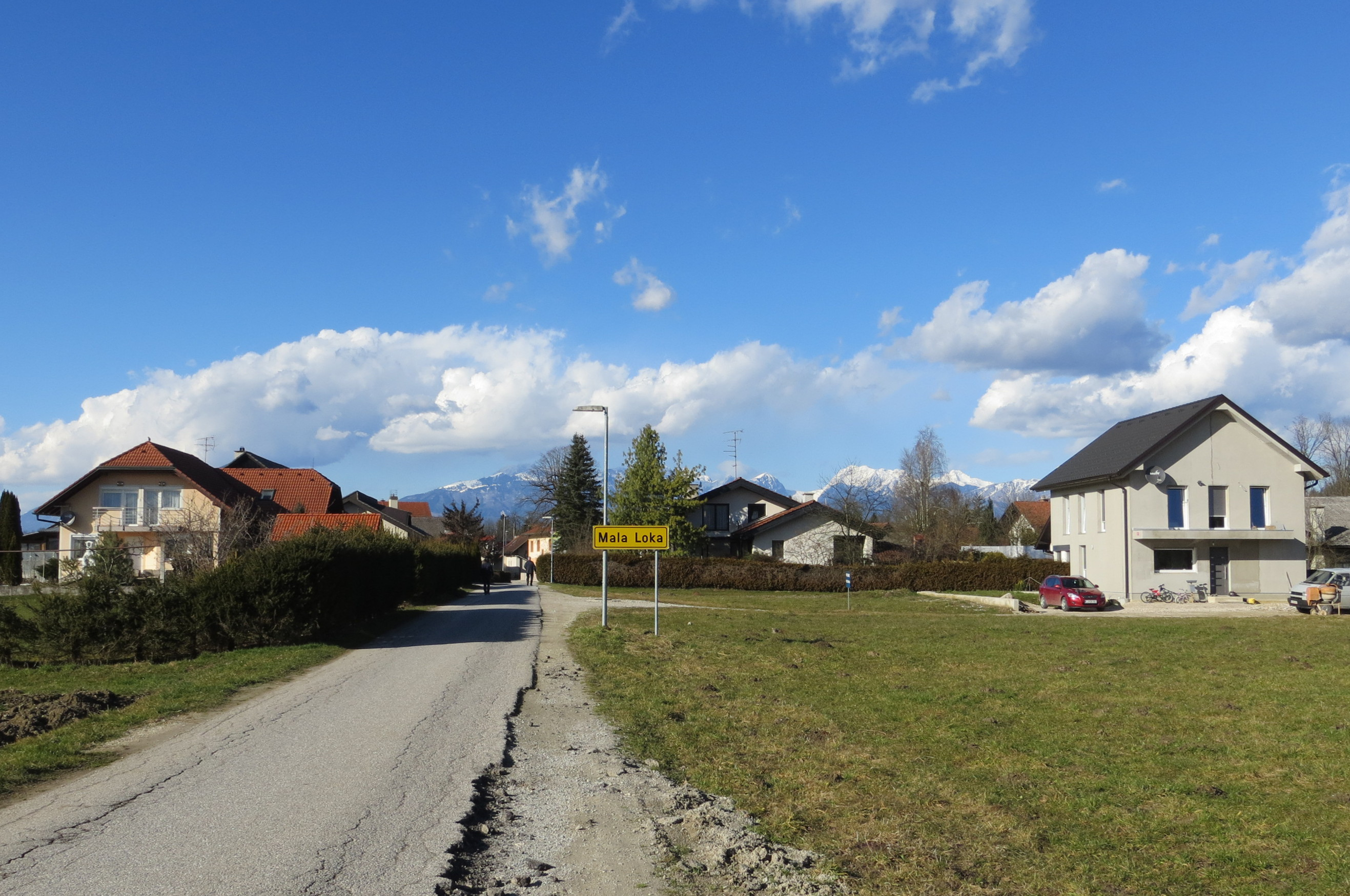

- Location in Slovenia
- Coordinates: 46°6′32.46″N 14°34′34.04″E
- Country: Slovenia
- Traditional region: Upper Carniola
- Statistical region: Central Slovenia
- Municipality: Domžale

Area
  - Total: 0.36 km^{2} (0.14 sq mi)
- Elevation: 283 m (928 ft)

Population (2020)
  - Total: 199
  - Density: 550/km^{2} (1,400/sq mi)

Mala Loka (pronounced [ˈmaːla ˈloːka]; German: Kleinlack) is a small settlement on the left bank of the Kamnik Bistrica River south of Domžale in the Upper Carniola region of Slovenia.
