= Žeje, Domžale =

Žeje
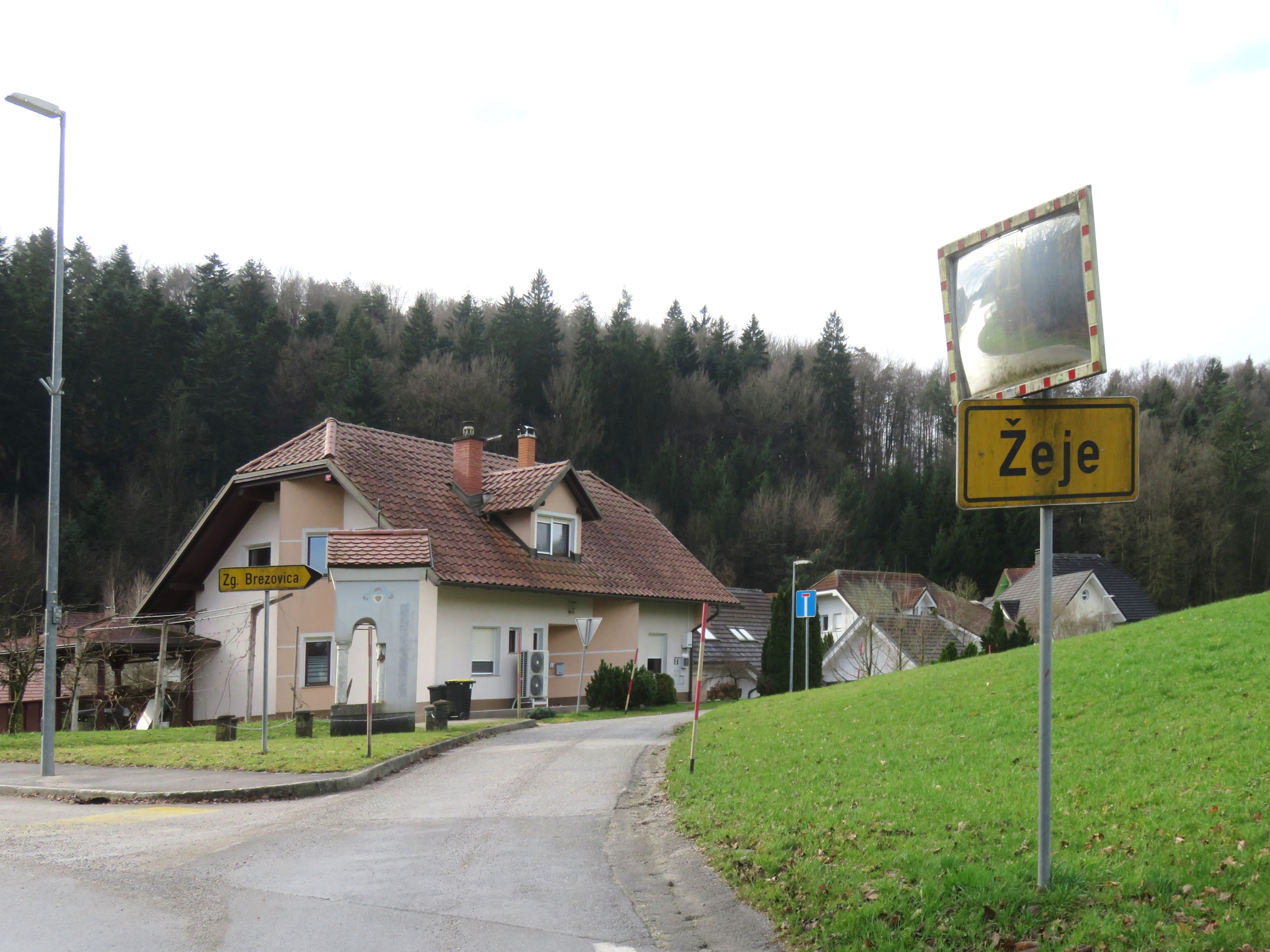

- Location in Slovenia
- Coordinates: 46°7′32.05″N 14°39′56.72″E
- Country: Slovenia
- Traditional region: Upper Carniola
- Statistical region: Central Slovenia
- Municipality: Domžale
- Elevation: 460.4 m (1,510 ft)

Population (2020)
  - Total: 250

Žeje (pronounced [ˈʒɛːjɛ] or [ˈʒeːjɛ], German: Scheje) is a village in the Municipality of Domžale in the Upper Carniola region of Slovenia.
