= Pšata, Domžale =

Pšata
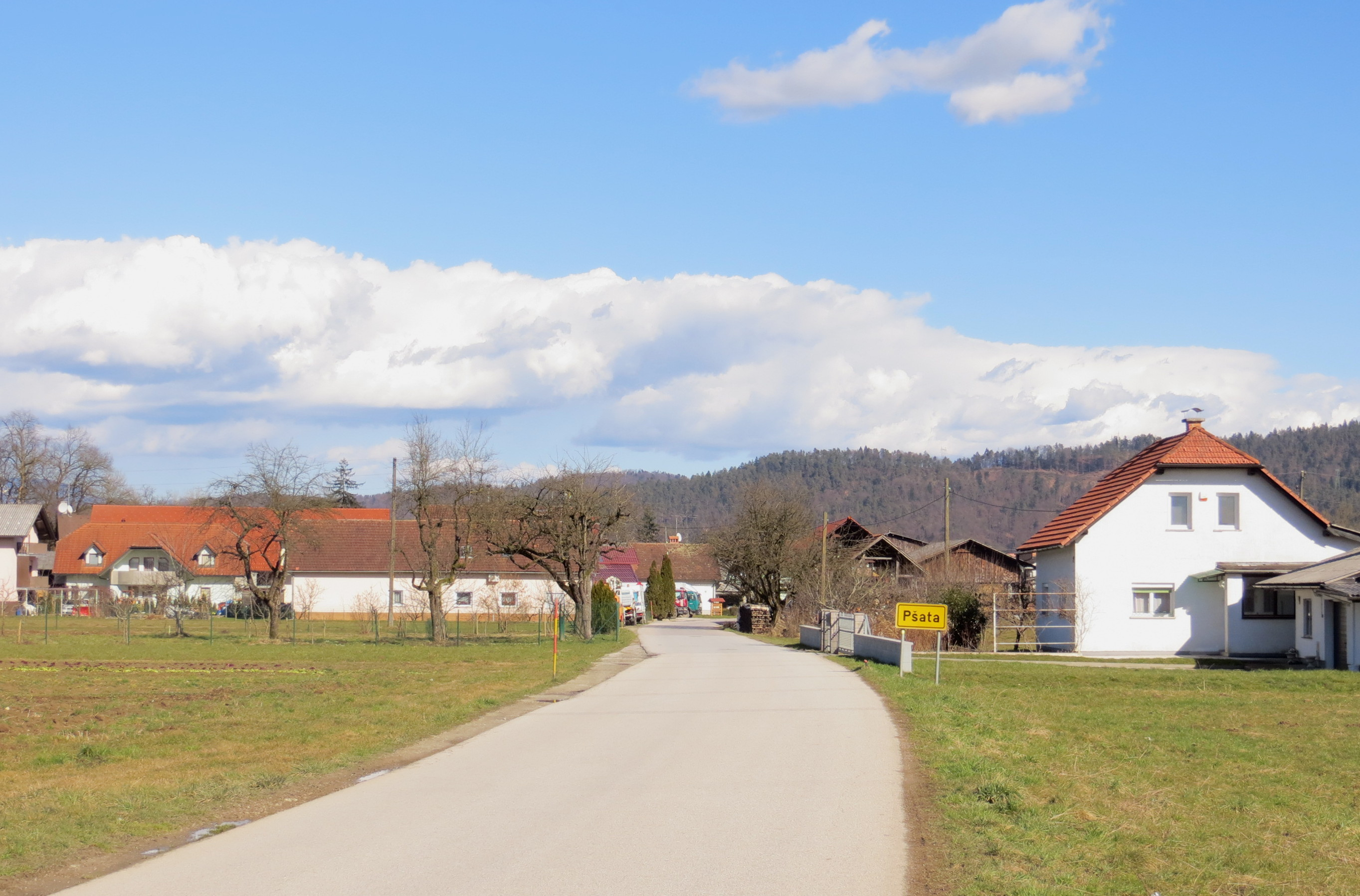

- Location in Slovenia
- Coordinates: 46°5′57.72″N 14°36′11″E
- Country: Slovenia
- Traditional region: Upper Carniola
- Statistical region: Central Slovenia
- Municipality: Domžale

Area
  - Total: 1.24 km^{2} (0.48 sq mi)
- Elevation: 279.6 m (917 ft)

Population (2020)
  - Total: 427
  - Density: 344/km^{2} (892/sq mi)

Pšata (pronounced [ˈpʃaːta]; German: Beischeid) is a small village south of Domžale in the Upper Carniola region of Slovenia.

== Church ==
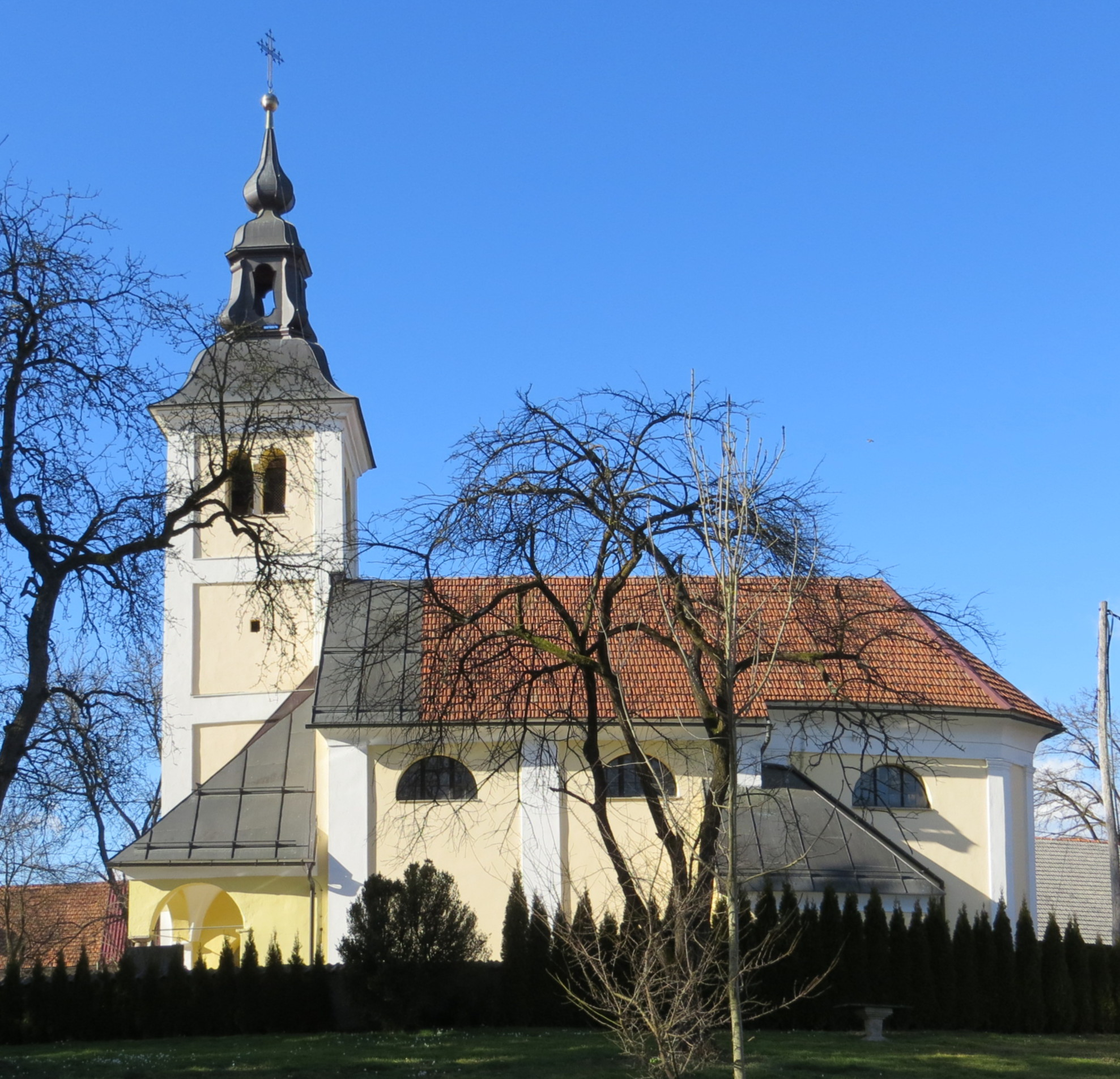
Saint Peter's Church

The local church is dedicated to Saint Peter.
