= Jasen, Domžale =

Jasen
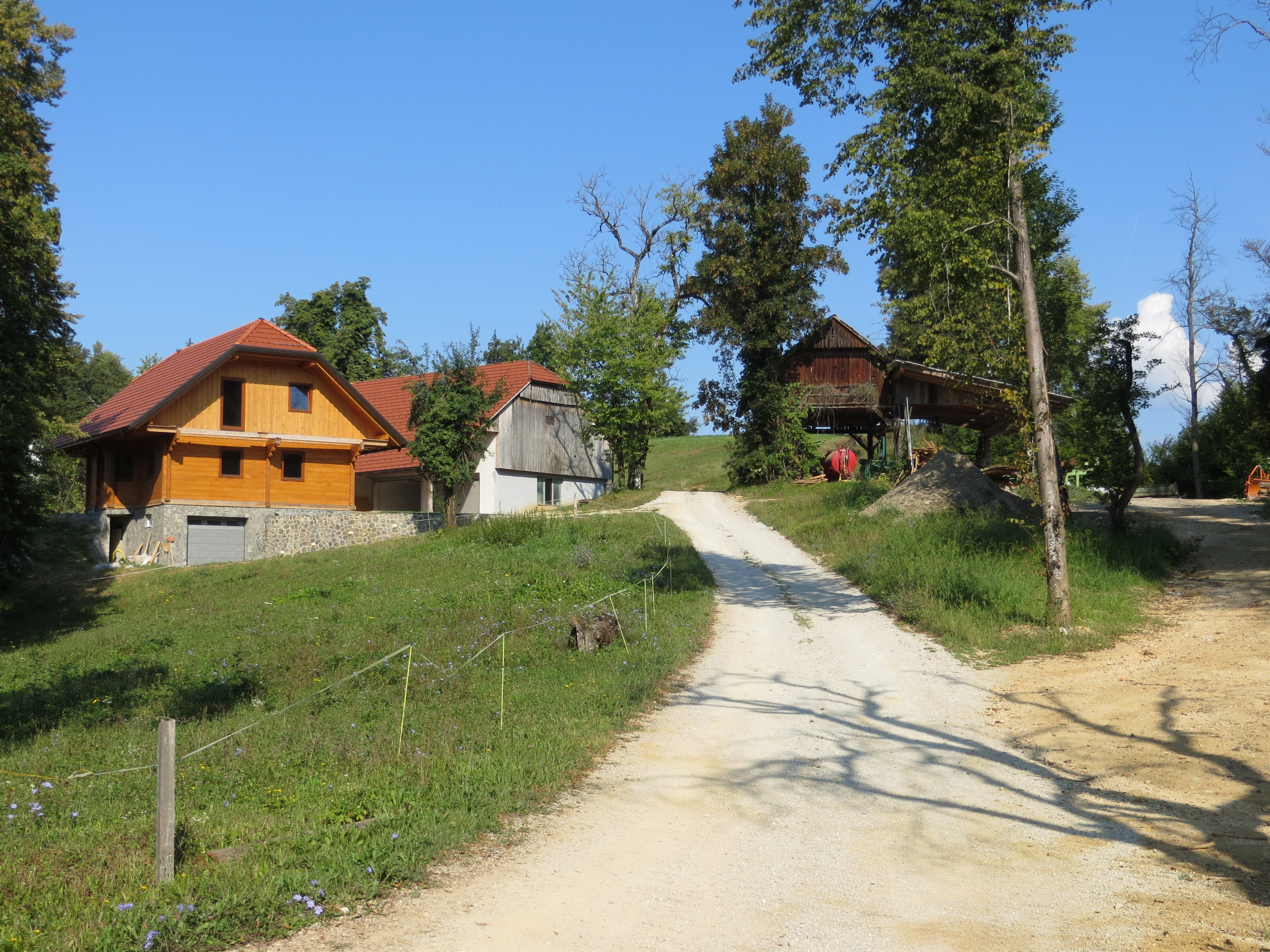

- Location in Slovenia
- Coordinates: 46°11′1.58″N 14°39′42.87″E
- Country: Slovenia
- Traditional region: Upper Carniola
- Statistical region: Central Slovenia
- Municipality: Domžale

Area
  - Total: 0.73 km^{2} (0.28 sq mi)
- Elevation: 463.9 m (1,522 ft)

Population (2019)
  - Total: 10

Jasen (pronounced [ˈjaːsən], in older sources Jasseno, German: Jassen) is a small settlement in the hills northeast of Domžale in the Upper Carniola region of Slovenia.
