= Laze pri Domžalah =

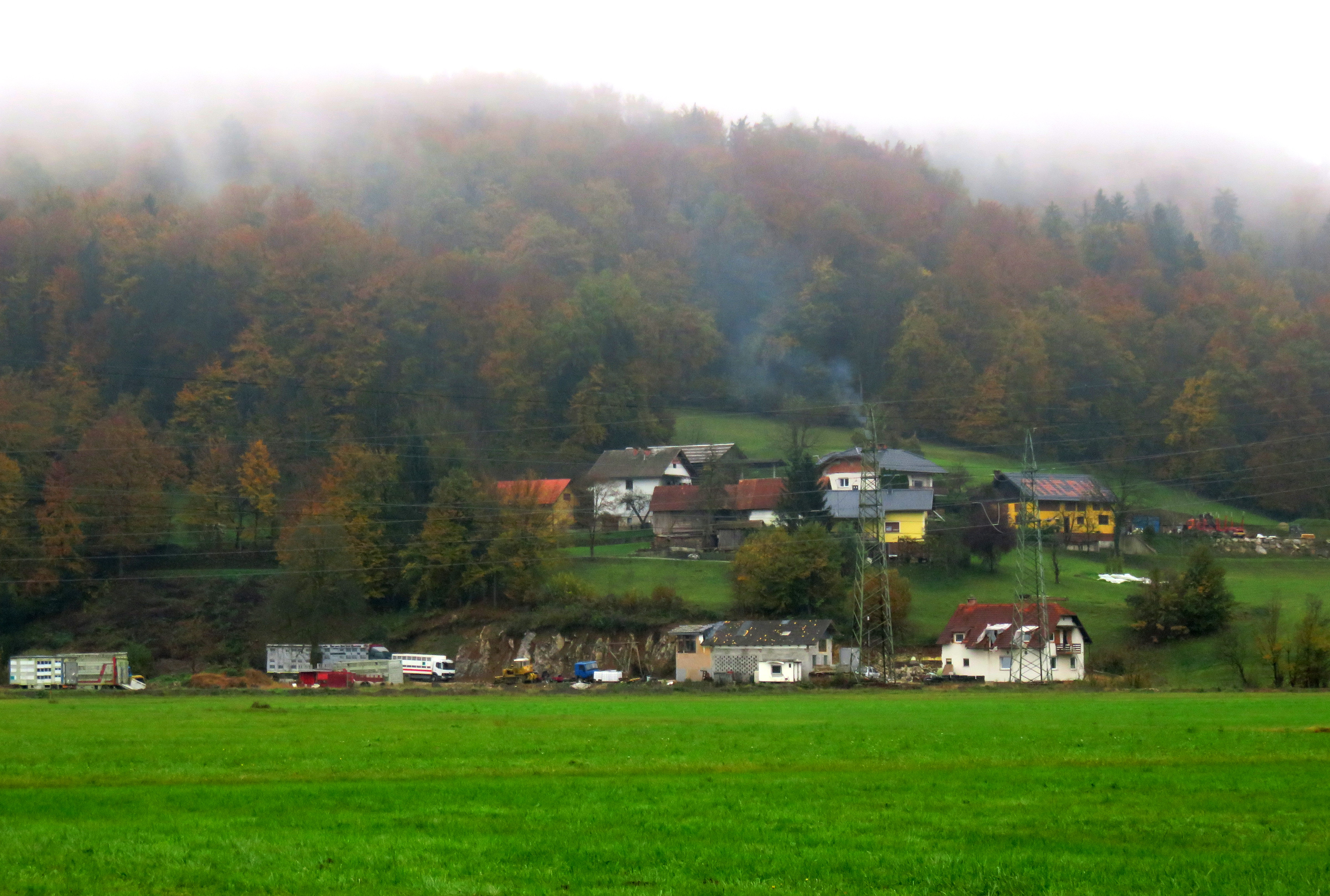

- Location in Slovenia
- Coordinates: 46°8′6.16″N 14°38′40.11″E
- Country: Slovenia
- Traditional region: Upper Carniola
- Statistical region: Central Slovenia
- Municipality: Domžale

Area
  - Total: 0.49 km^{2} (0.19 sq mi)
- Elevation: 321.6 m (1,055 ft)

Population (2020)
  - Total: 27
  - Density: 55/km^{2} (140/sq mi)

Laze pri Domžalah (pronounced [ˈlaːzɛ pɾi dɔmˈʒaːlax]; German: Laase) is a small settlement east of Domžale in the Upper Carniola region of Slovenia.

== Name ==
The name of the settlement was changed from Laze to Laze pri Domžalah in 1955.
