= Turnše =

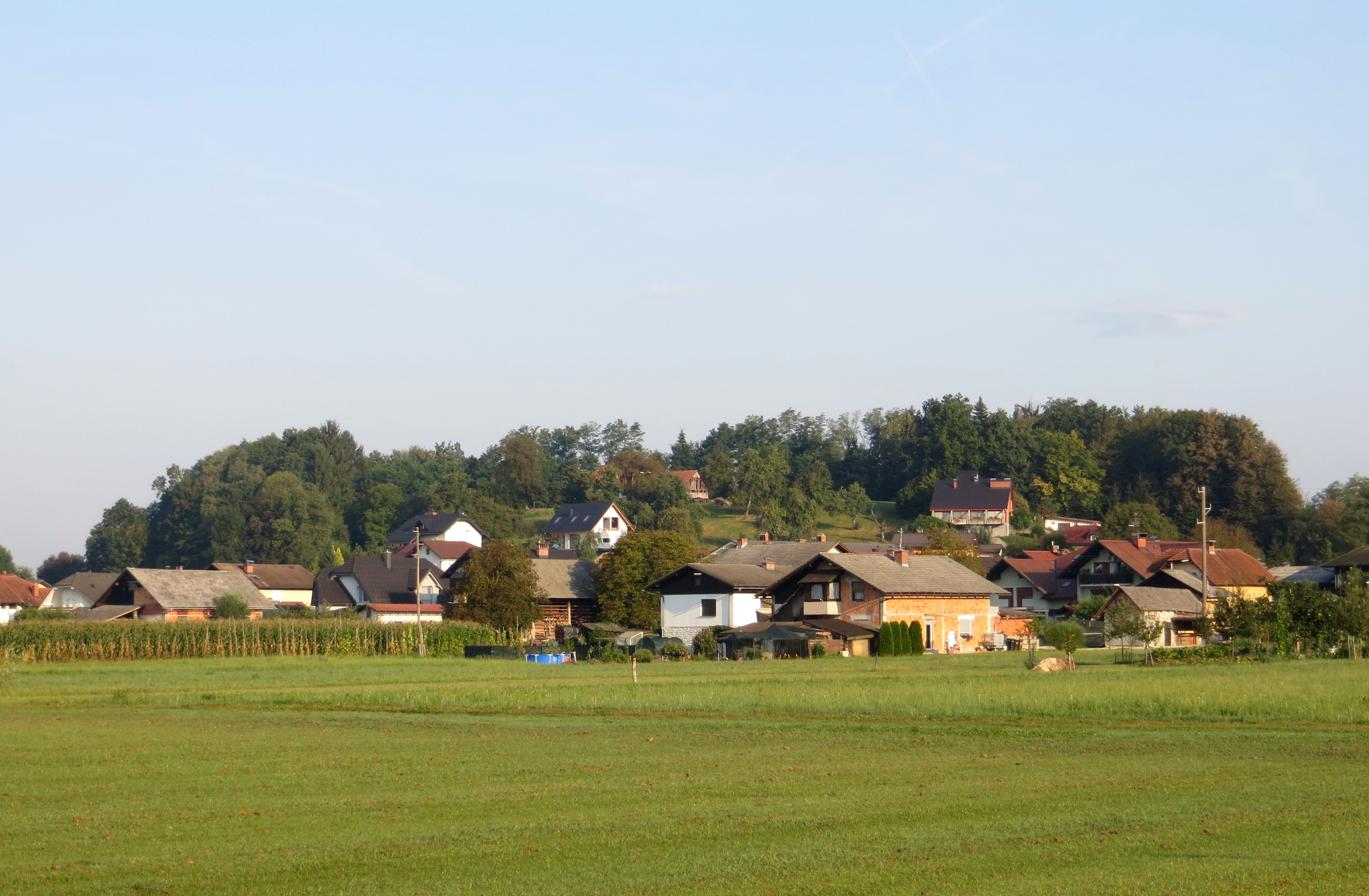

- Location in Slovenia
- Coordinates: 46°9′57.64″N 14°37′15.48″E
- Country: Slovenia
- Traditional region: Upper Carniola
- Statistical region: Central Slovenia
- Municipality: Domžale

Area
  - Total: 1.3 km^{2} (0.50 sq mi)
- Elevation: 345.9 m (1,135 ft)

Population (2020)
  - Total: 278
  - Density: 210/km^{2} (550/sq mi)

Turnše (pronounced [ˈtuːɾnʃɛ]; in older sources also Turnišče) is a settlement south of Radomlje in the Municipality of Domžale in the Upper Carniola region of Slovenia.

== Castle and manor ==
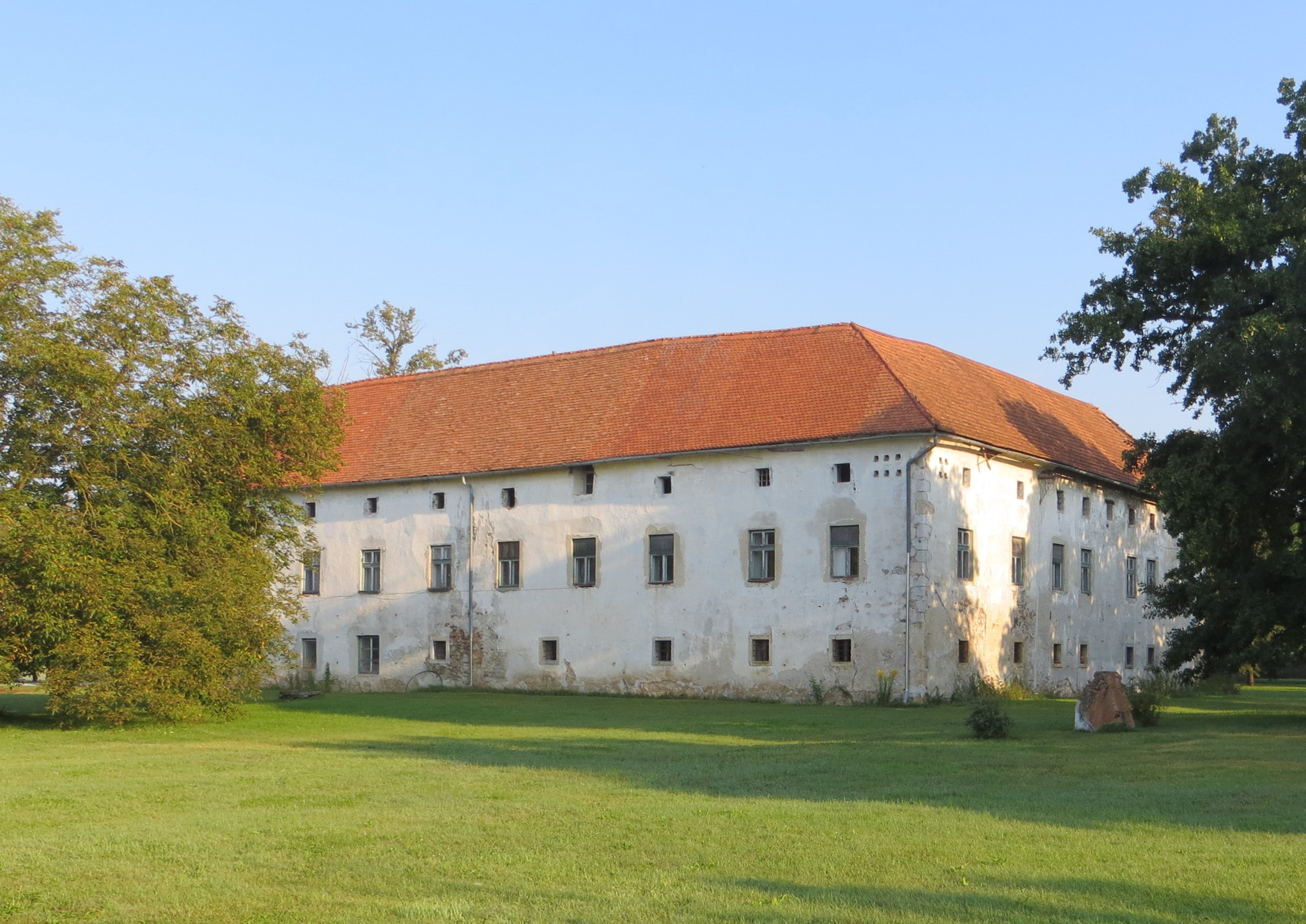
Črnelo Manor

Črnelo Castle (German: Rottenbüchel) used to stand on Hribar Hill (Slovene: Hribarjev hrib) above Turnše. The castle was first mentioned in written sources in 1297 but at the end of the 17th century it was abandoned for a manor below the castle. The castle itself was probably used for building material because no trace of it remains today.
