= Količevo =

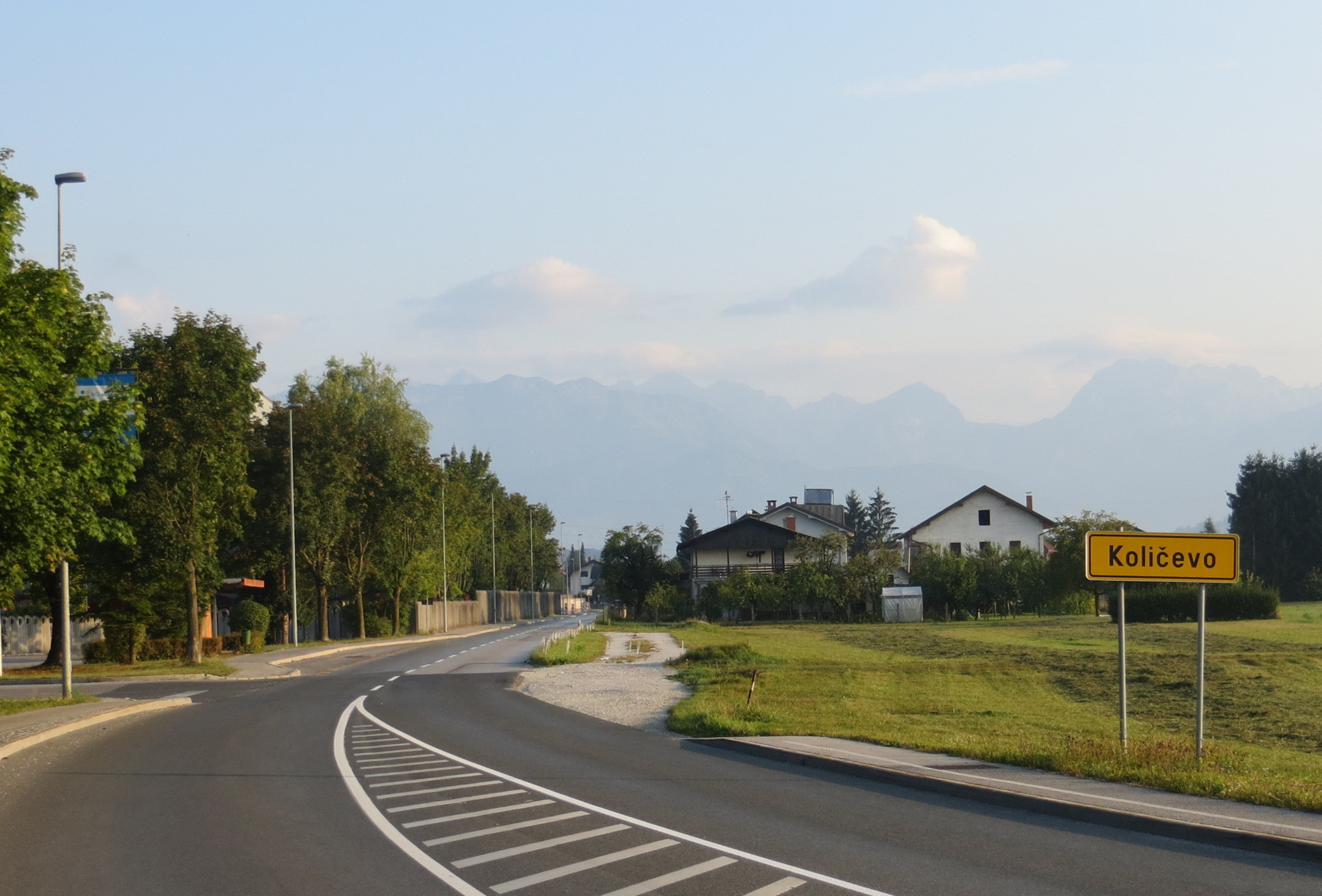

- Location in Slovenia
- Coordinates: 46°9′23.5″N 14°36′38.43″E
- Country: Slovenia
- Traditional region: Upper Carniola
- Statistical region: Central Slovenia
- Municipality: Domžale

Area
  - Total: 0.43 km^{2} (0.17 sq mi)
- Elevation: 312 m (1,024 ft)

Population (2020)
  - Total: 375
  - Density: 870/km^{2} (2,300/sq mi)

Količevo (pronounced [kɔˈliːtʃɛʋɔ]) is a settlement on the left bank of the Kamnik Bistrica River north of Domžale in the Upper Carniola region of Slovenia. Urbanization has meant that Količevo is rapidly becoming a suburb of Domžale, rather than a distinct separate settlement.
