= Želodnik =

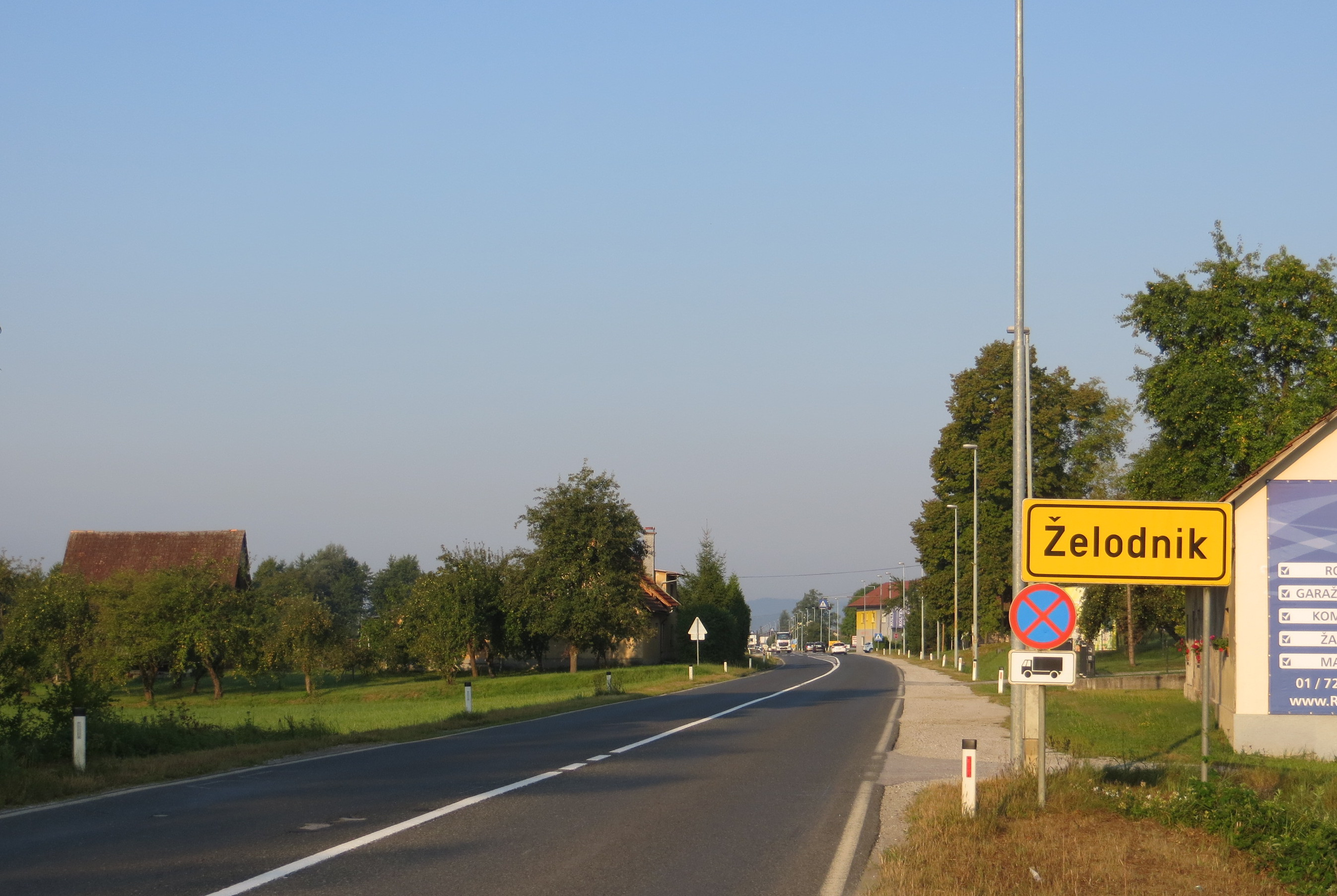

- Location in Slovenia
- Coordinates: 46°9′26.42″N 14°38′18.62″E
- Country: Slovenia
- Traditional region: Upper Carniola
- Statistical region: Central Slovenia
- Municipality: Domžale

Area
  - Total: 0.51 km^{2} (0.20 sq mi)
- Elevation: 310.7 m (1,019 ft)

Population (2020)
  - Total: 45
  - Density: 88/km^{2} (230/sq mi)

Želodnik (pronounced [ʒɛˈloːdnik]) is a small settlement northeast of Domžale in the Upper Carniola region of Slovenia.
