= Račni Vrh =

Račni Vrh Lačni Vrh (until 1946)
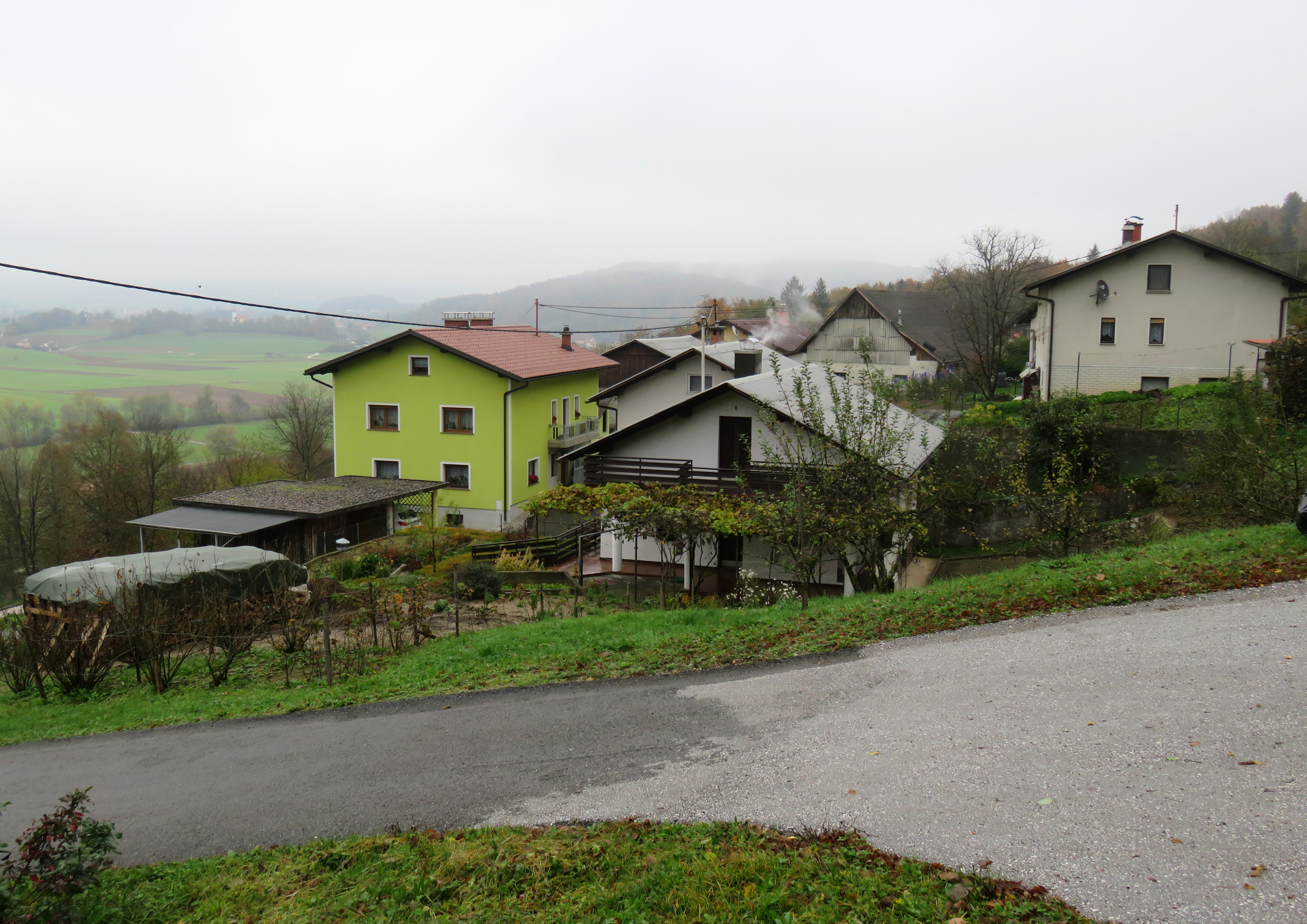

- Location in Slovenia
- Coordinates: 46°7′53.09″N 14°39′51.01″E
- Country: Slovenia
- Traditional region: Upper Carniola
- Statistical region: Central Slovenia
- Municipality: Domžale

Area
  - Total: 0.54 km^{2} (0.21 sq mi)
- Elevation: 370.2 m (1,215 ft)

Population (2020)
  - Total: 100
  - Density: 190/km^{2} (480/sq mi)

Račni Vrh (pronounced [ˈɾaːtʃni ˈʋəɾx]; until 1946 Lačni Vrh, German: Latschenberg) is a small dispersed settlement east of Domžale in the Upper Carniola region of Slovenia.

== Name ==
Račni Vrh was attested in historical sources as Raͤczenberg in 1436 and Ratzenberg in 1449, meaning 'Rača Hill' and corresponding to today's name Račni Vrh (literally, 'Rača Peak'). However, by the 19th century the settlement was known as Lačni Vrh (literally, 'Hungry Peak') in Slovene, with the corresponding German name Latschenberg. This name has been interpreted as referring to poverty among the residents in the hills or poor soil fertility, or as a corruption of Laški Vrh (literally, 'Italian Peak'), referring to early settlement. The name of the village was changed to Račni Vrh in 1946.
