= Dolenje, Domžale =

Dolenje
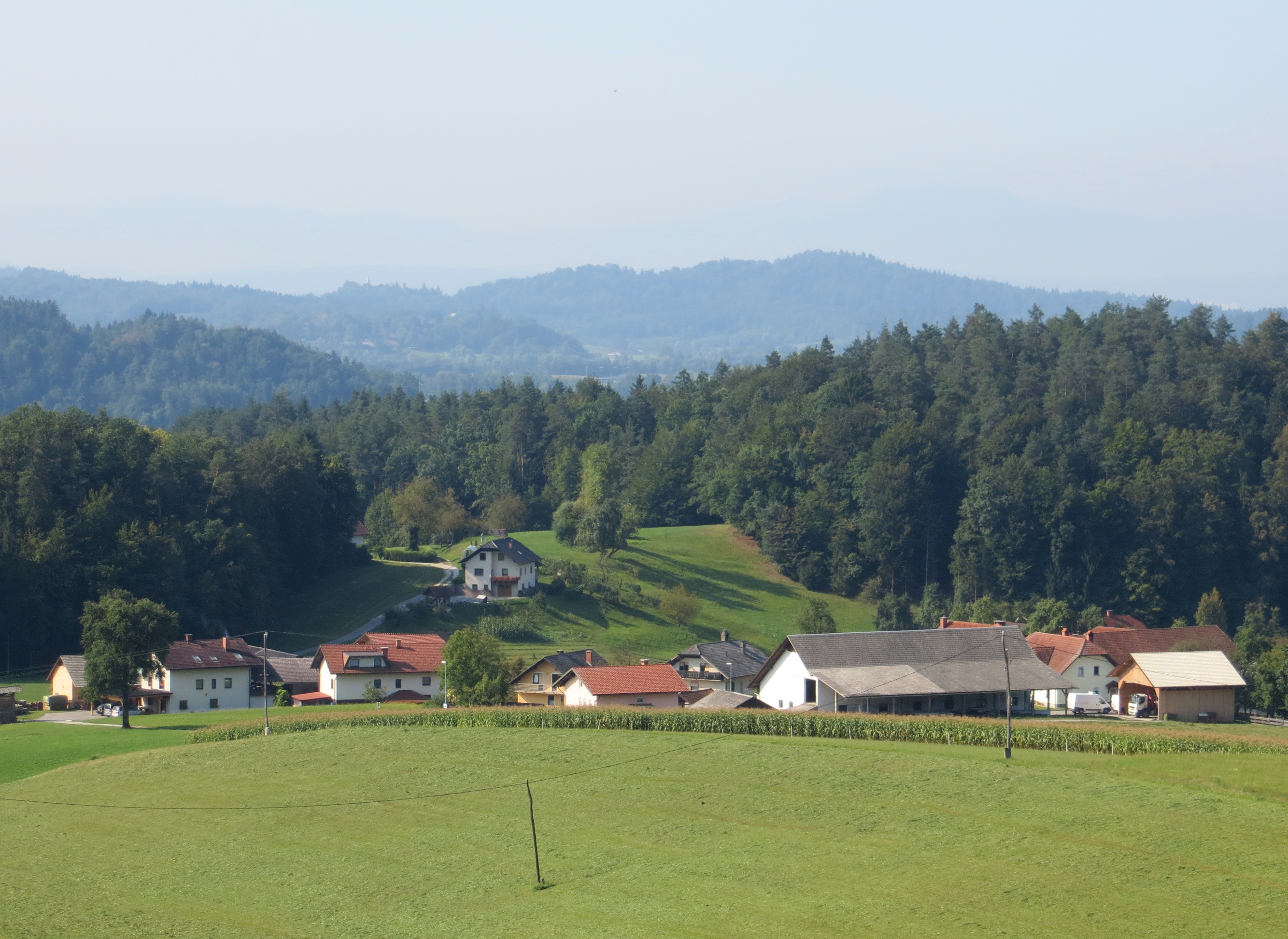

- Location in Slovenia
- Coordinates: 46°10′37.57″N 14°39′28.56″E
- Country: Slovenia
- Traditional region: Upper Carniola
- Statistical region: Central Slovenia
- Municipality: Domžale

Area
  - Total: 0.64 km^{2} (0.25 sq mi)
- Elevation: 350.7 m (1,151 ft)

Population (2020)
  - Total: 43
  - Density: 67/km^{2} (170/sq mi)

Dolenje (pronounced [dɔˈleːnjɛ]) is a small settlement in the Municipality of Domžale in the Upper Carniola region of Slovenia.
