= Brdo, Domžale =

Brdo
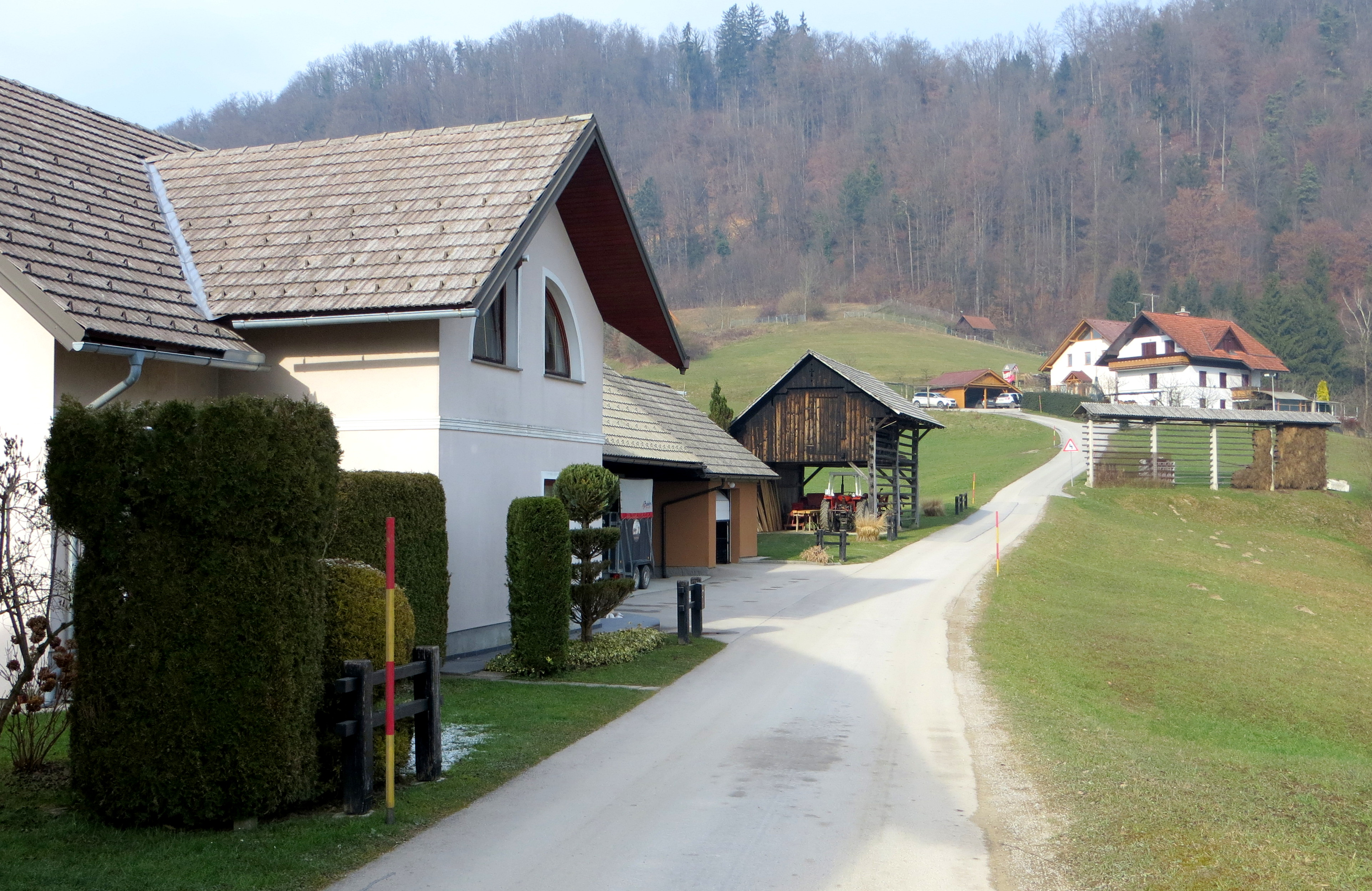

- Location in Slovenia
- Coordinates: 46°7′18.82″N 14°38′24.11″E
- Country: Slovenia
- Traditional region: Upper Carniola
- Statistical region: Central Slovenia
- Municipality: Domžale
- Elevation: 331.3 m (1,087 ft)

Population (2020)
  - Total: 104

Brdo (pronounced [ˈbəɾdɔ]) is a settlement in the Municipality of Domžale in the Upper Carniola region of Slovenia.

== Name ==
Brdo was attested in written sources as Ek in 1345 and Echk in 1410, among other spellings.

== Church ==
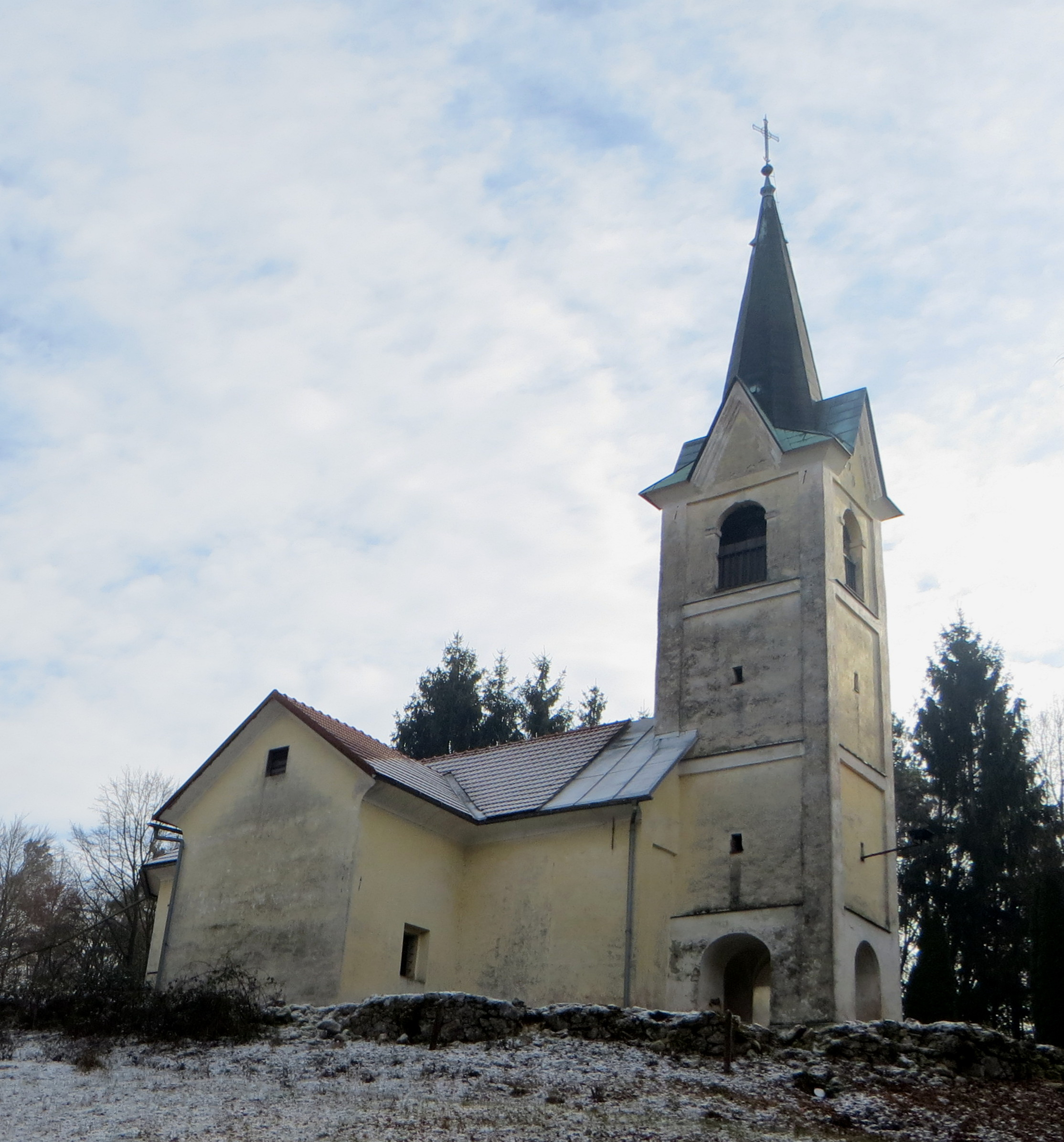
Saint Nicholas's Church

The church in Brdo is located above the hamlet of Goropeče. It is dedicated to the Saint Nicholas. It is a chapel of ease and belongs to the parish of Saint George in Ihan. The church is originally a Gothic single-nave church that was reworked in the Baroque style in 1750, when the bell tower and chapel were added. The sacristy dates from 1718. The rib-vaulted chancel dates to the 14th century and contains paintings by a student of the 15th-century master painter Bolfgang. The church has Renaissance and Baroque furnishings, and the main altar was created in 1669.
