= Oplotniščica =

River in Slovenia

Oplotniščica Oplotnica
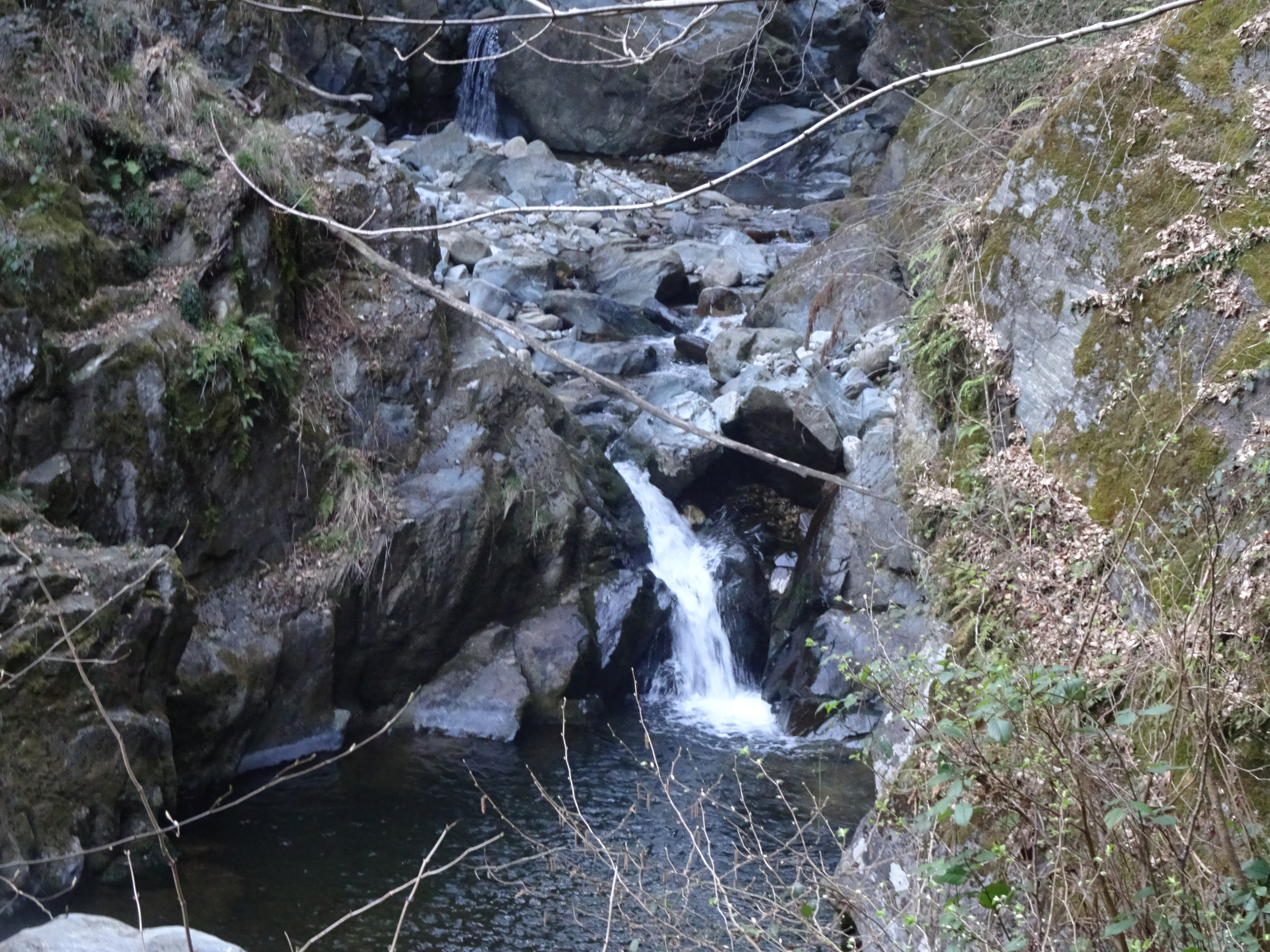

Location
- Country: Slovenia

Physical characteristics
- Source
  - location: Southern flank of the Pohorje Massif, near Rogla
- Mouth
  - location: Dravinja
  - coordinates: 46°19′22″N 15°29′28″E
- Length: 28 km (17 mi)
- Basin size: 52 km^{2} (20 sq mi)
- Discharge
  - average: 1.2 m^{3} (42 cu ft)/s

Basin features
- Progression: Dravinja→ Drava→ Danube→ Black Sea

The Oplotniščica (or Oplotnica) is a 28 km river in northeastern Slovenia. Rising on the southern flank of the Pohorje massif near the winter sports centre of Rogla, it flows southeast through the settlements of Osankarica, Oplotnica, and Tepanje before joining the Dravinja just northwest of Žiče. Despite draining a catchment of barely 52 km^{2}, the watercourse once powered dozens of sawmills and grain mills, and it continues to host a string of small (< 1.4 MW) hydroelectric plants.

== Course ==
From springs just below the 1,510 m contour on Rogla, the river descends steeply through granodiorite and quartz diorite gorges. Two short, forested headwater streams—Lukanja Creek (Slovene: Lukanjski potok) and Javor Creek (Slovene: Javorski potok)—converge near the village of Cezlak, where a historic quarry once supplied decorative stone to Vienna. Below Oplotnica the channel widens across fluvioglacial sands and gravels before meeting the Dravinja at roughly 290 m above sea level. A gauging station at Perovec (operational since 2017) records an average discharge close to 1.2 m^{3} s^{−1}.

== Catchment and hydrology ==
The drainage basin straddles the contact between high-grade metamorphic basement (gneiss and mica schist) and an Early Miocene granodioritic intrusion. Because carbonate strata are virtually absent, the river's chemistry is controlled by weathering of feldspars and mafic minerals rather than by limestone dissolution. Waters are dilute (electrical conductivity mostly < 90 μS cm^{−1}) and display a characteristic ordering of ions: Na^{+} > Ca^{2+} > Mg^{2+} > K^{+}, with HCO_{3}^{−} dominating the anion budget. Partial pressures of dissolved CO_{2} range from 1.1 to 13.4 times the atmospheric value, indicating that the river is a modest net source of CO_{2} to the atmosphere. Normalised bicarbonate production (about 10.4 mmol l^{−1} km^{−2} s^{−1}) is typical of small silicate basins in temperate Europe, and considerably lower than figures reported from nearby carbonate catchments.

== Ecology and conservation ==
Above the village of Cezlak the channel and its riparian slopes lie within the Pohorje Natura 2000 site. Mixed montane woods of Norway spruce (Picea abies) and European beech (Fagus sylvatica) dominate, supporting a cool-water fauna that includes brown trout, brook lamprey, and white-clawed crayfish. Continuous forest cover, steep gradients and a sequence of small check-dams have limited sediment delivery to the lower valley, helping to maintain clear water and a naturally irregular flow regime.

== Human history ==
Archival records show that more than thirty water-powered sawmills and grist mills operated along the upper course in the nineteenth century. A narrow-gauge industrial railway once linked a Cezlak granite quarry to Oplotnica, drawing power from a dedicated hydroelectric station on one of the tributaries. Today four run-of-river plants remain in service, each with a capacity of 0.7 to 1.4 MW, while the broader valley floor is used for small-scale agriculture and tourism.

== Gallery ==
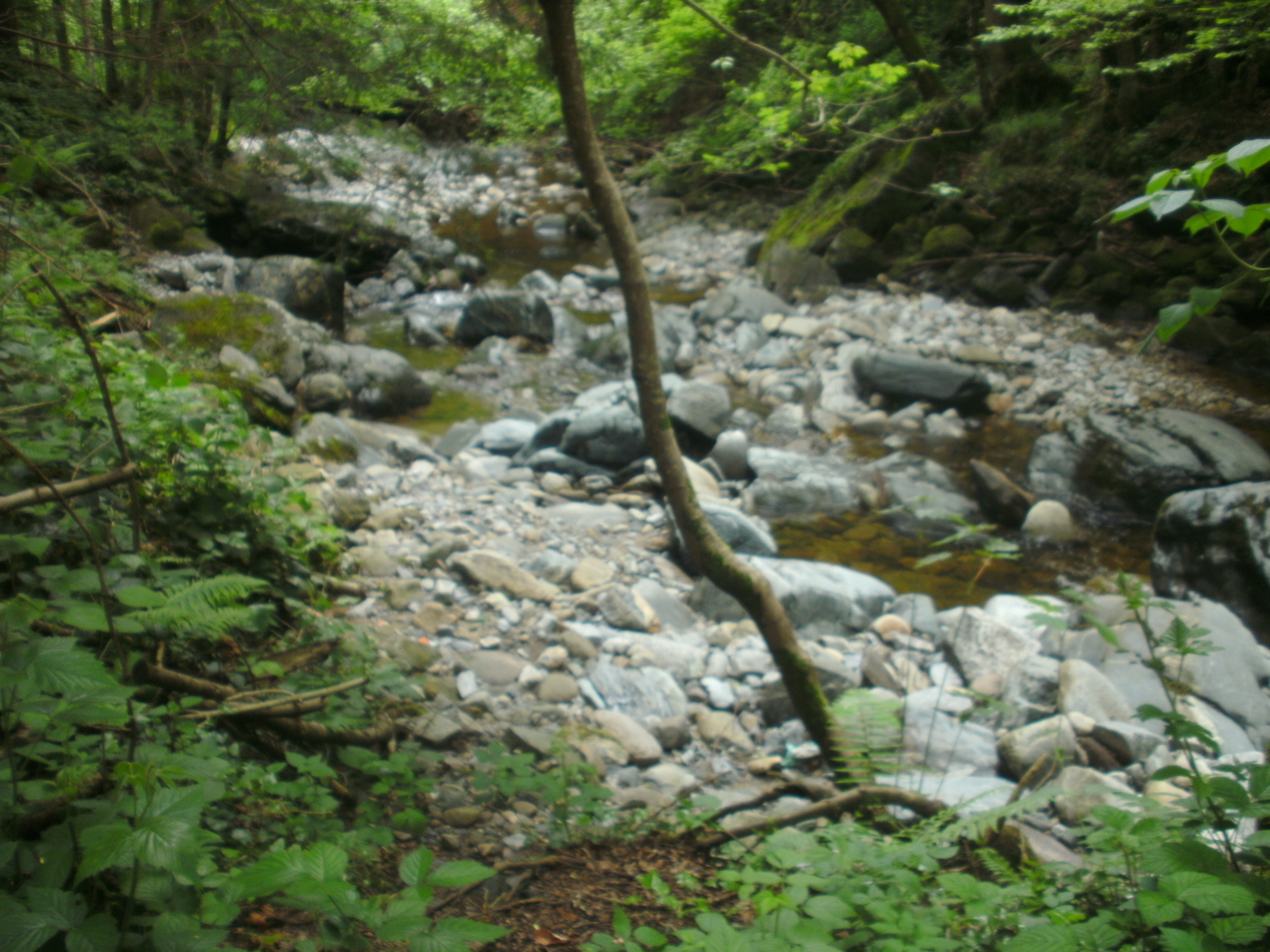
Oplotnica Gorge

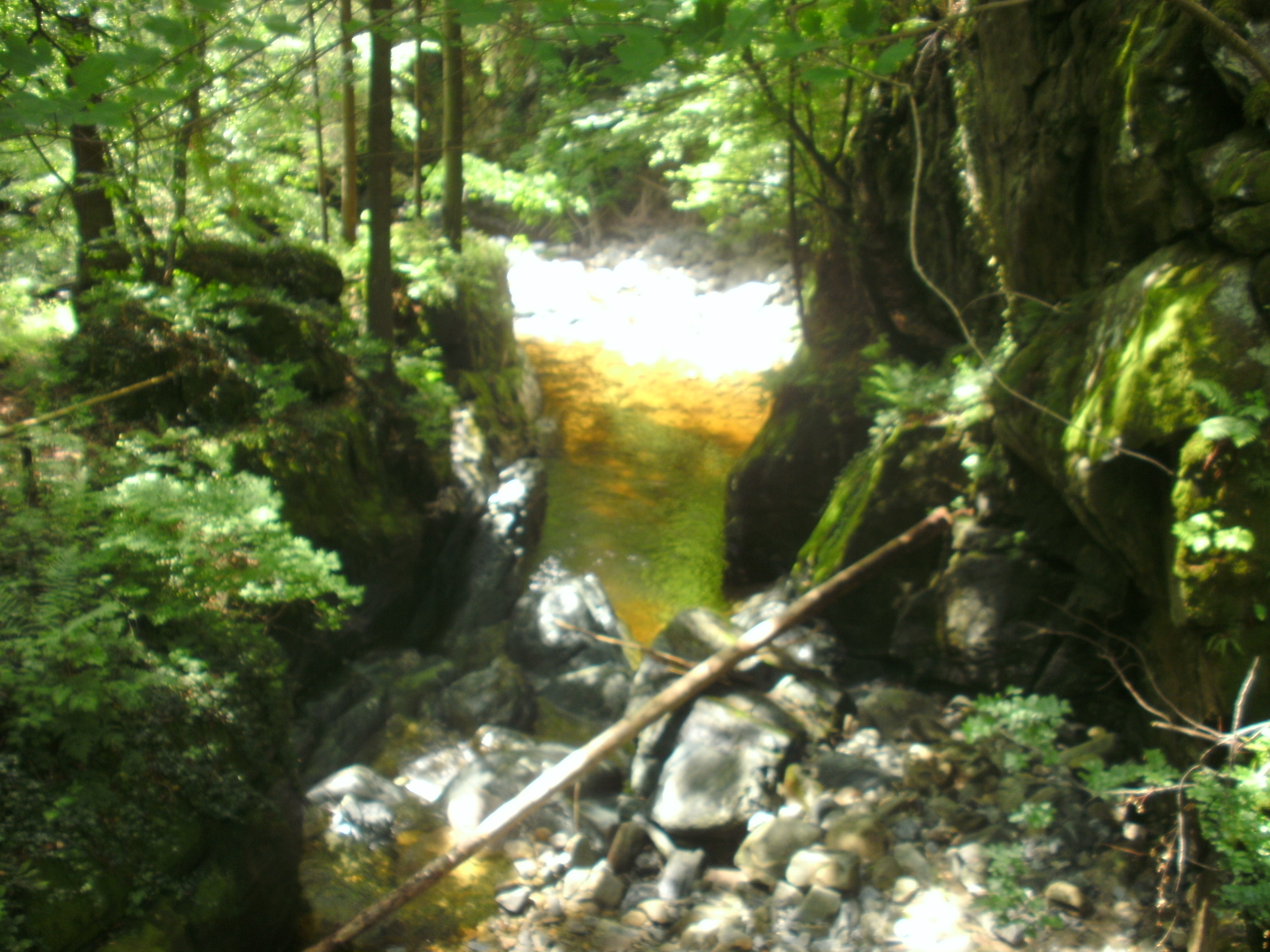

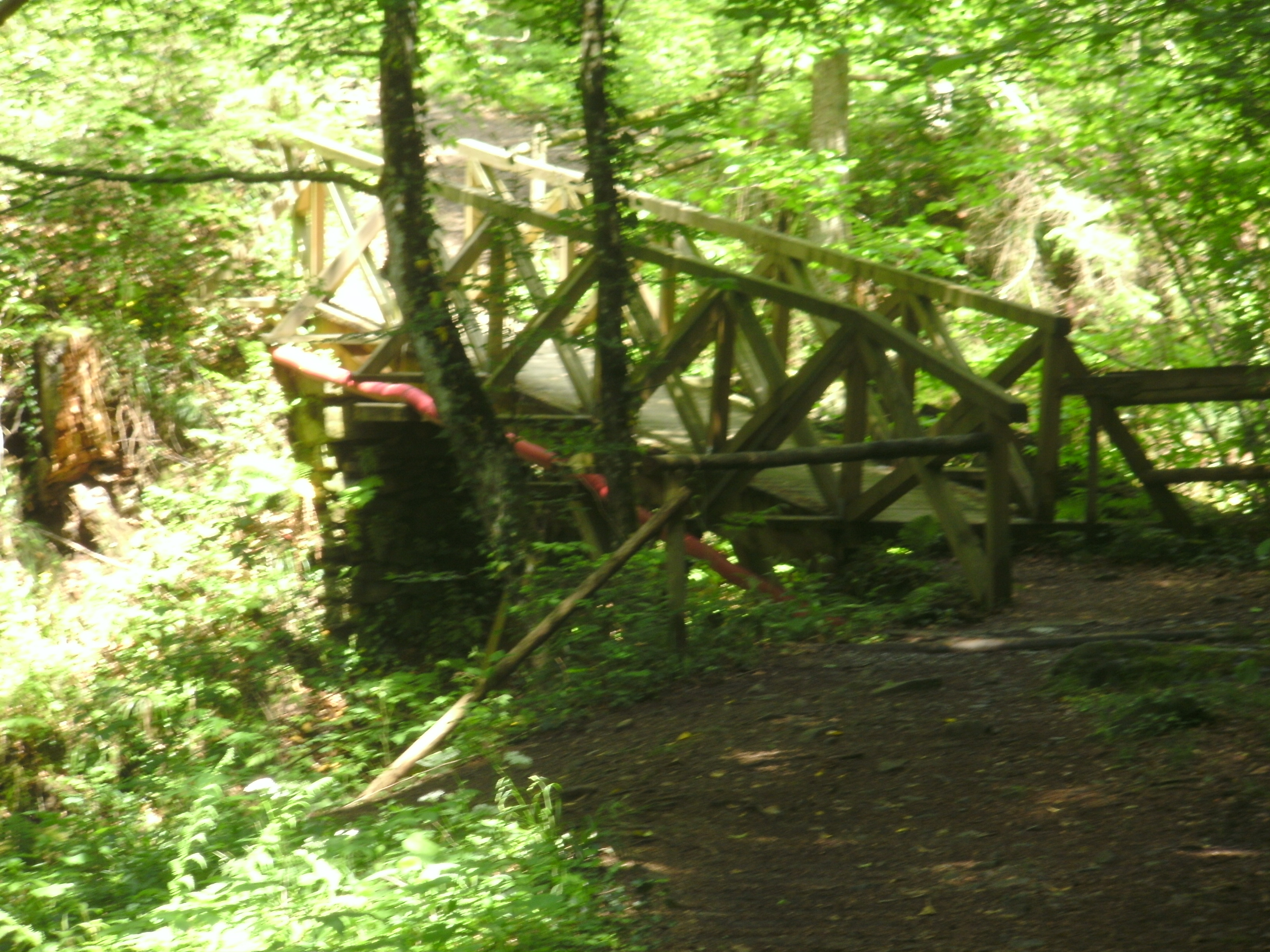

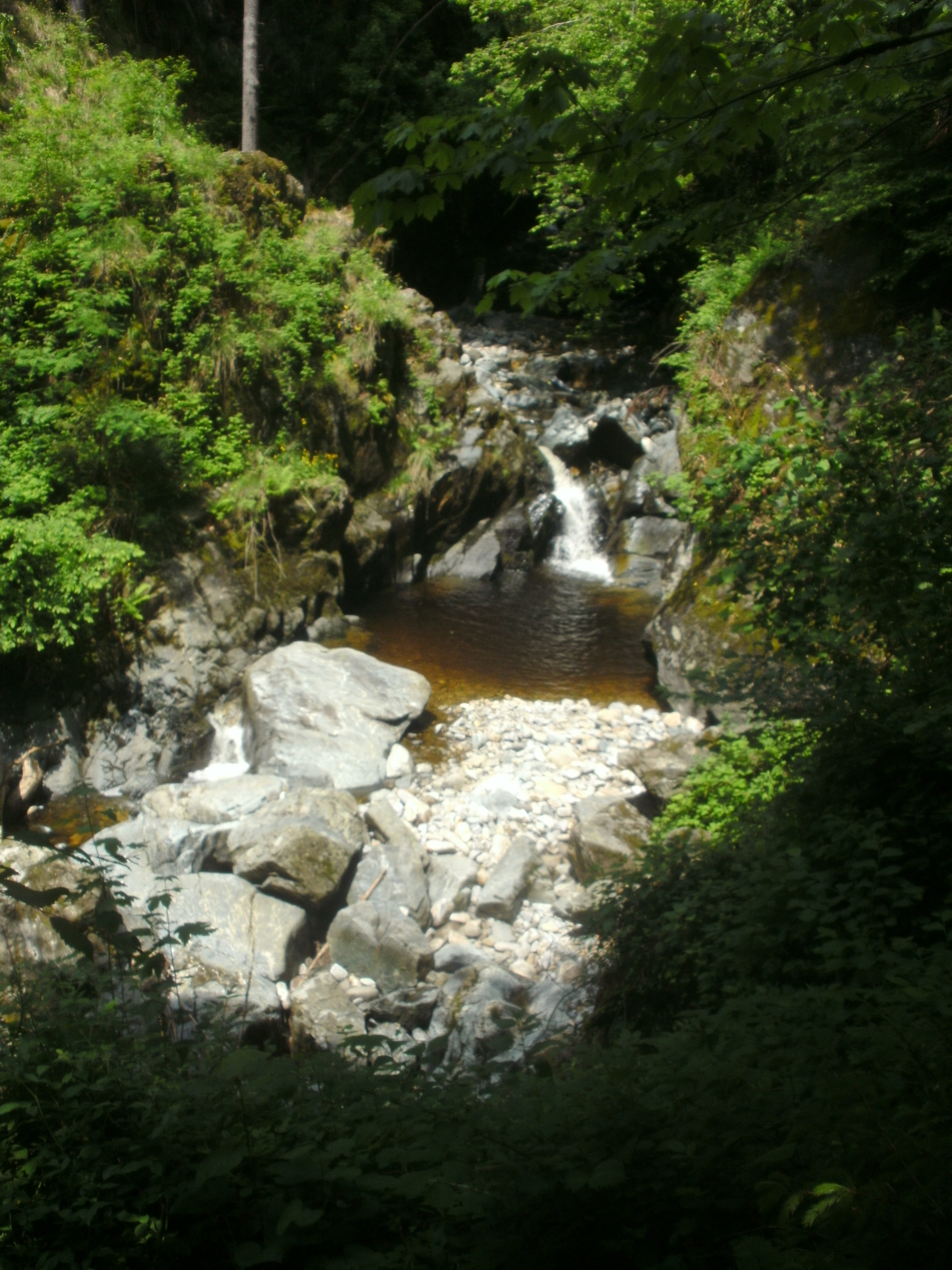
