= Pristava =

Pristava (in Slovenian originally) is a detached economic (farming) unit of an estate or manor, It may refer to:

== Slovenia ==
- Cvetkovci, a village in the Municipality of Ormož, formerly known as Pristava
- Mala Pristava, Pivka, a settlement in the Municipality of Pivka
- Pristava, Borovnica, a settlement in the Municipality of Borovnica
- Pristava, Cirkulane, a settlement in the Municipality of Cirkulane
- Pristava, Ljutomer, a settlement in the Municipality of Ljutomer
- Pristava nad Stično, a settlement in the Municipality of Ivančna Gorica
- Pristava, Nova Gorica (also known as Rafut), one of the four suburbs of the town of Nova Gorica in the Gorizia region of western Slovenia
- Pristava, Novo Mesto, a village in southeastern Slovenia, in the Municipality of Novo Mesto
- Pristava ob Krki, a settlement in the Municipality of Krško
- Pristava pri Lesičnem, a settlement in the Municipality of Podčetrtek
- Pristava pri Leskovcu, a settlement in the Municipality of Krško
- Pristava pri Mestinju, a settlement in the Municipality of Podčetrtek
- Pristava, Sežana, a settlement in the Municipality of Sežana
- Pristava, Tržič, a settlement in the Municipality of Tržič
- Spodnja Pristava, a settlement in the Municipality of Slovenske Konjice
- Velika Pristava, a settlement in the Municipality of Pivka
- Zgornja Pristava, Slovenske Konjice, a settlement in the Municipality of Slovenske Konjice
- Zgornja Pristava, Videm, a settlement in the Municipality of Videm
- Pristava House, a manor house near Jesenice

== Croatia ==
- Pristava, Tuhelj, a village near Tuhelj, Krapina-Zagorje County
- Pristava Krapinska, a village near Krapina, Krapina-Zagorje County
