= Mlače =

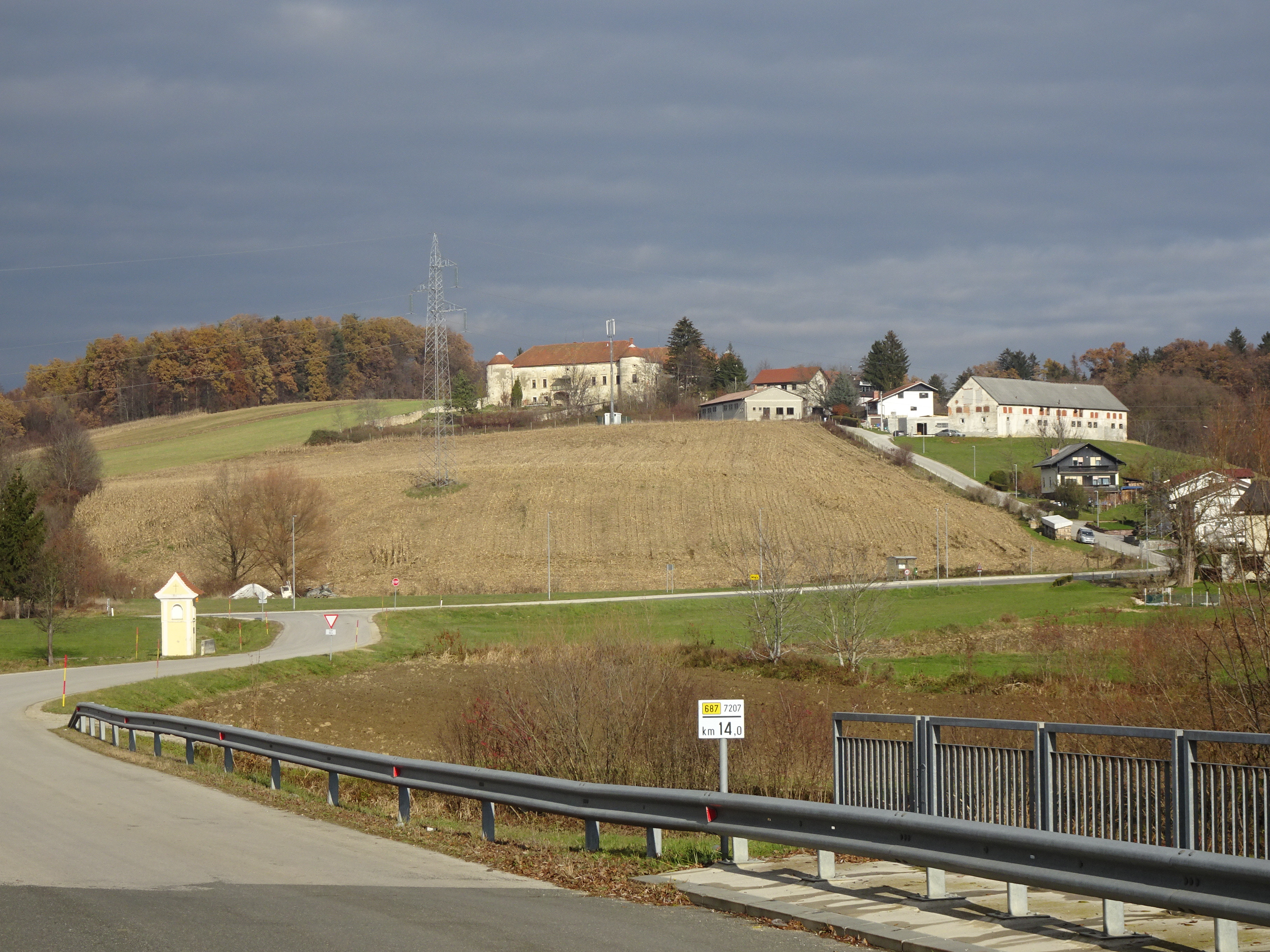

- Location in Slovenia
- Coordinates: 46°18′14.27″N 15°30′30.17″E
- Country: Slovenia
- Traditional region: Styria
- Statistical region: Savinja
- Municipality: Slovenske Konjice

Area
  - Total: 1.21 km^{2} (0.47 sq mi)
- Elevation: 308.4 m (1,012 ft)

Population (2002)
  - Total: 234

Mlače (pronounced [ˈmlaːtʃɛ]) is a settlement on the left bank of the Dravinja River east of Loče in the Municipality of Slovenske Konjice in eastern Slovenia. The entire municipality is part of the traditional region of Styria and is now included in the Savinja Statistical Region.

There is an early 17th-century mansion with an arcaded courtyard in the settlement.
