= Podpeč ob Dravinji =

- Location in Slovenia
- Coordinates: 46°17′41.68″N 15°32′23.89″E
- Country: Slovenia
- Traditional region: Styria
- Statistical region: Savinja
- Municipality: Slovenske Konjice

Area
  - Total: 1.32 km^{2} (0.51 sq mi)
- Elevation: 283.4 m (930 ft)

Population (2002)
  - Total: 33

Podpeč ob Dravinji (pronounced [pɔtˈpeːtʃ ɔb dɾaˈʋiːnji]) is a settlement in the Municipality of Slovenske Konjice in eastern Slovenia. It lies on the right bank of the Dravinja River east of Loče under the northern slopes of Mount Ljubično (Slovene: Ljubična gora). The area is part of the traditional region of Styria. The municipality is now included in the Savinja Statistical Region.

== Name ==
The name of the settlement was changed from Podpeč to Podpeč ob Dravinji in 1953.
