= Mali Breg =

Mali Breg Breg (until 1953)
- Location in Slovenia
- Coordinates: 46°18′42.62″N 15°29′51.64″E
- Country: Slovenia
- Traditional region: Styria
- Statistical region: Savinja
- Municipality: Slovenske Konjice

Area
  - Total: 0.48 km^{2} (0.19 sq mi)
- Elevation: 280.8 m (921 ft)

Population (2002)
  - Total: 58

Mali Breg (pronounced [ˈmaːli ˈbɾeːk]) is a settlement in the Municipality of Slovenske Konjice in eastern Slovenia. It lies on the Dravinja River north of Loče. The municipality is part of the traditional region of Styria and is now included in the Savinja Statistical Region.

== Name ==
The name of the settlement was changed from Breg to Mali Breg in 1953.
