= Klokočovnik =

- Location in Slovenia
- Coordinates: 46°18′3.36″N 15°28′51.47″E
- Country: Slovenia
- Traditional region: Styria
- Statistical region: Savinja
- Municipality: Slovenske Konjice

Area
  - Total: 2.97 km^{2} (1.15 sq mi)
- Elevation: 383.7 m (1,259 ft)

Population (2002)
  - Total: 139

Klokočovnik (pronounced [klɔkɔˈtʃoːu̯nik]) is a settlement in the Municipality of Slovenske Konjice in eastern Slovenia. It lies in the hills west of Loče on Loče Creek, a minor right tributary of the Dravinja River. The area is part of the traditional region of Styria. The municipality is now included in the Savinja Statistical Region.
