= Petelinjek pri Ločah =

- Location in Slovenia
- Coordinates: 46°20′1.21″N 15°31′29.15″E
- Country: Slovenia
- Traditional region: Styria
- Statistical region: Savinja
- Municipality: Slovenske Konjice

Area
  - Total: 1.08 km^{2} (0.42 sq mi)
- Elevation: 316.9 m (1,040 ft)

Population (2002)
  - Total: 40

Petelinjek pri Ločah (pronounced [pɛtɛˈliːnjɛk pɾi ˈloːtʃax]) is a dispersed settlement in the Municipality of Slovenske Konjice in eastern Slovenia. It lies in the hills north of Loče on the left bank of the Dravinja River. The area is part of the traditional region of Styria. The municipality is now included in the Savinja Statistical Region.

== Name ==
The name of the settlement was changed from Petelinjek to Petelinjek pri Ločah in 1999.
