= Brezje pri Ločah =

- Location in Slovenia
- Coordinates: 46°20′11.62″N 15°30′6.48″E
- Country: Slovenia
- Traditional region: Styria
- Statistical region: Savinja
- Municipality: Slovenske Konjice

Area
  - Total: 1.24 km^{2} (0.48 sq mi)
- Elevation: 297.7 m (977 ft)

Population (2002)
  - Total: 114

Brezje pri Ločah (pronounced [ˈbreːzjɛ pɾi ˈloːtʃax]) is a settlement in the Municipality of Slovenske Konjice in eastern Slovenia. It lies on the edge of the Dravinja Valley east of Slovenske Konjice and north of Loče. The area is part of the traditional Styria region. The municipality is included in the Savinja Statistical Region.

== Name ==
The name of the settlement was changed from Brezje to Brezje pri Ločah in 1953.
