= Penoje =

- Location in Slovenia
- Coordinates: 46°18′3.08″N 15°29′56.42″E
- Country: Slovenia
- Traditional region: Styria
- Statistical region: Savinja
- Municipality: Slovenske Konjice

Area
  - Total: 0.57 km^{2} (0.22 sq mi)
- Elevation: 268.9 m (882 ft)

Population (2002)
  - Total: 41

Penoje (pronounced [pɛˈnoːjɛ]) is a settlement on the right bank of the Dravinja River southeast of Loče in the Municipality of Slovenske Konjice in eastern Slovenia. The area is part of the traditional region of Styria and is now included in the Savinja Statistical Region.
