= Koble, Slovenske Konjice =

Koble
- Location in Slovenia
- Coordinates: 46°18′57.12″N 15°30′9.07″E
- Country: Slovenia
- Traditional region: Styria
- Statistical region: Savinja
- Municipality: Slovenske Konjice

Area
  - Total: 1.2 km^{2} (0.46 sq mi)
- Elevation: 286.7 m (941 ft)

Population (2002)
  - Total: 99

Koble (pronounced [ˈkoːblɛ]) is a small village north of Loče in the Municipality of Slovenske Konjice in eastern Slovenia. The area is part of the traditional region of Styria and is now included in the Savinja Statistical Region of Slovenia.
