= Kolačno, Slovenske Konjice =

Kolačno
- Location in Slovenia
- Coordinates: 46°19′27.26″N 15°30′4.2″E
- Country: Slovenia
- Traditional region: Styria
- Statistical region: Savinja
- Municipality: Slovenske Konjice

Area
  - Total: 0.99 km^{2} (0.38 sq mi)
- Elevation: 314.8 m (1,033 ft)

Population (2002)
  - Total: 40

Kolačno (pronounced [kɔˈlaːtʃnɔ]) is a small settlement in the Municipality of Slovenske Konjice in eastern Slovenia. It lies in the hills north of Loče and is part of the traditional region of Styria. The municipality is now included in the Savinja Statistical Region.
