= Municipality of Slovenske Konjice =

Municipality of Slovenia

Municipality of Slovenske Konjice Občina Slovenske Konjice
- Municipality
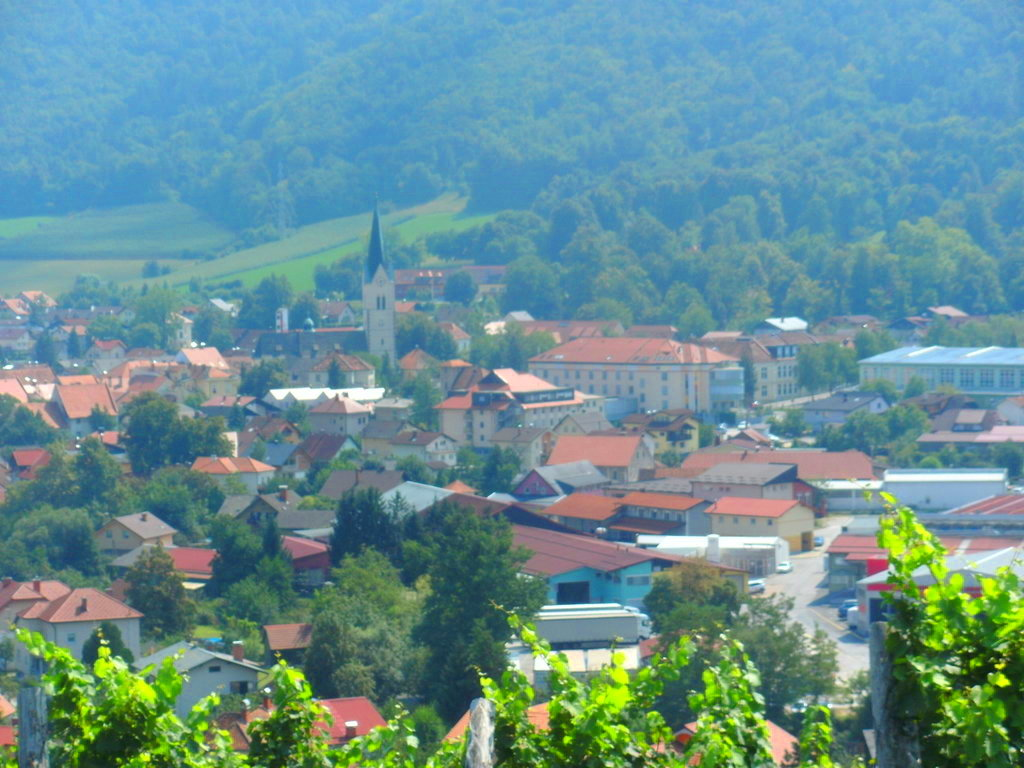

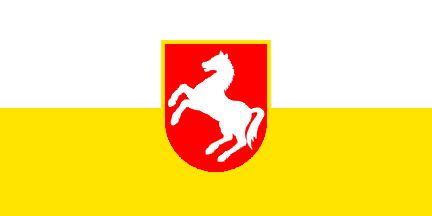
- Flag Coat of arms

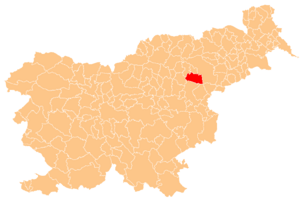
- Location of the Municipality of Slovenske Konjice in Slovenia
- Coordinates: 46°19′N 15°28′E
- Country: Slovenia

Government
  - Mayor: Darko Ratajc

Area
  - Total: 97.8 km^{2} (37.8 sq mi)

Population (2025)
  - Total: 15,515
  - Density: 159/km^{2} (411/sq mi)
- Time zone: UTC+01 (CET)
  - Summer (DST): UTC+02 (CEST)
- Website: www.slovenskekonjice.si

The Municipality of Slovenske Konjice (pronounced [slɔˈʋéːnskɛ kɔˈnjìːtsɛ] or [- kɔˈnjíːtsɛ]; Slovene: Občina Slovenske Konjice) is a municipality in the traditional region of Styria in northeastern Slovenia. The seat of the municipality is the town of Slovenske Konjice. Slovenske Konjice became a municipality in 1994.

Slovenske Konjice and the neighboring municipalities in the region

== Geography ==
The municipality is now included in the Savinja Statistical Region. It is the administrative and cultural center of the Dravinja Valley. It spreads over 97.8 square kilometers (37.8 sq mi) and has a population of 15.515. About 100 kilometers (62 mi) from Ljubljana, Graz, or Zagreb, it is easily reachable by the A1 motorway and via the small airport Slovenske Konjice near Loče.

=== Location ===
Municipality of Slovenske Konjice borders on the municipalities of Šentjur to the south, Vojnik to the west, Zreče to the northwest, Oplotnica to the north, Slovenska Bistrica to the east, and Šmarje pri Jelšah to the southeast.

== Settlements ==
In addition to the municipal seat of Slovenske Konjice, the municipality also includes the following settlements:

- Bezina
- Blato
- Brdo
- Breg pri Konjicah
- Brezje pri Ločah
- Dobrava pri Konjicah
- Dobrnež
- Draža Vas
- Gabrovlje
- Gabrovnik
- Kamna Gora
- Klokočovnik
- Koble
- Kolačno
- Konjiška Vas
- Kraberk
- Ličenca
- Lipoglav
- Loče
- Mali Breg
- Mlače
- Nova Vas pri Konjicah
- Novo Tepanje
- Ostrožno pri Ločah
- Penoje
- Perovec
- Petelinjek pri Ločah
- Podob
- Podpeč ob Dravinji
- Polene
- Preloge pri Konjicah
- Prežigal
- Selski Vrh
- Škalce
- Škedenj
- Sojek
- Špitalič pri Slovenskih Konjicah
- Spodnja Pristava
- Spodnje Grušovje
- Spodnje Laže
- Spodnje Preloge
- Spodnji Jernej
- Štajerska Vas
- Stare Slemene
- Strtenik
- Suhadol
- Sveti Jernej
- Tepanje
- Tepanjski Vrh
- Tolsti Vrh
- Vešenik
- Zbelovo
- Zbelovska Gora
- Zeče
- Zgornja Pristava
- Zgornje Laže
- Žiče

== Administrative division ==
The municipality of Slovenske Konjice comprises 16 local communities (Slovene singular: krajevna skupnost):

- Bezina (population: 896)
- Dobrava - Gabrovlje (population: 142)
- Draža vas (population: 516)
- Konjiška vas (population: 532)
- Loče (population: 1,774)
- Polene (population: 241)
- Slovenske Konjice (population: 6,038)
- Sojek - Kamna Gora (population: 216)
- Spodnje Grušovje (population: 180)
- Sveti Jernej (population: 808)
- Špitalič (population: 350)
- Tepanje (population: 929)
- Vešenik - Brdo (population: 591)
- Zbelovo (population: 766)
- Zeče (population: 898)
- Žiče (population: 638)
