= Kraberk =

- Location in Slovenia
- Coordinates: 46°17′54.85″N 15°26′33.07″E
- Country: Slovenia
- Traditional region: Styria
- Statistical region: Savinja
- Municipality: Slovenske Konjice

Area
  - Total: 1.66 km^{2} (0.64 sq mi)
- Elevation: 388.5 m (1,275 ft)

Population (2002)
  - Total: 56

Kraberk (pronounced [ˈkɾaːbɛɾk]) is a small dispersed settlement in the Municipality of Slovenske Konjice in eastern Slovenia. It lies in the hills west of Loče. The A1 Slovenian motorway runs through the settlement with the northern end of the Pletovarje Tunnel (745 m) and the southern end of the Škedenj I Viaduct (543 m) within its territory. The area is part of the traditional region of Styria. The municipality is now included in the Savinja Statistical Region.
