= Prežigal =

- Location in Slovenia
- Coordinates: 46°20′11.94″N 15°27′35.91″E
- Country: Slovenia
- Traditional region: Styria
- Statistical region: Savinja
- Municipality: Slovenske Konjice

Area
  - Total: 1.18 km^{2} (0.46 sq mi)
- Elevation: 296.1 m (971 ft)

Population (2002)
  - Total: 30

Prežigal (pronounced [ˈpɾeːʒiɡau̯]) is a small settlement in the Municipality of Slovenske Konjice in eastern Slovenia. It lies on the left bank of the Dravinja River east of Slovenske Konjice itself. The area is part of the traditional region of Styria. The municipality is now included in the Savinja Statistical Region.
