= Selski =

Selski, Selsky or Selški means rural in several Slavic languages and may refer to

- Spoken Macedonian language
- Selski Vrh, a settlement in Slovenia
- Rovte v Selški Dolini, a settlement in Slovenia
- Steve Selsky (born 1989), American baseball outfielder
