= Tepanjski Vrh =

- Location in Slovenia
- Coordinates: 46°20′46.64″N 15°27′23.1″E
- Country: Slovenia
- Traditional region: Styria
- Statistical region: Savinja
- Municipality: Slovenske Konjice

Area
  - Total: 0.43 km^{2} (0.17 sq mi)
- Elevation: 355.3 m (1,166 ft)

Population (2002)
  - Total: 126

Tepanjski Vrh (pronounced [ˈteːpanski ˈʋəɾx] German: Tepinaberg) is a settlement west of Tepanje in the Municipality of Slovenske Konjice in eastern Slovenia. The area is part of the traditional region of Styria and is now included in the Savinja Statistical Region.
