= Suhadol, Slovenske Konjice =

Suhadol
- Location in Slovenia
- Coordinates: 46°18′9.81″N 15°27′39.08″E
- Country: Slovenia
- Traditional region: Styria
- Statistical region: Savinja
- Municipality: Slovenske Konjice

Area
  - Total: 1.15 km^{2} (0.44 sq mi)
- Elevation: 429.7 m (1,410 ft)

Population (2002)
  - Total: 55

Suhadol (pronounced [suxaˈdoːu̯]) is a small dispersed settlement in the hills west of Loče in the Municipality of Slovenske Konjice in eastern Slovenia. The municipality is included in the Savinja Statistical Region and is part of the traditional region of Styria.
