= Lipoglav =

- Location in Slovenia
- Coordinates: 46°17′34.43″N 15°29′15.98″E
- Country: Slovenia
- Traditional region: Styria
- Statistical region: Savinja
- Municipality: Slovenske Konjice

Area
  - Total: 2.77 km^{2} (1.07 sq mi)
- Elevation: 356.8 m (1,171 ft)

Population (2002)
  - Total: 164

Lipoglav (pronounced [ˈliːpɔɡlau̯] or [lipɔˈɡlau̯]) is a settlement in the hills south of Loče in the Municipality of Slovenske Konjice in eastern Slovenia. The area is part of the traditional region of Styria. The entire Municipality of Slovenske Konjice is now included in the Savinja Statistical Region of Slovenia.
