= Ličenca =

- Location in Slovenia
- Coordinates: 46°20′40.03″N 15°31′40.28″E
- Country: Slovenia
- Traditional region: Styria
- Statistical region: Savinja
- Municipality: Slovenske Konjice

Area
  - Total: 3.41 km^{2} (1.32 sq mi)
- Elevation: 284.2 m (932 ft)

Population (2002)
  - Total: 200

Ličenca (pronounced [ˈliːtʃəntsa]) is a settlement in the Municipality of Slovenske Konjice in eastern Slovenia. It lies in the hills north of Loče on the road to Levič and Žabljek. The area is part of the traditional Styria region and is included in the Savinja Statistical Region.
