= Štajerska Vas =

- Location in Slovenia
- Coordinates: 46°18′39.78″N 15°30′46.3″E
- Country: Slovenia
- Traditional region: Styria
- Statistical region: Savinja
- Municipality: Slovenske Konjice

Area
  - Total: 0.22 km^{2} (0.085 sq mi)
- Elevation: 283.9 m (931 ft)

Population (2014)
  - Total: 40
- Postal code: 3215 Loče

Štajerska Vas (pronounced [ˈʃtaːjɛɾska ˈʋaːs]; Slovene: Štajerska vas) is a small village in the Municipality of Slovenske Konjice in eastern Slovenia.

== Location ==
It lies immediately northeast of Loče. The area is part of the traditional region of Styria and is now included in the Savinja Statistical Region. The settlement of Štajerska Vas was created in 1999, when it was administratively separated from Spodnji Jernej.

== Population ==
Following are 2007 population statistics for Štajerska Vas:

Population	44
Men	24
Women	20
Area	0.2 km^{2}
Population density	200/km^{2}
Number of families	11
Number of households	11
Average household size	4
Number of dwellings	13

Following is the population over time:

	2011	2012	2013	2014
Population	41	41	43	40
Men	19	19	19	16
Women	22	22	24	24
Population density (pop/km^{2})	187	187	196	182
