= Zbelovska Gora =

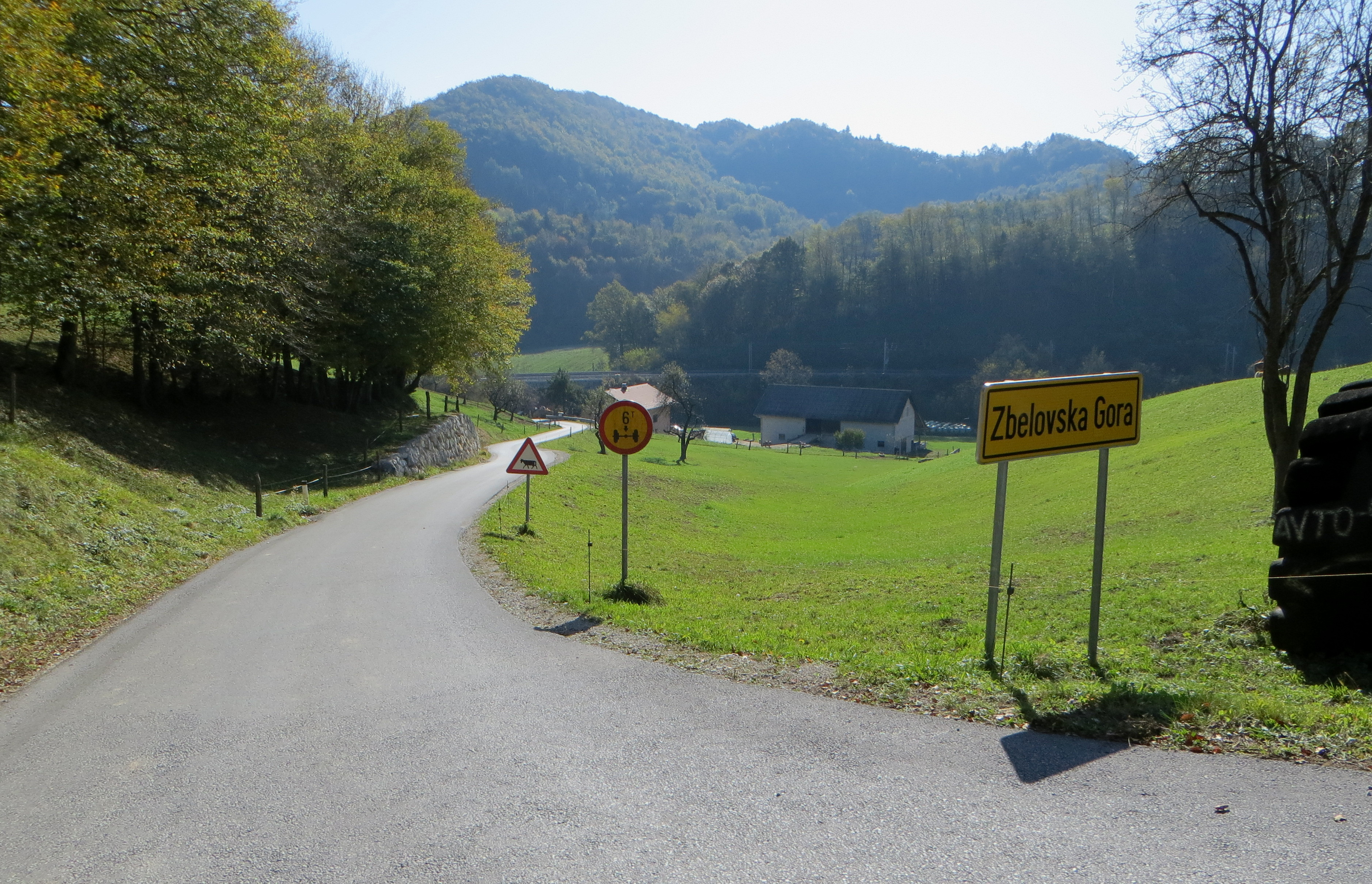

- Location in Slovenia
- Coordinates: 46°17′9.75″N 15°31′55.07″E
- Country: Slovenia
- Traditional region: Styria
- Statistical region: Savinja
- Municipality: Slovenske Konjice

Area
  - Total: 4.82 km^{2} (1.86 sq mi)
- Elevation: 283.2 m (929 ft)

Population (2002)
  - Total: 297

Zbelovska Gora (pronounced [ˈzbeːlɔu̯ska ˈɡɔːɾa]) is a settlement in the Municipality of Slovenske Konjice in eastern Slovenia. It lies in the hills above the right bank of the Dravinja River. The area is part of the traditional region of Styria. The municipality is now included in the Savinja Statistical Region.

== Zbelovo Castle ==
On a hill north of the settlement above the Dravinja are the ruins of a 12th-century castle known as Zbelovo Castle. It was first mentioned in written documents dating to the 13th century and was in ruins by the late 17th century.

== Church ==
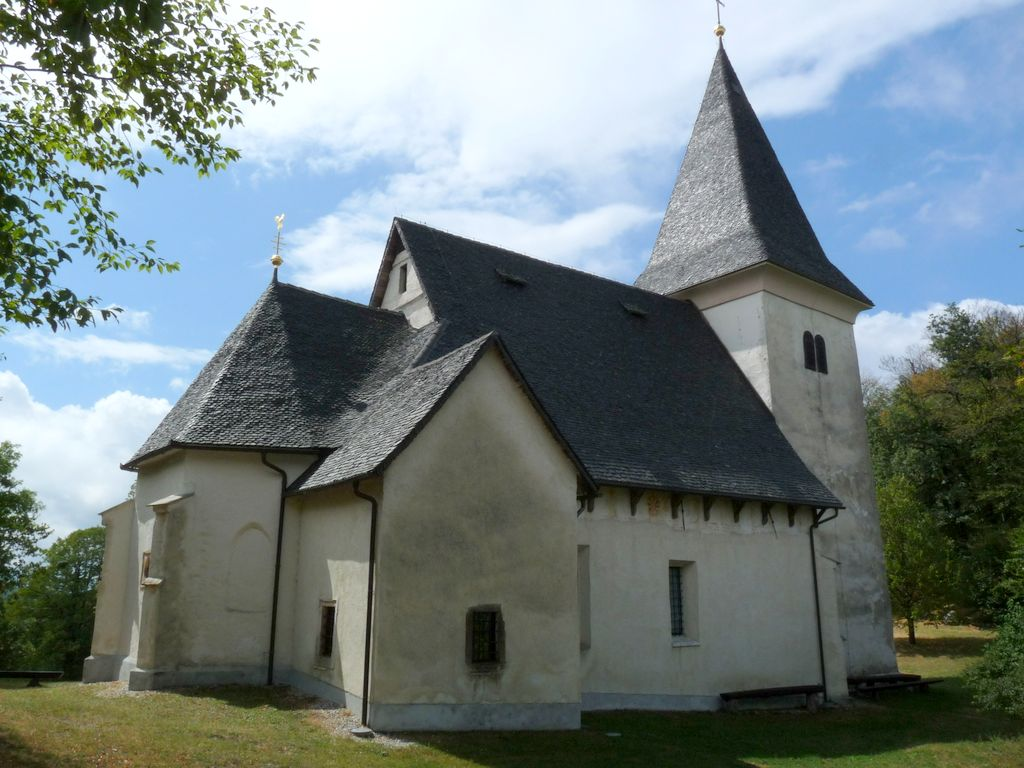
Mother of God Church at Mount Ljubično

A Gothic pilgrimage church of the Mother of God stands at Mount Ljubično (Slovene: Ljubična gora). It belongs to the Parish of Zreče and dates to the late 15th century, with a bell tower built in 1627. The interior furnishings are from the 18th century.
