= Spodnje Preloge =

- Location in Slovenia
- Coordinates: 46°20′42.79″N 15°24′22.54″E
- Country: Slovenia
- Traditional region: Styria
- Statistical region: Savinja
- Municipality: Slovenske Konjice

Area
  - Total: 0.61 km^{2} (0.24 sq mi)
- Elevation: 363.3 m (1,192 ft)

Population (2002)
  - Total: 213

Spodnje Preloge (pronounced [ˈspoːdnjɛ ˈpɾeːlɔɡɛ]) is a settlement in the Municipality of Slovenske Konjice in eastern Slovenia. It lies between Koprivnica and Polenščica creeks, right tributaries of the Dravinja River west of Slovenske Konjice. The area is part of the traditional region of Styria. The municipality is now included in the Savinja Statistical Region.
