= Novo Tepanje =

- Location in Slovenia
- Coordinates: 46°21′0.83″N 15°28′57.24″E
- Country: Slovenia
- Traditional region: Styria
- Statistical region: Savinja
- Municipality: Slovenske Konjice

Area
  - Total: 1.2 km^{2} (0.46 sq mi)
- Elevation: 292.1 m (958 ft)

Population (2002)
  - Total: 80

Novo Tepanje (pronounced [ˈnɔːʋɔ ˈteːpanjɛ]) is a settlement in the Municipality of Slovenske Konjice in eastern Slovenia. It lies on the regional road from Slovenske Konjice to Slovenska Bistrica on the left bank of Oplotnica Creek, a left tributary of the Dravinja River. The area is part of the traditional region of Styria. The municipality is now included in the Savinja Statistical Region.

== Mass graves ==
Novo Tepanje is the site of two known mass graves from the end of the Second World War and later. The Mirnik Woods Mass Grave (Slovene: Grobišče Mirnikov gozd) is located 1 kilometer (0.62 mi) north of the settlement, in a small woods between the Solar and Potočnik farms. The grave contains the remains of Gottschee Germans and Slovene civilians from Slovenske Konjice that were murdered at the end of the war and after the war. The Mirnik Woods 2 Mass Grave (Grobišče Mirnikov gozd 2) is located southeast of the first grave, 30 meters (98 ft) from the edge of the woods below a dead oak tree with peeling bark. It contains the remains of victims (probably Gottschee Germans) that were murdered in May 1945.
