= Gabrovlje =

- Location in Slovenia
- Coordinates: 46°21′28.35″N 15°24′53.75″E
- Country: Slovenia
- Traditional region: Styria
- Statistical region: Savinja
- Municipality: Slovenske Konjice

Area
  - Total: 0.38 km^{2} (0.15 sq mi)
- Elevation: 374.6 m (1,229 ft)

Population (2002)
  - Total: 83

Gabrovlje (pronounced [ɡaˈbɾoːu̯ljɛ]) is a settlement on the left bank of the Dravinja River north of Slovenske Konjice in eastern Slovenia. The area is part of the traditional region of Styria. The entire Municipality of Slovenske Konjice is now included in the Savinja Statistical Region of Slovenia.
