= Spodnji Jernej =

Spodnji Jernej Kravjek (until 1999)
- Location in Slovenia
- Coordinates: 46°18′42.62″N 15°31′4.56″E
- Country: Slovenia
- Traditional region: Styria
- Statistical region: Savinja
- Municipality: Slovenske Konjice

Area
  - Total: 0.57 km^{2} (0.22 sq mi)
- Elevation: 305.4 m (1,002 ft)

Population (2002)
  - Total: 28

Spodnji Jernej (pronounced [ˈspoːdnji ˈjɛːɾnɛi̯]) is a settlement in the hills northeast of Loče in the Municipality of Slovenske Konjice in eastern Slovenia. The area is part of the traditional region of Styria. The municipality is now included in the Savinja Statistical Region. In 1999 a part of the settlement was administratively separated to form the new settlement of Štajerska Vas.

== Name ==
In 1999, the settlement's name was changed from Kravjek to Spodnji Jernej. The name Kravjek (< krava 'cow') refers to a place where cows were raised, but is also a variant form of the word kravjak 'cow pie'. The name Spodnji Jernej (literally, 'lower (Saint) Bartholomew') refers to the village's elevation in comparison to neighboring Sveti Jernej, which lies about 40 meters (130 ft) higher.
