= Breg pri Konjicah =

- Location in Slovenia
- Coordinates: 46°19′59.82″N 15°26′48.58″E
- Country: Slovenia
- Traditional region: Styria
- Statistical region: Savinja
- Municipality: Slovenske Konjice

Area
  - Total: 1.27 km^{2} (0.49 sq mi)
- Elevation: 310 m (1,020 ft)

Population (2002)
  - Total: 132

Breg pri Konjicah (pronounced [ˈbɾeːk pɾi kɔˈnjiːtsax]) is a settlement in the Municipality of Slovenske Konjice in eastern Slovenia. It lies on the right bank of the Dravinja River just east of Slovenske Konjice itself. The area is part of the traditional region of Styria. The municipality is now included in the Savinja Statistical Region.

== Name ==
The name of the settlement was changed from Breg to Breg pri Konjicah in 1953.
