= Bezina =

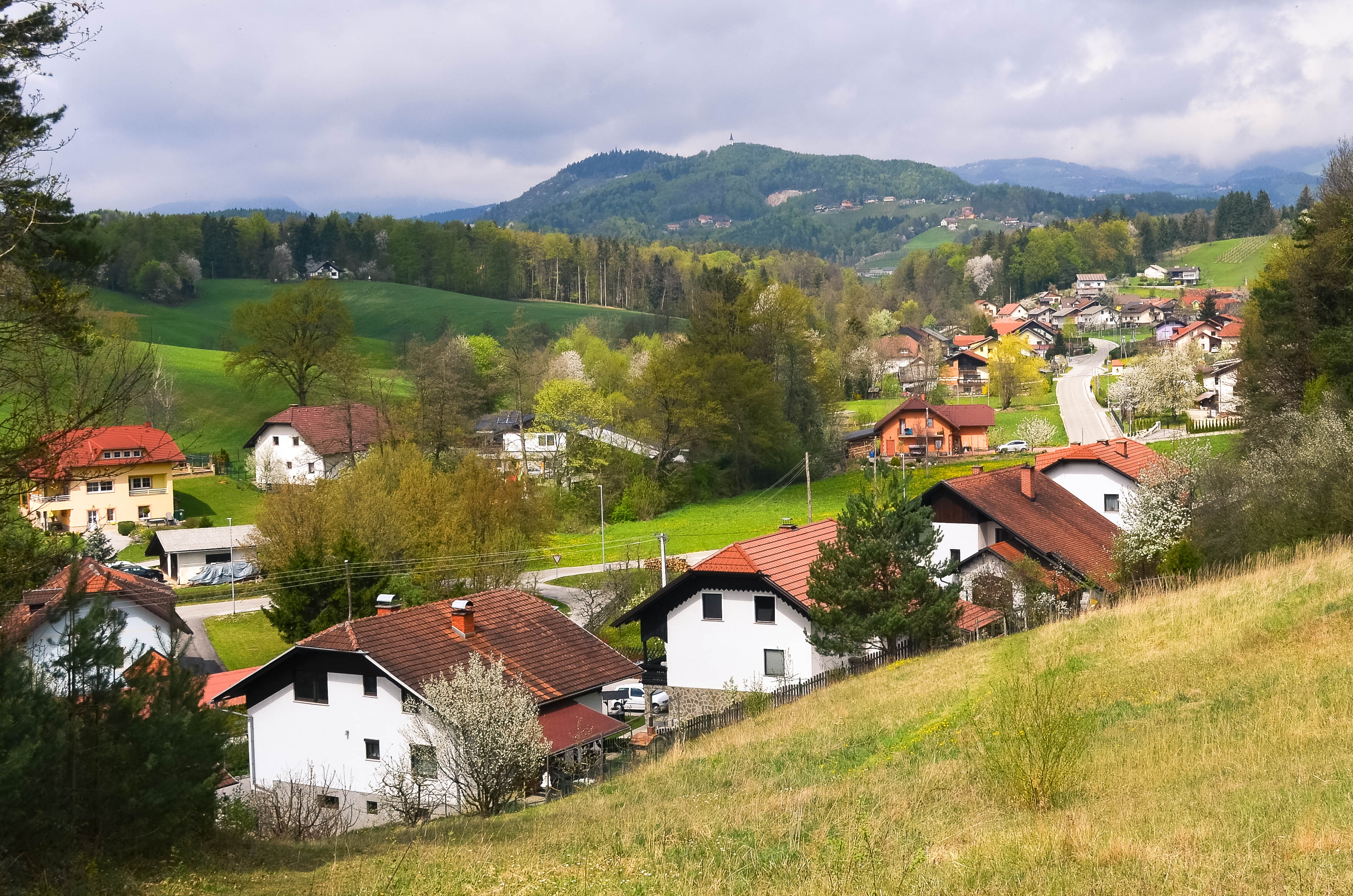

- Location in Slovenia
- Coordinates: 46°21′30.06″N 15°25′57.85″E
- Country: Slovenia
- Traditional region: Styria
- Statistical region: Savinja
- Municipality: Slovenske Konjice

Area
  - Total: 2.38 km^{2} (0.92 sq mi)
- Elevation: 344.2 m (1,129 ft)

Population (2002)
  - Total: 492

Bezina (pronounced [ˈbeːzina], German: Wesina) is a settlement in the Municipality of Slovenske Konjice in eastern Slovenia. It lies on the regional road leading north from Slovenske Konjice to Oplotnica. The area is part of the traditional region of Styria. The municipality is now included in the Savinja Statistical Region.

== Name ==
The name Bezina is derived from the Slavic common noun *bъzъ 'elder' (whence Slovene bezeg 'elder'), referring to the local vegetation. Similar names based on the same root are common in Slovenian ethnic territory (e.g., Bezgovica and Bezovice, and Basovizza in Italy) as well as in other Slavic areas (e.g., Bazje in Croatia, Bzová in the Czech Republic, etc.).
