= Zgornje Laže =

- Location in Slovenia
- Coordinates: 46°19′12.05″N 15°32′23.84″E
- Country: Slovenia
- Traditional region: Styria
- Statistical region: Savinja
- Municipality: Slovenske Konjice

Area
  - Total: 2.73 km^{2} (1.05 sq mi)
- Elevation: 280.5 m (920 ft)

Population (2002)
  - Total: 131

Zgornje Laže (pronounced [ˈzɡoːɾnjɛ ˈlaːʒɛ]) is a small settlement in the Municipality of Slovenske Konjice in eastern Slovenia. It lies in the hills north of Spodnje Laže. The area is part of the traditional region of Styria. The entire municipality is now included in the Savinja Statistical Region.
