= Spodnja Pristava =

- Location in Slovenia
- Coordinates: 46°19′31.57″N 15°28′24.33″E
- Country: Slovenia
- Traditional region: Styria
- Statistical region: Savinja
- Municipality: Slovenske Konjice

Area
  - Total: 0.17 km^{2} (0.066 sq mi)
- Elevation: 295.9 m (971 ft)

Population (2002)
  - Total: 32

Spodnja Pristava (pronounced [ˈspoːdnja ˈpɾiːstaʋa]) is a small settlement in the Municipality of Slovenske Konjice in eastern Slovenia. It lies on the right bank of the Dravinja River just west of Draža Vas. The area is part of the traditional region of Styria and is now included in the Savinja Statistical Region.
