= Tolsti Vrh, Slovenske Konjice =

Tolsti Vrh
- Location in Slovenia
- Coordinates: 46°18′32.99″N 15°25′29.11″E
- Country: Slovenia
- Traditional region: Styria
- Statistical region: Savinja
- Municipality: Slovenske Konjice

Area
  - Total: 3.15 km^{2} (1.22 sq mi)
- Elevation: 453.9 m (1,489 ft)

Population (2002)
  - Total: 100

Tolsti Vrh (pronounced [ˈtoːu̯sti ˈʋəɾx]) is a settlement in the Municipality of Slovenske Konjice in eastern Slovenia. It lies on the southern slopes of the Mount Konjice (Slovene: Konjiška gora) hills south of the town of Slovenske Konjice. The area is part of the traditional region of Styria. The municipality is now included in the Savinja Statistical Region.
