= Spodnje Grušovje =

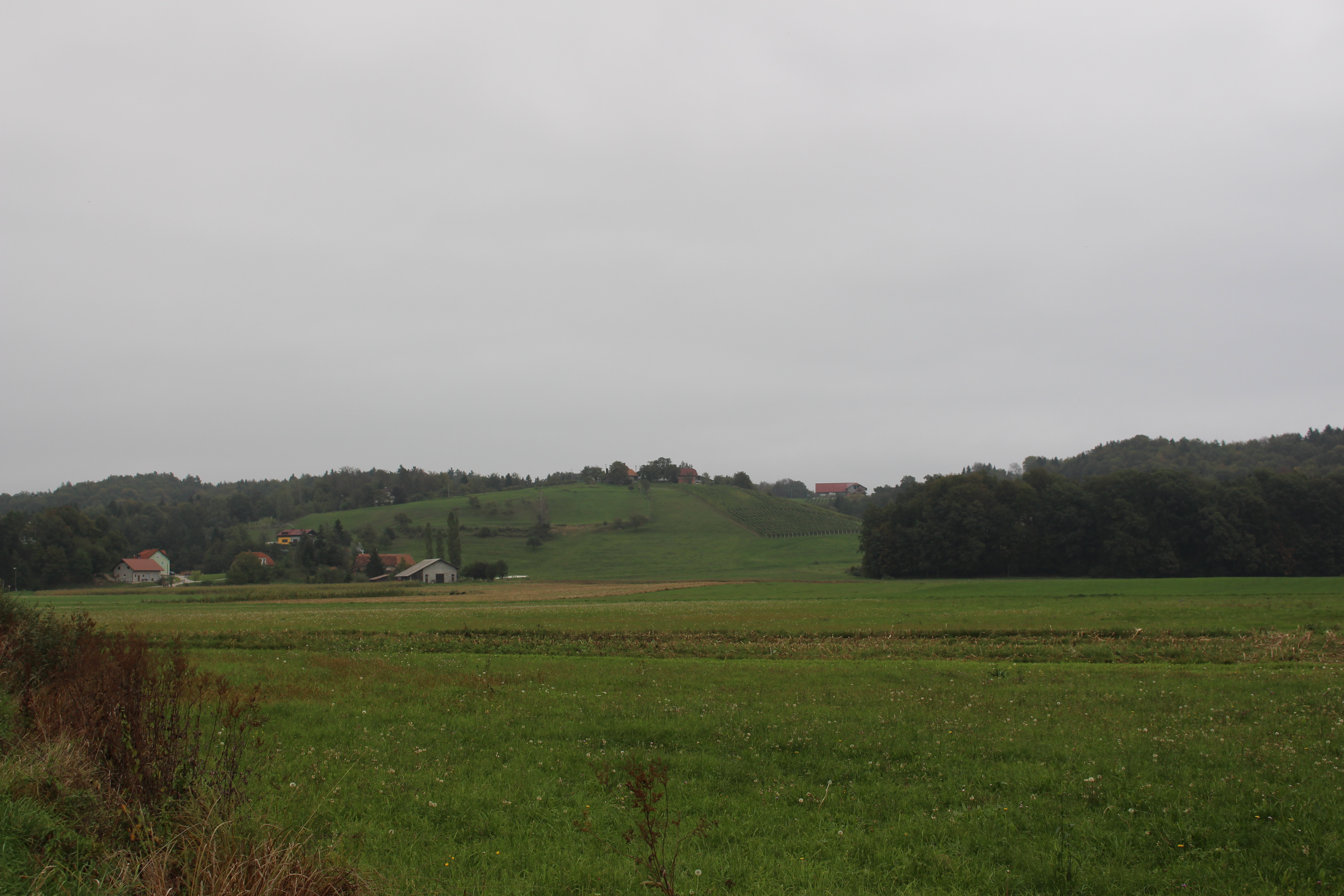

- Location in Slovenia
- Coordinates: 46°20′46.3″N 15°30′2.12″E
- Country: Slovenia
- Traditional region: Styria
- Statistical region: Savinja
- Municipality: Slovenske Konjice

Area
  - Total: 2.83 km^{2} (1.09 sq mi)
- Elevation: 339.5 m (1,114 ft)

Population (2002)
  - Total: 192

Spodnje Grušovje (pronounced [ˈspoːdnjɛ ˈɡɾuːʃɔu̯jɛ]) is a settlement in the Municipality of Slovenske Konjice in eastern Slovenia. The area is part of the traditional region of Styria. The municipality is now included in the Savinja Statistical Region. The A1 Slovenian motorway runs through the settlement.

A Roman-era mansio known as Mansio Ragando on the road from Celeia to Poetovio has been identified in the settlement.
