= Polene =

- Location in Slovenia
- Coordinates: 46°20′42.38″N 15°23′14.25″E
- Country: Slovenia
- Traditional region: Styria
- Statistical region: Savinja
- Municipality: Slovenske Konjice

Area
  - Total: 2.9 km^{2} (1.1 sq mi)
- Elevation: 406.4 m (1,333 ft)

Population (2002)
  - Total: 186

Polene (pronounced [ˈpoːlɛnɛ]) is a settlement in the Municipality of Slovenske Konjice in eastern Slovenia. It lies under the northern slopes of the Mount Konjice (Slovene: Konjiška gora) hills west of Slovenske Konjice. The area is part of the traditional region of Styria. The municipality is now included in the Savinja Statistical Region.
