= Zeče, Slovenske Konjice =

Zeče
- Location in Slovenia
- Coordinates: 46°21′15.34″N 15°23′36.93″E
- Country: Slovenia
- Traditional region: Styria
- Statistical region: Savinja
- Municipality: Slovenske Konjice

Area
  - Total: 1.64 km^{2} (0.63 sq mi)
- Elevation: 400.5 m (1,314 ft)

Population (2002)
  - Total: 241

Zeče (pronounced [ˈzeːtʃɛ]) is a settlement in the Municipality of Slovenske Konjice in eastern Slovenia. It lies in the hills northwest of Slovenske Konjice, off the main regional road to Zreče. The area is part of the traditional region of Styria. The municipality is now included in the Savinja Statistical Region.
