= Gabrovnik =

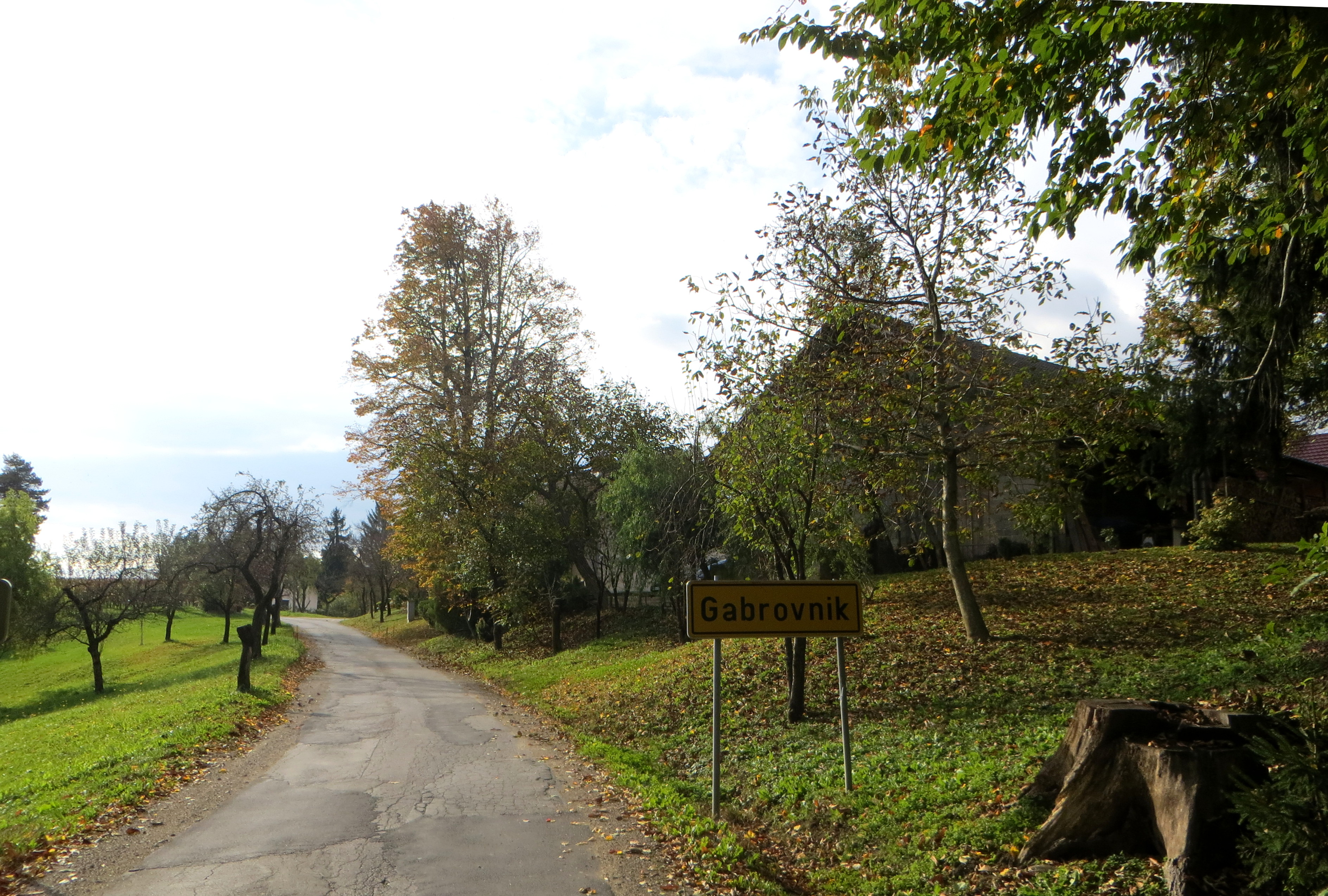

- Location in Slovenia
- Coordinates: 46°21′24.46″N 15°26′22.14″E
- Country: Slovenia
- Traditional region: Styria
- Statistical region: Savinja
- Municipality: Slovenske Konjice

Area
  - Total: 0.77 km^{2} (0.30 sq mi)
- Elevation: 382.4 m (1,255 ft)

Population (2002)
  - Total: 176

Gabrovnik (pronounced [ɡaˈbɾoːu̯nik]) is a settlement in the Municipality of Slovenske Konjice in eastern Slovenia. It lies in the hills northeast of Slovenske Konjice. The area is part of the traditional region of Styria. The municipality is now included in the Savinja Statistical Region.
