= Strtenik =

- Location in Slovenia
- Coordinates: 46°21′44.83″N 15°26′31.19″E
- Country: Slovenia
- Traditional region: Styria
- Statistical region: Savinja
- Municipality: Slovenske Konjice

Area
  - Total: 0.67 km^{2} (0.26 sq mi)
- Elevation: 370.3 m (1,215 ft)

Population (2002)
  - Total: 51

Strtenik (pronounced [stəɾtɛˈniːk]) is a small settlement in the hills north of Slovenske Konjice in eastern Slovenia. The area is part of the traditional region of Styria. The entire Municipality of Slovenske Konjice is now included in the Savinja Statistical Region.
