= Vešenik =

- Location in Slovenia
- Coordinates: 46°20′53.38″N 15°26′16.27″E
- Country: Slovenia
- Traditional region: Styria
- Statistical region: Savinja
- Municipality: Slovenske Konjice

Area
  - Total: 0.82 km^{2} (0.32 sq mi)
- Elevation: 355.4 m (1,166 ft)

Population (2002)
  - Total: 291

Vešenik (pronounced [ˈʋeːʃɛnik], German: Hangenberg) is a settlement in the Municipality of Slovenske Konjice in eastern Slovenia. It lies in the hills immediately northeast of Slovenske Konjice. The area is part of the traditional region of Styria. When statistical regions were created in Slovenia in 2007, the Municipality of Slovenske Konjice was included in the Savinja Statistical Region.
