= Selski Vrh =

Selski Vrh Vrh (until 1953)
- Location in Slovenia
- Coordinates: 46°18′25.83″N 15°32′1.42″E
- Country: Slovenia
- Traditional region: Styria
- Statistical region: Savinja
- Municipality: Slovenske Konjice

Area
  - Total: 1.91 km^{2} (0.74 sq mi)
- Elevation: 316.6 m (1,039 ft)

Population (2002)
  - Total: 93

Selski Vrh (pronounced [ˈseːu̯ski ˈʋəɾx]) is a dispersed settlement in the Municipality of Slovenske Konjice in eastern Slovenia. It lies in the hills east of Loče and west of Poljčane. The area is part of the traditional region of Styria. The municipality is now included in the Savinja Statistical Region.

== Name ==
The name of the settlement was changed from Vrh to Selski Vrh in 1953.
