= Spodnje Laže =

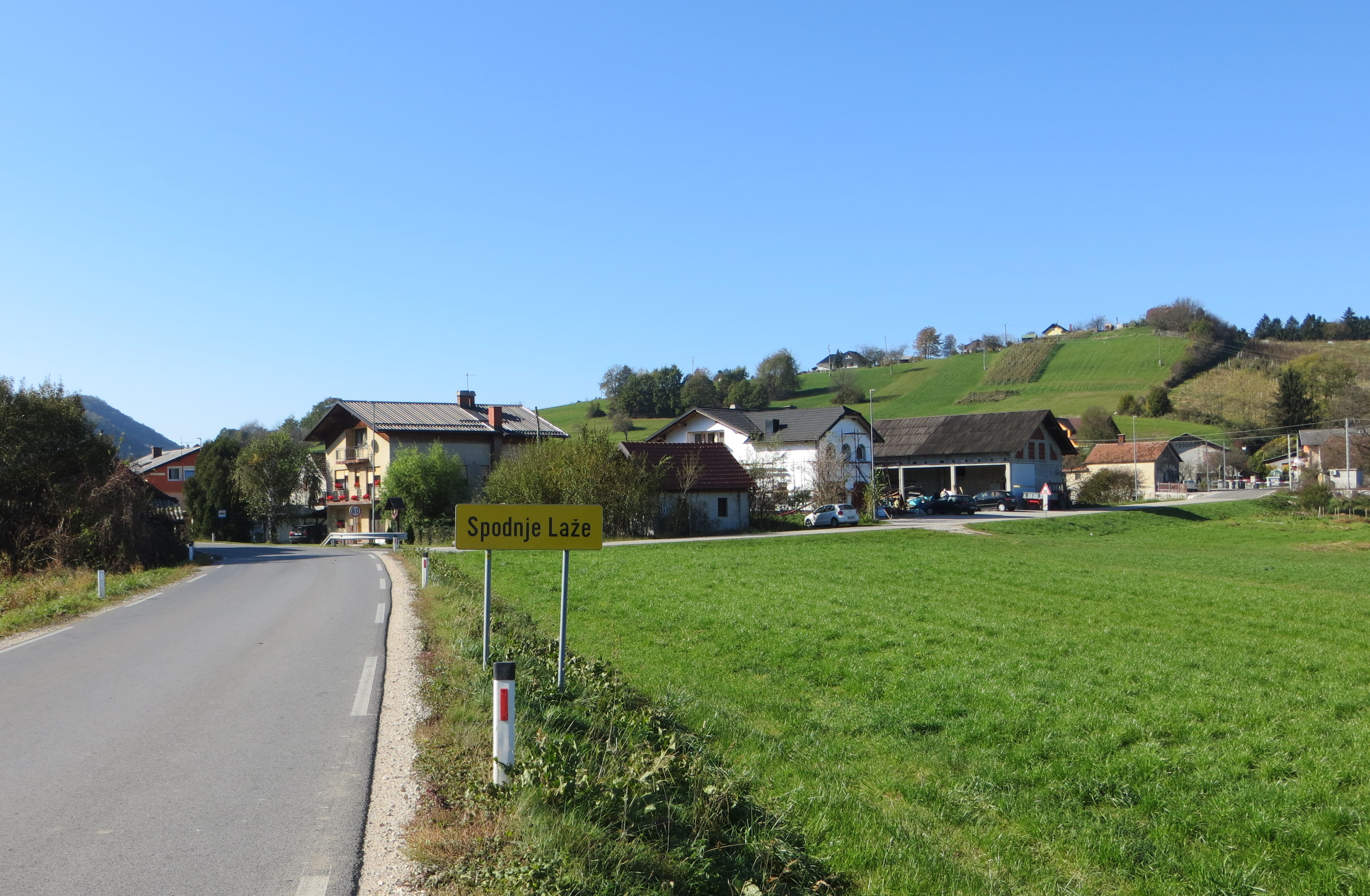

- Location in Slovenia
- Coordinates: 46°18′11.42″N 15°32′36.33″E
- Country: Slovenia
- Traditional region: Styria
- Statistical region: Savinja
- Municipality: Slovenske Konjice

Area
  - Total: 1.13 km^{2} (0.44 sq mi)
- Elevation: 267.8 m (879 ft)

Population (2002)
  - Total: 138

Spodnje Laže (pronounced [ˈspoːdnjɛ ˈlaːʒɛ]) is a settlement in the Municipality of Slovenske Konjice in eastern Slovenia. It lies on the left bank of the Dravinja River. The railway line from Celje to Pragersko runs through the settlement. The area is part of the traditional region of Styria. The municipality is now included in the Savinja Statistical Region.
