= Konjiška Vas =

- Location in Slovenia
- Coordinates: 46°19′24.18″N 15°26′51.56″E
- Country: Slovenia
- Traditional region: Styria
- Statistical region: Savinja
- Municipality: Slovenske Konjice

Area
  - Total: 3.21 km^{2} (1.24 sq mi)
- Elevation: 345.1 m (1,132 ft)

Population (2002)
  - Total: 172

Konjiška Vas (pronounced [kɔˈnjiːʃka ˈʋaːs]; Slovene: Konjiška vas) is a settlement in the Municipality of Slovenske Konjice in eastern Slovenia. It lies at the foot of the eastern end of the Mount Konjice (Konjiška gora) hills southeast of Slovenske Konjice. The area is part of the traditional region of Styria. The municipality is now included in the Savinja Statistical Region.

A Roman-era archaeological site in the hamlet of Podmočle in the settlement has been partially excavated and identified as a possible site of a Villa rustica.
