= Stare Slemene =

- Location in Slovenia
- Coordinates: 46°18′30.79″N 15°23′41.36″E
- Country: Slovenia
- Traditional region: Styria
- Statistical region: Savinja
- Municipality: Slovenske Konjice

Area
  - Total: 5.17 km^{2} (2.00 sq mi)
- Elevation: 441.1 m (1,447 ft)

Population (2002)
  - Total: 109

Stare Slemene (pronounced [ˈstaːɾɛ ˈsleːmɛnɛ]) is a settlement in the Municipality of Slovenske Konjice in eastern Slovenia. The area is part of the traditional region of Styria. The municipality is now included in the Savinja Statistical Region.

The settlement is dispersed in the hills around the 12th-century Žiče Charterhouse on the southern slopes of the Mount Konjice (Slovene: Konjiška gora) hills.

== Gallery ==
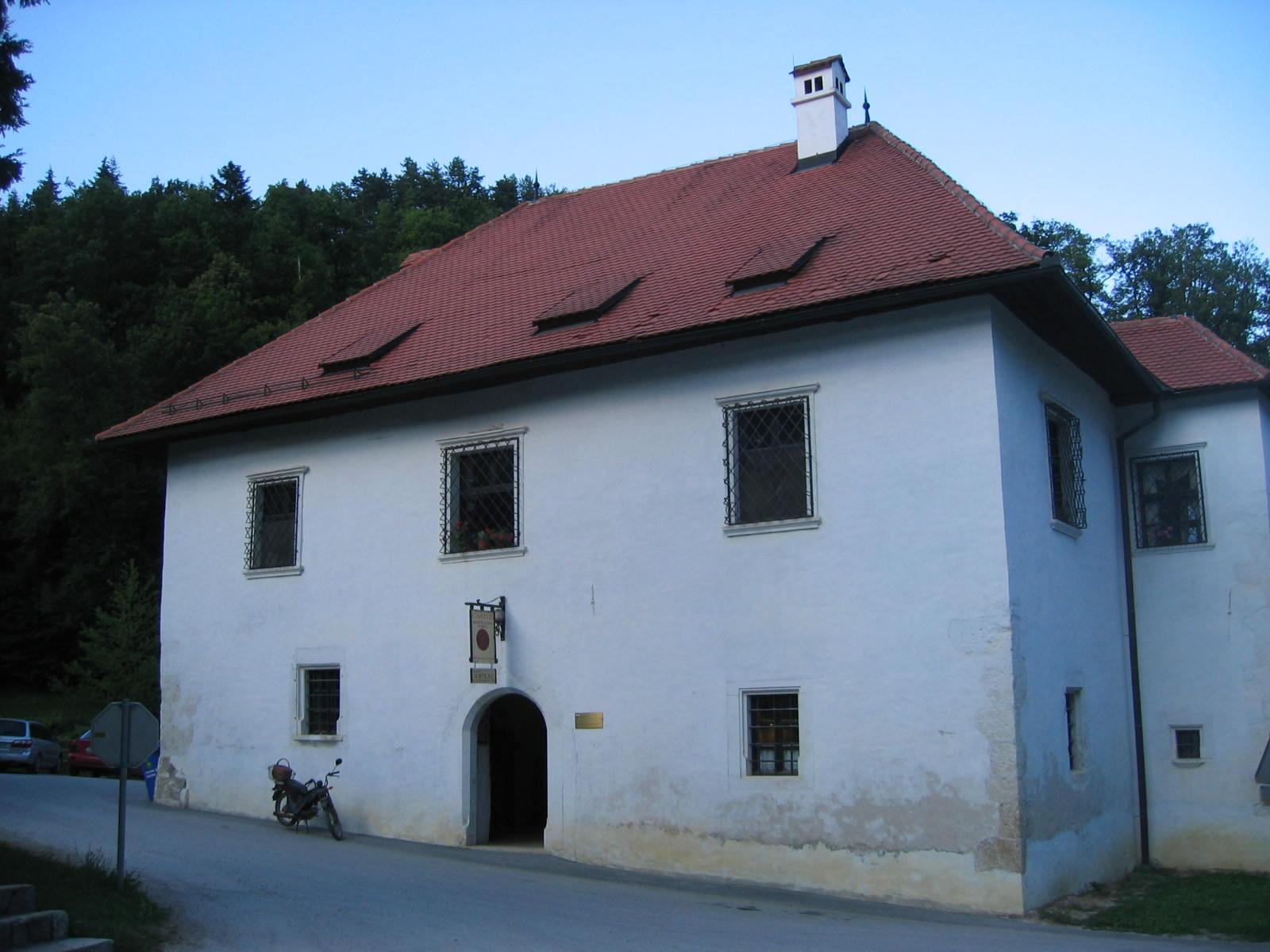
Oldest restaurant in Slovenia (near the Carthusian Žiče monastery) since 1467
