= Sojek =

- Location in Slovenia
- Coordinates: 46°19′19.39″N 15°21′59.79″E
- Country: Slovenia
- Traditional region: Styria
- Statistical region: Savinja
- Municipality: Slovenske Konjice

Area
  - Total: 2.22 km^{2} (0.86 sq mi)
- Elevation: 558.5 m (1,832 ft)

Population (2002)
  - Total: 94

Sojek (pronounced [ˈsoːjɛk]) is a small settlement in the Municipality of Slovenske Konjice in eastern Slovenia. It lies dispersed on the southern slopes of the Mount Konjice (Slovene: Konjiška gora) hills southwest of Slovenske Konjice. The area of the entire Municipality of Slovenske Konjice is part of the traditional region of Styria and is now included in the Savinja Statistical Region.
