= Blato, Slovenske Konjice =

Blato
- Location in Slovenia
- Coordinates: 46°19′50.59″N 15°26′6.42″E
- Country: Slovenia
- Traditional region: Styria
- Statistical region: Savinja
- Municipality: Slovenske Konjice

Area
  - Total: 0.4 km^{2} (0.15 sq mi)
- Elevation: 330.8 m (1,085 ft)

Population (2002)
  - Total: 93

Blato (pronounced [ˈblaːtɔ], German: Kotdorf) is a small settlement in the Municipality of Slovenske Konjice in eastern Slovenia. It lies under the northeastern slopes of Mount Konjice (Slovene: Konjiška gora), just southeast of Slovenske Konjice itself. The area is part of the traditional region of Styria. The municipality is now included in the Savinja Statistical Region.
