= Zbelovo =

- Village
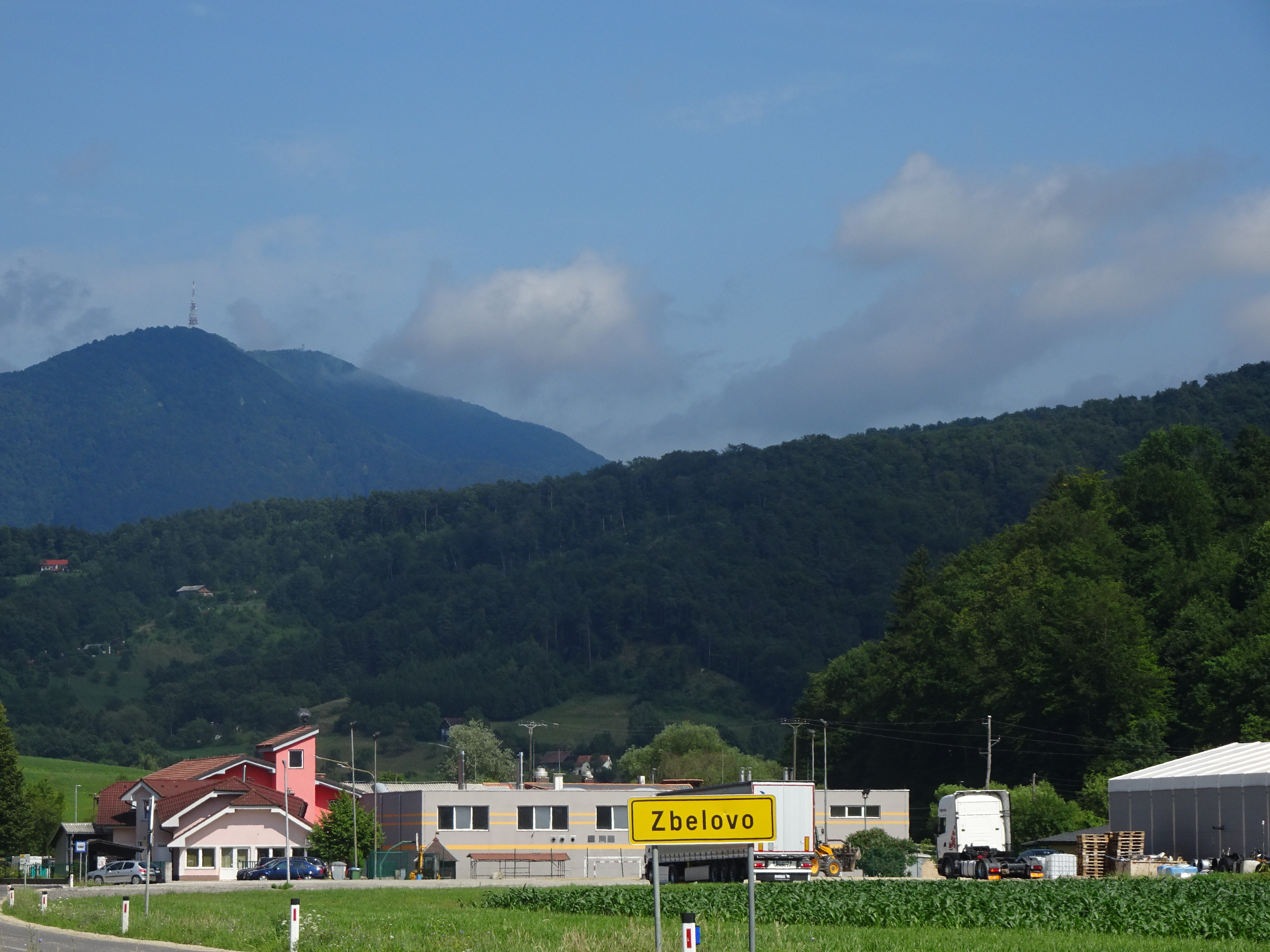

- Location in Slovenia
- Coordinates: 46°17′59.05″N 15°31′39.19″E
- Country: Slovenia
- Traditional region: Styria
- Statistical region: Savinja
- Municipality: Slovenske Konjice

Area
  - Total: 0.69 km^{2} (0.27 sq mi)
- Elevation: 267.1 m (876 ft)

Population (2002)
  - Total: 281

Zbelovo (pronounced [ˈzbeːlɔʋɔ]) is a village in the Municipality of Slovenske Konjice in eastern Slovenia. It lies on the left bank of the Dravinja River. The area is part of the traditional region of Styria. The municipality is now included in the Savinja Statistical Region.

At a site near the village evidence of Neolithic and Eneolithic settlement have been found.
