= Perovec =

- Location in Slovenia
- Coordinates: 46°20′11.19″N 15°29′18.31″E
- Country: Slovenia
- Traditional region: Styria
- Statistical region: Savinja
- Municipality: Slovenske Konjice

Area
  - Total: 0.55 km^{2} (0.21 sq mi)
- Elevation: 284.2 m (932 ft)

Population (2002)
  - Total: 45

Perovec (pronounced [ˈpeːɾɔʋəts]) is a small settlement in the Municipality of Slovenske Konjice in eastern Slovenia. It lies north of Draža Vas, just east of the Slovenian A1 motorway. The area is part of the traditional region of Styria. The municipality is now included in the Savinja Statistical Region.
