= Škalce =

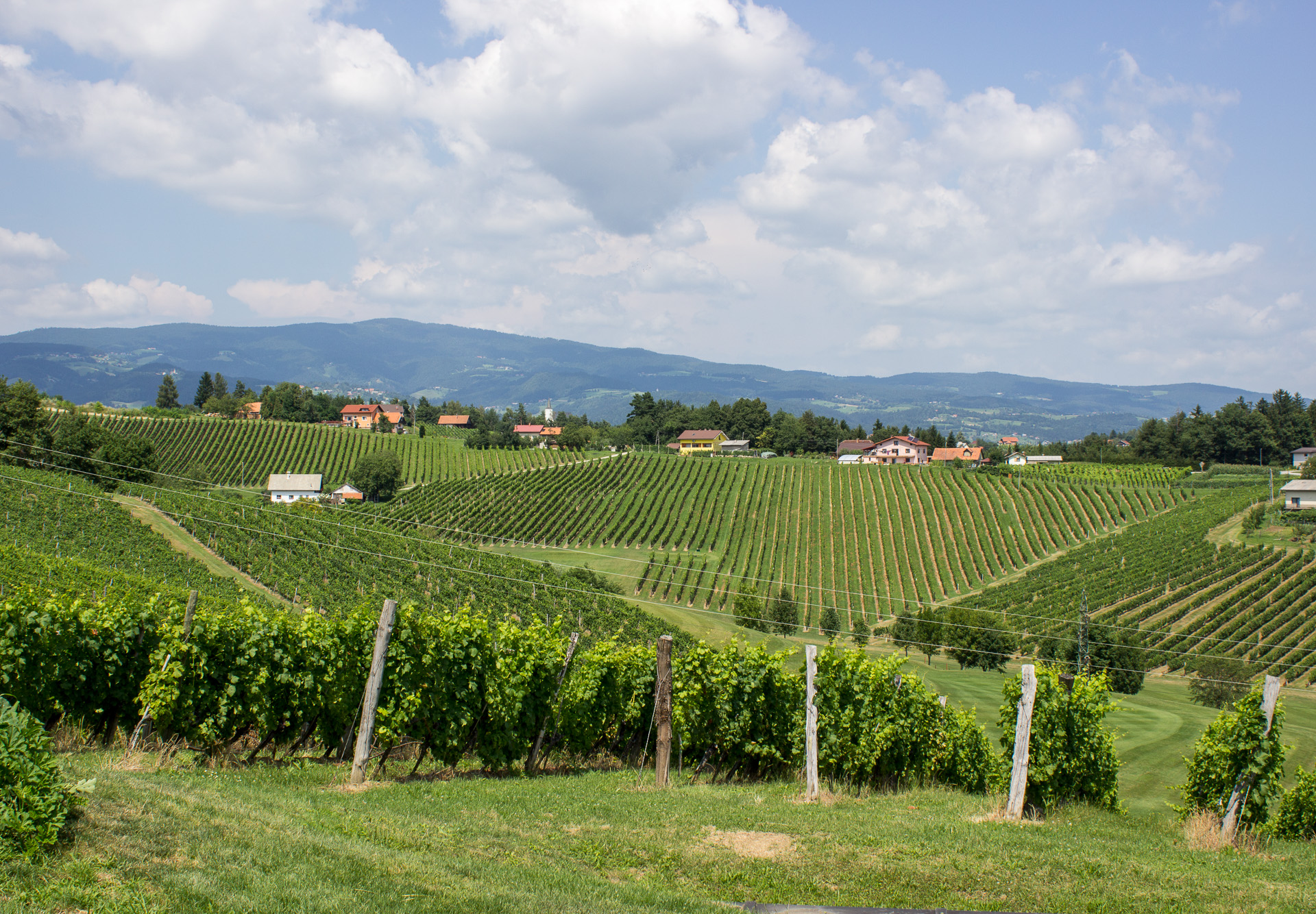

- Location in Slovenia
- Coordinates: 46°20′57.4″N 15°25′42.16″E
- Country: Slovenia
- Traditional region: Styria
- Statistical region: Savinja
- Municipality: Slovenske Konjice

Area
  - Total: 1.58 km^{2} (0.61 sq mi)
- Elevation: 359.2 m (1,178 ft)

Population (2002)
  - Total: 405

Škalce (pronounced [ˈʃkaːu̯tsɛ]) is a settlement in the Municipality of Slovenske Konjice in eastern Slovenia. It lies in the hills just north of Slovenske Konjice itself. The area is part of the traditional region of Styria. The municipality is now included in the Savinja Statistical Region.

The hills around the settlement are covered with small vineyards with associated buildings and features, some dating to the 14th century.
