= Brdo, Slovenske Konjice =

Brdo
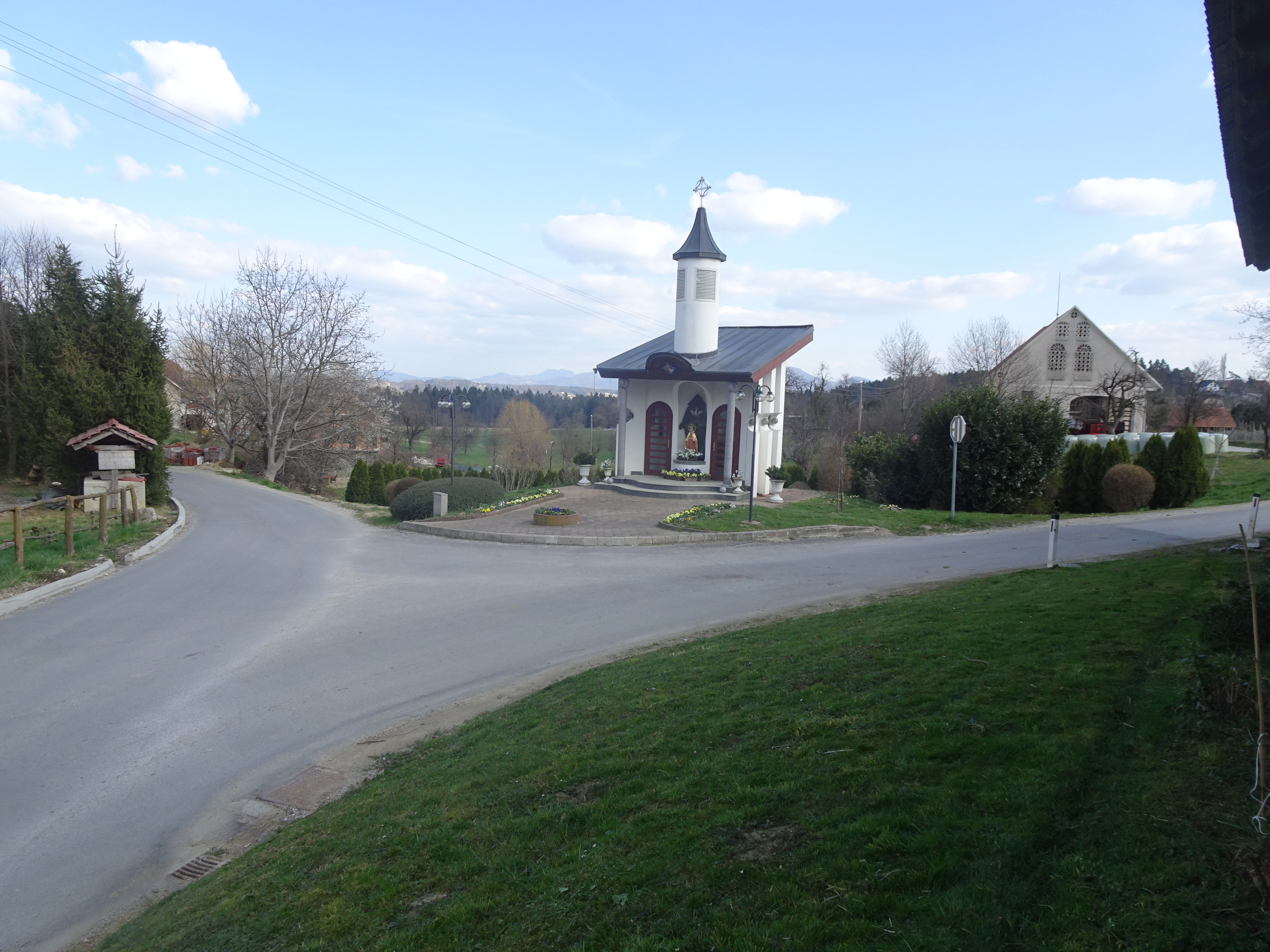

- Location in Slovenia
- Coordinates: 46°21′7.44″N 15°27′6.44″E
- Country: Slovenia
- Traditional region: Styria
- Statistical region: Savinja
- Municipality: Slovenske Konjice

Area
  - Total: 1.15 km^{2} (0.44 sq mi)
- Elevation: 349.3 m (1,146 ft)

Population (2002)
  - Total: 92

Brdo (pronounced [ˈbəɾdɔ]) is a settlement in the Municipality of Slovenske Konjice in eastern Slovenia. Traditionally the entire area around Slovenske Konjice was part of Styria. It is now included in the Savinja Statistical Region.
