= Dobrava pri Konjicah =

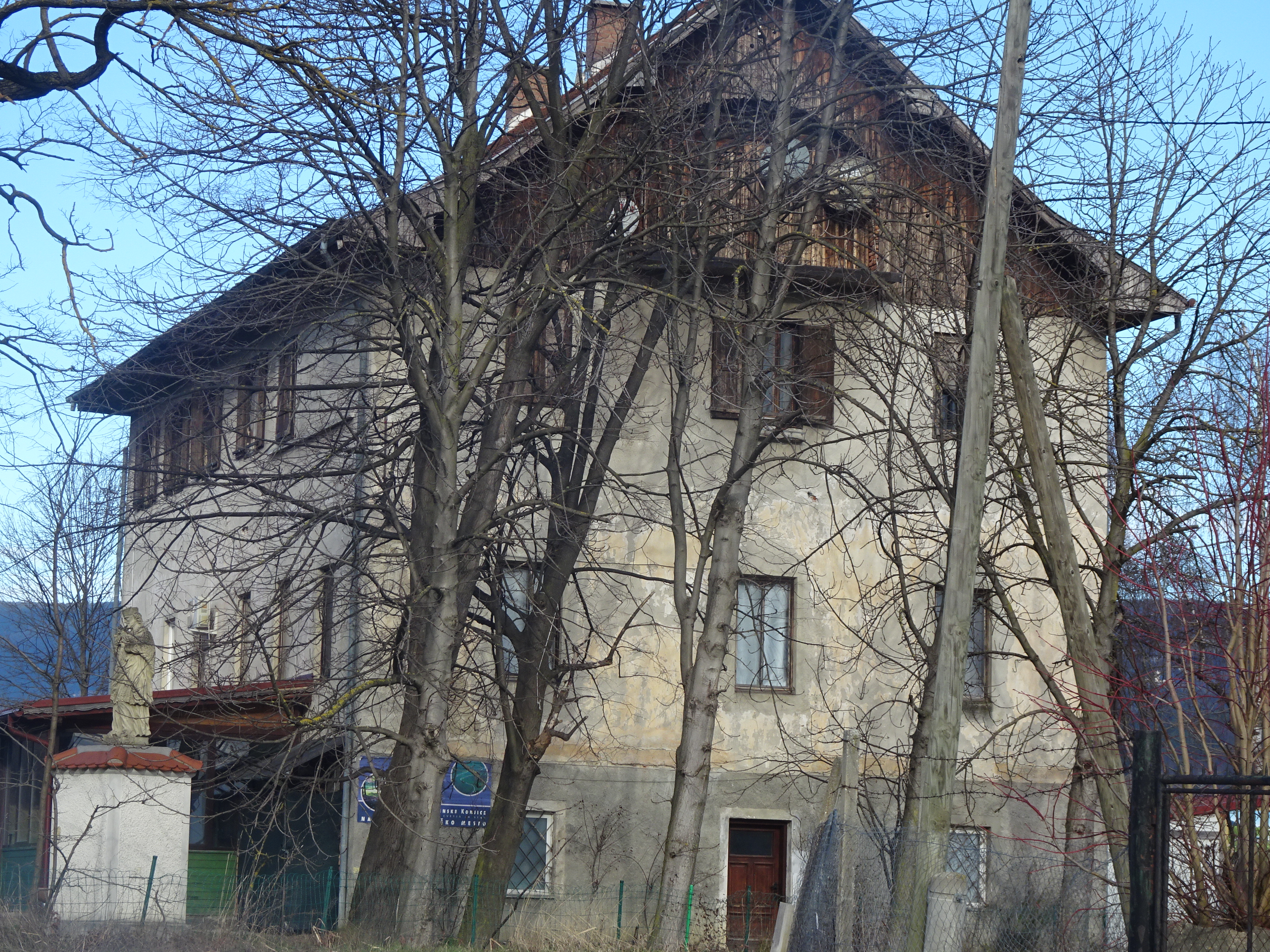

- Location in Slovenia
- Coordinates: 46°20′43.03″N 15°24′48.26″E
- Country: Slovenia
- Traditional region: Styria
- Statistical region: Savinja
- Municipality: Slovenske Konjice

Area
  - Total: 0.45 km^{2} (0.17 sq mi)
- Elevation: 331.9 m (1,089 ft)

Population (2002)
  - Total: 87

Dobrava pri Konjicah (pronounced [ˈdoːbɾaʋa pɾi kɔˈnjiːtsax]) is a settlement northwest of Slovenske Konjice in eastern Slovenia. The area is part of the traditional region of Styria. The entire Municipality of Slovenske Konjice is now included in the Savinja Statistical Region of Slovenia.

== Name ==
The name of the settlement was changed from Dobrava to Dobrava pri Konjicah in 1953.
