= Podob =

- Location in Slovenia
- Coordinates: 46°19′11.47″N 15°29′45.36″E
- Country: Slovenia
- Traditional region: Styria
- Statistical region: Savinja
- Municipality: Slovenske Konjice

Area
  - Total: 0.76 km^{2} (0.29 sq mi)
- Elevation: 284.1 m (932 ft)

Population (2002)
  - Total: 23

Podob (pronounced [pɔˈdoːp] or [ˈpɔːdɔp]) is a small settlement in the Municipality of Slovenske Konjice in eastern Slovenia. The area is part of the traditional region of Styria. The municipality is now included in the Savinja Statistical Region.

To the north of the settlement a prehistoric hill fort has been identified. It dates to the Early Iron Age.
