= Dobrnež =

- Location in Slovenia
- Coordinates: 46°20′35.02″N 15°27′14.12″E
- Country: Slovenia
- Traditional region: Styria
- Statistical region: Savinja
- Municipality: Slovenske Konjice

Area
  - Total: 0.84 km^{2} (0.32 sq mi)
- Elevation: 308.7 m (1,013 ft)

Population (2002)
  - Total: 117

Dobrnež (pronounced [ˈdoːbəɾnɛʃ], in older sources Doberneš, German: Dobernesch) is a settlement in the Municipality of Slovenske Konjice in eastern Slovenia. It lies on regional road leading east from Slovenske Konjice to Slovenska Bistrica. The area is part of the traditional region of Styria. The municipality is now included in the Savinja Statistical Region.

The Golič Mansion is a 16th-century mansion in the settlement. It is a three-storey building with a square floor plan and two rounded turrets on opposite corners. It was greatly modified in the 19th century.
