= Preloge pri Konjicah =

- Location in Slovenia
- Coordinates: 46°20′47.44″N 15°23′51.7″E
- Country: Slovenia
- Traditional region: Styria
- Statistical region: Savinja
- Municipality: Slovenske Konjice

Area
  - Total: 0.57 km^{2} (0.22 sq mi)
- Elevation: 422.4 m (1,386 ft)

Population (2002)
  - Total: 166

Preloge pri Konjicah (pronounced [ˈpɾeːlɔɡɛ pɾi kɔˈnjiːtsax]) is a small settlement in the Municipality of Slovenske Konjice in eastern Slovenia. It lies west of the town of Slovenske Konjice in the traditional region of Styria. The municipality is now included in the Savinja Statistical Region.

== Name ==
The name of the settlement was changed from Preloge to Preloge pri Konjicah in 1953.
