= Nova Vas pri Konjicah =

- Location in Slovenia
- Coordinates: 46°19′35.58″N 15°27′55.24″E
- Country: Slovenia
- Traditional region: Styria
- Statistical region: Savinja
- Municipality: Slovenske Konjice

Area
  - Total: 1.02 km^{2} (0.39 sq mi)
- Elevation: 301.2 m (988 ft)

Population (2002)
  - Total: 82

Nova Vas pri Konjicah (pronounced [ˈnɔːʋa ˈʋaːs pɾi kɔˈnjiːtsax]; Slovene: Nova vas pri Konjicah) is a small settlement in the Municipality of Slovenske Konjice in eastern Slovenia. The A1 Slovenian motorway runs through the settlement. The area is part of the traditional region of Styria. The municipality is now included in the Savinja Statistical Region.

== Name ==
The name of the settlement was changed from Nova vas to Nova vas pri Konjicah in 1953.
