= Draža Vas =

- Location in Slovenia
- Coordinates: 46°19′34.08″N 15°28′44.74″E
- Country: Slovenia
- Traditional region: Styria
- Statistical region: Savinja
- Municipality: Slovenske Konjice

Area
  - Total: 2.45 km^{2} (0.95 sq mi)
- Elevation: 283.9 m (931 ft)

Population (2002)
  - Total: 487

Draža Vas (pronounced [ˈdɾaːʒa ˈʋaːs]; Slovene: Draža vas) is a settlement in the Municipality of Slovenske Konjice in eastern Slovenia. It lies on the Dravinja River east of Slovenske Konjice. The area is part of the traditional region of Styria. The municipality is now included in the Savinja Statistical Region.

A prehistoric hill fort has been identified in the area with archaeological topography. Surface finds have helped date the site to the Early Iron Age.
