= Zgornja Pristava, Slovenske Konjice =

Zgornja Pristava
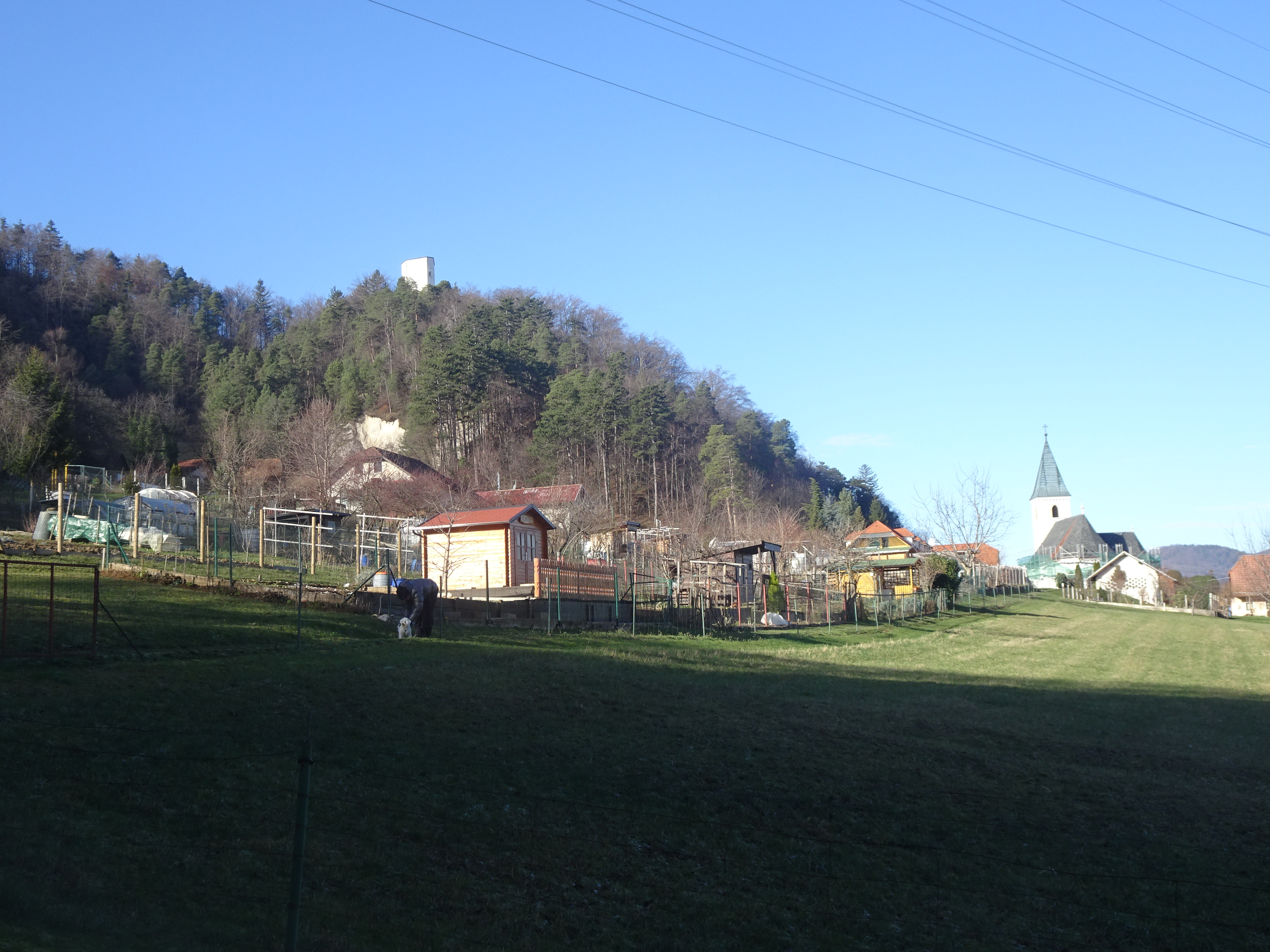
- Zgornja Pristava

- Location in Slovenia
- Coordinates: 46°20′23.01″N 15°24′28.47″E
- Country: Slovenia
- Traditional region: Styria
- Statistical region: Savinja
- Municipality: Slovenske Konjice

Area
  - Total: 5.85 km^{2} (2.26 sq mi)
- Elevation: 360.9 m (1,184 ft)

Population (2002)
  - Total: 115

Zgornja Pristava (pronounced [ˈzɡoːɾnja ˈpɾiːstaʋa], in older sources Zgornja Pristova, German: Oberpristova) is a settlement in the Municipality of Slovenske Konjice in eastern Slovenia. It lies south and west of Slovenske Konjice and its territory extends up to Deer Peak (Slovene: Jelenov vrh, 924 meters or 3,031 feet) on Mount Konjice (Slovene: Konjiška gora). The area is part of the traditional region of Styria. The municipality is now included in the Savinja Statistical Region.

== Name ==
The name Zgornja Pristava literally means 'upper manor farm'. The name Pristava comes from the common noun pristava 'manor farm; house with outbuildings and land'. Manor farms were typically found near a manor house or castle and were operated by its servants. Settlements with this name and the semantically equivalent Marof are frequent in Slovenia.

== Mass grave ==
Zgornja Pristava is the site of a mass grave from the period immediately after the Second World War. The Trebnik Manor Mass Grave (Slovene: Grobišče nad graščino Trebnik) lies on a slope southwest of Slovenske Konjice near an electric power line. It contains the remains of 30 to 40 Slovene civilians from Slovenske Konjice that were murdered in May or June 1945.

== Konjice Castle ==
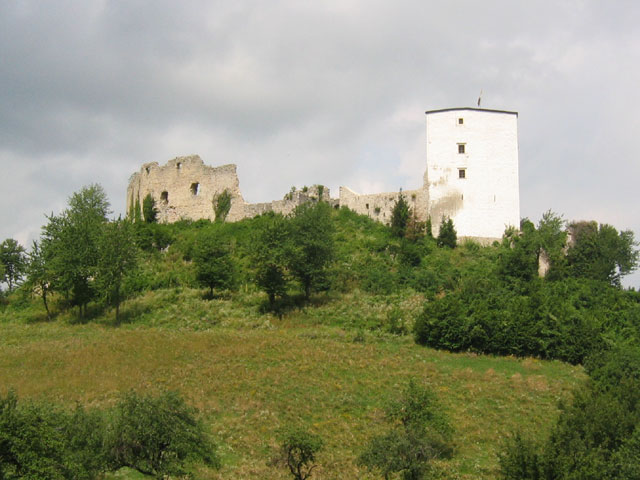
Konjice Castle ruins

The ruins of Konjice Castle lie on the slopes of Mount Konjice south of the settlement. It was an extensive castle built in the 12th century and abandoned in the 18th century.

== Notable people ==
Notable people that were born or lived in Zgornja Pristave include the following:

- Anton Vogrinec (1873–1947), Roman Catholic priest, author and reform-minded theologian
