= Bzová =

- Municipality
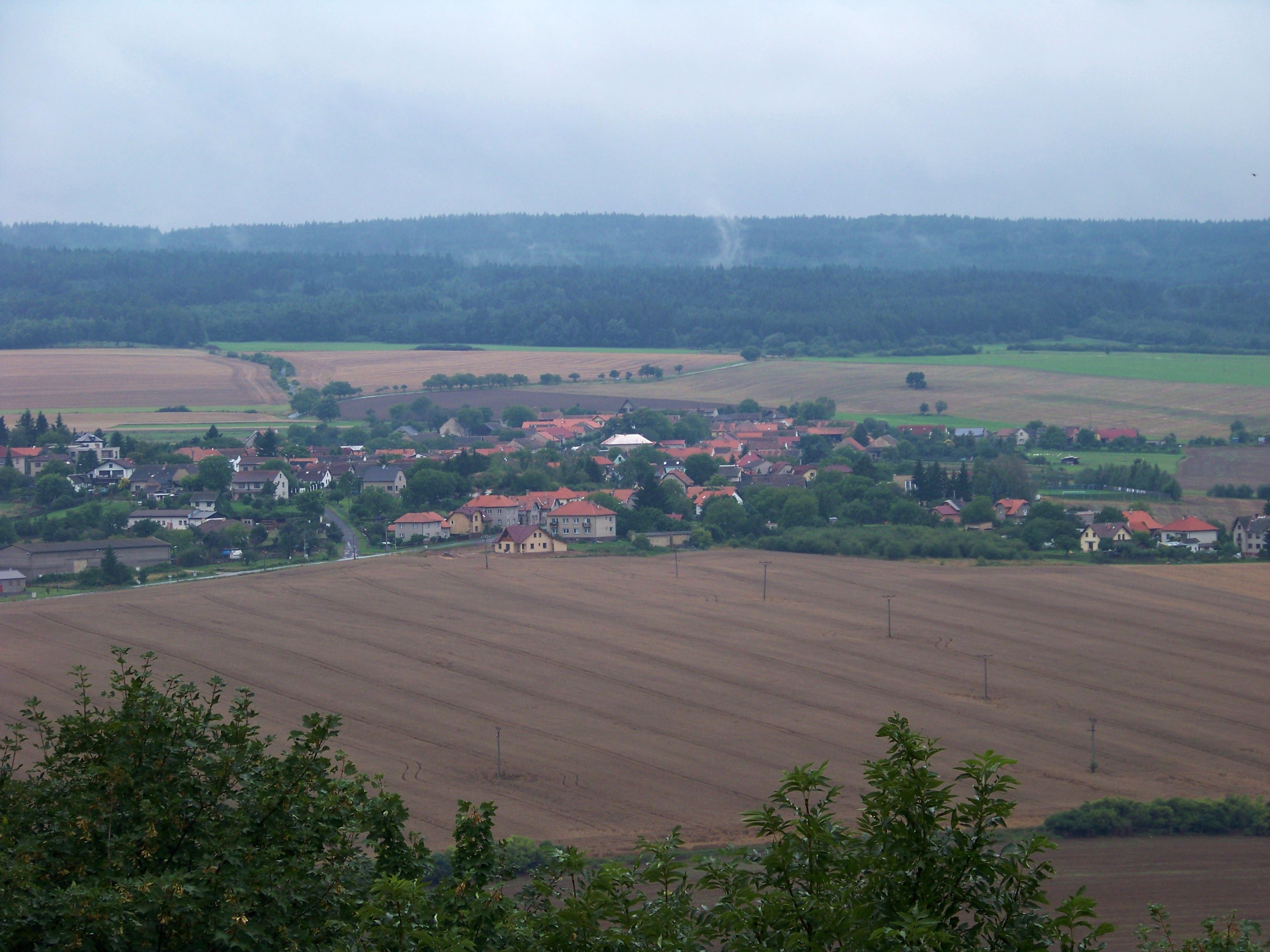
- View from the southeast

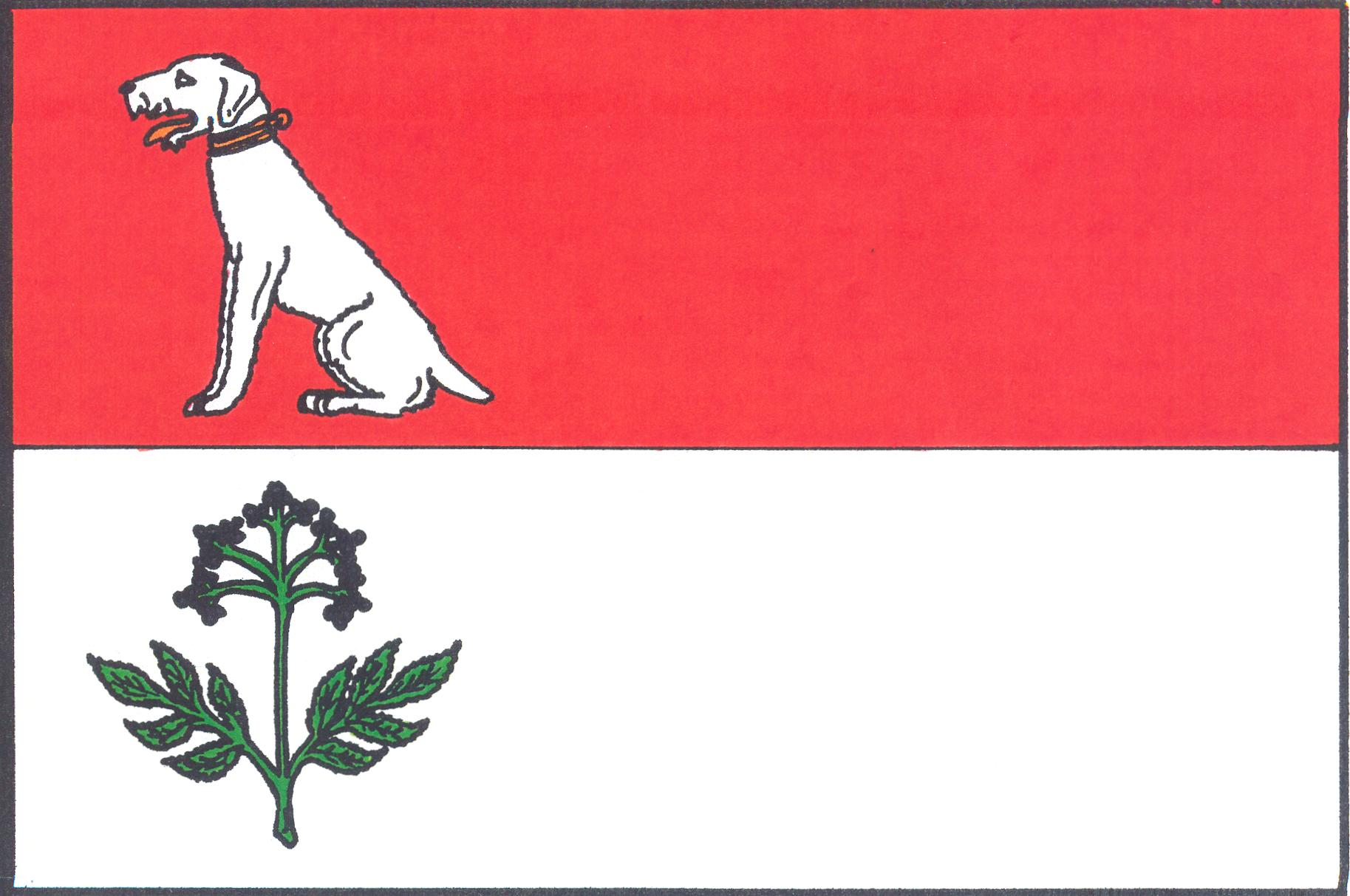
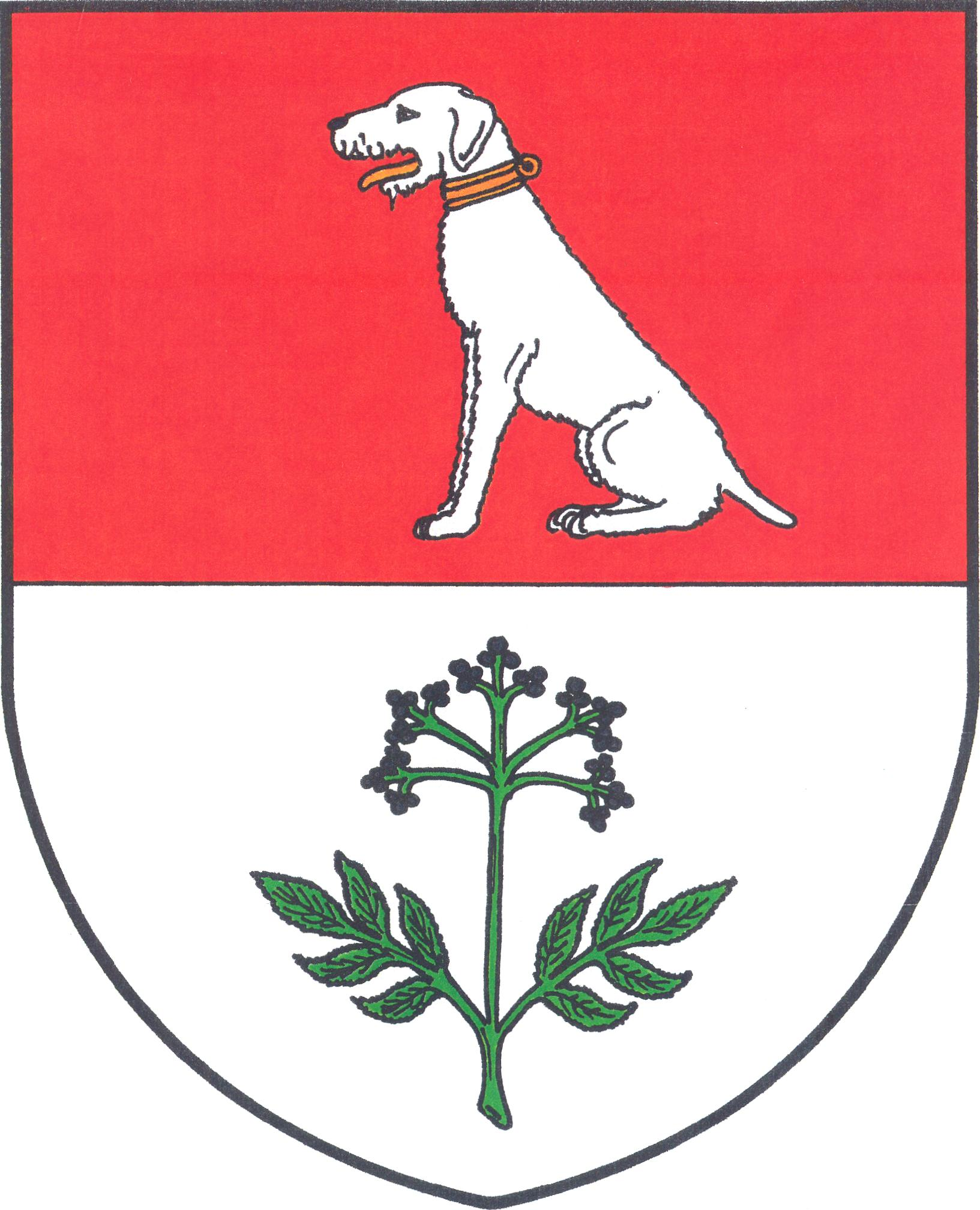
- Flag Coat of arms

- Location in the Czech Republic
- Coordinates: 49°53′53″N 13°51′45″E
- Country: Czech Republic
- Region: Central Bohemian
- District: Beroun
- First mentioned: 1390

Area
  - Total: 11.21 km^{2} (4.33 sq mi)
- Elevation: 398 m (1,306 ft)

Population (2026-01-01)
  - Total: 464
  - Density: 41.4/km^{2} (107/sq mi)
- Time zone: UTC+1 (CET)
  - Summer (DST): UTC+2 (CEST)
- Postal code: 267 43
- Website: www.bzova.cz

Bzová is a municipality and village in Beroun District in the Central Bohemian Region of the Czech Republic. It has about 500 inhabitants.

== Demographics ==
Historical population
Year	Pop.	±%
1869	759	—
1880	751	−1.1%
1890	679	−9.6%
1900	739	+8.8%
1910	698	−5.5%
1921	673	−3.6%
1930	668	−0.7%
1950	527	−21.1%
1961	524	−0.6%
1970	520	−0.8%
1980	508	−2.3%
1991	441	−13.2%
2001	414	−6.1%
2011	432	+4.3%
2021	439	+1.6%
Source: Censuses
