= Pristava pri Leskovcu =

Pristava pri Leskovcu Pristava (until 1953)
- Location in Slovenia
- Coordinates: 45°53′18.58″N 15°27′23.87″E
- Country: Slovenia
- Traditional region: Lower Carniola
- Statistical region: Lower Sava
- Municipality: Krško

Area
  - Total: 4.35 km^{2} (1.68 sq mi)
- Elevation: 153.2 m (503 ft)

Population (2002)
  - Total: 83
- Postal code: 8273

Pristava pri Leskovcu (pronounced [pɾiˈstaːʋa pɾi lɛˈskoːu̯tsu]) is a settlement south of Leskovec pri Krškem in the Municipality of Krško in eastern Slovenia. It lies south of the A2 motorway from Ljubljana to Zagreb and north of the Krka River. The area is part of the traditional region of Lower Carniola. It is now included with the rest of the municipality in the Lower Sava Statistical Region. Its territory includes the hamlet of Globelo southeast of the main settlement, with a hunting lodge that was known as Globelj (German: Globelhof).

== Name ==
The name of the settlement was changed from Pristava to Pristava pri Leskovcu in 1953.

== Cultural heritage ==
There is a small chapel-shrine in the settlement. It belongs to the Parish of Brestanica and was built in the early 20th century.
