= Tepanje =

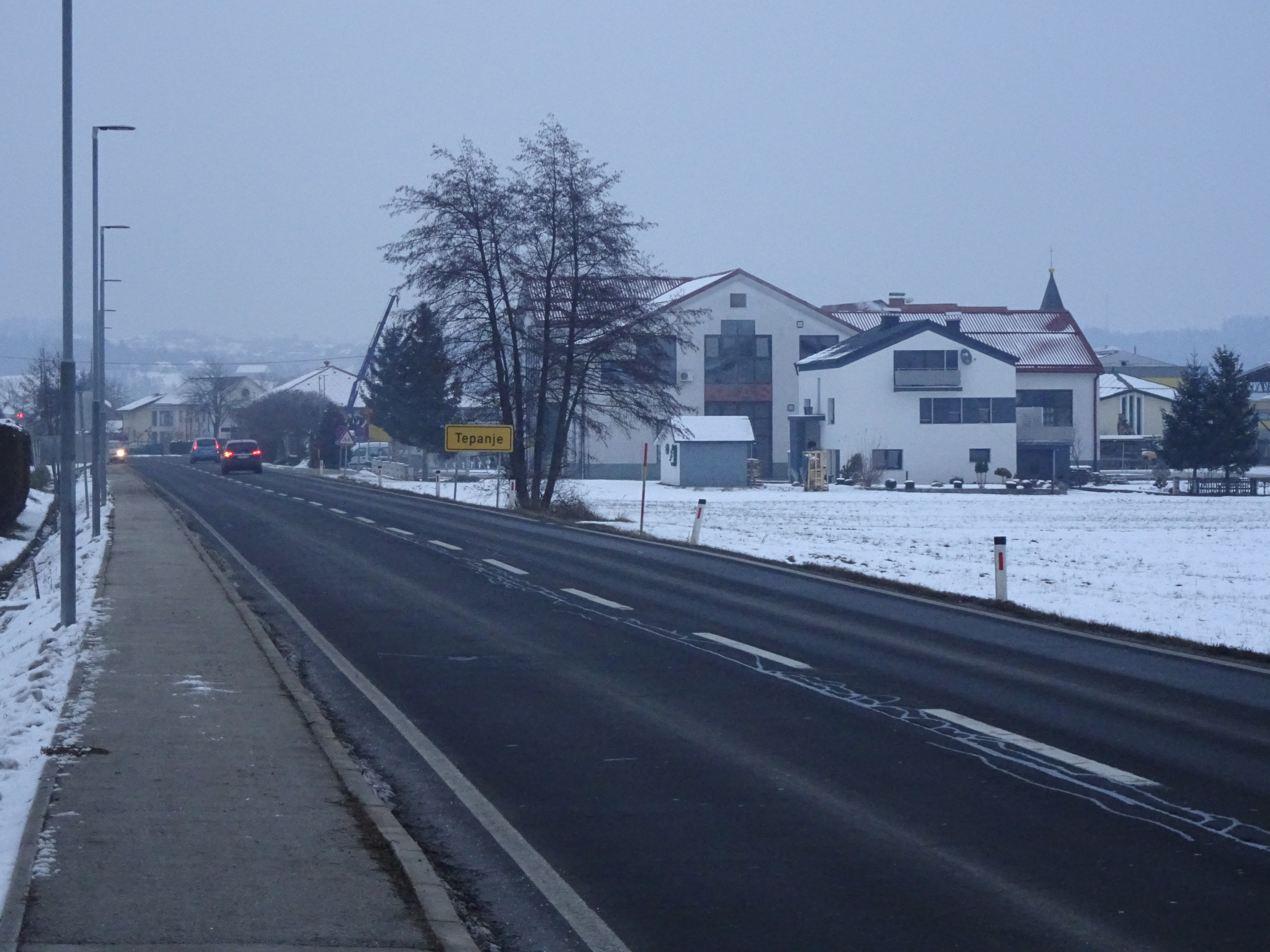

- Location in Slovenia
- Coordinates: 46°20′38.96″N 15°28′21.5″E
- Country: Slovenia
- Traditional region: Styria
- Statistical region: Savinja
- Municipality: Slovenske Konjice

Area
  - Total: 2.02 km^{2} (0.78 sq mi)
- Elevation: 296.3 m (972 ft)

Population (2002)
  - Total: 508

Tepanje (pronounced [ˈteːpanjɛ], German: Tepina) is a village in the Municipality of Slovenske Konjice in eastern Slovenia. The area is part of the traditional region of Styria. The municipality is now included in the Savinja Statistical Region.

The A1 motorway and the Slovenske Konjice interchange are southwest of the settlement. The village developed along the parallel old regional road from Celje to Maribor and near the bridge across Oplotnica Creek.
