= Loče, Slovenske Konjice =

Loče Loče pri Poljčanah (1955–1999)
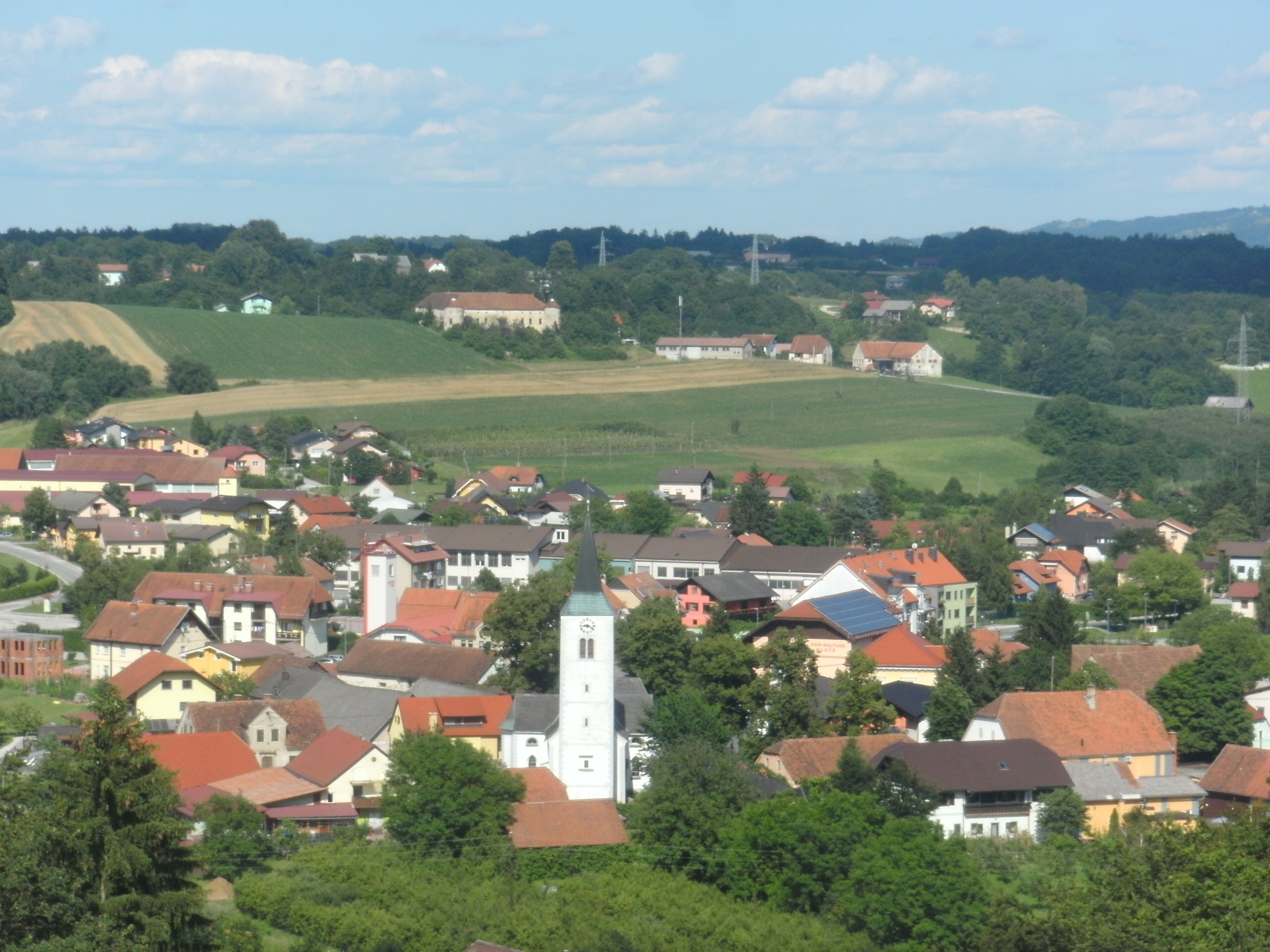
- Loče

- Location in Slovenia
- Coordinates: 46°18′3.08″N 15°29′56.42″E
- Country: Slovenia
- Traditional region: Styria
- Statistical region: Savinja
- Municipality: Slovenske Konjice

Area
  - Total: 1.58 km^{2} (0.61 sq mi)
- Elevation: 274 m (899 ft)

Population (2002)
  - Total: 538

Loče (pronounced [ˈloːtʃɛ]; German: Heiligengeist in Loče) is a settlement in the Municipality of Slovenske Konjice in eastern Slovenia. It lies on the left bank of the Dravinja River. The area is part of the traditional region of Styria. The municipality is now included in the Savinja Statistical Region.

== Name ==
The name of the settlement was changed from Loče to Loče pri Poljčanah in 1955. The name Loče was restored in 1999. In the past it was known as Heiligengeist in Loče in German.

== History ==
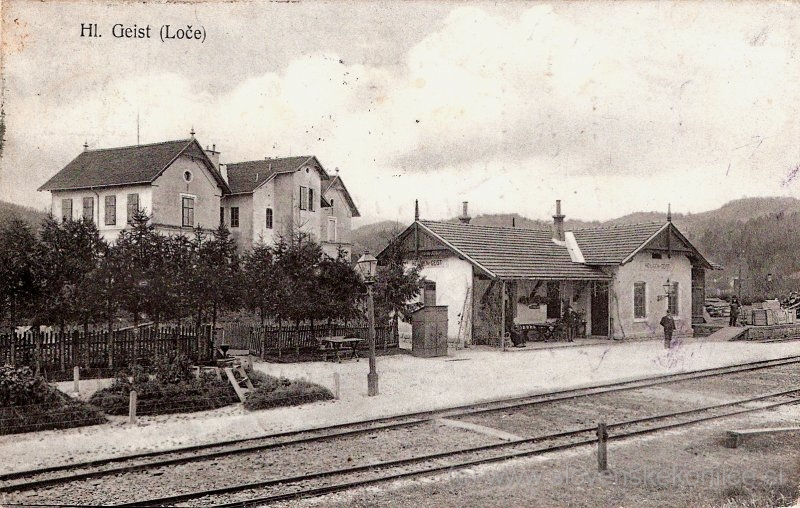
Former Loče Railroad Station, 1905

On 20 June 1892 work started on a narrow gauge (760 mm) steam railroad line called Konjičanka from Poljčane to Slovenske Konjice, with a station in Loče. The line was opened on 20 December 1892, and on 29 June 1921 it was extended to Zreče. It was closed in 1963, and the tracks were removed in 1970.

== Church ==
The parish church in the settlement is dedicated to the Holy Spirit and belongs to the Roman Catholic Archdiocese of Maribor. It is a 15th-century church that was extended in the 17th century and restyled in the Baroque style in the 18th century.
