= Dravinja =

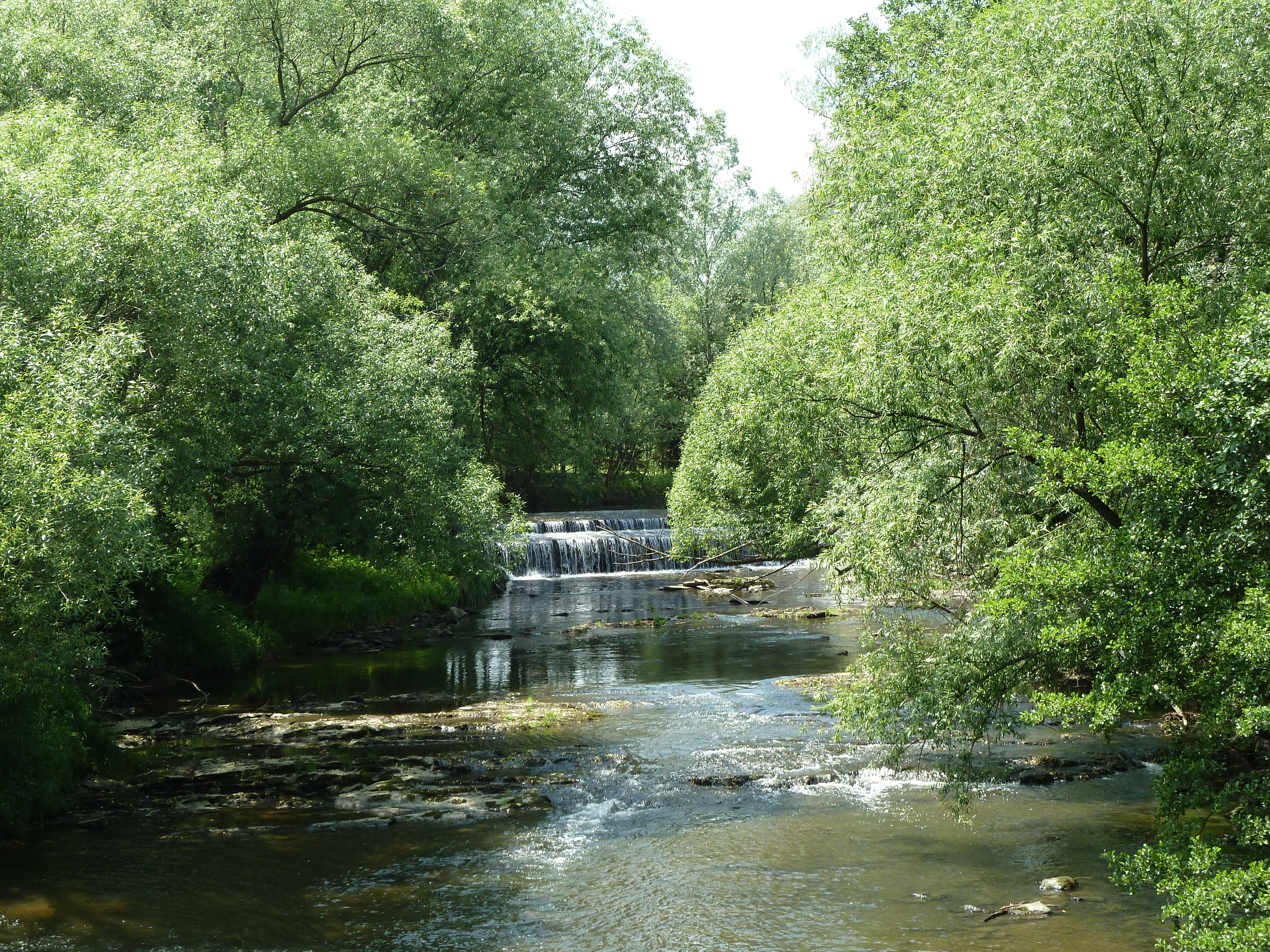
- The Dravinja River in Slape

Physical characteristics
- Source
  - location: Pohorje Massif, southwest of Mount Rogla
  - elevation: 1,150 m (3,770 ft)
- Mouth
  - location: Drava
  - coordinates: 46.3693°N 15.9452°E
  - elevation: 210 m (690 ft)
- Length: 73 km (45 mi)
- Basin size: 811 km^{2} (313 sq mi)

Basin features
- Progression: Drava→ Danube→ Black Sea

The Dravinja (German: Drann, pronounced [dʁan]) is the largest tributary of the Drava River in Slovenia. It is 73 kilometres (45 mi) long. Its source is on the Pohorje Massif southwest of Mount Rogla about 1,150 m above sea level. The river passes Zreče, the town of Slovenske Konjice, the ruins of the fort at Zbelovo, Poljčane, Makole, Štatenberg Castle, Majšperk, and Videm pri Ptuju, where it merges with the Drava. Its main tributary is the Polskava River.

The Dravinja is the best-preserved lowland river in Slovenia and has been protected as part of the European Natura 2000 network. In addition, the river is distinguished by the Pečnik Mill, which has been proclaimed an ethnological monument.
