= Dolenja Lepa Vas =

- Location in Slovenia
- Coordinates: 45°58′11.89″N 15°25′17.15″E
- Country: Slovenia
- Traditional region: Lower Carniola
- Statistical region: Lower Sava
- Municipality: Krško

Area
  - Total: 0.28 km^{2} (0.11 sq mi)
- Elevation: 370.2 m (1,215 ft)

Population (2002)
  - Total: 15
- Postal code: 8270

Dolenja Lepa Vas (pronounced [dɔˈleːnja ˈleːpa ˈʋaːs]; Slovene: Dolenja Lepa vas, German: Unterschöndorf) is a small settlement in the hills south of Gornje Pijavško in the Municipality of Krško in eastern Slovenia. The area is part of the traditional region of Lower Carniola and is now included in the Lower Sava Statistical Region.
