= Brezje pri Senušah =

Brezje pri Senušah Brezje (until 1953)
- Location in Slovenia
- Coordinates: 45°56′14.73″N 15°26′16.15″E
- Country: Slovenia
- Traditional region: Lower Carniola
- Statistical region: Lower Sava
- Municipality: Krško

Area
  - Total: 1.82 km^{2} (0.70 sq mi)
- Elevation: 185.2 m (608 ft)

Population (2002)
  - Total: 80

Brezje pri Senušah (pronounced [ˈbɾeːzjɛ pɾi sɛˈnuːʃax]) is a small settlement between Leskovec pri Krškem and Senuše in the Municipality of Krško in eastern Slovenia. The area is part of the traditional region of Lower Carniola. It is now included with the rest of the municipality in the Lower Sava Statistical Region.

== Name ==
Brezje pri Senušah was attested in written sources as Pirch in 1352, Pirkg in 1442, and Pirkch in 1445. The name of the settlement was changed from Brezje to Brezje pri Senušah in 1953.

== Cultural heritage ==
A prehistoric Early Iron Age burial ground of five graves has been found in the settlement.
