= Ivandol =

Ivandol may refer to:

- Ivandol, Slovenia, a village near Krško
- Ivandol, Croatia, a village near Brestovac
