= Gorenje Dole, Krško =

Gorenje Dole
- Location in Slovenia
- Coordinates: 45°58′53.5″N 15°24′36.58″E
- Country: Slovenia
- Traditional region: Lower Carniola
- Statistical region: Lower Sava
- Municipality: Krško

Area
  - Total: 0.35 km^{2} (0.14 sq mi)
- Elevation: 321.9 m (1,056 ft)

Population (2002)
  - Total: 6
- Postal code: 8270

Gorenje Dole (pronounced [ɡɔˈɾeːnjɛ ˈdoːlɛ]; German: Oberdule) is a small settlement in the hills above Gornje Pijavško in the Municipality of Krško in eastern Slovenia. The area is part of the traditional region of Lower Carniola. It is now included in the Lower Sava Statistical Region.
