= Črešnjice nad Pijavškim =

Črešnjice nad Pijavškim Črešnjice (until 1953)
- Location in Slovenia
- Coordinates: 45°58′29.88″N 15°24′29.9″E
- Country: Slovenia
- Traditional region: Lower Carniola
- Statistical region: Lower Sava
- Municipality: Krško

Area
  - Total: 0.87 km^{2} (0.34 sq mi)
- Elevation: 342.1 m (1,122 ft)

Population (2002)
  - Total: 27
- Postal code: 8270

Črešnjice nad Pijavškim (pronounced [ˈtʃɾeːʃnjitsɛ nat piˈjaːu̯ʃkim]; German: Kerschdorf) is a small settlement in the hills above Gornje Pijavško on the right bank of the Sava River in the Municipality of Krško in eastern Slovenia. The area is part of the traditional region of Lower Carniola. It is now included with the rest of the municipality in the Lower Sava Statistical Region.

== Name ==
The name of the settlement was changed from Črešnjice to Črešnjice nad Pijavškim in 1953. In the past the German name was Kerschdorf.
