= Nemška Vas, Krško =

Nemška Vas
- Location in Slovenia
- Coordinates: 45°57′19.37″N 15°25′30.68″E
- Country: Slovenia
- Traditional region: Lower Carniola
- Statistical region: Lower Sava
- Municipality: Krško

Area
  - Total: 0.67 km^{2} (0.26 sq mi)
- Elevation: 360.3 m (1,182 ft)

Population (2002)
  - Total: 34
- Postal code: 8273

Nemška Vas (pronounced [ˈneːmʃka ˈʋaːs]; Slovene: Nemška vas, German: Deutschdorf) is a village in the hills west of Leskovec pri Krškem in the Municipality of Krško in eastern Slovenia. The area is part of the traditional region of Lower Carniola. It is now included with the rest of the municipality in the Lower Sava Statistical Region.

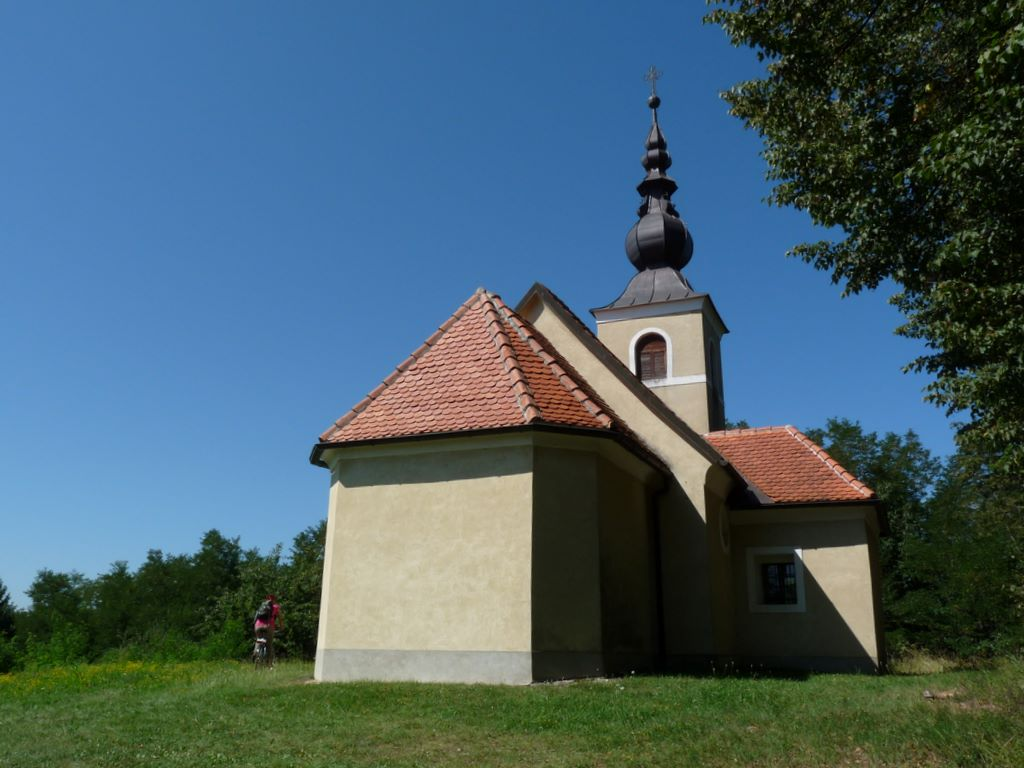
St. Stephen's Church

The local church, built on a hill east of the settlement, is dedicated to Saint Stephen (Slovene: sveti Štefan) and belongs to the Parish of Leskovec pri Krškem. It is a medieval building that was rebuilt in the Romanesque style in the 18th century.
