= Površje, Krško =

Površje
- Location in Slovenia
- Coordinates: 45°55′30.68″N 15°21′40.09″E
- Country: Slovenia
- Traditional region: Lower Carniola
- Statistical region: Lower Sava
- Municipality: Krško

Area
  - Total: 1.94 km^{2} (0.75 sq mi)
- Elevation: 210.1 m (689 ft)

Population (2002)
  - Total: 54
- Postal code: 8274

Površje (pronounced [pɔˈʋəɾʃjɛ]; German: Powerschje) is a settlement west of Raka in the Municipality of Krško in eastern Slovenia. The area is part of the traditional region of Lower Carniola. It is now included with the rest of the municipality in the Lower Sava Statistical Region.

There is a small chapel-shrine in the settlement dedicated to the Virgin Mary. It was built in 1923.
