= Planina v Podbočju =

Planina v Podbočju Planina (until 1953)
- Location in Slovenia
- Coordinates: 45°49′48.23″N 15°30′25.18″E
- Country: Slovenia
- Traditional region: Lower Carniola
- Statistical region: Lower Sava
- Municipality: Krško

Area
  - Total: 1.7 km^{2} (0.66 sq mi)
- Elevation: 678.6 m (2,226 ft)

Population (2002)
  - Total: 33

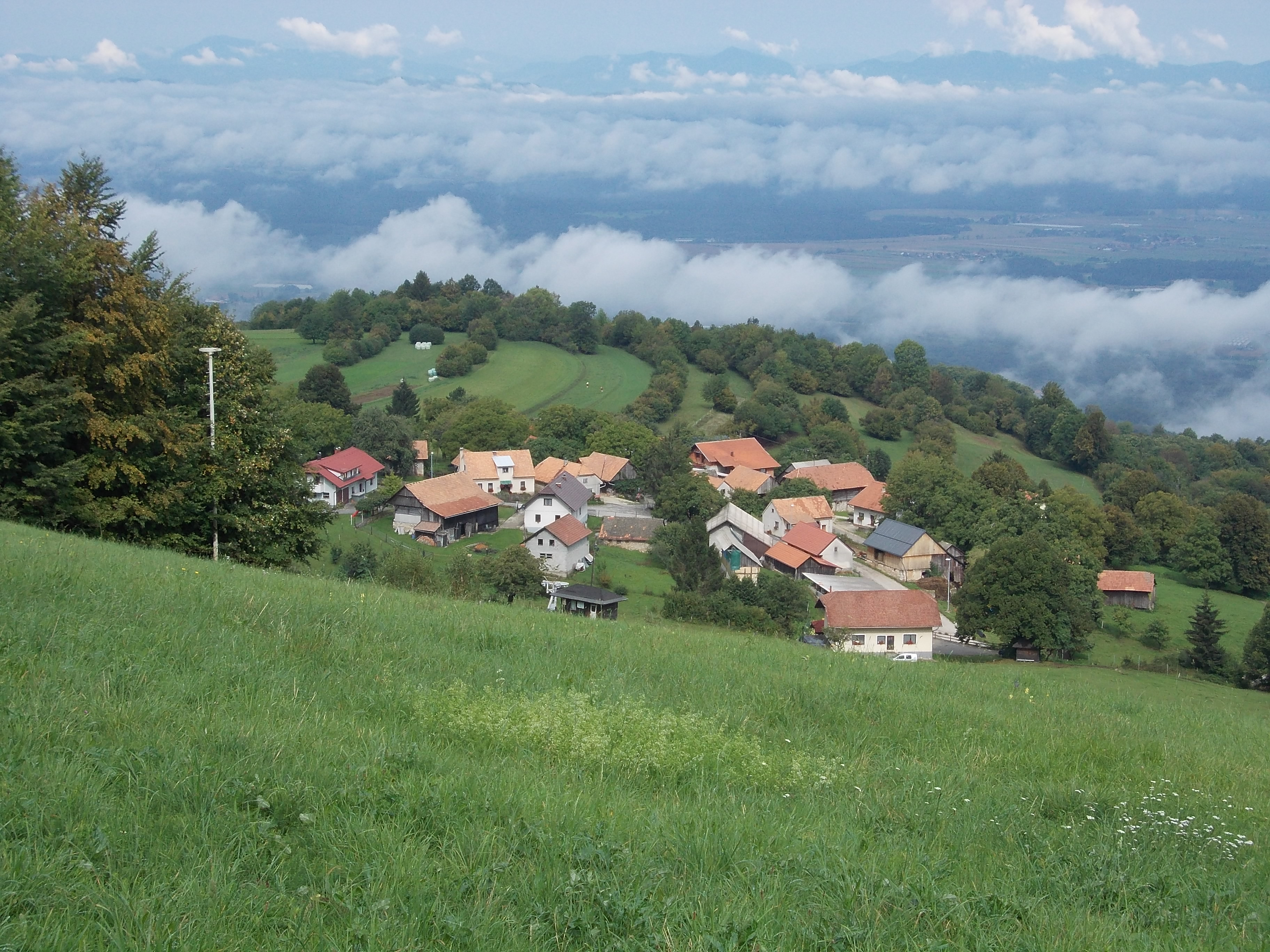
Partisan commemoration 2018 in Planina v Podbočju

Planina v Podbočju (pronounced [plaˈnìːna ʍ pɔdˈbóːtʃju]) is a remote small village in the Gorjanci Mountains in the Municipality of Krško in eastern Slovenia, right on the border with Croatia. The area is part of the traditional region of Lower Carniola. It is now included in the Lower Sava Statistical Region.

== Name ==
The name of the settlement was changed from Planina to Planina v Podbočju in 1953.

== History ==
Between 14 and 15 September 1942, during the Second World War, the village was burned to the ground and 34 male villagers were executed in the nearby forest by the Ustaše. There is a monument with a list of names of the dead in the village. It is a stone block with a statue of a Partisan on top, unveiled in 1953.
