= Vrh pri Površju =

Vrh pri Površju Vrh (until 1953)
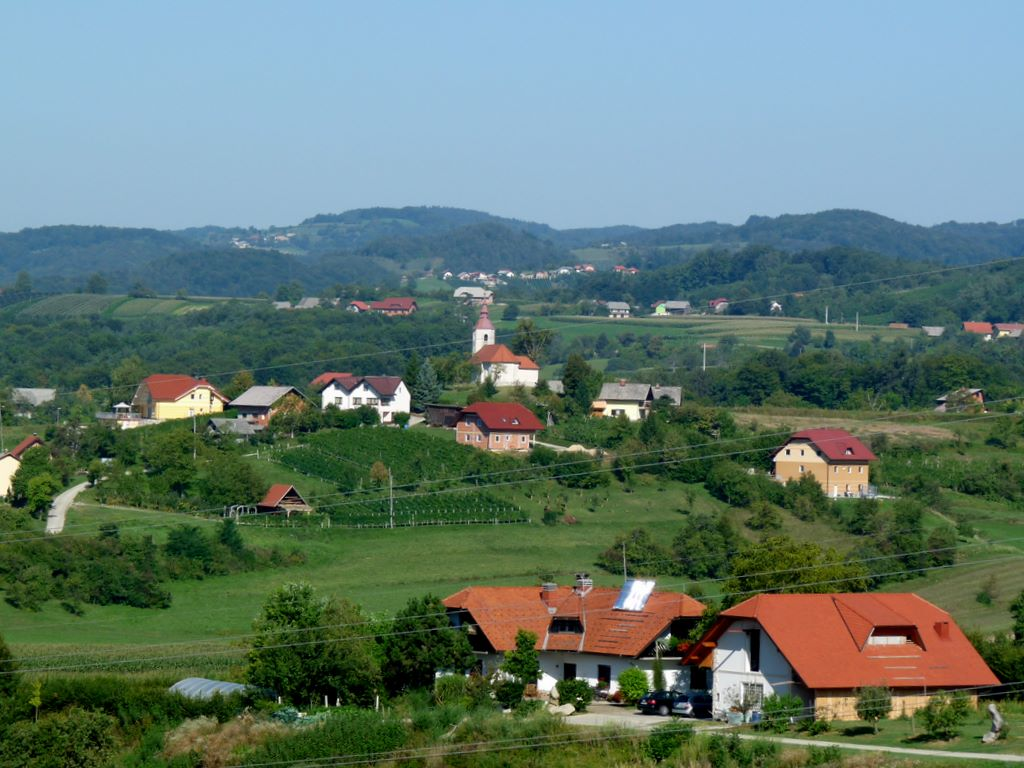

- Location in Slovenia
- Coordinates: 45°55′22.81″N 15°22′8.81″E
- Country: Slovenia
- Traditional region: Lower Carniola
- Statistical region: Lower Sava
- Municipality: Krško

Area
  - Total: 0.53 km^{2} (0.20 sq mi)
- Elevation: 199.7 m (655 ft)

Population (2002)
  - Total: 31
- Postal code: 8274

Vrh pri Površju (pronounced [ˈʋəɾx pɾi pɔˈʋəɾʃju]) is a settlement west of Raka in the Municipality of Krško in eastern Slovenia. The area is part of the traditional region of Lower Carniola. It is now included with the rest of the municipality in the Lower Sava Statistical Region.

== Name ==
The name of the settlement was changed from Vrh to Vrh pri Površju in 1953.

== Church ==
The local church is dedicated to Saint Agnes (Slovene: sveta Neža) and belongs to the Parish of Raka. It is a Baroque church, built in the 18th century. Its belfry was built in 1809.
