= Cirje =

- Location in Slovenia
- Coordinates: 45°55′25.88″N 15°23′0.36″E
- Country: Slovenia
- Traditional region: Lower Carniola
- Statistical region: Lower Sava
- Municipality: Krško

Area
  - Total: 0.73 km^{2} (0.28 sq mi)
- Elevation: 232.5 m (763 ft)

Population (2002)
  - Total: 72
- Postal code: 8274

Cirje (pronounced [ˈtsiːɾjɛ]) is a settlement south of Raka in the Municipality of Krško in eastern Slovenia. The area is part of the traditional region of Lower Carniola. It is now included with the rest of the municipality in the Lower Sava Statistical Region.
