= Dolenja Vas pri Krškem =

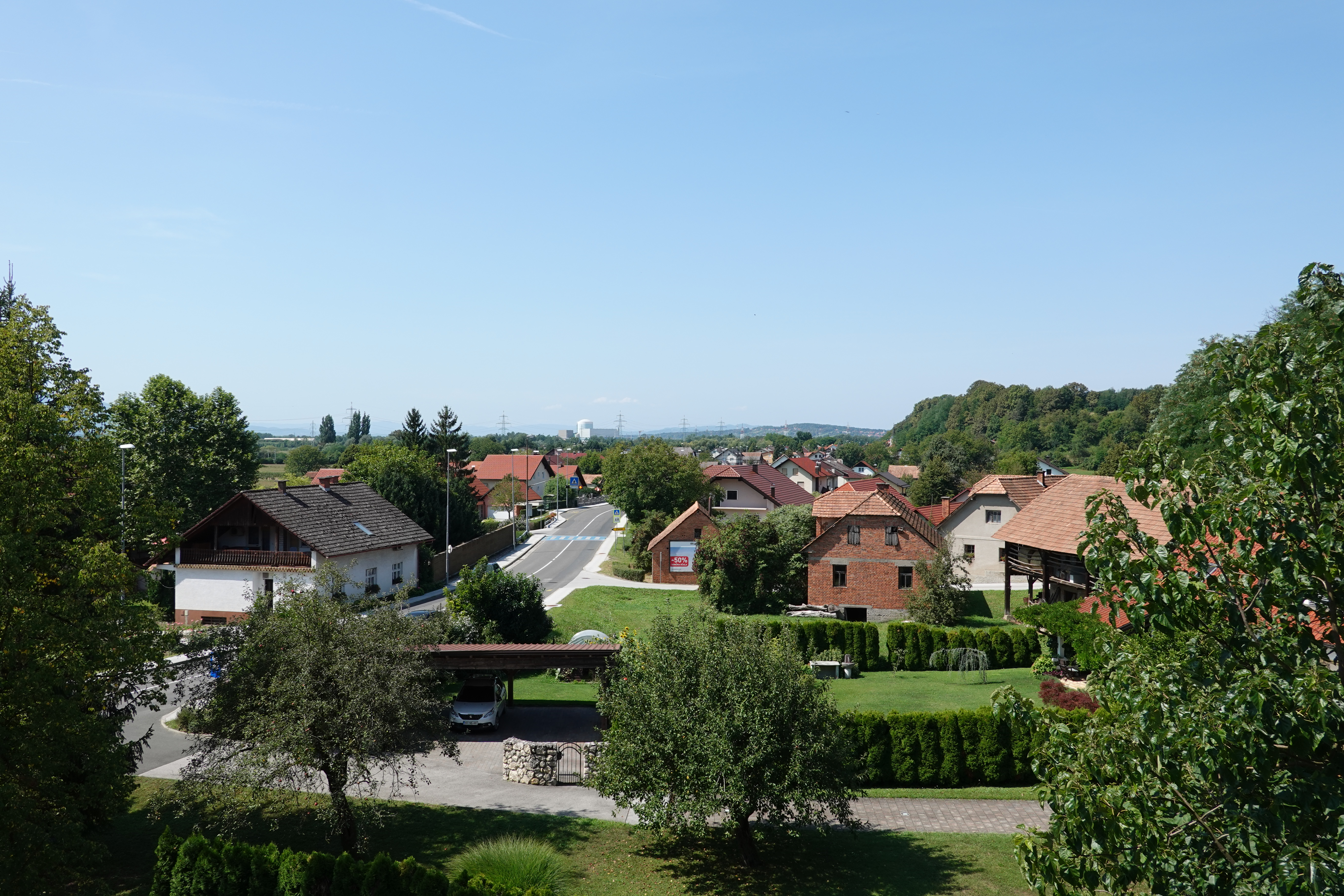

- Location in Slovenia
- Coordinates: 45°56′53.18″N 15°32′53.01″E
- Country: Slovenia
- Traditional region: Styria
- Statistical region: Lower Sava
- Municipality: Krško

Area
  - Total: 2.66 km^{2} (1.03 sq mi)
- Elevation: 158.8 m (521 ft)

Population (2002)
  - Total: 223
- Postal code: 8270

Dolenja Vas pri Krškem (pronounced [dɔˈleːnja ˈʋaːs pɾi ˈkəɾʃkɛm]; Slovene: Dolenja vas pri Krškem) is a settlement east of Krško in eastern Slovenia. The area is part of the traditional region of Styria. It is now included with the rest of the municipality in the Lower Sava Statistical Region.

The local church is dedicated to Mary Help of Christians (Slovene: Marija Pomočnica) and belongs to the Parish of Videm–Krško. It is a Baroque church, built in the early 16th century. Its interior was refurbished in 1878.
