= Veliki Koren =

- Location in Slovenia
- Coordinates: 45°53′57.34″N 15°23′3.29″E
- Country: Slovenia
- Traditional region: Lower Carniola
- Statistical region: Lower Sava
- Municipality: Krško

Area
  - Total: 0.6 km^{2} (0.23 sq mi)
- Elevation: 190 m (620 ft)

Population (2012)
  - Total: 0

Veliki Koren (pronounced [ˈʋeːliki ˈkoːɾɛn]; German: Großwurzen) is an uninhabited settlement in the Municipality of Krško in eastern Slovenia. The area is part of the traditional region of Lower Carniola. It is now included with the rest of the municipality in the Lower Sava Statistical Region.

== History ==
Veliki Koren had a population of 29 in 1900, but is now uninhabited. In the fall of 1941, German forces evicted the residents of the village to make room for the planned resettlement of Gottschee Germans. By 1971 only two houses remained in the village, and these were already slated for demolition because of the gradual expansion of a mine for diatomaceous earth.
