= Kalce–Naklo =

Kalce–Naklo Kalce - Naklo
- Location in Slovenia
- Coordinates: 45°52′44.96″N 15°27′6.9″E
- Country: Slovenia
- Traditional region: Lower Carniola
- Statistical region: Lower Sava
- Municipality: Krško

Area
  - Total: 2.24 km^{2} (0.86 sq mi)
- Elevation: 153.9 m (505 ft)

Population (2002)
  - Total: 157
- Postal code: 8312

Kalce–Naklo (pronounced [ˈkaːu̯tsɛ ˈnaːklɔ]; Slovene: Kalce - Naklo) is a village in the flat plains between the Sava and Krka rivers, south of Leskovec pri Krškem in the Municipality of Krško in eastern Slovenia. As its compound name suggests, it is made up of two parts: Kalce (locally known as Tkavce) to the north and Naklo to the south. The area is part of the traditional region of Lower Carniola. It is now included with the rest of the municipality in the Lower Sava Statistical Region.

There is a small chapel-shrine in the settlement, dedicated to the Virgin Mary. It was built in the early 20th century.
