= Pristava ob Krki =

Pristava ob Krki Pristava (until 1953)
- Location in Slovenia
- Coordinates: 45°52′6.67″N 15°29′57.23″E
- Country: Slovenia
- Traditional region: Lower Carniola
- Statistical region: Lower Sava
- Municipality: Krško

Area
  - Total: 0.77 km^{2} (0.30 sq mi)
- Elevation: 149 m (489 ft)

Population (2002)
  - Total: 37
- Postal code: 8312

Pristava ob Krki (pronounced [pɾiˈstaːʋa ɔp ˈkəɾki]) is a small village on the right bank of the Krka River east of Podbočje in the Municipality of Krško in eastern Slovenia. The area is part of the traditional region of Lower Carniola. It is now included in the Lower Sava Statistical Region.

== Name ==
The name of the settlement was changed from Pristava to Pristava ob Krki in 1953.
