= Volovnik =

- Location in Slovenia
- Coordinates: 45°57′9.24″N 15°27′15.09″E
- Country: Slovenia
- Traditional region: Lower Carniola
- Statistical region: Lower Sava
- Municipality: Krško

Area
  - Total: 1.06 km^{2} (0.41 sq mi)
- Elevation: 335.5 m (1,101 ft)

Population (2002)
  - Total: 34
- Postal code: 8273

Volovnik (pronounced [ʋɔˈloːu̯nik]) is a settlement in the hills northwest of Leskovec in the Municipality of Krško in eastern Slovenia. The area is part of the traditional region of Lower Carniola. It is now included with the rest of the municipality in the Lower Sava Statistical Region.
