= Raztez =

- Location in Slovenia
- Coordinates: 46°0′40.44″N 15°31′2.3″E
- Country: Slovenia
- Traditional region: Styria
- Statistical region: Lower Sava
- Municipality: Krško

Area
  - Total: 2.65 km^{2} (1.02 sq mi)
- Elevation: 309.3 m (1,015 ft)

Population (2002)
  - Total: 101
- Postal code: 8280

Raztez (pronounced [ˈɾaːstɛs]) is a dispersed settlement in the hills northeast of Brestanica in the Municipality of Krško in eastern Slovenia. The area is part of the traditional region of Styria. It is now included in the Lower Sava Statistical Region.
