= Gržeča Vas =

- Location in Slovenia
- Coordinates: 45°54′18.7″N 15°26′33.33″E
- Country: Slovenia
- Traditional region: Lower Carniola
- Statistical region: Lower Sava
- Municipality: Krško

Area
  - Total: 0.89 km^{2} (0.34 sq mi)
- Elevation: 155.5 m (510 ft)

Population (2002)
  - Total: 102
- Postal code: 8273

Gržeča Vas (pronounced [ɡəɾˈʒeːtʃa ˈʋaːs]; Slovene: Gržeča vas, in older sources also Gršeča Vas, German: Gerschetschendorf) is a village west of Veliki Podlog in the Municipality of Krško in eastern Slovenia. The area is part of the traditional region of Lower Carniola. It is now included with the rest of the municipality in the Lower Sava Statistical Region.
