= Gorica, Krško =

Gorica
- Location in Slovenia
- Coordinates: 45°54′1.96″N 15°28′46.82″E
- Country: Slovenia
- Traditional region: Lower Carniola
- Statistical region: Lower Sava
- Municipality: Krško

Area
  - Total: 4.63 km^{2} (1.79 sq mi)
- Elevation: 161 m (528 ft)

Population (2002)
  - Total: 287
- Postal code: 8273

Gorica (pronounced [ɡɔˈɾiːtsa]) is a village south of Drnovo in the Municipality of Krško in eastern Slovenia. The area is part of the traditional region of Lower Carniola. It is now included in the Lower Sava Statistical Region.

The local church is dedicated to Saint Paul and belongs to the Parish of Leskovec pri Krškem. It has a rectangular Romanesque nave, which was extended in the 18th century when a vaulted sanctuary was added.

A number of Roman graves and an aedicula have been found in the area, indicating the southern extent of the nearby Nevidonium necropolis. Nearby a Roman potter's kiln was also uncovered.
