= Planina pri Raki =

Planina pri Raki Planina (until 1953)
- Location in Slovenia
- Coordinates: 45°57′8.7″N 15°22′19.27″E
- Country: Slovenia
- Traditional region: Lower Carniola
- Statistical region: Lower Sava
- Municipality: Krško

Area
  - Total: 1.59 km^{2} (0.61 sq mi)
- Elevation: 352.3 m (1,156 ft)

Population (2002)
  - Total: 51

Planina pri Raki (pronounced [plaˈnìːna pɾi ˈɾàːki]) is a small settlement in the hills north of Raka in the Municipality of Krško in eastern Slovenia. The area is part of the traditional region of Lower Carniola. It is now included with the rest of the municipality in the Lower Sava Statistical Region.

== Name ==
The name of the settlement was changed from Planina to Planina pri Raki in 1953.
