= Pleterje, Krško =

Pleterje
- Location in Slovenia
- Coordinates: 45°58′9.28″N 15°31′48.73″E
- Country: Slovenia
- Traditional region: Styria
- Statistical region: Lower Sava
- Municipality: Krško

Area
  - Total: 2.6 km^{2} (1.0 sq mi)
- Elevation: 285.2 m (936 ft)

Population (2002)
  - Total: 156
- Postal code: 8272

Pleterje (pronounced [ˈpleːtɛɾjɛ]) is a settlement in the hills northeast of the town of Krško in eastern Slovenia. The area is part of the traditional region of Styria. It is now included with the rest of the municipality in the Lower Sava Statistical Region.
