= Brod v Podbočju =

Brod v Podbočju Brod (until 1955)
- Location in Slovenia
- Coordinates: 45°51′55.03″N 15°27′16.23″E
- Country: Slovenia
- Traditional region: Lower Carniola
- Statistical region: Lower Sava
- Municipality: Krško

Area
  - Total: 0.7 km^{2} (0.27 sq mi)
- Elevation: 151.2 m (496 ft)

Population (2002)
  - Total: 99
- Postal code: 8312

Brod v Podbočju (pronounced [ˈbɾóːt ʍ pɔdˈbóːtʃju]) is a small village on the left bank of the Krka River, opposite Podbočje in the Municipality of Krško in eastern Slovenia. The area is part of the traditional region of Lower Carniola. It is now included with the rest of the municipality in the Lower Sava Statistical Region.

== Name ==
The name of the settlement was changed from Brod to Brod v Podbočju in 1955.

== Cultural heritage ==
A wooden bridge from the early 20th century, made from oak beams, connects the village with the right bank of the river.
