= Brezovska Gora =

- Location in Slovenia
- Coordinates: 45°56′45″N 15°25′37.85″E
- Country: Slovenia
- Traditional region: Lower Carniola
- Statistical region: Lower Sava
- Municipality: Krško

Area
  - Total: 1.4 km^{2} (0.54 sq mi)
- Elevation: 247.1 m (811 ft)

Population (2002)
  - Total: 45

Brezovska Gora (pronounced [ˈbɾeːzɔu̯ska ˈɡɔːɾa]; German: Birkenberg) is a small settlement in the hills west of Krško in eastern Slovenia. The area is part of the traditional region of Lower Carniola and is now included in the Lower Sava Statistical Region.
