= Ravne pri Zdolah =

Ravne pri Zdolah Ravne (until 1953)
- Location in Slovenia
- Coordinates: 45°59′27.08″N 15°32′44.31″E
- Country: Slovenia
- Traditional region: Styria
- Statistical region: Lower Sava
- Municipality: Krško

Area
  - Total: 4.35 km^{2} (1.68 sq mi)
- Elevation: 364.9 m (1,197 ft)

Population (2002)
  - Total: 182
- Postal code: 8270

Ravne pri Zdolah (pronounced [ˈɾáːwnɛ pɾi ˈzdoːlax]) is a settlement in the hills north of Krško in eastern Slovenia. The area is part of the traditional region of Styria. It is now included in the Lower Sava Statistical Region.

== Name ==
The name of the settlement was changed from Ravne to Ravne pri Zdolah in 1953.

== Cultural heritage ==
There is a small chapel-shrine in the settlement dedicated to the Virgin Mary. It was built in 1927.
