= Dolenji Leskovec =

- Location in Slovenia
- Coordinates: 45°59′53.15″N 15°27′15.05″E
- Country: Slovenia
- Traditional region: Styria
- Statistical region: Lower Sava
- Municipality: Krško

Area
  - Total: 4.95 km^{2} (1.91 sq mi)
- Elevation: 251.1 m (824 ft)

Population (2002)
  - Total: 285
- Postal code: 8280

Dolenji Leskovec (pronounced [dɔˈleːnji lɛˈskɔːʋəts] or [dɔˈleːnji lɛˈskoːʋəts], German: Haselbach) is a settlement west of Brestanica in the Municipality of Krško in eastern Slovenia. The area is part of the traditional region of Styria. It is now included with the rest of the municipality in the Lower Sava Statistical Region.

== Name ==
The name of the settlement was changed from Dolnji Leskovec to Dolenji Leskovec in 1990. It was known as Haselbach in German in the past.

== Cultural Heritage ==
There is a small chapel-shrine in the settlement dedicated to the Sacred Heart of Jesus. It was built in the early 20th century.
