= Mrčna Sela =

Mrčna Sela Mrčna sela
- Location in Slovenia
- Coordinates: 46°3′16.93″N 15°30′54.46″E
- Country: Slovenia
- Traditional region: Styria
- Statistical region: Lower Sava
- Municipality: Krško

Area
  - Total: 3.82 km^{2} (1.47 sq mi)
- Elevation: 554.6 m (1,820 ft)

Population (2002)
  - Total: 152
- Postal code: 8282

Mrčna Sela (pronounced [ˈməɾtʃna ˈseːla] or [ˈməɾtʃna ˈsɛːla]; Slovene: Mrčna sela, German: Mertschnasela) is a dispersed settlement in the hills northeast of Senovo in the Municipality of Krško in eastern Slovenia. The area is part of the traditional region of Styria. It is now included with the rest of the municipality in the Lower Sava Statistical Region.

There is a small empty chapel-shrine in the settlement. It was built in the late 19th century.
