= Slivje, Krško =

Slivje
- Location in Slovenia
- Coordinates: 45°51′20.46″N 15°26′53.23″E
- Country: Slovenia
- Traditional region: Lower Carniola
- Statistical region: Lower Sava
- Municipality: Krško

Area
  - Total: 0.72 km^{2} (0.28 sq mi)
- Elevation: 160.6 m (527 ft)

Population (2002)
  - Total: 36
- Postal code: 8312

Slivje (pronounced [ˈsliːu̯jɛ]) is a small settlement on the right bank of the Krka River southwest of Podbočje in the Municipality of Krško in eastern Slovenia. The area is part of the traditional region of Lower Carniola. It is now included with the rest of the municipality in the Lower Sava Statistical Region.
