= Gradišče pri Raki =

Gradišče pri Raki Gradišče (until 1953)
- Location in Slovenia
- Coordinates: 45°56′17.09″N 15°22′52.35″E
- Country: Slovenia
- Traditional region: Lower Carniola
- Statistical region: Lower Sava
- Municipality: Krško

Area
  - Total: 0.54 km^{2} (0.21 sq mi)
- Elevation: 285.6 m (937 ft)

Population (2002)
  - Total: 0
- Postal code: 8274

Gradišče pri Raki (pronounced [ɡɾaˈdiːʃtʃɛ pɾi ˈɾaːki]) is a small settlement north of Raka in the Municipality of Krško in eastern Slovenia. It no longer has any permanent residents. The area is part of the traditional region of Lower Carniola. It is now included with the rest of the municipality in the Lower Sava Statistical Region.

== Name ==
The name of the settlement was changed from Gradišče to Gradišče pri Raki in 1953.
