= Dovško =

- Location in Slovenia
- Coordinates: 46°1′36.01″N 15°27′50.3″E
- Country: Slovenia
- Traditional region: Styria
- Statistical region: Lower Sava
- Municipality: Krško

Area
  - Total: 2.16 km^{2} (0.83 sq mi)
- Elevation: 244.8 m (803 ft)

Population (2002)
  - Total: 236
- Postal code: 8281

Dovško (pronounced [ˈdoːu̯ʃkɔ]) is a settlement west of Senovo in the Municipality of Krško in eastern Slovenia. The area is part of the traditional region of Styria. It is now included with the rest of the municipality in the Lower Sava Statistical Region.

The local church is built on Podgora Hill between Dovško and Šedem. Locally it is referred to as Šedem Church because the road up the hill leads from Šedem, but technically it is built on the territory of Dovško. It is dedicated to Saint James and belongs to the Parish of Senovo. It is an originally Romanesque building that was rebuilt in the late 17th century. The main altar dates to 1800.

== Gallery ==
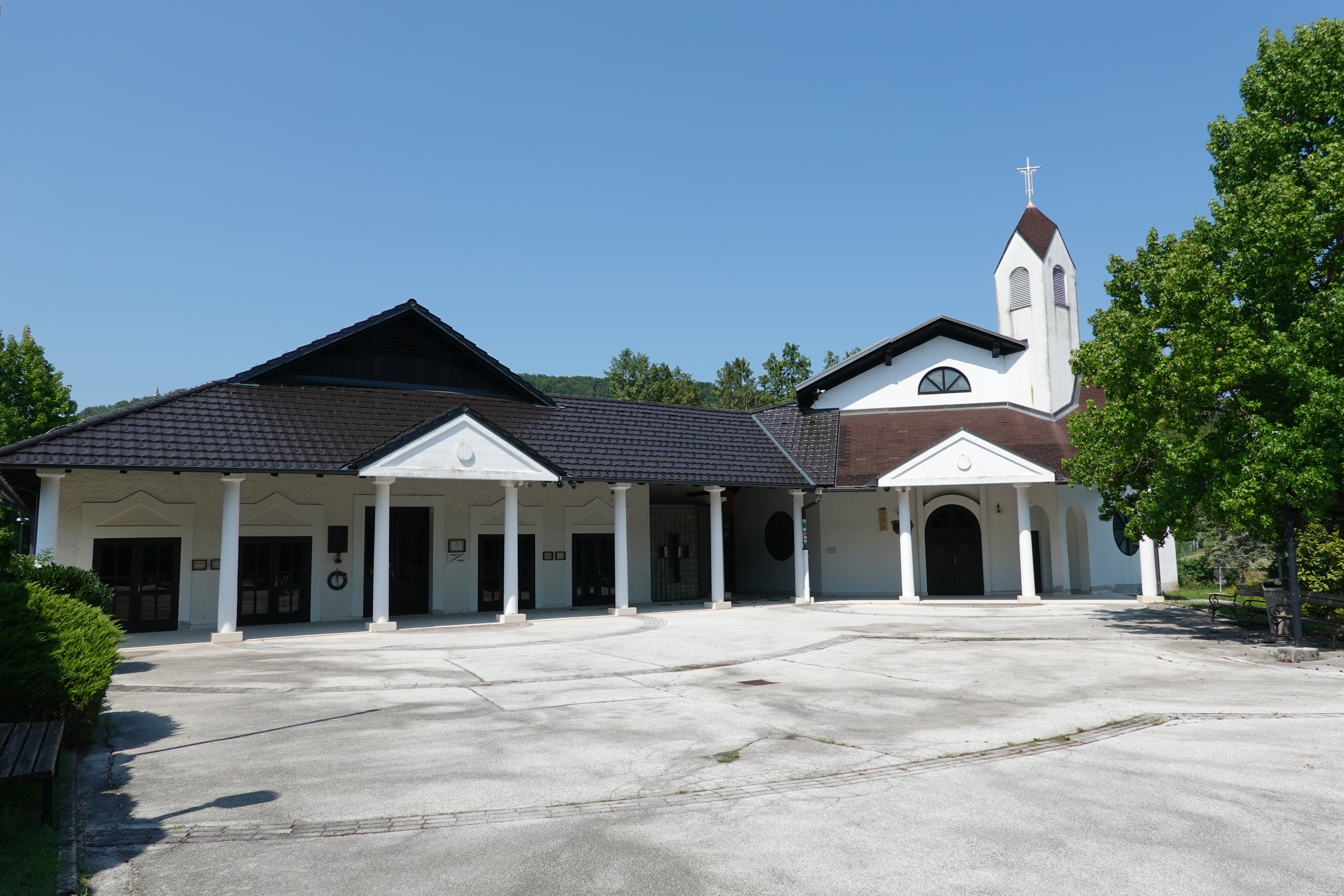
Dovško Cemetery
