= Srednje Arto =

- Location in Slovenia
- Coordinates: 45°58′39.88″N 15°24′40.2″E
- Country: Slovenia
- Traditional region: Lower Carniola
- Statistical region: Lower Sava
- Municipality: Krško

Area
  - Total: 0.74 km^{2} (0.29 sq mi)
- Elevation: 361 m (1,184 ft)

Population (2002)
  - Total: 19

Srednje Arto (pronounced [ˈsɾeːdnjɛ ˈaːɾtɔ]; German: Mitterarto) is a small settlement in the hills above the right bank of the Sava River in the Municipality of Krško in eastern Slovenia. The area is part of the traditional region of Lower Carniola. It is now included in the Lower Sava Statistical Region.
