= Jelše, Krško =

Jelše
- Location in Slovenia
- Coordinates: 45°53′58.23″N 15°28′10.13″E
- Country: Slovenia
- Traditional region: Lower Carniola
- Statistical region: Lower Sava
- Municipality: Krško

Area
  - Total: 1.62 km^{2} (0.63 sq mi)
- Elevation: 154.5 m (507 ft)

Population (2002)
  - Total: 117
- Postal code: 8270

Jelše (pronounced [ˈjeːu̯ʃɛ]) is a small settlement just south of the A2 motorway from Ljubljana to Zagreb in the Municipality of Krško in eastern Slovenia. The area is part of the traditional region of Lower Carniola. It is now included with the rest of the municipality in the Lower Sava Statistical Region.

== Notable people ==
Notable people that were born or lived in Jelše include:

- Jože Strgar (born 1929), former Ljubljana mayor
