= Dolenja Vas pri Raki =

Dolenja Vas pri Raki Dolenja Vas (until 1953)
- Location in Slovenia
- Coordinates: 45°55′8.31″N 15°21′46.44″E
- Country: Slovenia
- Traditional region: Lower Carniola
- Statistical region: Lower Sava
- Municipality: Krško

Area
  - Total: 0.66 km^{2} (0.25 sq mi)
- Elevation: 184.1 m (604 ft)

Population (2002)
  - Total: 56
- Postal code: 8274

Dolenja Vas pri Raki (pronounced [dɔˈleːnja ˈʋaːs pɾi ˈɾaːki]; Slovene: Dolenja vas pri Raki, German: Niederdorf) is a settlement southwest of Raka in the Municipality of Krško in eastern Slovenia. The area is part of the traditional region of Lower Carniola. It is now included with the rest of the municipality in the Lower Sava Statistical Region.

== Name ==
The name of the settlement was changed from Dolenja vas to Dolenja vas pri Raki in 1953. In the past the German name was Niederdorf.
