= Apnenik pri Velikem Trnu =

Apnenik pri Velikem Trnu Apnenik (until 1953)
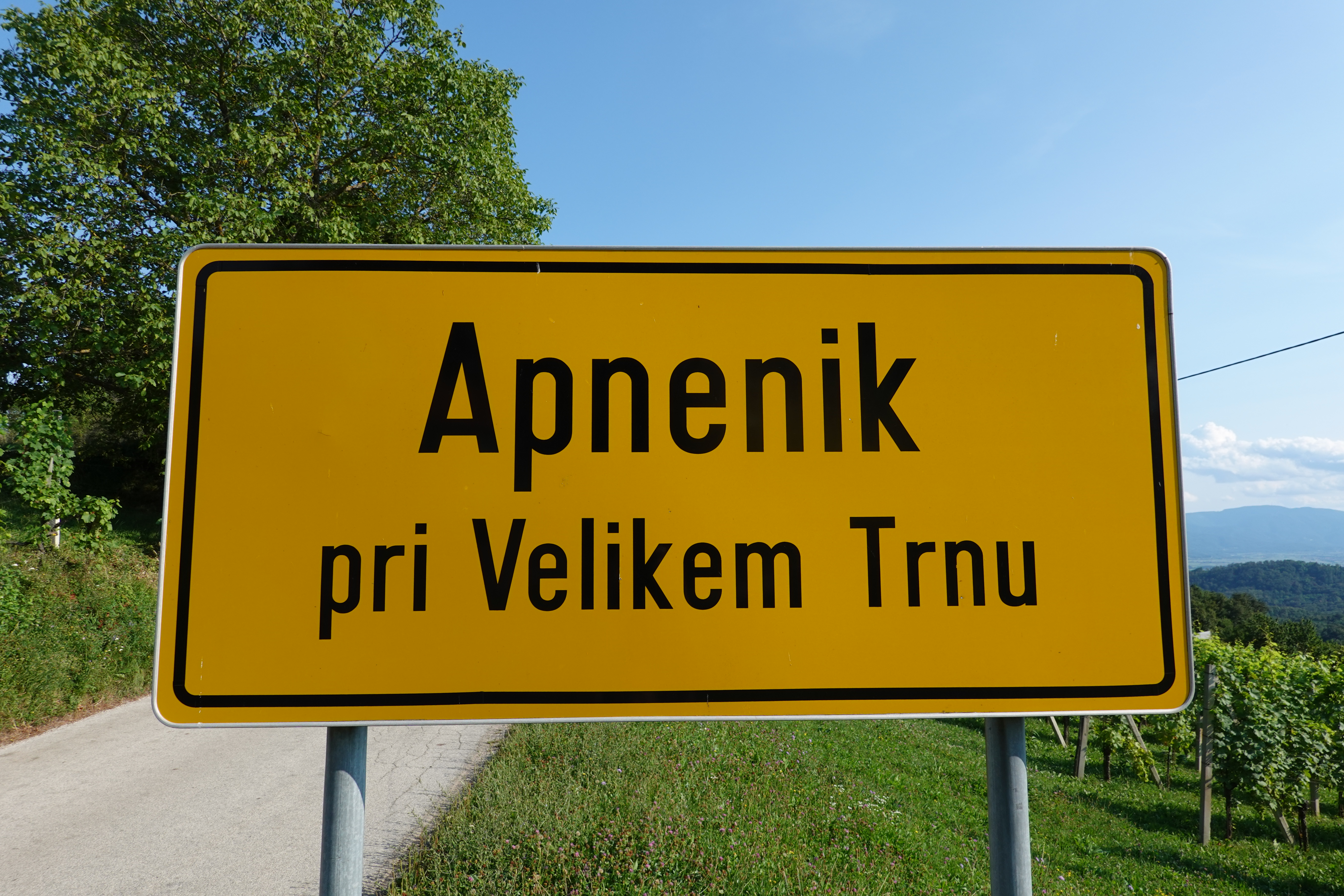

- Location in Slovenia
- Coordinates: 45°57′23.3″N 15°23′47.15″E
- Country: Slovenia
- Traditional region: Lower Carniola
- Statistical region: Lower Sava
- Municipality: Krško

Area
  - Total: 0.90 km^{2} (0.35 sq mi)
- Elevation: 378.7 m (1,242 ft)

Population (2002)
  - Total: 24

Apnenik pri Velikem Trnu (pronounced [aˈpneːnik pɾi ˈʋeːlikɛm ˈtəɾnu]) is a settlement in the hills east of Krško in eastern Slovenia. The area is part of the traditional region of Lower Carniola. It is now included with the rest of the municipality in the Lower Sava Statistical Region.

== Name ==
The name of the settlement was changed from Apnenik to Apnenik pri Velikem Trnu in 1953.
