= Gorenji Leskovec =

- Location in Slovenia
- Coordinates: 46°1′39.3″N 15°24′48.97″E
- Country: Slovenia
- Traditional region: Styria
- Statistical region: Lower Sava
- Municipality: Krško

Area
  - Total: 2.85 km^{2} (1.10 sq mi)
- Elevation: 360.2 m (1,182 ft)

Population (2002)
  - Total: 89
- Postal code: 8283

Gorenji Leskovec (pronounced [ɡɔˈɾeːnji lɛˈskɔːʋəts] or [ɡɔˈɾeːnji lɛˈskoːʋəts]) is a settlement west of Senovo in the Municipality of Krško in eastern Slovenia. The area is part of the traditional region of Styria. It is now included in the Lower Sava Statistical Region.

The local church in the centre of the village is dedicated to Saint Anthony the Hermit and belongs to the Parish of Brestanica. It was built in the 17th century. In the 18th century the belfry and two side chapels were added.
