= Ardro pri Raki =

Ardro pri Raki Ardro (until 1953)
- Location in Slovenia
- Coordinates: 45°55′47.7″N 15°23′59″E
- Country: Slovenia
- Traditional region: Lower Carniola
- Statistical region: Lower Sava
- Municipality: Krško

Area
  - Total: 1.28 km^{2} (0.49 sq mi)
- Elevation: 219.6 m (720 ft)

Population (2002)
  - Total: 80

Ardro pri Raki (pronounced [ˈaːɾdɾɔ pɾi ˈɾaːki]) is a small settlement east of Raka in the Municipality of Krško in eastern Slovenia. The area is part of the traditional region of Lower Carniola. It is now included with the rest of the municipality in the Lower Sava Statistical Region.

== Name ==
Ardro pri Raki was attested in historical sources as Redern in 1420 and Reder in 1433. The name of the settlement was changed from Ardro to Ardro pri Raki in 1953.
