= Brezje pri Dovškem =

Brezje pri Dovškem Brezje (until 1953)
- Location in Slovenia
- Coordinates: 46°1′47.24″N 15°26′57.85″E
- Country: Slovenia
- Traditional region: Styria
- Statistical region: Lower Sava
- Municipality: Krško

Area
  - Total: 1.84 km^{2} (0.71 sq mi)
- Elevation: 326.3 m (1,071 ft)

Population (2002)
  - Total: 105

Brezje pri Dovškem (pronounced [ˈbɾeːzjɛ pɾi ˈdoːu̯ʃkɛm]) is a settlement in the hills north of Brestanica in the Municipality of Krško in eastern Slovenia. The area is part of the traditional region of Styria. It is now included with the rest of the municipality in the Lower Sava Statistical Region.

== Name ==
The name of the settlement was changed from Brezje to Brezje pri Dovškem in 1953.

== Church ==
The local church, built on a hill south of the main core of the settlement, is dedicated to Saint Paul. It belongs to the Parish of Senovo. It is a Baroque church built in the late 17th century.
