= Vrhulje =

- Location in Slovenia
- Coordinates: 45°57′12.36″N 15°24′58.12″E
- Country: Slovenia
- Traditional region: Lower Carniola
- Statistical region: Lower Sava
- Municipality: Krško

Area
  - Total: 1.01 km^{2} (0.39 sq mi)
- Elevation: 355 m (1,165 ft)

Population (2002)
  - Total: 31
- Postal code: 8270

Vrhulje (pronounced [ʋəɾˈxuːljɛ]) is a settlement in the hills northeast of Raka in the Municipality of Krško in eastern Slovenia. The area is part of the traditional region of Lower Carniola. It is now included with the rest of the municipality in the Lower Sava Statistical Region.
