= Anže, Krško =

Anže
- Location in Slovenia
- Coordinates: 45°59′27.19″N 15°31′12.77″E
- Country: Slovenia
- Traditional region: Styria
- Statistical region: Lower Sava
- Municipality: Krško

Area
  - Total: 2.92 km^{2} (1.13 sq mi)
- Elevation: 209.8 m (688 ft)

Population (2002)
  - Total: 121

Anže (pronounced [ˈaːnʒɛ]) is a settlement in the hills east of Brestanica in the Municipality of Krško in eastern Slovenia. The area is part of the traditional region of Styria. It is now included with the rest of the municipality in the Lower Sava Statistical Region.

There are two small chapel-shrines in the settlement. One, north of the settlement, dates to the late 19th century. The second, dedicated to Our Lady of Lourdes, to the south of the settlement, was built in 1996.
