= Senožete, Krško =

Senožete
- Location in Slovenia
- Coordinates: 45°58′16.83″N 15°26′22.23″E
- Country: Slovenia
- Traditional region: Lower Carniola
- Statistical region: Lower Sava
- Municipality: Krško

Area
  - Total: 0.92 km^{2} (0.36 sq mi)
- Elevation: 422.6 m (1,386 ft)

Population (2002)
  - Total: 22
- Postal code: 8270

Senožete (pronounced [sɛnɔˈʒeːtɛ]) is a small settlement in the hills west of Krško in eastern Slovenia. The area is part of the traditional region of Lower Carniola. It is now included in the Lower Sava Statistical Region.
