= Veniše =

- Location in Slovenia
- Coordinates: 45°55′43.89″N 15°27′56.64″E
- Country: Slovenia
- Traditional region: Lower Carniola
- Statistical region: Lower Sava
- Municipality: Krško

Area
  - Total: 1.56 km^{2} (0.60 sq mi)
- Elevation: 162.9 m (534 ft)

Population (2002)
  - Total: 229
- Postal code: 8273

Veniše (pronounced [ʋɛˈniːʃɛ]) is a settlement southwest of Leskovec in the Municipality of Krško in eastern Slovenia. The area is part of the traditional region of Lower Carniola. It is now included with the rest of the municipality in the Lower Sava Statistical Region.

There is a small chapel-shrine in the southwest of the village. It is dedicated to the Virgin Mary and was built in 1930.
