= Veliko Mraševo =

- Location in Slovenia
- Coordinates: 45°52′36.79″N 15°28′42.37″E
- Country: Slovenia
- Traditional region: Lower Carniola
- Statistical region: Lower Sava
- Municipality: Krško

Area
  - Total: 3.05 km^{2} (1.18 sq mi)
- Elevation: 151 m (495 ft)

Population (2002)
  - Total: 242
- Postal code: 8312

Veliko Mraševo (pronounced [ˈʋeːlikɔ ˈmɾaːʃɛʋɔ]; German: Großmraschewo) is a village on the left bank of the Krka River in the Municipality of Krško in eastern Slovenia. The area is part of the traditional region of Lower Carniola. It is now included with the rest of the municipality in the Lower Sava Statistical Region.

The local church is dedicated to Saint Peter and Paul and belongs to the Parish of Sveti Križ–Podbočje. It was built between 1924 and 1934.
