= Kališovec =

- Location in Slovenia
- Coordinates: 46°1′36.25″N 15°25′25.69″E
- Country: Slovenia
- Traditional region: Styria
- Statistical region: Lower Sava
- Municipality: Krško

Area
  - Total: 1.48 km^{2} (0.57 sq mi)
- Elevation: 322.3 m (1,057 ft)

Population (2002)
  - Total: 43
- Postal code: 8281

Kališovec (pronounced [kaˈliːʃɔʋəts]) is a settlement west of Senovo in the Municipality of Krško in eastern Slovenia. The area is part of the traditional region of Styria. It is now included with the rest of the municipality in the Lower Sava Statistical Region.

There is a small chapel-shrine in the settlement, dedicated to the Virgin Mary. It was built in the late 19th century.
