= Urban Municipality of Krško =

Municipality of Slovenia

Urban Municipality of Krško Mestna občina Krško
- Municipality
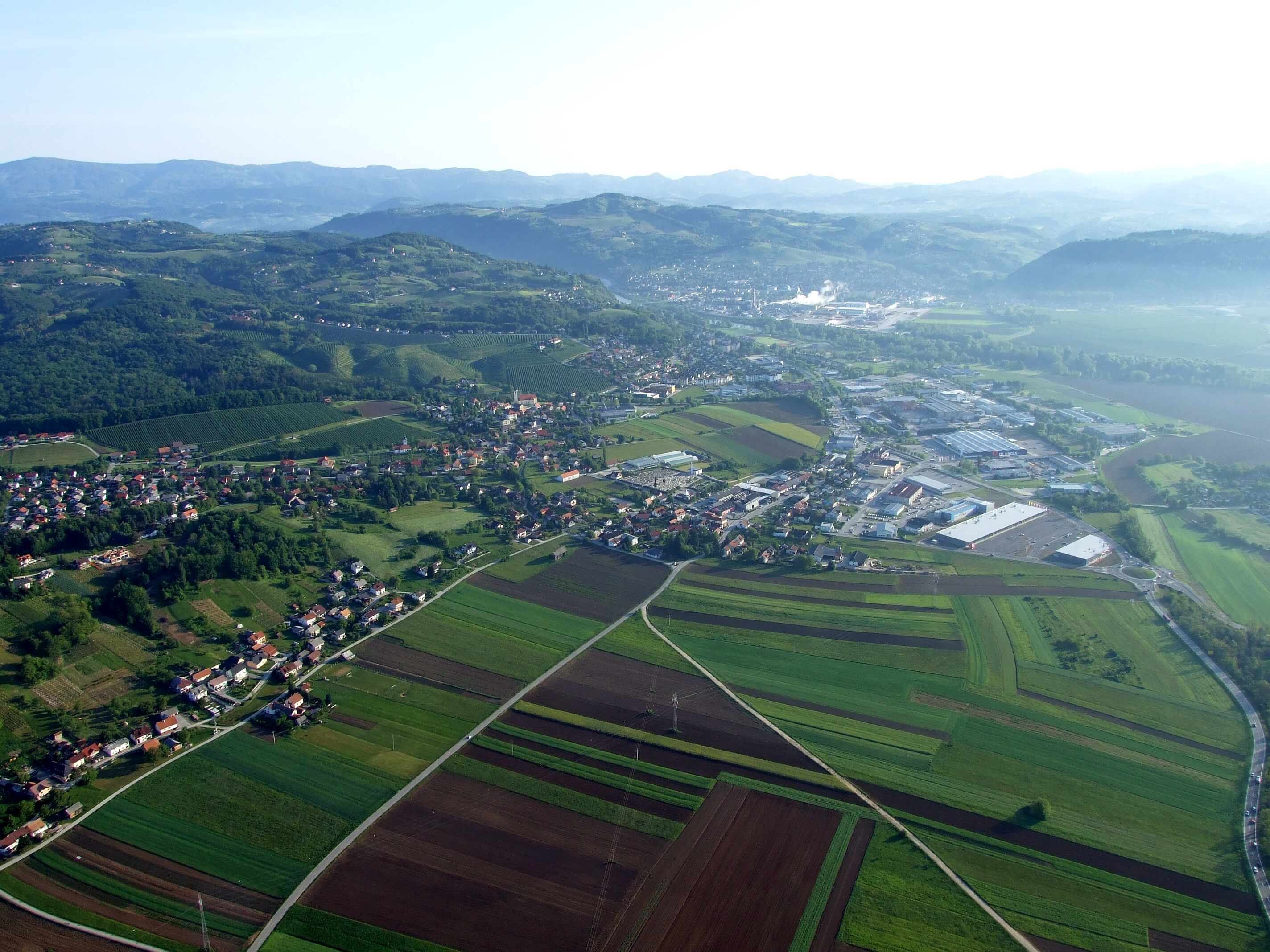

- Location of the Urban Municipality of Krško in Slovenia
- Coordinates: 45°57′N 15°29′E
- Country: Slovenia

Government
  - Mayor: Janez Kerin (Independent)

Area
  - Total: 286.5 km^{2} (110.6 sq mi)
- Elevation: 163 m (535 ft)

Population (2023)
  - Total: 25,982
  - Density: 90.69/km^{2} (234.9/sq mi)
- Time zone: UTC+01 (CET)
  - Summer (DST): UTC+02 (CEST)
- Postal code: 8270
- Area code: (+386) 07
- Vehicle registration: KK
- Website: www.krsko.si

The Urban Municipality of Krško (pronounced [ˈkə́ɾʃkɔ]; Slovene: Mestna občina Krško) is an urban municipality in eastern Slovenia. Its seat is the town of Krško. It borders Croatia. The area is traditionally divided between Lower Styria (territory on the left bank of the Sava) and Lower Carniola (territory on the right bank of the Sava). The entire municipality is now included in the Lower Sava Statistical Region. Krško received the status of an urban municipality in December 2021.

== History ==
Archaeological evidence shows that the area was settled in prehistoric times. Along the Sava River, numerous Bronze and Iron Age sites as well as Roman finds show continuous occupation. After the Medieval period the area was a Habsburg possession. It was affected by Ottoman raids from the 15th to the 17th centuries.

== Main sights ==
Sights in the municipality include the Krško parish church, the Videm-Krško parish church, a church on the right bank of the Sava, a Capuchin monastery, and Krško Castle. Further to the south is Šrajbarski Turn Castle, built in the 16th century. Natural sights in the municipality include Kostanjevica Cave at the foot of the Gorjanci Mountains and the Krakovo Forest, the only virgin forest in Slovenia where pedunculate oak (Quercus robur) grows and provides a habitat for several rare and endangered animal species.

== Economy ==
Industries of the Urban Municipality of Krško include construction, metalworking, paper, textiles, wood processing, agriculture, trade, and transportation, while tourism continues to develop. The fertile flatlands southeast of the town of Krško along the banks of the Sava, known as the Krško-Brežice Plain (Krško - brežiško polje), are used for vineyards as well as apple, pear, peach, apricot, and plum orchards. Local vineyards produce wines such as Cviček, Laški Rizling, and Modra Frankinja, as well as less well-known local wines such as white and red Sremičan and others matured in local wine cellars.

== Settlements ==
In addition to the municipal seat of Krško, the municipality also includes the following settlements:

- Anovec
- Anže
- Apnenik pri Velikem Trnu
- Ardro pod Velikim Trnom
- Ardro pri Raki
- Armeško
- Brege
- Brestanica
- Brezje pri Dovškem
- Brezje pri Raki
- Brezje pri Senušah
- Brezje v Podbočju
- Brezovica v Podbočju
- Brezovska Gora
- Brlog
- Brod v Podbočju
- Bučerca
- Celine
- Cesta
- Cirje
- Črešnjice nad Pijavškim
- Čretež pri Krškem
- Dalce
- Dedni Vrh
- Dobrava ob Krki
- Dobrava pod Rako
- Dobrova
- Dol
- Dolenja Lepa Vas
- Dolenja Vas pri Krškem
- Dolenja Vas pri Raki
- Dolenji Leskovec
- Dolga Raka
- Dovško
- Drenovec pri Leskovcu
- Drnovo
- Dunaj
- Frluga
- Gmajna
- Golek
- Goli Vrh
- Gora
- Gorenja Lepa Vas
- Gorenja Vas pri Leskovcu
- Gorenje Dole
- Gorenji Leskovec
- Gorica
- Gorica pri Raztezu
- Gornje Pijavško
- Gradec
- Gradišče pri Raki
- Gradnje
- Gržeča Vas
- Gunte
- Hrastek
- Ivandol
- Jelenik
- Jelše
- Jelševec
- Kalce
- Kalce–Naklo
- Kališovec
- Kerinov Grm
- Kobile
- Kočno
- Koprivnica
- Koritnica
- Kostanjek
- Kremen
- Kržišče
- Leskovec pri Krškem
- Libelj
- Libna
- Loke
- Lokve
- Lomno
- Mali Kamen
- Mali Koren
- Mali Podlog
- Mali Trn
- Malo Mraševo
- Mikote
- Mladje
- Mrčna Sela
- Mrtvice
- Nemška Gora
- Nemška Vas
- Nova Gora
- Osredek pri Trški Gori
- Pesje
- Pijana Gora
- Planina pri Raki
- Planina v Podbočju
- Pleterje
- Podbočje
- Podlipa
- Podulce
- Površje
- Premagovce
- Presladol
- Pristava ob Krki
- Pristava pod Rako
- Pristava pri Leskovcu
- Prušnja Vas
- Raka
- Ravne pri Zdolah
- Ravni
- Ravno
- Raztez
- Reštanj
- Rožno
- Šedem
- Sela pri Raki
- Selce pri Leskovcu
- Selo
- Senovo
- Senožete
- Senuše
- Slivje
- Smečice
- Smednik
- Spodnja Libna
- Spodnje Dule
- Spodnje Pijavško
- Spodnji Stari Grad
- Srednje Arto
- Srednje Pijavško
- Sremič
- Stari Grad
- Stari Grad v Podbočju
- Stolovnik
- Stranje
- Straža pri Krškem
- Straža pri Raki
- Strmo Rebro
- Šutna
- Trška Gora
- Velika Vas pri Krškem
- Veliki Dol
- Veliki Kamen
- Veliki Koren
- Veliki Podlog
- Veliki Trn
- Veliko Mraševo
- Veniše
- Videm
- Vihre
- Volovnik
- Vrbina
- Vrh pri Površju
- Vrhulje
- Žabjek v Podbočju
- Zabukovje pri Raki
- Žadovinek
- Zaloke
- Zdole
- Ženje

== See also ==
- Speedway Grand Prix of Slovenia
- Brežice
