= Drenovec pri Leskovcu =

Drenovec pri Leskovcu Drenovec (until 1953)
- Location in Slovenia
- Coordinates: 45°56′30.27″N 15°24′52.23″E
- Country: Slovenia
- Traditional region: Lower Carniola
- Statistical region: Lower Sava
- Municipality: Krško

Area
  - Total: 0.45 km^{2} (0.17 sq mi)
- Elevation: 218.4 m (717 ft)

Population (2002)
  - Total: 35
- Postal code: 8273

Drenovec pri Leskovcu (pronounced [ˈdɾeːnɔʋəts pɾi lɛˈskoːu̯tsu]) is a small settlement west of Leskovec pri Krškem in the Municipality of Krško in eastern Slovenia. The area is part of the traditional region of Lower Carniola. It is now included with the rest of the municipality in the Lower Sava Statistical Region.

== Name ==
The name of the settlement was changed from Drenovec to Drenovec pri Leskovcu in 1953.

== Cultural heritage ==
A Roman burial ground has been excavated near the settlement.
