= Brezovica v Podbočju =

Brezovica v Podbočju Brezovica (until 1953)
- Location in Slovenia
- Coordinates: 45°50′48.98″N 15°30′57.25″E
- Country: Slovenia
- Traditional region: Lower Carniola
- Statistical region: Lower Sava
- Municipality: Krško

Area
  - Total: 2.38 km^{2} (0.92 sq mi)
- Elevation: 356.9 m (1,171 ft)

Population (2002)
  - Total: 35

Brezovica v Podbočju (pronounced [ˈbɾéːzɔʋitsa ʍ pɔdˈbóːtʃju]) is a small settlement in the eastern Gorjanci Mountains in the Municipality of Krško in eastern Slovenia, close to the border with Croatia. The area is part of the traditional region of Lower Carniola. It is now included in the Lower Sava Statistical Region. It includes the hamlet of Trebelnik (in older sources also Trebelnič).

== Name ==
The name of the settlement was changed from Brezovica to Brezovica v Podbočju in 1953.
