= Zabukovje pri Raki =

Zabukovje pri Raki Zabukovje (until 1953)
- Location in Slovenia
- Coordinates: 45°56′1.81″N 15°21′30.08″E
- Country: Slovenia
- Traditional region: Lower Carniola
- Statistical region: Lower Sava
- Municipality: Krško

Area
  - Total: 0.69 km^{2} (0.27 sq mi)
- Elevation: 234.3 m (769 ft)

Population (2002)
  - Total: 53
- Postal code: 8274

Zabukovje pri Raki (pronounced [zaˈbuːkɔu̯jɛ pɾi ˈɾaːki]) is a settlement in the hills west of Raka in the Municipality of Krško in eastern Slovenia. The area is part of the traditional region of Lower Carniola. It is now included with the rest of the municipality in the Lower Sava Statistical Region.

== Name ==
The name of the settlement was changed from Zabukovje to Zabukovje pri Raki in 1953.
