= Vihre =

- Location in Slovenia
- Coordinates: 45°54′48.49″N 15°31′39.39″E
- Country: Slovenia
- Traditional region: Lower Carniola
- Statistical region: Lower Sava
- Municipality: Krško

Area
  - Total: 3.12 km^{2} (1.20 sq mi)
- Elevation: 154.8 m (508 ft)

Population (2002)
  - Total: 153
- Postal code: 8273

Vihre (pronounced [ˈʋiːxɾɛ]) is a village in the Municipality of Krško in eastern Slovenia. It lies between the right bank of the Sava River and the motorway from Ljubljana to Zagreb. The area is part of the traditional region of Lower Carniola. It is now included with the rest of the municipality in the Lower Sava Statistical Region.

The local church, built southeast of the village, is dedicated to Saint Ulrich (Slovene: sveti Urh) and belongs to the Parish of Leskovec pri Krškem. It was built in the 15th century and greatly rebuilt in the late 19th century.

Parts of buildings and the eastern necropolis of the Roman town of Neviodunum have been excavated close to the settlement.
