= Strmo Rebro =

- Location in Slovenia
- Coordinates: 45°58′48.28″N 15°26′13.65″E
- Country: Slovenia
- Traditional region: Lower Carniola
- Statistical region: Lower Sava
- Municipality: Krško

Area
  - Total: 0.54 km^{2} (0.21 sq mi)
- Elevation: 400.2 m (1,313 ft)

Population (2002)
  - Total: 11
- Postal code: 8270

Strmo Rebro (pronounced [ˈstəɾmɔ ˈɾɛːbɾɔ]) is a small settlement in the hills above the right bank of the Sava River, northwest of Gora in the Municipality of Krško in eastern Slovenia. The area is part of the traditional region of Lower Carniola. It is now included with the rest of the municipality in the Lower Sava Statistical Region.
