= Spodnji Stari Grad =

- Location in Slovenia
- Coordinates: 45°56′41.08″N 15°32′9.71″E
- Country: Slovenia
- Traditional region: Styria
- Statistical region: Lower Sava
- Municipality: Krško

Area
  - Total: 2.23 km^{2} (0.86 sq mi)
- Elevation: 153.4 m (503 ft)

Population (2002)
  - Total: 237

Spodnji Stari Grad (pronounced [ˈspoːdnji ˈstaːɾi ˈɡɾaːt]) is a settlement on the left bank of the Sava River in the Municipality of Krško in eastern Slovenia. The area is part of the traditional region of Styria. It is now included with the rest of the municipality in the Lower Sava Statistical Region.
