= Gorenja Lepa Vas =

- Location in Slovenia
- Coordinates: 45°58′9.21″N 15°25′41.75″E
- Country: Slovenia
- Traditional region: Lower Carniola
- Statistical region: Lower Sava
- Municipality: Krško

Area
  - Total: 0.57 km^{2} (0.22 sq mi)
- Elevation: 423 m (1,388 ft)

Population (2002)
  - Total: 37

Gorenja Lepa Vas (pronounced [ɡɔˈɾeːnja ˈleːpa ˈʋaːs]; Slovene: Gorenja Lepa vas, German: Oberschöndorf) is a small settlement in the hills above the right bank of the Sava River in the Municipality of Krško in eastern Slovenia. The area is part of the traditional region of Lower Carniola. It is now included with the rest of the municipality in the Lower Sava Statistical Region.

The local church, built north of the settlement core, is dedicated to Saints Primus and Felician and belongs to the Parish of Sv. Duh–Veliki Trn. It is essentially a Romanesque building with a rectangular nave that was extended in 1836.
