= Mladje =

- Location in Slovenia
- Coordinates: 45°50′49.6″N 15°28′35.42″E
- Country: Slovenia
- Traditional region: Lower Carniola
- Statistical region: Lower Sava
- Municipality: Krško

Area
  - Total: 1.32 km^{2} (0.51 sq mi)
- Elevation: 383.2 m (1,257 ft)

Population (2002)
  - Total: 25
- Postal code: 8312

Mladje (pronounced [ˈmlaːdjɛ]) is a small village south of Podbočje in the Gorjanci Mountains in the Municipality of Krško in eastern Slovenia. The area is part of the traditional region of Lower Carniola. It is now included with the rest of the municipality in the Lower Sava Statistical Region.
