= Selce pri Leskovcu =

Selce pri Leskovcu Selce (until 1953)
- Location in Slovenia
- Coordinates: 45°56′43.69″N 15°27′6.53″E
- Country: Slovenia
- Traditional region: Lower Carniola
- Statistical region: Lower Sava
- Municipality: Krško

Area
  - Total: 0.67 km^{2} (0.26 sq mi)
- Elevation: 203.5 m (668 ft)

Population (2002)
  - Total: 43
- Postal code: 8273

Selce pri Leskovcu (pronounced [ˈseːu̯tsɛ pɾi lɛˈskoːu̯tsu]) is a small settlement west of Leskovec pri Krškem in the Municipality of Krško in eastern Slovenia. The area is part of the traditional region of Lower Carniola. It is now included in the Lower Sava Statistical Region.

== Name ==
The name of the settlement was changed from Selce to Selce pri Leskovcu in 1953.

== Cultural heritage ==
There is a small chapel-shrine in the settlement, dedicated to the Virgin Mary. It was built in the early 20th century.
