= Brezje pri Raki =

Brezje pri Raki Brezje (until 1953)
- Location in Slovenia
- Coordinates: 45°55′25.62″N 15°21′0.14″E
- Country: Slovenia
- Traditional region: Lower Carniola
- Statistical region: Lower Sava
- Municipality: Krško

Area
  - Total: 1.93 km^{2} (0.75 sq mi)
- Elevation: 200.1 m (656 ft)

Population (2002)
  - Total: 51

Brezje pri Raki (pronounced [ˈbɾeːzjɛ pɾi ˈɾaːki]) is a settlement west of Raka in the Municipality of Krško in eastern Slovenia. The area is part of the traditional region of Lower Carniola. It is now included with the rest of the municipality in the Lower Sava Statistical Region.

== Name ==
Brezje pri Raki was attested in written sources as Fresau in 1420, Pirikch in 1433, and Fresach in 1436. The name of the settlement was changed from Brezje to Brezje pri Raki in 1953.

== Cultural heritage ==
A prehistoric burial ground of five graves has been found in the settlement. In 1958 locals dug up three of the graves. The site was greatly damaged and very few of the archaeological finds were recovered by the museum in Brežice.
