= Loke, Krško =

Loke
- Location in Slovenia
- Coordinates: 45°56′49.36″N 15°27′46.04″E
- Country: Slovenia
- Traditional region: Lower Carniola
- Statistical region: Lower Sava
- Municipality: Krško

Area
  - Total: 1.24 km^{2} (0.48 sq mi)
- Elevation: 210.5 m (691 ft)

Population (2002)
  - Total: 63
- Postal code: 8273

Loke (pronounced [ˈloːkɛ]) is a small settlement in the hills immediately northwest of Leskovec pri Krškem in the Municipality of Krško in eastern Slovenia. The area is part of the traditional region of Lower Carniola. It is now included with the rest of the municipality in the Lower Sava Statistical Region. It includes an isolated vacation estate on Saint Florian Hill (Slovene: Florjanov hrib) east of the settlement, known as Florijanovo (German: Thalhof).

There is a small chapel-shrine in the settlement, dedicated to the Virgin Mary. It was built in the early 20th century.
