= Prušnja Vas =

Prušnja Vas Prušnja vas
- Location in Slovenia
- Coordinates: 45°50′5.5″N 15°28′45.7″E
- Country: Slovenia
- Traditional region: Lower Carniola
- Statistical region: Lower Sava
- Municipality: Krško

Area
  - Total: 1.26 km^{2} (0.49 sq mi)
- Elevation: 478.1 m (1,569 ft)

Population (2002)
  - Total: 44
- Postal code: 8312

Prušnja Vas (pronounced [ˈpɾuːʃnja ˈʋaːs]; Slovene: Prušnja vas, in older sources also Prušna vas, German: Pruschendorf) is a small settlement in the Gorjanci Mountains in the Municipality of Krško in eastern Slovenia, next to the border with Croatia. The area is part of the traditional region of Lower Carniola. It is now included with the rest of the municipality in the Lower Sava Statistical Region.
