= Presladol =

- Location in Slovenia
- Coordinates: 46°0′57.02″N 15°25′34.68″E
- Country: Slovenia
- Traditional region: Styria
- Statistical region: Lower Sava
- Municipality: Krško

Area
  - Total: 4.54 km^{2} (1.75 sq mi)
- Elevation: 237.3 m (779 ft)

Population (2002)
  - Total: 181
- Postal code: 8280

Presladol (pronounced [ˈpɾeːsladɔl]) is a settlement in the hills northwest of Brestanica in the Municipality of Krško in eastern Slovenia. The area is part of the traditional region of Styria. It is now included in the Lower Sava Statistical Region.

There is a small chapel-shrine in the settlement, dedicated to the Virgin Mary. It belongs to the Parish of Brestanica and was built in the late 19th century.
