= Zaloke =

- Location in Slovenia
- Coordinates: 45°54′35.72″N 15°24′19.82″E
- Country: Slovenia
- Traditional region: Lower Carniola
- Statistical region: Lower Sava
- Municipality: Krško

Area
  - Total: 7.77 km^{2} (3.00 sq mi)
- Elevation: 165.4 m (543 ft)

Population (2002)
  - Total: 62
- Postal code: 8274

Zaloke (pronounced [ˈzaːlɔkɛ]) is a settlement in the Municipality of Krško in eastern Slovenia. The motorway from Ljubljana to Zagreb crosses the territory of Zaloke. The area is part of the traditional region of Lower Carniola. It is now included with the rest of the municipality in the Lower Sava Statistical Region.
