= Spodnje Dule =

Spodnje Dule Spodnje Dole (until 1990)
- Location in Slovenia
- Coordinates: 45°57′41.19″N 15°26′22.87″E
- Country: Slovenia
- Traditional region: Lower Carniola
- Statistical region: Lower Sava
- Municipality: Krško

Area
  - Total: 1.42 km^{2} (0.55 sq mi)
- Elevation: 395.2 m (1,297 ft)

Population (2002)
  - Total: 72

Spodnje Dule (pronounced [ˈspoːdnjɛ ˈduːlɛ]) is a settlement in the hills northwest of Leskovec pri Krškem in the Municipality of Krško in eastern Slovenia. The area is part of the traditional region of Lower Carniola and is now included along with the rest of the municipality in the Lower Sava Statistical Region.

== Name ==
The name of the settlement was changed from Spodnje Dole to Spodnje Dule in 1990.
