= Mali Koren =

- Location in Slovenia
- Coordinates: 45°53′44.86″N 15°22′47.13″E
- Country: Slovenia
- Traditional region: Lower Carniola
- Statistical region: Lower Sava
- Municipality: Krško

Area
  - Total: 1.2 km^{2} (0.46 sq mi)
- Elevation: 154.8 m (508 ft)

Population (2002)
  - Total: 25

Mali Koren (pronounced [ˈmaːli ˈkoːɾɛn]; German: Kleinwurzen) is a small settlement in the Municipality of Krško in eastern Slovenia. The area is part of the traditional region of Lower Carniola. It is now included with the rest of the municipality in the Lower Sava Statistical Region.

There is a small chapel-shrine in the fields northwest of the village. It was built in the early 20th century.
