= Čretež pri Krškem =

Čretež pri Krškem Čretež (until 1953)
- Location in Slovenia
- Coordinates: 45°57′58.05″N 15°27′41.04″E
- Country: Slovenia
- Traditional region: Lower Carniola
- Statistical region: Lower Sava
- Municipality: Krško

Area
  - Total: 0.68 km^{2} (0.26 sq mi)
- Elevation: 367.3 m (1,205 ft)

Population (2002)
  - Total: 48
- Postal code: 8270

Čretež pri Krškem (pronounced [ˈtʃɾeːtɛʃ pɾi ˈkəɾʃkɛm]; German: Tschretesch) is a small settlement in the hills above the right bank of the Sava River west of the town of Krško in eastern Slovenia. The area is part of the traditional region of Lower Carniola. It is now included with the rest of the municipality in the Lower Sava Statistical Region.

== Name ==
The name of the settlement was changed from Čretež to Čretež pri Krškem in 1953. In the past the German name was Tschretesch.
