= Bučerca =

- Location in Slovenia
- Coordinates: 45°58′31.94″N 15°30′42.51″E
- Country: Slovenia
- Traditional region: Styria
- Statistical region: Lower Sava
- Municipality: Krško

Area
  - Total: 1.8 km^{2} (0.69 sq mi)
- Elevation: 335.5 m (1,101 ft)

Population (2002)
  - Total: 83
- Postal code: 8270

Bučerca (pronounced [ˈbuːtʃɛɾtsa], German: Butscherza) is a settlement in the hills immediately north of the town of Krško in eastern Slovenia. The area is part of the traditional region of Styria. It is now included with the rest of the municipality in the Lower Sava Statistical Region.
