= Srednje Pijavško =

- Location in Slovenia
- Coordinates: 45°59′15.56″N 15°25′54.35″E
- Country: Slovenia
- Traditional region: Lower Carniola
- Statistical region: Lower Sava
- Municipality: Krško

Area
  - Total: 0.48 km^{2} (0.19 sq mi)
- Elevation: 171.8 m (564 ft)

Population (2002)
  - Total: 15
- Postal code: 8270

Srednje Pijavško (pronounced [ˈsɾeːdnjɛ piˈjaːu̯ʃkɔ]; German: Mitterpiauschko) is a small settlement on the right bank of the Sava River in the Municipality of Krško in eastern Slovenia. The area is part of the traditional region of Lower Carniola and is now included with the rest of the municipality in the Lower Sava Statistical Region.

There is a small chapel-shrine in the settlement. It was built in the late 19th century.
