= Frluga =

- Location in Slovenia
- Coordinates: 45°50′1.02″N 15°28′32.22″E
- Country: Slovenia
- Traditional region: Lower Carniola
- Statistical region: Lower Sava
- Municipality: Krško

Area
  - Total: 0.41 km^{2} (0.16 sq mi)
- Elevation: 481.7 m (1,580 ft)

Population (2002)
  - Total: 5
- Postal code: 8312

Frluga (pronounced [fəɾˈluːɡa]; in older sources also Ferluga) is a small settlement in the Gorjanci Mountains in the Municipality of Krško in eastern Slovenia, close to the border with Croatia. The area is part of the traditional region of Lower Carniola. It is now included in the Lower Sava Statistical Region.

== Name ==
Frluga was attested in historical sources in 1407, 1449, and 1507 as Verlug.

== Church ==
The local church is dedicated to Saint Catherine and belongs to the Parish of Sveti Križ–Podbočje. Its shape indicates Romanesque origins, but the church was rebuilt in 1647.
