= Kerinov Grm =

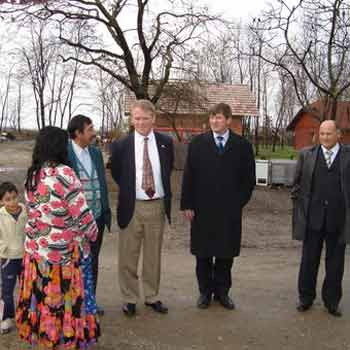
- United States ambassador Thomas B. Robertson visiting the Romani settlement of Kerinov Grm (2005)

- Location in Slovenia
- Coordinates: 45°54′19″N 15°29′26″E
- Country: Slovenia
- Traditional region: Lower Carniola
- Statistical region: Lower Sava
- Municipality: Krško

Area
  - Total: 0.04 km^{2} (0.015 sq mi)

Population (2012)
  - Total: 134

Kerinov Grm (pronounced [kɛˈɾiːnɔu̯ ˈɡəɾm]) is a settlement in the Municipality of Krško in southeastern Slovenia. It was established as an autonomous settlement in 2010. On 1 January 2012, it had an area of 3.99 hectares (9.9 acres) and 134 inhabitants. Kerinov Grm is a Romani settlement. A museum of Romani culture named the Old House (Slovene: Stara hiša) opened in April 2013 and there is a preschool in the settlement for Romani children.
