= Selo, Krško =

Selo
- Location in Slovenia
- Coordinates: 45°51′40.17″N 15°27′5.91″E
- Country: Slovenia
- Traditional region: Lower Carniola
- Statistical region: Lower Sava
- Municipality: Krško

Area
  - Total: 0.36 km^{2} (0.14 sq mi)
- Elevation: 150.5 m (494 ft)

Population (2002)
  - Total: 14
- Postal code: 8312

Selo (pronounced [ˈsɛːlɔ]) is a small settlement on the right bank of the Krka River west of Podbočje in the Municipality of Krško in eastern Slovenia. The area is part of the traditional region of Lower Carniola. It is now included in the Lower Sava Statistical Region.
