= Lokve, Krško =

Settlement in Slovenia

Lokve
- Location in Slovenia
- Coordinates: 46°1′7.23″N 15°30′11.4″E
- Country: Slovenia
- Traditional region: Styria
- Statistical region: Lower Sava
- Municipality: Krško

Area
  - Total: 1.88 km^{2} (0.73 sq mi)
- Elevation: 277.4 m (910 ft)

Population (2002)
  - Total: 66
- Postal code: 8280

Lokve (pronounced [ˈloːkʋɛ]) is a small settlement east of Senovo in the Municipality of Krško in eastern Slovenia. The area is part of the traditional region of Styria. It is now included with the rest of the municipality in the Lower Sava Statistical Region.

There is a small chapel-shrine in the settlement dedicated to the Sacred Heart of Jesus. It was built in the late 19th century.
