= Gorica pri Raztezu =

Gorica pri Raztezu Gorica (until 1953)
- Location in Slovenia
- Coordinates: 46°0′17.91″N 15°31′41.6″E
- Country: Slovenia
- Traditional region: Styria
- Statistical region: Lower Sava
- Municipality: Krško

Area
  - Total: 1.65 km^{2} (0.64 sq mi)
- Elevation: 294.9 m (968 ft)

Population (2002)
  - Total: 63
- Postal code: 8280

Gorica pri Raztezu (pronounced [ɡɔˈɾiːtsa pɾi ˈɾaːstɛzu]) is a settlement west of Brestanica in the Municipality of Krško in eastern Slovenia. The area is part of the traditional region of Styria. It is now included in the Lower Sava Statistical Region.

The local church is dedicated to the Holy Spirit and belongs to the Parish of Brestanica. It is essentially a medieval church with a rectangular nave that was restyled in the Baroque style in the late 18th century.

== Name ==
The name of the settlement was changed from Gorica to Gorica pri Raztezu in 1953.
