= Pristava pod Rako =

Pristava pod Rako Pristava (until 1953)
- Location in Slovenia
- Coordinates: 45°55′3.97″N 15°22′25.86″E
- Country: Slovenia
- Traditional region: Lower Carniola
- Statistical region: Lower Sava
- Municipality: Krško

Area
  - Total: 0.35 km^{2} (0.14 sq mi)
- Elevation: 193.4 m (635 ft)

Population (2002)
  - Total: 20
- Postal code: 8274

Pristava pod Rako (pronounced [pɾiˈstaːʋa pɔd ˈɾaːkɔ]) is a small settlement south of Raka in the Municipality of Krško in eastern Slovenia. The area is part of the traditional region of Lower Carniola. It is now included with the rest of the municipality in the Lower Sava Statistical Region.

== Name ==
The name of the settlement was changed from Pristava to Pristava pod Rako in 1953.
