= Armeško =

- Location in Slovenia
- Coordinates: 46°0′35.7″N 15°29′23.24″E
- Country: Slovenia
- Traditional region: Lower Carniola
- Statistical region: Lower Sava
- Municipality: Krško

Area
  - Total: 2.05 km^{2} (0.79 sq mi)
- Elevation: 221.1 m (725 ft)

Population (2002)
  - Total: 162

Armeško (pronounced [aɾˈmeːʃkɔ]) is a settlement north of Brestanica in the Municipality of Krško in eastern Slovenia. The area is part of the traditional region of Lower Carniola. It is now included with the rest of the municipality in the Lower Sava Statistical Region.

The local church, built on a hill northeast of the main core of the settlement, is dedicated to the Holy Cross. It is a medieval structure that was remodelled in the Baroque style in the 18th century. Its interior was refurbished in the 19th century.
