= Podulce =

- Location in Slovenia
- Coordinates: 45°55′45.13″N 15°22′17.78″E
- Country: Slovenia
- Traditional region: Lower Carniola
- Statistical region: Lower Sava
- Municipality: Krško

Area
  - Total: 1.41 km^{2} (0.54 sq mi)
- Elevation: 240.7 m (790 ft)

Population (2002)
  - Total: 85
- Postal code: 8274

Podulce (pronounced [pɔˈduːltsɛ]) is a settlement northeast of Raka in the Municipality of Krško in eastern Slovenia. The area is part of the traditional region of Lower Carniola. It is now included with the rest of the municipality in the Lower Sava Statistical Region.

The local church is dedicated to Saint Margaret (Slovene: sveta Marjeta) and belongs to the Parish of Raka. It is a medieval building with a belfry that was added in 1839.
