= Mikote =

- Location in Slovenia
- Coordinates: 45°54′52.77″N 15°23′21.47″E
- Country: Slovenia
- Traditional region: Lower Carniola
- Statistical region: Lower Sava
- Municipality: Krško

Area
  - Total: 0.98 km^{2} (0.38 sq mi)
- Elevation: 194.1 m (637 ft)

Population (2002)
  - Total: 58
- Postal code: 8274

Mikote (pronounced [ˈmiːkɔtɛ]) is a small settlement south of Raka in the Municipality of Krško in eastern Slovenia. It lies just north of the A2 motorway from Ljubljana to Zagreb. The area is part of the traditional region of Lower Carniola. It is now included with the rest of the municipality in the Lower Sava Statistical Region.
