= Smečice =

- Location in Slovenia
- Coordinates: 45°57′46.82″N 15°22′48.79″E
- Country: Slovenia
- Traditional region: Lower Carniola
- Statistical region: Lower Sava
- Municipality: Krško

Area
  - Total: 1.15 km^{2} (0.44 sq mi)
- Elevation: 338.5 m (1,111 ft)

Population (2002)
  - Total: 32
- Postal code: 8270

Smečice (pronounced [ˈsmeːtʃitsɛ]) is a small settlement in the hills west of Krško in eastern Slovenia. The area is part of the traditional region of Lower Carniola. It is now included with the rest of the municipality in the Lower Sava Statistical Region.

There is a small chapel-shrine in the settlement. It is dedicated to the Holy Family and was built in the late 19th century.
