= Sremič =

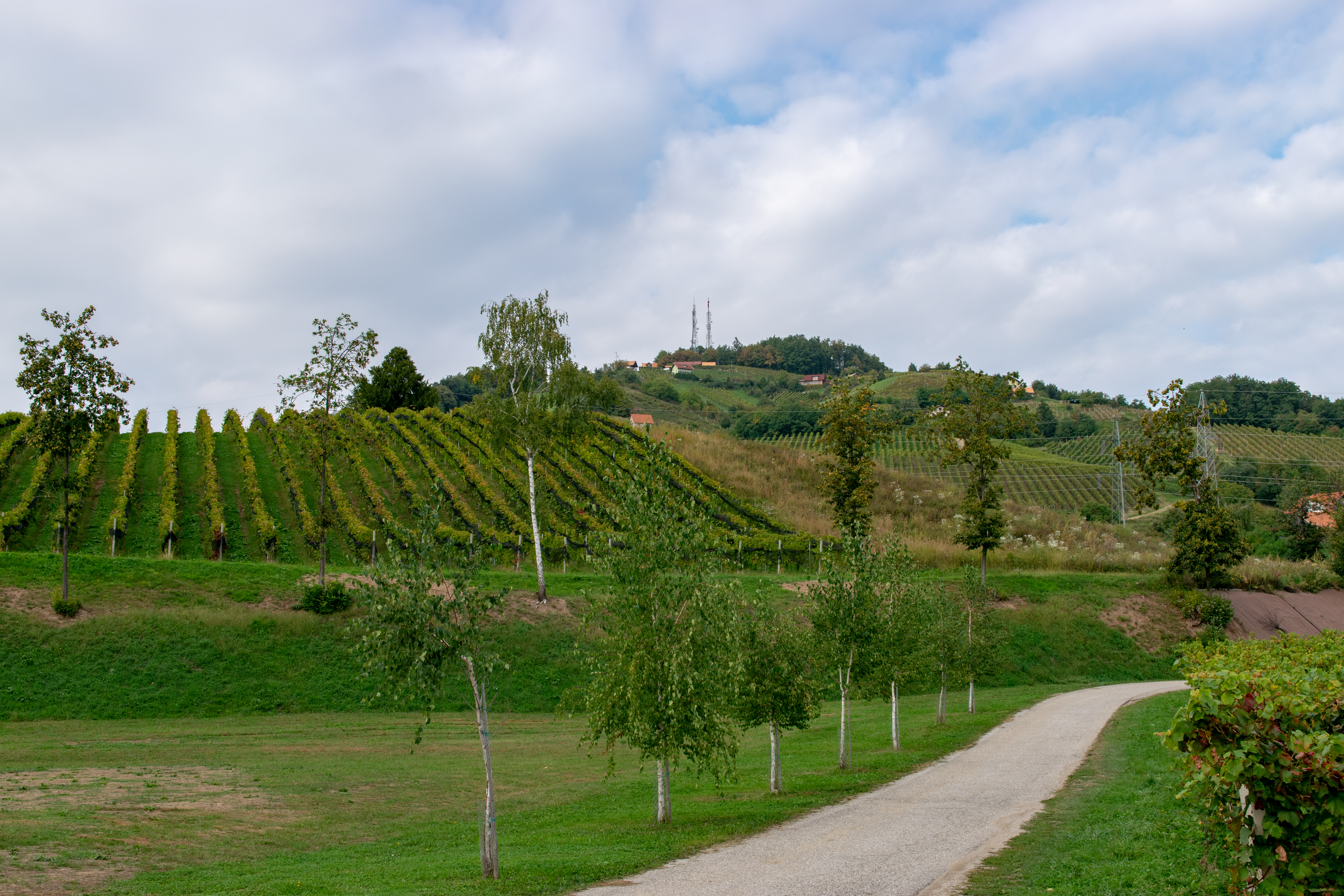

- Location in Slovenia
- Coordinates: 45°59′4.05″N 15°29′18.24″E
- Country: Slovenia
- Traditional region: Styria
- Statistical region: Lower Sava
- Municipality: Krško

Area
  - Total: 4.31 km^{2} (1.66 sq mi)
- Elevation: 400.9 m (1,315 ft)

Population (2002)
  - Total: 151
- Postal code: 8270

Sremič (pronounced [ˈsɾeːmitʃ], German: Sremitsch) is a dispersed settlement in the hills north of the town of Krško in eastern Slovenia. The area is part of the traditional region of Styria and is now included with the rest of the municipality in the Lower Sava Statistical Region.

There is a small chapel in the settlement. It is dedicated to John the Baptist and was built in 1862 by the local Trappists on their land.
