= Gradnje, Krško =

Gradnje Gradinje (until 1990)
- Location in Slovenia
- Coordinates: 45°50′24.18″N 15°27′55.35″E
- Country: Slovenia
- Traditional region: Lower Carniola
- Statistical region: Lower Sava
- Municipality: Krško

Area
  - Total: 1.91 km^{2} (0.74 sq mi)
- Elevation: 415.1 m (1,362 ft)

Population (2002)
  - Total: 22
- Postal code: 8312

Gradnje (pronounced [ˈɡɾaːdnjɛ]) is a settlement in the Gorjanci Mountains in the Municipality of Krško in eastern Slovenia. The area is part of the traditional region of Lower Carniola. It is now included with the rest of the municipality in the Lower Sava Statistical Region.

== Name ==
The name of the settlement was changed from Gradinje to Gradnje in 1990.

== Cultural heritage ==
There is a small chapel-shine in the settlement, dedicated to the Virgin Mary. It was built in the early 20th century.
