= Sela pri Raki =

Sela pri Raki Sela (until 1953)
- Location in Slovenia
- Coordinates: 45°55′15.32″N 15°23′57.83″E
- Country: Slovenia
- Traditional region: Lower Carniola
- Statistical region: Lower Sava
- Municipality: Krško

Area
  - Total: 1.21 km^{2} (0.47 sq mi)
- Elevation: 206 m (676 ft)

Population (2002)
  - Total: 83
- Postal code: 8274

Sela pri Raki (pronounced [ˈseːla pɾi ˈɾaːki]) is a settlement southeast of Raka in the Municipality of Krško in eastern Slovenia. The area is part of the traditional region of Lower Carniola. It is now included in the Lower Sava Statistical Region.

== Name ==
The name of the settlement was changed from Sela to Sela pri Raki in 1953.
