= Veliki Trn =

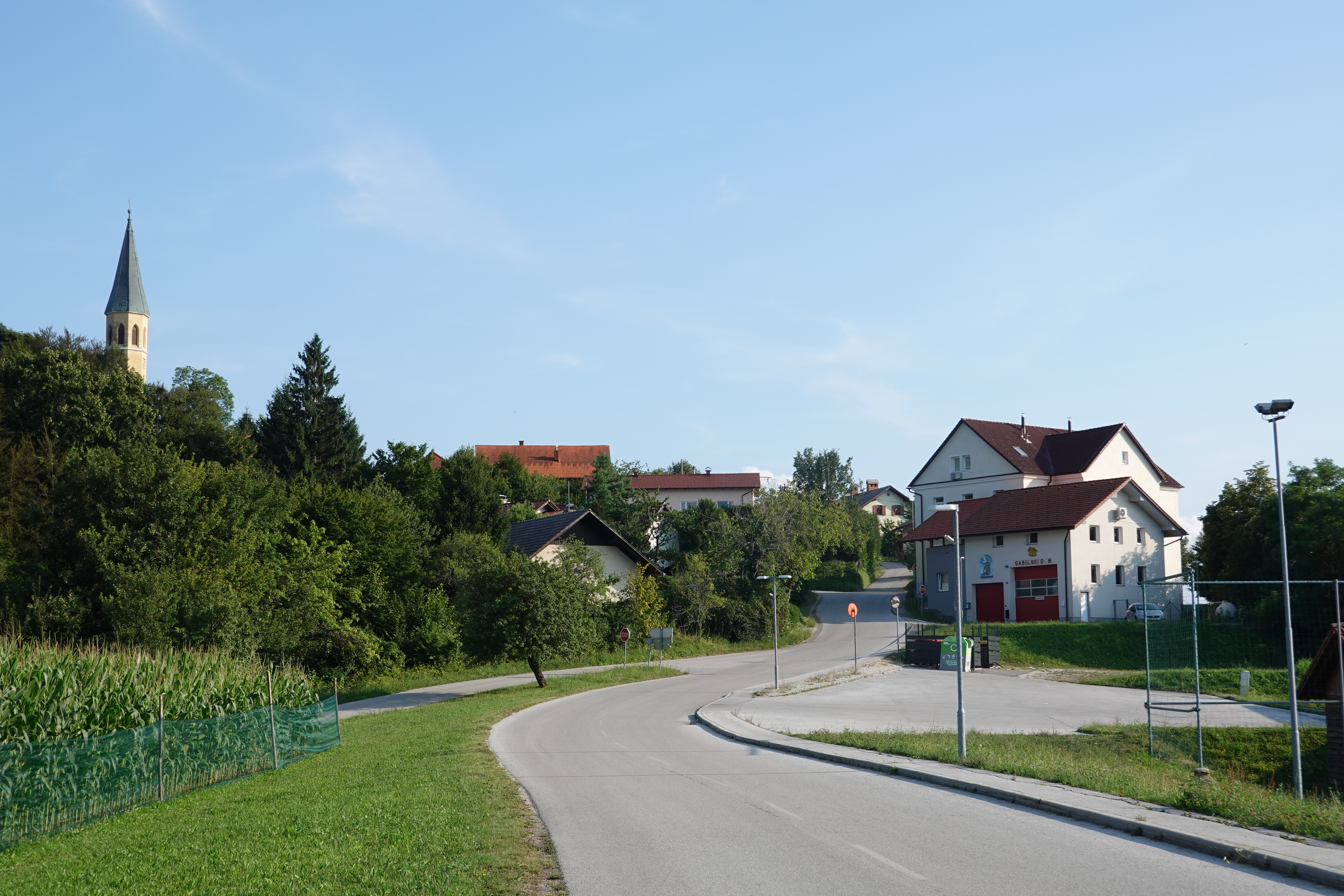

- Location in Slovenia
- Coordinates: 45°58′1.22″N 15°23′41.85″E
- Country: Slovenia
- Traditional region: Lower Carniola
- Statistical region: Lower Sava
- Municipality: Krško

Area
  - Total: 0.72 km^{2} (0.28 sq mi)
- Elevation: 411.6 m (1,350 ft)

Population (2002)
  - Total: 50
- Postal code: 8270

Veliki Trn (pronounced [ˈʋeːliki ˈtəɾn]; German: Großdorn) is a small settlement in the Municipality of Krško in eastern Slovenia. The area is part of the traditional region of Lower Carniola. It is now included with the rest of the municipality in the Lower Sava Statistical Region.
