= Nova Gora, Krško =

Nova Gora
- Location in Slovenia
- Coordinates: 45°57′6.35″N 15°24′17.21″E
- Country: Slovenia
- Traditional region: Lower Carniola
- Statistical region: Lower Sava
- Municipality: Krško

Area
  - Total: 1.11 km^{2} (0.43 sq mi)
- Elevation: 421.1 m (1,382 ft)

Population (2002)
  - Total: 47
- Postal code: 8270

Nova Gora (pronounced [ˈnɔːʋa ˈɡɔːɾa]; German: Neuberg) is a settlement in the hills west of Krško in eastern Slovenia. The area is part of the traditional region of Lower Carniola. It is now included with the rest of the municipality in the Lower Sava Statistical Region.
