= Dalce =

- Location in Slovenia
- Coordinates: 45°58′29.34″N 15°23′58.31″E
- Country: Slovenia
- Traditional region: Lower Carniola
- Statistical region: Lower Sava
- Municipality: Krško

Area
  - Total: 0.33 km^{2} (0.13 sq mi)
- Elevation: 360.4 m (1,182 ft)

Population (2002)
  - Total: 10
- Postal code: 8270

Dalce (pronounced [ˈdaːltsɛ]) is a small settlement in the hills above the right bank of the Sava River in the Municipality of Krško in eastern Slovenia. The area is part of the traditional region of Lower Carniola. It is now included with the rest of the municipality in the Lower Sava Statistical Region.

== Church ==
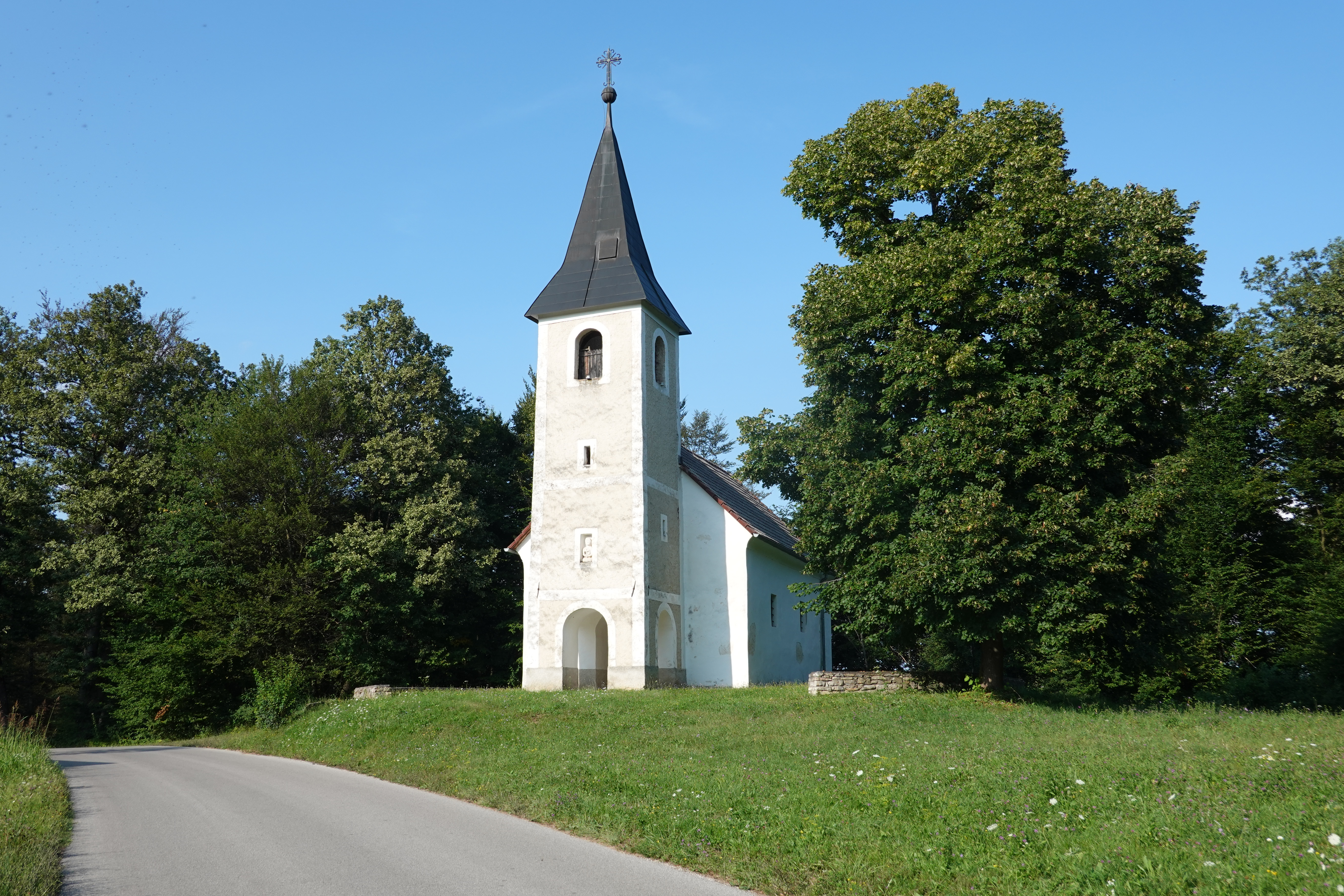
Saint Andrew's Church

The local church is dedicated to Saint Andrew (Slovene: sveti Andrej) and belongs to the Parish of Sveti Duh–Veliki Trn. It is a Gothic church, built in the early 15th century. Its main altar dates to the mid-17th century.
