= Brezje v Podbočju =

Brezje v Podbočju Brezje (until 1953)
- Location in Slovenia
- Coordinates: 45°50′14.06″N 15°29′29.8″E
- Country: Slovenia
- Traditional region: Lower Carniola
- Statistical region: Lower Sava
- Municipality: Krško

Area
  - Total: 1.91 km^{2} (0.74 sq mi)
- Elevation: 532.2 m (1,746 ft)

Population (2002)
  - Total: 42

Brezje v Podbočju (pronounced [ˈbɾéːzjɛ ʍ pɔdˈbóːtʃju]) is a small settlement in the Gorjanci Mountains in the Municipality of Krško in eastern Slovenia, next to the border with Croatia. The area is part of the traditional region of Lower Carniola. It is now included with the rest of the municipality in the Lower Sava Statistical Region.

== Name ==
Brezje v Podbočju was attested in written sources as Briecz in 1360 and Piͤrch in 1376, among other spellings. The name of the settlement was changed from Brezje to Brezje v Podbočju in 1953.

== Cultural heritage ==
A small chapel-shrine in the eastern part of the settlement is dedicated to the Virgin Mary and was built in the early 20th century.
