= Kostanjek =

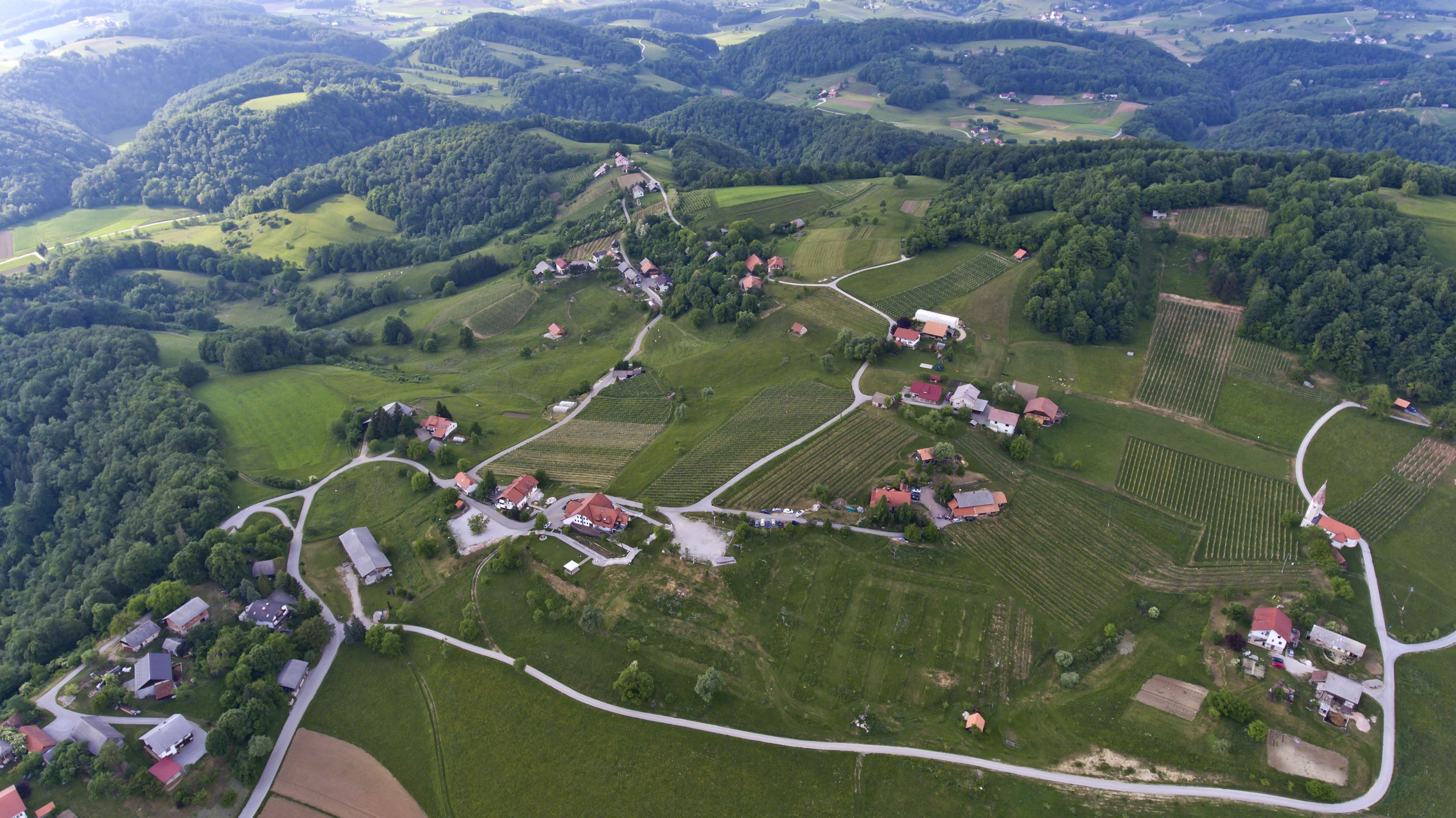
- A bird's eye view of Kostanjek

- Location in Slovenia
- Coordinates: 46°0′32.26″N 15°32′29.15″E
- Country: Slovenia
- Traditional region: Styria
- Statistical region: Lower Sava
- Municipality: Krško

Area
  - Total: 2.97 km^{2} (1.15 sq mi)
- Elevation: 337.7 m (1,108 ft)

Population (2002)
  - Total: 135
- Postal code: 8272

Kostanjek (pronounced [kɔˈstaːnjək], German: Kosteinek) is a settlement north of Zdole in the Municipality of Krško in eastern Slovenia. The area is part of the traditional region of Styria. It is now included with the rest of the municipality in the Lower Sava Statistical Region.

The local church is dedicated to Saint Vitus and belongs to the Parish of Zdole. It is a Baroque church dating to the early 18th century. Its nave was extended in 1853.
