= Gunte =

- Location in Slovenia
- Coordinates: 45°58′48.5″N 15°28′2.37″E
- Country: Slovenia
- Traditional region: Lower Carniola
- Statistical region: Lower Sava
- Municipality: Krško

Area
  - Total: 0.73 km^{2} (0.28 sq mi)
- Elevation: 318.4 m (1,045 ft)

Population (2002)
  - Total: 31
- Postal code: 8270

Gunte (pronounced [ˈɡuːntɛ]) is a small settlement in the hills above the right bank of the Sava River in the Municipality of Krško in eastern Slovenia. The area is part of the traditional region of Lower Carniola. It is now included with the rest of the municipality in the Lower Sava Statistical Region.

Archaeological finds from the area indicate that the Roman road from Neviodunum to Celeia and the bridge over the Sava River were on the banks below the settlement.
