= Dobrova, Krško =

Dobrova
- Location in Slovenia
- Coordinates: 46°3′8.4″N 15°27′32.94″E
- Country: Slovenia
- Traditional region: Styria
- Statistical region: Lower Sava
- Municipality: Krško

Area
  - Total: 9.45 km^{2} (3.65 sq mi)
- Elevation: 581.4 m (1,907 ft)

Population (2002)
  - Total: 200

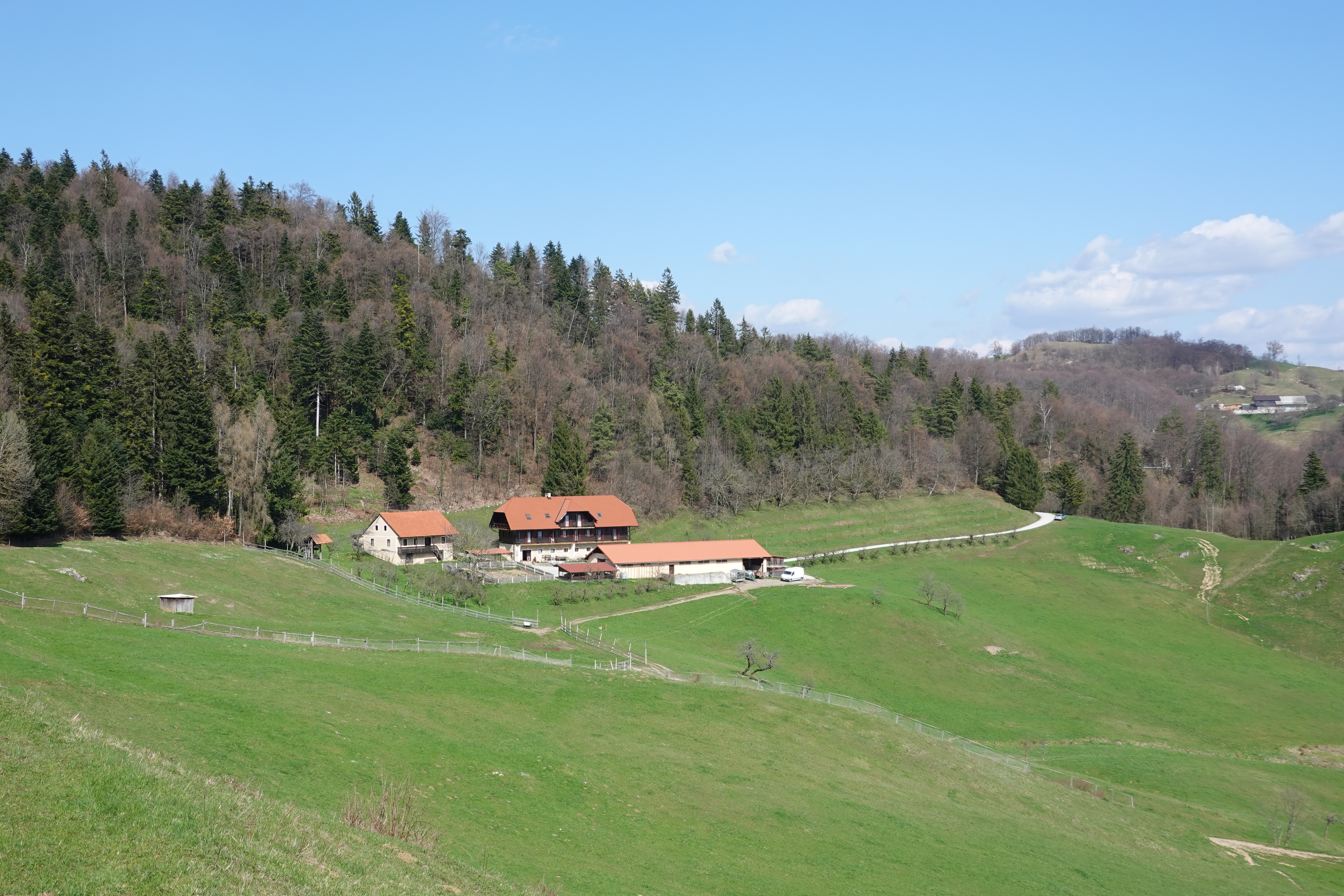
Dobrova, Krško

Dobrova (pronounced [ˈdoːbɾɔʋa]) is a settlement in the hills north of Senovo in the Municipality of Krško in eastern Slovenia. It is a dispersed settlement made up of smaller hamlets such as Bukovšica, Dobrova, Na Terogu, Prebkovje, Puste Ložice, and Plešivec, as well as isolated farms. The area is part of the traditional region of Styria. It is now included with the rest of the municipality in the Lower Sava Statistical Region.
