= Stolovnik =

- Location in Slovenia
- Coordinates: 45°59′49.25″N 15°29′53.5″E
- Country: Slovenia
- Traditional region: Styria
- Statistical region: Lower Sava
- Municipality: Krško

Area
  - Total: 2.93 km^{2} (1.13 sq mi)
- Elevation: 254.2 m (834 ft)

Population (2002)
  - Total: 250
- Postal code: 8280

Stolovnik (pronounced [stɔlɔu̯ˈniːk]) is a dispersed settlement east of Brestanica in the Municipality of Krško in eastern Slovenia. The area is part of the traditional region of Styria. It is now included with the rest of the municipality in the Lower Sava Statistical Region.
