= Veliki Dol, Krško =

Veliki Dol
- Location in Slovenia
- Coordinates: 46°1′19.66″N 15°32′7.76″E
- Country: Slovenia
- Traditional region: Styria
- Statistical region: Lower Sava
- Municipality: Krško

Area
  - Total: 2.77 km^{2} (1.07 sq mi)
- Elevation: 274.9 m (902 ft)

Population (2002)
  - Total: 140

Veliki Dol (pronounced [ˈʋeːliki ˈdoːu̯]) is a settlement in the hills north of Krško in eastern Slovenia. The area is part of the traditional region of Styria. It is now included in the Lower Sava Statistical Region.
