= Goli Vrh, Krško =

Goli Vrh
- Location in Slovenia
- Coordinates: 45°54′37.61″N 15°23′2.34″E
- Country: Slovenia
- Traditional region: Lower Carniola
- Statistical region: Lower Sava
- Municipality: Krško

Area
  - Total: 0.18 km^{2} (0.069 sq mi)
- Elevation: 193.1 m (634 ft)

Population (2002)
  - Total: 14
- Postal code: 8274

Goli Vrh (pronounced [ˈɡɔːli ˈʋəɾx]) is a small settlement south of Raka in the Municipality of Krško in eastern Slovenia. It lies just north of the A2 motorway from Ljubljana to Zagreb. The area is part of the traditional region of Lower Carniola. It is now included in the Lower Sava Statistical Region.
