= Ardro pod Velikim Trnom =

Ardro pod Velikim Trnom Ardro (until 1953)
- Location in Slovenia
- Coordinates: 45°57′37.96″N 15°23′22.64″E
- Country: Slovenia
- Traditional region: Lower Carniola
- Statistical region: Lower Sava
- Municipality: Krško

Area
  - Total: 0.71 km^{2} (0.27 sq mi)
- Elevation: 377.3 m (1,238 ft)

Population (2002)
  - Total: 21

Ardro pod Velikim Trnom (pronounced [ˈaːɾdɾɔ pɔt ˈʋeːlikim ˈtəɾnɔm]) is a small settlement in the hills east of Krško in eastern Slovenia. The area is part of the traditional region of Lower Carniola. It is now included with the rest of the municipality in the Lower Sava Statistical Region.

== Name ==
The name of the settlement was changed from Ardro to Ardro pod Velikim Trnom in 1953.
