= Stari Grad v Podbočju =

Stari Grad v Podbočju Stari Grad (until 1953)
- Location in Slovenia
- Coordinates: 45°51′21.38″N 15°28′28.28″E
- Country: Slovenia
- Traditional region: Lower Carniola
- Statistical region: Lower Sava
- Municipality: Krško

Area
  - Total: 1.47 km^{2} (0.57 sq mi)
- Elevation: 319.8 m (1,049 ft)

Population (2002)
  - Total: 6
- Postal code: 8312

Stari Grad v Podbočju (pronounced [ˈstàːɾi ˈɡɾáːt ʍ pɔdˈbóːtʃju], German: Oedenschloß) is a settlement south of Podbočje in the Municipality of Krško in eastern Slovenia. The area is part of the traditional region of Lower Carniola and is now included with the rest of the municipality in the Lower Sava Statistical Region.

== Name ==
The name of the settlement was changed from Stari Grad to Stari Grad v Podbočju in 1953. In the past it was known as Oedenschloß in German.

== Cultural heritage ==
The site of a 13th-century medieval castle in the settlement was excavated and shown to have been occupied from the Early Iron Age with Hallstatt period and La Tène period occupation levels. Roman artefacts were also found. By 1581 the site of the castle is known from written sources to have been abandoned.
