= Pesje =

- Village
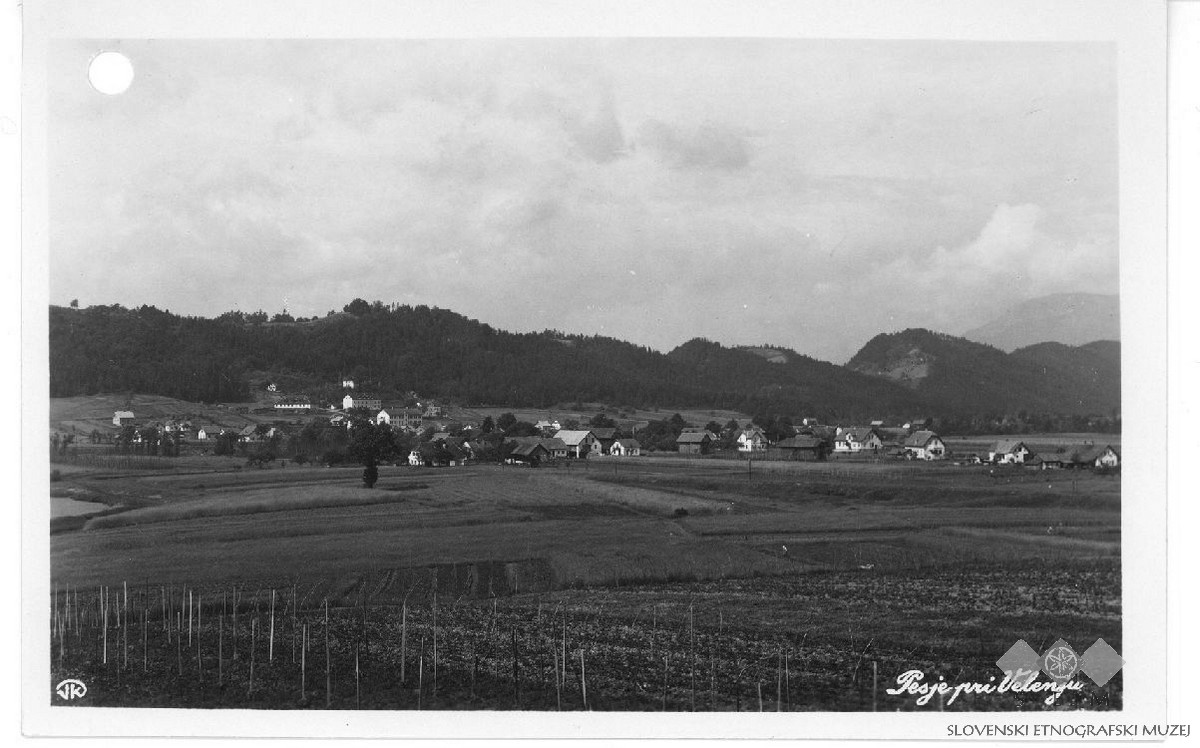
- Postcard of Pesje

- Location in Slovenia
- Coordinates: 45°56′27.81″N 15°33′14.58″E
- Country: Slovenia
- Traditional region: Styria
- Statistical region: Lower Sava
- Municipality: Krško

Area
  - Total: 3.48 km^{2} (1.34 sq mi)
- Elevation: 163.9 m (538 ft)

Population (2002)
  - Total: 76
- Postal code: 8253

Pesje (pronounced [ˈpeːsjɛ], German: Hundsdorf) is a settlement on the left bank of the Sava River in the Municipality of Krško in eastern Slovenia. The area is part of the traditional region of Lower Carniola. It is now included with the rest of the municipality in the Lower Sava Statistical Region.
