= Dedni Vrh, Krško =

Dedni Vrh
- Location in Slovenia
- Coordinates: 45°55′53.78″N 15°24′20.39″E
- Country: Slovenia
- Traditional region: Lower Carniola
- Statistical region: Lower Sava
- Municipality: Krško

Area
  - Total: 0.33 km^{2} (0.13 sq mi)
- Elevation: 222.7 m (731 ft)

Population (2002)
  - Total: 3
- Postal code: 8274

Dedni Vrh (pronounced [ˈdeːdni ˈʋəɾx]; German: Dedenberg) is a small dispersed settlement in the hills east of Raka in the Municipality of Krško in eastern Slovenia. The area is part of the traditional region of Lower Carniola. It is now included with the rest of the municipality in the Lower Sava Statistical Region.
