= Anovec =

- Location in Slovenia
- Coordinates: 45°58′42.34″N 15°31′43.94″E
- Country: Slovenia
- Traditional region: Lower Carniola
- Statistical region: Lower Sava
- Municipality: Krško

Area
  - Total: 1.7 km^{2} (0.66 sq mi)
- Elevation: 306.9 m (1,007 ft)

Population (2002)
  - Total: 67

Anovec (pronounced [ˈaːnɔʋəts], German: Anovetz) is a settlement in the hills northeast of Krško in eastern Slovenia. The area is part of the traditional region of Lower Carniola. It is now included with the rest of the Municipality of Krško in the Lower Sava Statistical Region.
