= Libna =

- Location in Slovenia
- Coordinates: 45°57′10.19″N 15°31′8.23″E
- Country: Slovenia
- Traditional region: Styria
- Statistical region: Lower Sava
- Municipality: Krško

Area
  - Total: 2.21 km^{2} (0.85 sq mi)
- Elevation: 302.4 m (992 ft)

Population (2018)
  - Total: 188
- Postal code: 8270

Libna (pronounced [ˈliːbna], in older sources Libno, German: Loibenberg) is a settlement in the hills immediately east of the town of Krško in eastern Slovenia. The area is part of the traditional region of Styria. It is now included with the rest of the municipality in the Lower Sava Statistical Region.

The local church is dedicated to Saint Margaret (Slovene: sveta Marjeta) and belongs to the Parish of Videm–Krško. It has a rectangular nave with a three-sided apse and dates to 1580. It was restyled in the Baroque style in 1765.
