= Smednik =

- Location in Slovenia
- Coordinates: 45°54′32.86″N 15°22′29.36″E
- Country: Slovenia
- Traditional region: Lower Carniola
- Statistical region: Lower Sava
- Municipality: Krško

Area
  - Total: 0.45 km^{2} (0.17 sq mi)
- Elevation: 178.1 m (584 ft)

Population (2002)
  - Total: 80
- Postal code: 8274

Smednik (pronounced [ˈsmeːdnik]) is a small settlement south of Raka in the Municipality of Krško in eastern Slovenia. It lies just north of the A2 motorway from Ljubljana to Zagreb. The area is part of the traditional region of Lower Carniola. It is now included with the rest of the municipality in the Lower Sava Statistical Region.

There is a small chapel-shrine in the settlement. It is dedicated to the Virgin Mary and was built in the late 19th century.
