= Dobrava pod Rako =

Dobrava pod Rako Dobrava (until 1953)
- Location in Slovenia
- Coordinates: 45°54′43.6″N 15°22′14.12″E
- Country: Slovenia
- Traditional region: Lower Carniola
- Statistical region: Lower Sava
- Municipality: Krško

Area
  - Total: 0.2 km^{2} (0.077 sq mi)
- Elevation: 163.7 m (537 ft)

Population (2002)
  - Total: 19

Dobrava pod Rako (pronounced [dɔˈbɾaːʋa pɔd ˈɾaːkɔ]) is a small settlement to the south of Raka in the Municipality of Krško in eastern Slovenia. The area is part of the traditional region of Lower Carniola. It is now included in the Lower Sava Statistical Region.

== Name ==
The name of the settlement was changed from Dobrava to Dobrava pod Rako in 1953.
