= Koritnica, Krško =

Koritnica
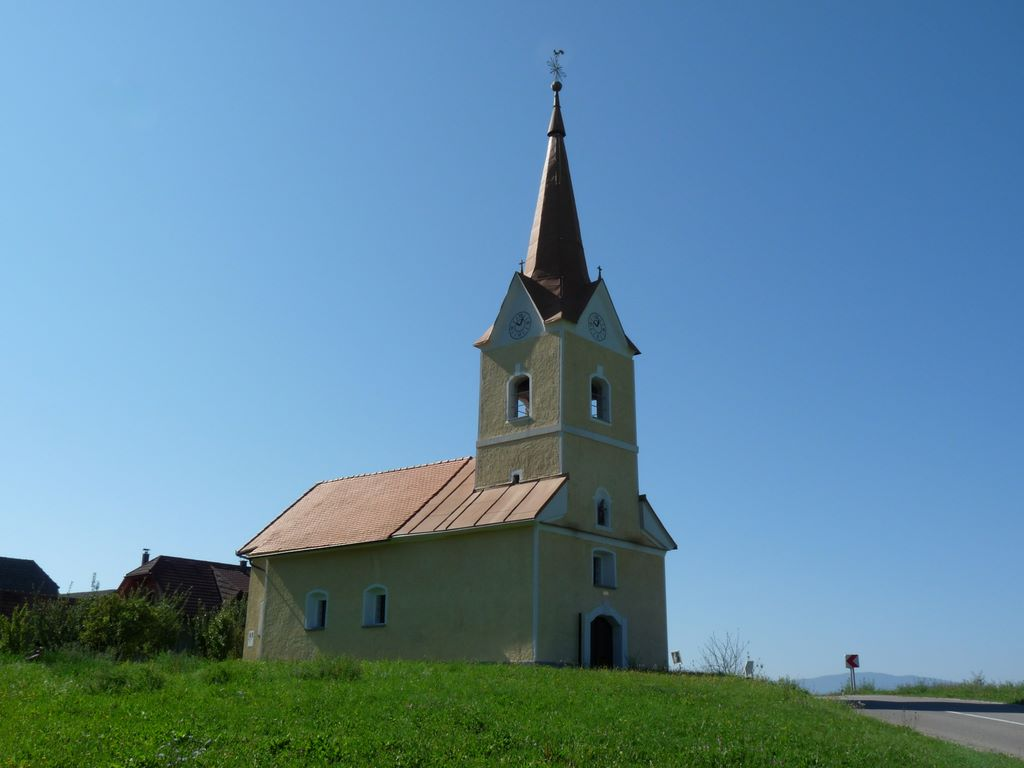
- Saint Peter's Church in Koritnica

- Location in Slovenia
- Coordinates: 45°56′42.27″N 15°21′38.7″E
- Country: Slovenia
- Traditional region: Lower Carniola
- Statistical region: Lower Sava
- Municipality: Krško

Area
  - Total: 0.15 km^{2} (0.058 sq mi)
- Elevation: 314 m (1,030 ft)

Population (2002)
  - Total: 25
- Postal code: 8274

Koritnica (pronounced [kɔˈɾiːtnitsa]) is a small settlement northwest of Raka in the Municipality of Krško in eastern Slovenia. The area is part of the traditional region of Lower Carniola. It is now included with the rest of the municipality in the Lower Sava Statistical Region.

The local church is dedicated to Saint Peter and belongs to the Parish of Raka. It is a Baroque church dating to the 17th century.
