= Ivandol, Slovenia =

Ivandol Ivan Dol (until 1990)
- Location in Slovenia
- Coordinates: 45°57′15.04″N 15°26′0.37″E
- Country: Slovenia
- Traditional region: Lower Carniola
- Statistical region: Lower Sava
- Municipality: Krško

Area
  - Total: 0.38 km^{2} (0.15 sq mi)
- Elevation: 362.3 m (1,189 ft)

Population (2002)
  - Total: 28

Ivandol (pronounced [iʋanˈdoːl]) is a small settlement in the hills west of Leskovec in the Municipality of Krško in eastern Slovenia. The area is part of the traditional region of Lower Carniola. It is now included with the rest of the municipality in the Lower Sava Statistical Region.

== Name ==
The name of the settlement was changed from Ivan Dol to Ivandol in 1990.
