= Senuše =

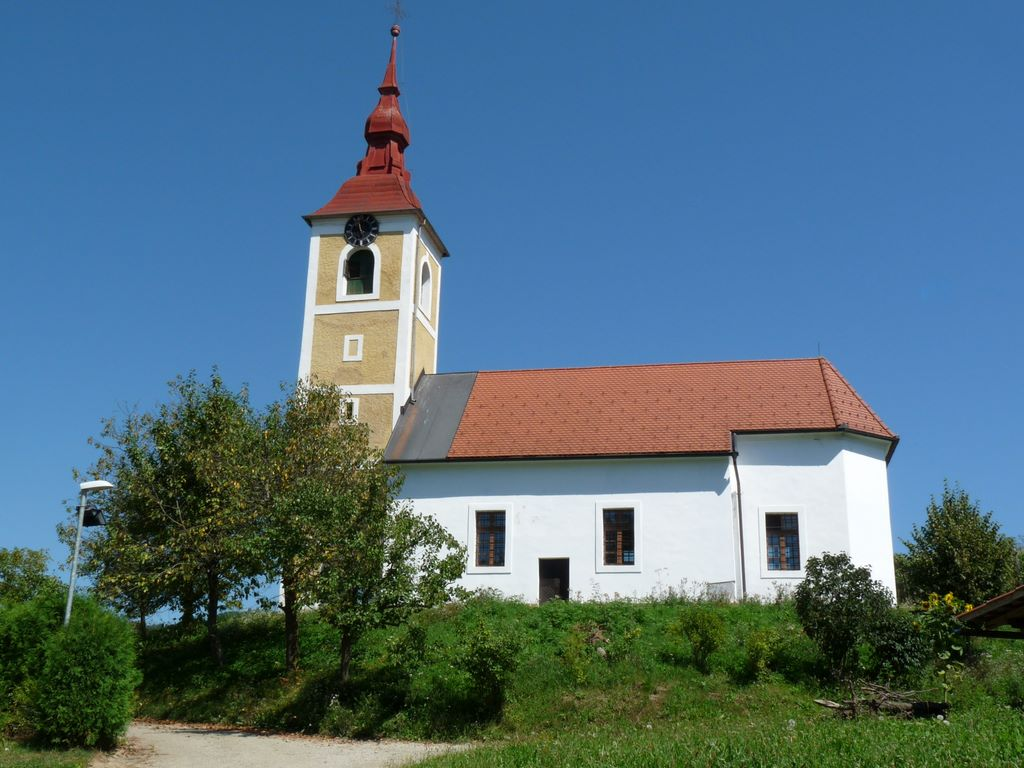
- Saint Lucy's Church in Senuše

- Location in Slovenia
- Coordinates: 45°56′10.99″N 15°25′37.59″E
- Country: Slovenia
- Traditional region: Lower Carniola
- Statistical region: Lower Sava
- Municipality: Krško

Area
  - Total: 3.53 km^{2} (1.36 sq mi)
- Elevation: 171.2 m (562 ft)

Population (2002)
  - Total: 133
- Postal code: 8273

Senuše (pronounced [sɛˈnuːʃɛ]; German: Senusche) is a village west of Leskovec pri Krškem in the Municipality of Krško in eastern Slovenia. The area is part of the traditional region of Lower Carniola. It is now included in the Lower Sava Statistical Region.

The local church is dedicated to Saint Lucy and belongs to the Parish of Leskovec pri Krškem. It is a late Gothic building with a rectangular nave and a western belfry that was rebuilt in 1852. A Roman tombstone is incorporated into the western wall of the nave.
