= Gornje Pijavško =

Gornje Pijavško Gorenje Pijavško (until 1990)
- Location in Slovenia
- Coordinates: 45°59′6.69″N 15°25′2.24″E
- Country: Slovenia
- Traditional region: Lower Carniola
- Statistical region: Lower Sava
- Municipality: Krško

Area
  - Total: 1.29 km^{2} (0.50 sq mi)
- Elevation: 171.8 m (564 ft)

Population (2002)
  - Total: 91
- Postal code: 8270

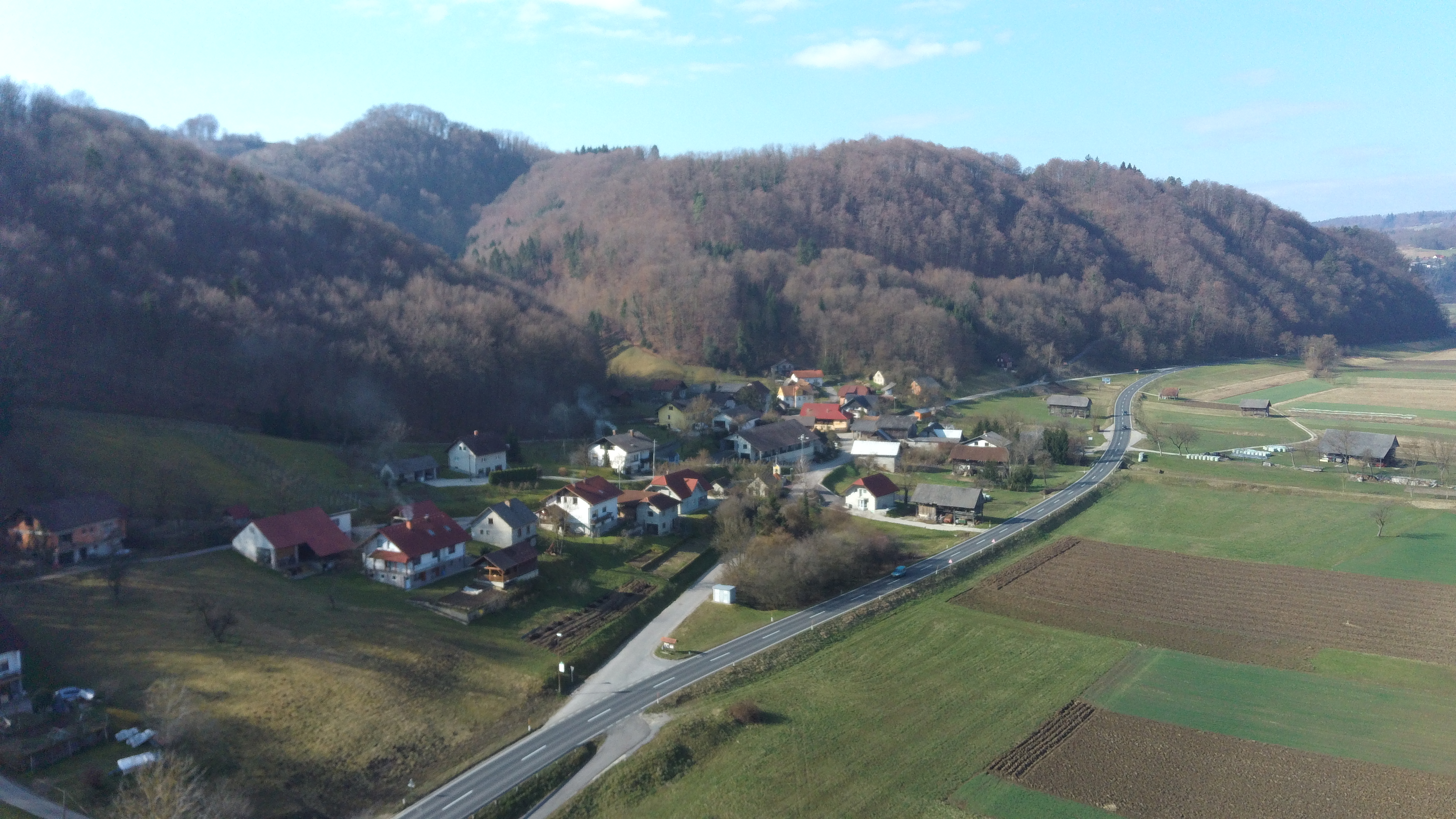

Gornje Pijavško (pronounced [ˈɡoːɾnjɛ piˈjaːu̯ʃkɔ]; German: Oberpiauschko) is a village on the right bank of the Sava River in the Municipality of Krško in eastern Slovenia. The area is part of the traditional region of Lower Carniola. It is now included in the Lower Sava Statistical Region.

== Name ==
The name of the settlement was changed from Gorenje Pijavško to Gornje Pijavško in 1990. In the past the German name was Oberpiauschko.
