= Brezje =

Brezje may refer to:

Bosnia and Herzegovina

- Brezje, Čelić, a village
- Brezje (Goražde), a village
- Brezje (Rogatica), a village in Republika Srpska
- Brezje (Višegrad), a village

Croatia

- Brezje, Sveta Nedelja, a village near Sveta Nedelja, Zagreb County
- Brezje, Dubrava, a village near Dubrava, Zagreb County
- Brezje, Krapina-Zagorje County, a village near Gornja Stubica
- Brezje, Međimurje County, a village near Sveti Juraj na Bregu
- Brezje Dobransko, a village near Skrad
- Brezje Dravsko, a village near Cestica, Varaždin County
- Brezje Miholečko, a village near Sveti Petar Orehovec
- Brezje Vivodinsko, a village near Ozalj

Slovenia:

- Brezje, Cerknica – Municipality of Cerknica, southwestern Slovenia
- Brezje, Mozirje – Municipality of Mozirje, northeastern Slovenia
- Brezje, Novo Mesto – City Municipality of Novo Mesto, southeastern Slovenia
- Brezje, Radovljica – Municipality of Radovljica, northwestern Slovenia
- Brezje, Sevnica – Municipality of Sevnica, southeastern Slovenia
- Brezje, Škofljica – Municipality of Škofljica, central Slovenia
- Brezje, Sveti Jurij ob Ščavnici – Municipality of Sveti Jurij ob Ščavnici, northeastern Slovenia
- Brezje, Zagorje ob Savi – Municipality of Zagorje ob Savi, central Slovenia
- Brezje nad Kamnikom – Municipality of Kamnik, northern Slovenia
- Brezje ob Slomu – Municipality of Šentjur, eastern Slovenia
- Brezje pod Nanosom – Municipality of Postojna, southwestern Slovenia
- Brezje pri Bojsnem – Municipality of Brežice, southeastern Slovenia
- Brezje pri Dobjem – Municipality of Dobje, eastern Slovenia
- Brezje pri Dobrovi – Municipality of Dobrova-Polhov Gradec, northwestern Slovenia
- Brezje pri Dobu – Municipality of Domžale, central Slovenia
- Brezje pri Dovškem – Municipality of Krško, southeastern Slovenia
- Brezje pri Grosupljem – Municipality of Grosuplje, southeastern Slovenia
- Brezje pri Kumpolju – Municipality of Litija, central Slovenia
- Brezje pri Lekmarju – Municipality of Šmarje pri Jelšah, eastern Slovenia
- Brezje pri Lipoglavu – City Municipality of Ljubljana, central Slovenia
- Brezje pri Ločah – Municipality of Slovenske Konjice, northeastern Slovenia
- Brezje pri Oplotnici – Municipality of Oplotnica, eastern Slovenia
- Brezje pri Podplatu – Municipality of Rogaška Slatina, northeastern Slovenia
- Brezje pri Poljčanah – Municipality of Slovenska Bistrica, northeastern Slovenia
- Brezje pri Raki – Municipality of Krško, southeastern Slovenia
- Brezje pri Rožnem Dolu – Municipality of Semič, southeastern Slovenia
- Brezje pri Senušah – Municipality of Krško, southeastern Slovenia
- Brezje pri Slovenski Bistrici – Municipality of Slovenska Bistrica, northeastern Slovenia
- Brezje pri Šentjerneju – Municipality of Šentjernej, southeastern Slovenia
- Brezje pri Trebelnem – Municipality of Trebnje, southeastern Slovenia
- Brezje pri Tržiču – Municipality of Tržič, northwestern Slovenia
- Brezje pri Veliki Dolini – Municipality of Brežice, southeastern Slovenia
- Brezje pri Vinjem Vrhu – Municipality of Semič, southeastern Slovenia
- Brezje v Podbočju – Municipality of Krško, southeastern Slovenia
- Brezovica pri Črmošnjicah – Municipality of Semič, known as Brezje until 1955, southeastern Slovenia
- Hudo Brezje – Municipality of Sevnica, southeastern Slovenia
- Staro Brezje – Municipality of Kočevje, southern Slovenia
