= Zgornje Poljčane =

Zgornje Poljčane Poljčane (until 1957)
- Location in Slovenia
- Coordinates: 46°18′9.73″N 15°35′0.72″E
- Country: Slovenia
- Traditional region: Styria
- Statistical region: Drava
- Municipality: Poljčane

Area
  - Total: 4.14 km^{2} (1.60 sq mi)
- Elevation: 276 m (906 ft)

Population (2002)
  - Total: 815

Zgornje Poljčane (pronounced [ˈzɡoːɾnjɛ pɔlˈtʃaːnɛ], formerly Poljčane, German: Pöltschach) is a settlement in the Municipality of Poljčane in northeastern Slovenia. It lies at the foothills of Mount Boč on the right bank of the Dravinja River. The area is part of the traditional region of Styria. It is now included with the rest of the municipality in the Drava Statistical Region.

== Name ==
The name of the settlement was changed from Poljčane to Zgornje Poljčane in 1957. The change was made because a new settlement called Poljčane was created that same year, when the former villages of Maharska Vas and Pekel were merged into a single settlement.

== Church ==
The parish church in the settlement is dedicated to the Holy Cross and belongs to the Roman Catholic Archdiocese of Maribor. It is a Romanesque building dating to the late 12th century. It has a Gothic belfry. In 1895 the church was extended and re-orientated with a complete new nave added. The sanctuary of the original church was converted to a side chapel.
