= Čača Vas =

- Location in Slovenia
- Coordinates: 46°15′42.91″N 15°36′21.35″E
- Country: Slovenia
- Traditional region: Styria
- Statistical region: Savinja
- Municipality: Rogaška Slatina

Area
  - Total: 4.15 km^{2} (1.60 sq mi)
- Elevation: 310.8 m (1,020 ft)

Population (2002)
  - Total: 169

Čača Vas (pronounced [ˈtʃaːtʃa ˈʋaːs]; Slovene: Čača vas, in older sources Čača Ves, German: Tschatschendorf) is a settlement at the foothills of Mount Boč in the Municipality of Rogaška Slatina in eastern Slovenia. The area belongs to the traditional Styria region and is now included in the Savinja Statistical Region.

The local church, built north of the settlement on the slopes of Mount Boč, is dedicated to Saint Margaret and belongs to the Parish of Kostrivnica. Its nave is Late Gothic and dates to 1545. The sanctuary and the belfry are from the 17th century.
