= Drevenik =

- Location in Slovenia
- Coordinates: 46°16′18.19″N 15°35′24.29″E
- Country: Slovenia
- Traditional region: Styria
- Statistical region: Savinja
- Municipality: Rogaška Slatina

Area
  - Total: 4.02 km^{2} (1.55 sq mi)
- Elevation: 427.9 m (1,404 ft)

Population (2002)
  - Total: 67

Drevenik (pronounced [dɾɛʋɛˈniːk]) is a settlement on the southern slopes of Mount Boč in the Municipality of Rogaška Slatina in eastern Slovenia. The area belongs to the traditional Styria region and is now included in the Savinja Statistical Region.

== Landmarks ==
=== Churches ===
There are two churches in the settlement. The church in the southern part of the settlement is dedicated to Saint Leonard and is a Gothic building dating to the 15th century with a 17th-century belfry. The church further up Mount Boč is dedicated to Saint Nicholas and originally dates to the 16th century with some rebuilding in the mid-17th century. Both belong to the Parish of Kostrivnica.
