= Velike Rodne =

- Location in Slovenia
- Coordinates: 46°13′41.41″N 15°37′27.22″E
- Country: Slovenia
- Traditional region: Styria
- Statistical region: Savinja
- Municipality: Rogaška Slatina

Area
  - Total: 0.98 km^{2} (0.38 sq mi)
- Elevation: 342.7 m (1,124 ft)

Population (2002)
  - Total: 152

Velike Rodne (pronounced [ˈʋeːlikɛ ˈɾoːdnɛ]) is a settlement in the Municipality of Rogaška Slatina in eastern Slovenia. It lies south of the town of Rogaška Slatina, between Topole and Prnek. The wider area around Rogaška Slatina is part of the traditional region of Styria. It is now included in the Savinja Statistical Region.

== Name ==
The name Velike Rodne ('big Rodne') distinguishes the settlement from nearby Male Rodne ('little Rodne'). The plural name Rodne and names like it (e.g., Rodine) are derived from the common noun *rodina 'untilled land', thus referring to a local geographical feature.
