= Rajnkovec =

- Location in Slovenia
- Coordinates: 46°12′49.29″N 15°38′20.28″E
- Country: Slovenia
- Traditional region: Styria
- Statistical region: Savinja
- Municipality: Rogaška Slatina

Area
  - Total: 0.78 km^{2} (0.30 sq mi)
- Elevation: 240 m (790 ft)

Population (2002)
  - Total: 78

Rajnkovec (pronounced [ˈɾaːi̯nkɔʋəts]) is a small settlement in the Municipality of Rogaška Slatina in eastern Slovenia, next to the border with Croatia. It lies south of the town of Rogaška Slatina, on a side road leading to the villages of Pristavica and Nimno. The area belongs to the traditional Styria region and is now included in the Savinja Statistical Region.
