= Globoko, Radovljica =

Globoko
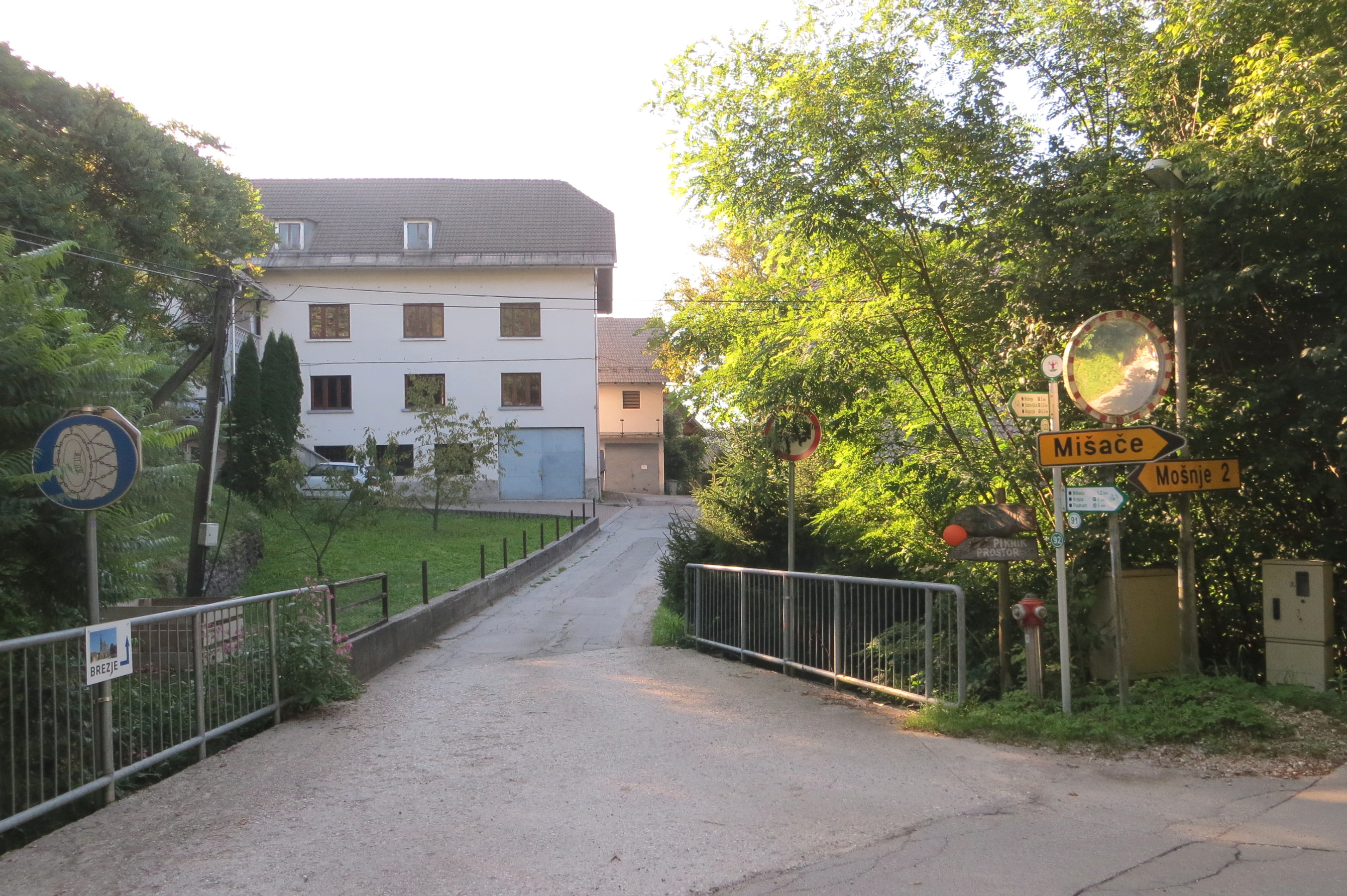

- Location in Slovenia
- Coordinates: 46°19′24.04″N 14°12′33.3″E
- Country: Slovenia
- Traditional region: Upper Carniola
- Statistical region: Upper Carniola
- Municipality: Radovljica
- Elevation: 402 m (1,319 ft)

Population (2002)
  - Total: 31

Globoko (pronounced [ɡlɔˈboːkɔ] or [ɡlɔˈbɔːkɔ]) is a small settlement on the left bank of the Sava River in the Municipality of Radovljica in the Upper Carniola region of Slovenia.

== Geography ==
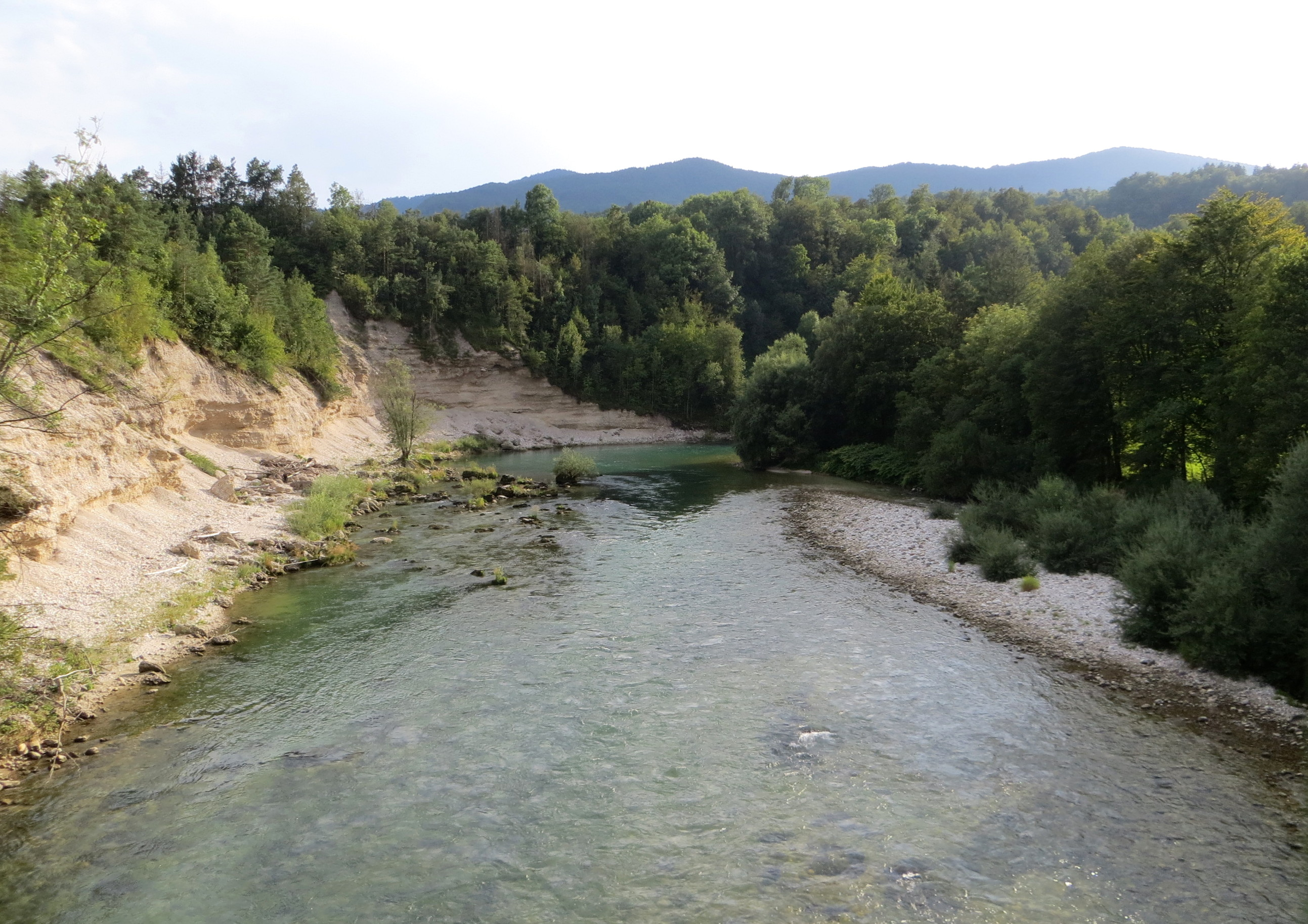
The Sava River at Globoko

Globoko is located in a basin at the confluence of Dobruša Creek with the Sava River. Dobruša Creek flows through Globoko from the north, from the Otok Valley (Otoški graben). There are tilled fields on the terraces above the village.

== Name ==
The name Globoko is shared by several villages in Slovenia (cf. Globoko ob Dravinji, Malo Globoko, etc.). The name arose through ellipsis of *Globoko selo (literally, 'deep village'), referring to a village located in a basin or hollow.

== Notable people ==
Notable people that were born or lived in Globoko include:

- Valentin Benedičič (1903–1984), beekeeper
