= Rodine =

Rodine may refer to:

== Places ==
- Rodine, Črnomelj, a settlement in the Municipality of Črnomelj, Slovenia
- Rodine pri Trebnjem, a settlement in the Municipality of Trebnje, Slovenia
- Rodine, Žirovnica, a settlement in the Municipality of Žirovnica, Slovenia

== Other ==
- Rodine, a former brand of acid corrosion inhibitor manufactured by Henkel KGaA and currently rebranded to "Bonderite"
- Rodine, a brand of rodenticide containing yellow phosphorus, manufactured by Rentokil Initial

== See also ==
- Roedean, East Sussex
- Roedean School
