= Gabrnik =

Gabrnik is a Slovene place name that may refer to:

- Gabernik, a settlement in the Municipality of Slovenska Bistrica, northeastern Slovenia, sometimes spelled Gabrnik
- Gabrnik, Juršinci, a settlement in the Municipality of Juršinci, northeastern Slovenia
- Gabrnik, Škocjan, a settlement in the Municipality of Škocjan, southeastern Slovenia
- Spodnji Gabernik (formerly Spodnji Gabrnik), a settlement in the Municipality of Rogaška Slatina, northeastern Slovenia
- Zgornji Gabrnik, a settlement in the Municipality of Rogaška Slatina, northeastern Slovenia
