= Maharska Vas =

- Location in Slovenia
- Coordinates: 46°18′49″N 15°34′43″E
- Country: Slovenia
- Traditional region: Styria
- Statistical region: Drava
- Municipality: Poljčane
- Elevation: 260 m (850 ft)

Maharska Vas (pronounced [ˈmaːxaɾska ˈʋaːs], Slovene: Maharska vas, in older sources Maharčka vas or Marhačka vas, German: Marchendorf) is a former village in central Slovenia in the Municipality of Poljčane. It is now part of the town of Poljčane. It is part of the traditional region of Styria and is now included in the Drava Statistical Region.

== Geography ==
Maharska Vas lies on the left bank of Brežnica Creek at the junction of the roads to Spodnja Brežnica and Laporje.

== Name ==
Maharska Vas was attested in historical sources in 1490 as Marcherstorf. It is probably derived from the personal name Mahar, and the toponym therefore means 'Mahar's village', referring to an early resident of the place. Other place names derived from the personal name Mahar include Maharovec.

== History ==
Maharska Vas ceased to exist as a separate settlement in 1957, when it and the former village of Pekel pri Poljčanah were merged into a single settlement named Poljčane.
