= Vinec =

Vinec may refer to places:

- Vinec (Mladá Boleslav District), a municipality and village in the Czech Republic
- Vinec, Rogaška Slatina, a settlement in Slovenia
