= Lovnik =

- Location in Slovenia
- Coordinates: 46°16′40.46″N 15°33′30.08″E
- Country: Slovenia
- Traditional region: Styria
- Statistical region: Drava
- Municipality: Poljčane

Area
  - Total: 1.73 km^{2} (0.67 sq mi)
- Elevation: 347.8 m (1,141 ft)

Population (2002)
  - Total: 36

Lovnik (pronounced [ˈloːu̯nik]) is a small settlement on the western slopes of Mount Boč in the Municipality of Poljčane in northeastern Slovenia. The area is part of the traditional region of Styria. It is now included with the rest of the municipality in the Drava Statistical Region.
