= Kamna Gorica =

Kamna Gorica may refer to several places in Slovenia:

- Kamna Gorca, a settlement in the Municipality of Rogaška Slatina
- Kamna Gorica, Ljubljana, a former village in the City Municipality of Ljubljana
- Kamna Gorica, Radovljica, a settlement in the Municipality of Radovljica
