= Strmec pri Svetem Florijanu =

Strmec pri Svetem Florijanu Strmec (pri Rogatcu) (until 1993)
- Location in Slovenia
- Coordinates: 46°15′29.76″N 15°41′38.28″E
- Country: Slovenia
- Traditional region: Styria
- Statistical region: Savinja
- Municipality: Rogaška Slatina

Area
  - Total: 4.32 km^{2} (1.67 sq mi)
- Elevation: 270.2 m (886 ft)

Population (2002)
  - Total: 171

Strmec pri Svetem Florijanu (pronounced [ˈstəɾməts pɾi ˈsʋeːtɛɱ flɔɾiˈjaːnu]) is a settlement in the Municipality of Rogaška Slatina in eastern Slovenia. The entire area is part of the traditional region of Styria. It is now included in the Savinja Statistical Region.

== Name ==
The name of the settlement was changed from Strmec to Strmec pri Rogatcu (literally, 'Strmec near Rogatec') in 1953. The name was changed again to Strmec pri Svetem Florjanu (literally, 'Strmec near Saint Florian') in 1993.

== Church ==
The local church, built on Ložno Hill north of the main settlement, is dedicated to the Virgin of Loreto and belongs to the Parish of Sveti Florijan ob Boču. It was first mentioned in written documents dating to 1765.
