= Ljubično =

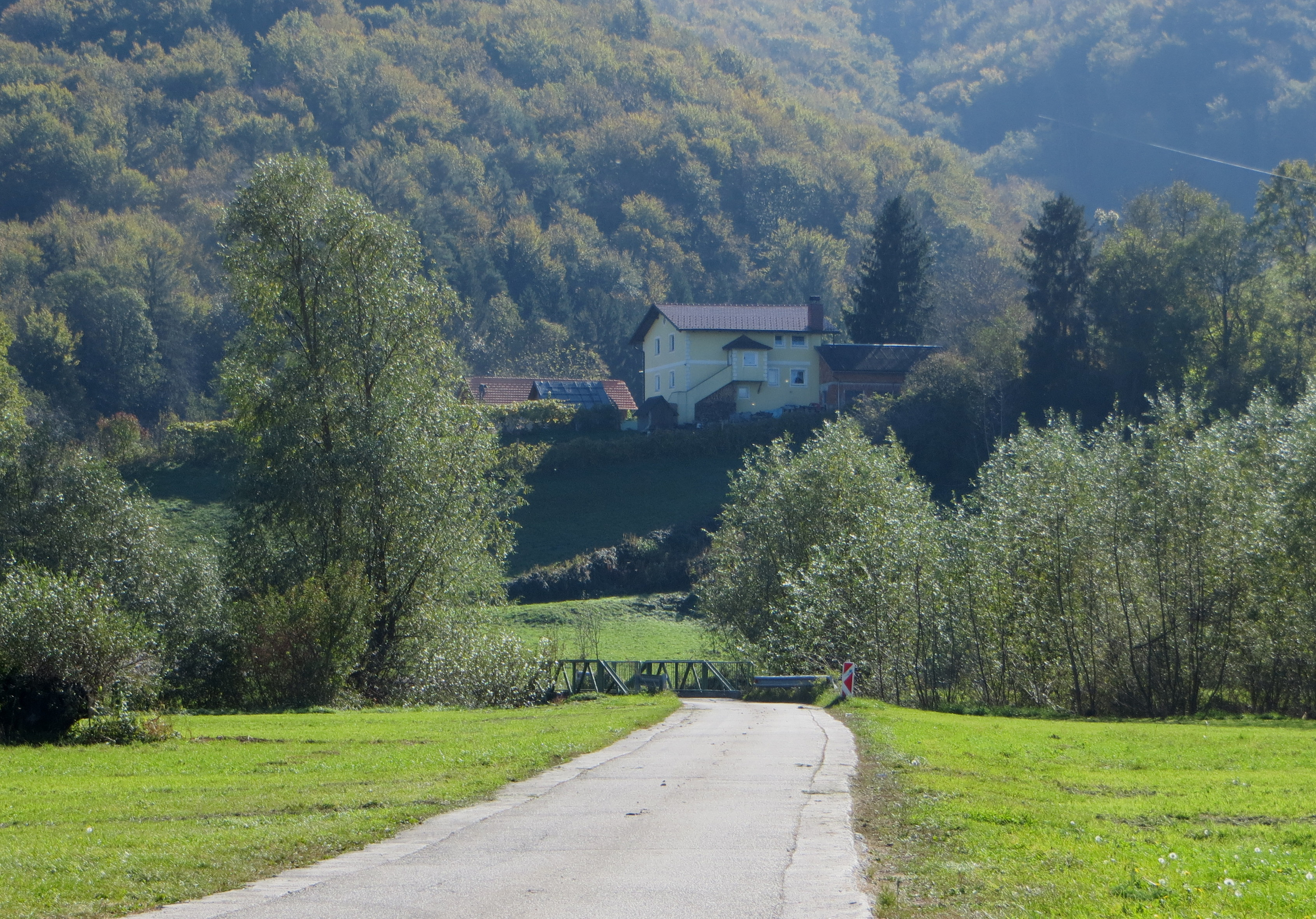

- Location in Slovenia
- Coordinates: 46°17′53.25″N 15°33′49.52″E
- Country: Slovenia
- Traditional region: Styria
- Statistical region: Drava
- Municipality: Poljčane

Area
  - Total: 2.65 km^{2} (1.02 sq mi)
- Elevation: 384.3 m (1,261 ft)

Population (2002)
  - Total: 55

Ljubično (pronounced [ljuˈbiːtʃnɔ]) is a settlement in the Municipality of Poljčane in northeastern Slovenia. It lies at the western foothills of Mount Boč, above the right bank of the Dravinja River. The area is part of the traditional region of Styria. It is now included with the rest of the municipality in the Drava Statistical Region.
