= Irje =

- Location in Slovenia
- Coordinates: 46°15′28.8″N 15°38′4.95″E
- Country: Slovenia
- Traditional region: Styria
- Statistical region: Savinja
- Municipality: Rogaška Slatina

Area
  - Total: 2.62 km^{2} (1.01 sq mi)
- Elevation: 344.3 m (1,130 ft)

Population (2002)
  - Total: 295

Irje (pronounced [ˈiːɾjɛ]) is a settlement on the southern slopes of Mount Boč in the Municipality of Rogaška Slatina in eastern Slovenia. The entire area of Rogaška Slatina belongs to the traditional Styria region and is now included in the Savinja Statistical Region.
