= Tuncovec =

- Location in Slovenia
- Coordinates: 46°14′26.24″N 15°39′56.64″E
- Country: Slovenia
- Traditional region: Styria
- Statistical region: Savinja
- Municipality: Rogaška Slatina

Area
  - Total: 1.29 km^{2} (0.50 sq mi)
- Elevation: 237.8 m (780 ft)

Population (2002)
  - Total: 122

Tuncovec (pronounced [ˈtuːntsɔʋəts]) is a settlement in the Municipality of Rogaška Slatina in eastern Slovenia. It lies east of the town of Rogaška Slatina, between Spodnje Sečovo and Brezovec pri Rogatcu. The wider area around Rogaška Slatina is part of the traditional region of Styria. It is now included in the Savinja Statistical Region.

== Mass grave ==
Tuncovec is the site of a mass grave from the end of the Second World War. The Municipal Dump Mass Grave (Slovene: Grobišče pod komunalno deponijo) is located southeast of the settlement, between the local dump and a slope next to the former bed of Teršnica Creek. The grave contains an unknown number of Croatian refugees murdered in May 1945.
