= Lušečka Vas =

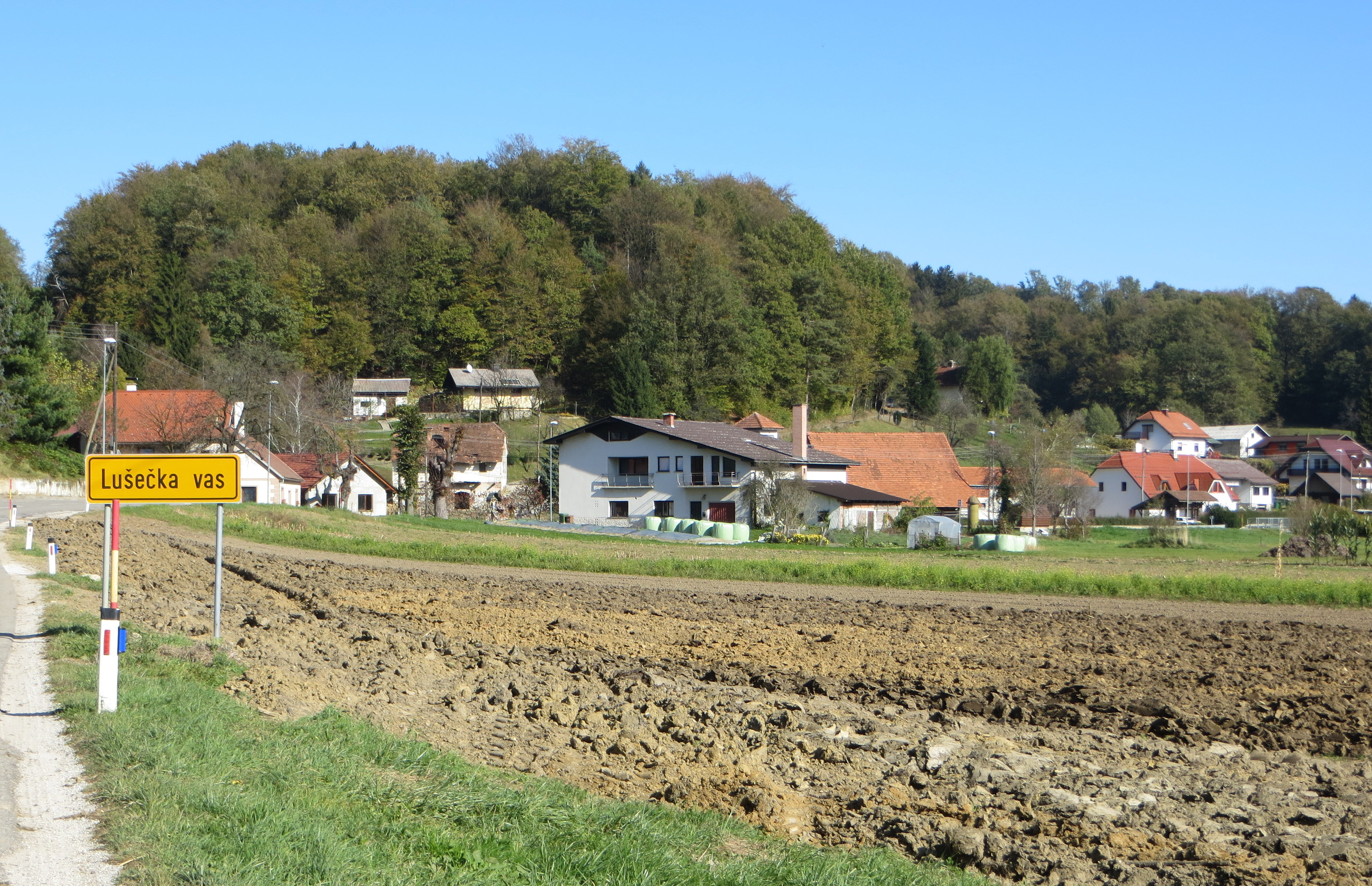

- Location in Slovenia
- Coordinates: 46°18′29.58″N 15°33′38.67″E
- Country: Slovenia
- Traditional region: Styria
- Statistical region: Drava
- Municipality: Poljčane

Area
  - Total: 2 km^{2} (0.77 sq mi)
- Elevation: 266.7 m (875 ft)

Population (2002)
  - Total: 247

Lušečka Vas (pronounced [luˈʃeːtʃka ˈʋaːs]; Slovene: Lušečka vas) is a village west of Poljčane in northeastern Slovenia. The area is part of the traditional region of Styria. It is now included with the rest of the Municipality of Poljčane in the Drava Statistical Region.
