= Rodine pri Trebnjem =

- Location in Slovenia
- Coordinates: 45°54′59.67″N 15°2′53.08″E
- Country: Slovenia
- Traditional region: Lower Carniola
- Statistical region: Southeast Slovenia
- Municipality: Trebnje

Area
  - Total: 1.66 km^{2} (0.64 sq mi)
- Elevation: 307.8 m (1,010 ft)

Population (2002)
  - Total: 77

Rodine pri Trebnjem (pronounced [ˈɾoːdinɛ pɾi ˈtɾeːbnjɛm]) is a small village northeast of Trebnje in eastern Slovenia. The area is part of the historical region of Lower Carniola. The Municipality of Trebnje is now included in the Southeast Slovenia Statistical Region.

== Name ==
The name of the settlement was changed from Rodine to Rodine pri Trebnjem in 1955. The plural name Rodine and names like it (e.g., Male Rodne, Velike Rodne) are derived from the common noun *rodina 'untilled land', thus referring to a local geographical feature.

== Cultural heritage ==
Two Iron Age burial mounds over 10 m in diameter have been identified near the settlement.
