= Podboč =

- Location in Slovenia
- Coordinates: 46°18′8.91″N 15°35′33.9″E
- Country: Slovenia
- Traditional region: Styria
- Statistical region: Drava
- Municipality: Poljčane

Area
  - Total: 0.55 km^{2} (0.21 sq mi)
- Elevation: 269.8 m (885 ft)

Population (2002)
  - Total: 20

Podboč (pronounced [pɔdˈboːtʃ]) is a small village in the Municipality of Poljčane in northeastern Slovenia. It lies on the right bank of the Dravinja River, below the northern slopes of Mount Boč. The area is part of the traditional region of Styria. It is now included with the rest of the municipality in the Drava Statistical Region.
