= Hrastovec =

Hrastovec may refer to:

- Hrastovec, Velenje
- Hrastovec, Zavrč
- Hrastovec pod Bočem
- Hrastovec v Slovenskih Goricah
