= Studenice =

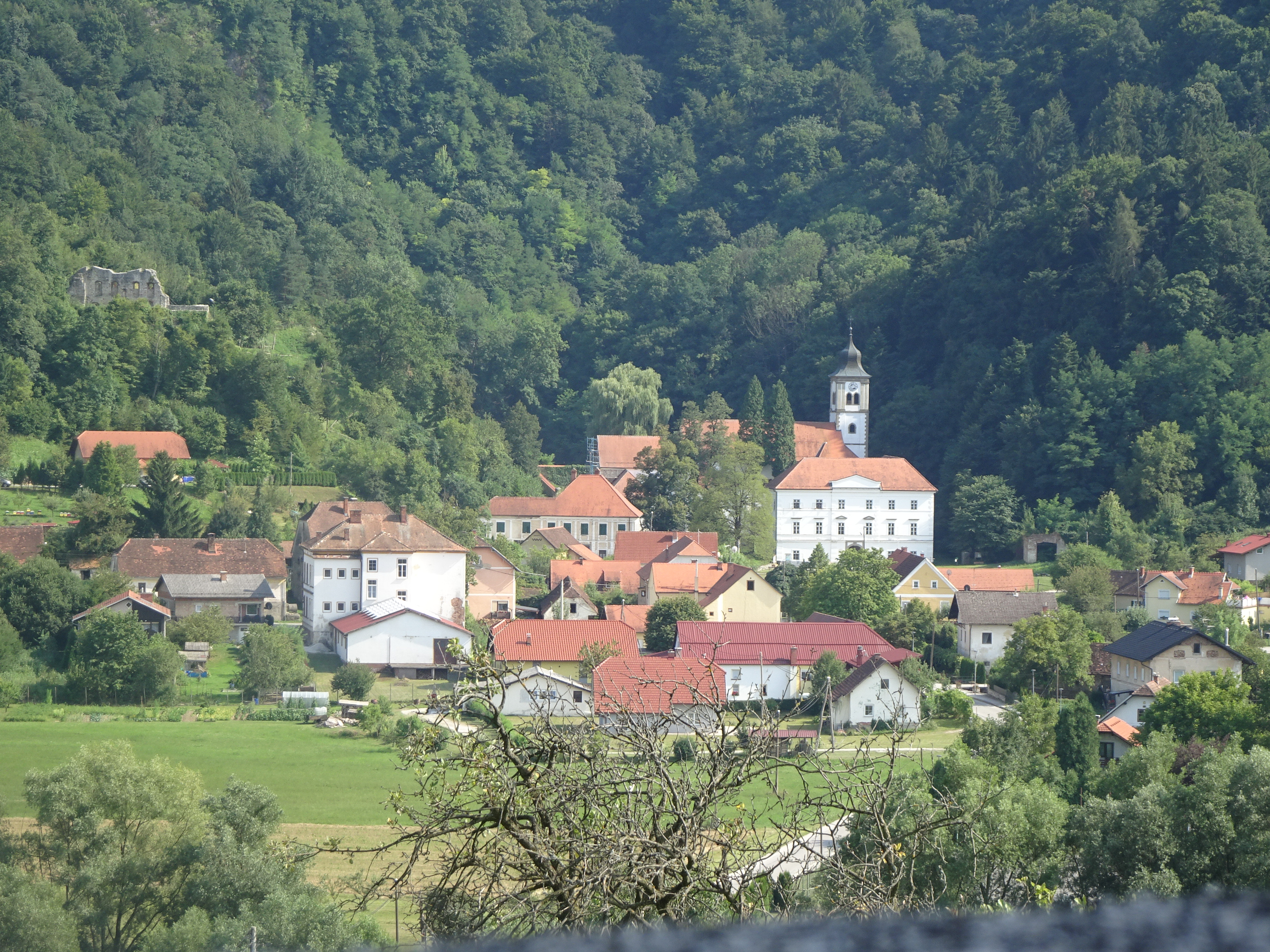

- Location in Slovenia
- Coordinates: 46°18′3.34″N 15°36′47.67″E
- Country: Slovenia
- Traditional region: Styria
- Statistical region: Drava
- Municipality: Poljčane

Area
  - Total: 4.52 km^{2} (1.75 sq mi)
- Elevation: 256.8 m (843 ft)

Population (2002)
  - Total: 147

Studenice (pronounced [studɛˈniːtsɛ]) is a settlement in the Municipality of Poljčane in northeastern Slovenia. It lies below the northern slopes of Mount Boč on both banks of the Dravinja River. The area is part of the traditional region of Styria. It is now included with the rest of the municipality in the Drava Statistical Region.

The parish church in the settlement is dedicated to the Three Kings and was part of a former Dominican convent, founded around 1245. The 13th-century church was restyled in the Baroque in the 17th century. The ruins of a castle used as a refuge from Ottoman raids, built in the late 15th century by the nuns from the local convent, can be seen on a hill above the settlement. It was burned down in a fire in 1788 and abandoned.
