= Stanovsko =

- Location in Slovenia
- Coordinates: 46°19′15.61″N 15°33′31.67″E
- Country: Slovenia
- Traditional region: Styria
- Statistical region: Drava
- Municipality: Poljčane

Area
  - Total: 2.86 km^{2} (1.10 sq mi)
- Elevation: 318.5 m (1,045 ft)

Population (2002)
  - Total: 228

Stanovsko (pronounced [staˈnoːu̯skɔ]) is a settlement in the Municipality of Poljčane in northeastern Slovenia. It is a dispersed settlement in the hills northwest of Poljčane. The area is part of the traditional region of Styria. It is now included with the rest of the municipality in the Drava Statistical Region.
