= Kamna Gora, Trebnje =

Kamna Gora
- Location in Slovenia
- Coordinates: 45°54′20″N 15°01′36″E
- Country: Slovenia
- Traditional region: Lower Carniola
- Statistical region: Southeast Slovenia
- Municipality: Trebnje
- Elevation: 283 m (928 ft)

Kamna Gora (pronounced [ˈkaːmna ˈɡɔːɾa], formerly Štamperg or Štamperk, German: Steinberg) is a former village in eastern Slovenia in the Municipality of Trebnje. It is now part of the town of Trebnje. It is part of the traditional region of Lower Carniola and is now included in the Southeast Slovenia Statistical Region.

== Geography ==
Kamna Gora is located east of the center of Trebnje along the road through the Temenica Valley. It includes the hamlet of Vina Gorica (a.k.a. Vinja Gora, German: Weinbüchel) about 300 meters (980 ft) to the north. A smaller hamlet northeast of the church is known as Štorovje. There are tilled fields to the north and northeast of the settlement, and meadows at lower elevations to the south that are subject to flooding by the Temenica.

== Name ==
The Slovene name of the settlement also appears as Kamna Gorica (a diminutive form) in some older sources, and it was sometimes written together with the hamlet of Vina Gorica in hyphenated form: Kamna gora-Vina gorica. Locally, it is known as Štamprk, based on the German name Steinberg. Both the German name Steinberg and the Slovene name Kamna Gora mean 'stone mountain', referring to the local geography and sharing its origin with similar toponyms such as Kamna Gorca and Kamna Gorica.

== History ==
In the 17th century, Kamna Gorica was the property of Count Johann Heinrich Wazenberg (1639–1709). Kamna Gora was annexed by Trebnje in 1972, ending its existence as a separate settlement.

== Church ==
There is a church in the hamlet of Vina Gorica dedicated to Our Lady of Sorrows. The current structure was built in 1972 to replace an older church, of which only the bell tower was preserved. The church had been owned by the nearby manor, and it was made a chapel of ease for the Parish of Trebnje in 1922.
