= Zgornje Negonje =

- Location in Slovenia
- Coordinates: 46°16′4.91″N 15°37′25.11″E
- Country: Slovenia
- Traditional region: Styria
- Statistical region: Savinja
- Municipality: Rogaška Slatina

Area
  - Total: 2.61 km^{2} (1.01 sq mi)
- Elevation: 477.1 m (1,565 ft)

Population (2002)
  - Total: 141

Zgornje Negonje (pronounced [ˈzɡoːɾnjɛ nɛˈɡoːnjɛ]) is a settlement in the Municipality of Rogaška Slatina in eastern Slovenia. It lies on the southeastern slopes of Mount Boč. The wider area around Rogaška Slatina is part of the traditional region of Styria. It is now included in the Savinja Statistical Region.

== Name ==
The name Zgornje Negonje means 'upper Negonje', distinguishing the village from neighboring Spodnje Negonje (literally, 'lower Negonje'), which lies at an elevation about 210 meters (690 ft) lower. The name Negonje is probably a possessive form of the personal name *Negojinъ, elided from *Negojin'e (selo) 'Negojinъ's (village)', referring to an early inhabitant of the place.
