= Zagaj pod Bočem =

- Location in Slovenia
- Coordinates: 46°15′17.56″N 15°36′36.48″E
- Country: Slovenia
- Traditional region: Styria
- Statistical region: Savinja
- Municipality: Rogaška Slatina

Area
  - Total: 1.71 km^{2} (0.66 sq mi)
- Elevation: 303.3 m (995 ft)

Population (2002)
  - Total: 156

Zagaj pod Bočem (pronounced [zaˈɡaːi̯ pɔd ˈboːtʃɛm]) is a settlement in the Municipality of Rogaška Slatina in eastern Slovenia. It lies at the southern foothills of Mount Boč. The wider area around Rogaška Slatina is part of the traditional region of Styria. It is now included in the Savinja Statistical Region.

== Name ==
The name of the settlement was changed from Zagaj to Zagaj pod Bočem in 1953.

== Cultural heritage ==
Evidence of a prehistoric settlement has been found near the village with earthworks (110 by 40 meters or 360 by 130 feet) and Hallstatt era pottery.
