= Spodnji Gabernik =

Spodnji Gabernik Spodnji Gabrnik (until 2002)
- Location in Slovenia
- Coordinates: 46°15′54.94″N 15°34′6.05″E
- Country: Slovenia
- Traditional region: Styria
- Statistical region: Savinja
- Municipality: Rogaška Slatina

Area
  - Total: 0.98 km^{2} (0.38 sq mi)
- Elevation: 258.8 m (849 ft)

Population (2017)
  - Total: 113

Spodnji Gabernik (pronounced [ˈspoːdnji ˈɡaːbəɾnik]) is a settlement in the Municipality of Rogaška Slatina in eastern Slovenia. The entire area is part of the traditional region of Styria. It is now included in the Savinja Statistical Region.

== Name ==
The name of the village was changed from Spodnji Gabrnik to Spodnji Gabernik in 2002.

== Church ==
The local church is dedicated to Saint Rosalia and belongs to the Parish of Kostrivnica. It was first mentioned in written documents dating to 1545, but the current single-nave building with a small bell tower saddling the roof at its western end was rebuilt in 1861.

== Notable people ==
Notable people that were born or lived in Spodnji Gabernik include:

- Bertha von Suttner (1843–1914), Austrian-Bohemian pacifist and novelist
