= Gabrovec pri Kostrivnici =

- Location in Slovenia
- Coordinates: 46°15′53.95″N 15°35′14.22″E
- Country: Slovenia
- Traditional region: Styria
- Statistical region: Savinja
- Municipality: Rogaška Slatina

Area
  - Total: 0.67 km^{2} (0.26 sq mi)
- Elevation: 296.4 m (972 ft)

Population (2002)
  - Total: 66

Gabrovec pri Kostrivnici (pronounced [ˈɡaːbɾɔʋəts pɾi kɔˈstɾiːu̯nitsi]) is a small settlement in the Municipality of Rogaška Slatina in eastern Slovenia. The entire area belongs to the traditional Styria region and is now included in the Savinja Statistical Region.

== Name ==
The name of the settlement was changed from Gabrovec to Gabrovec pri Kostrivici in 1953.

== Kostrivnica Castle ==
On a hill above the settlement, remains of a fortification ditch indicate the location of a medieval castle. Locals refer to the area as Stari grad ('old castle') and it is likely all that is left of Kostrivnica Castle, mentioned in documents dating to the 13th century.
