= Spodnje Poljčane =

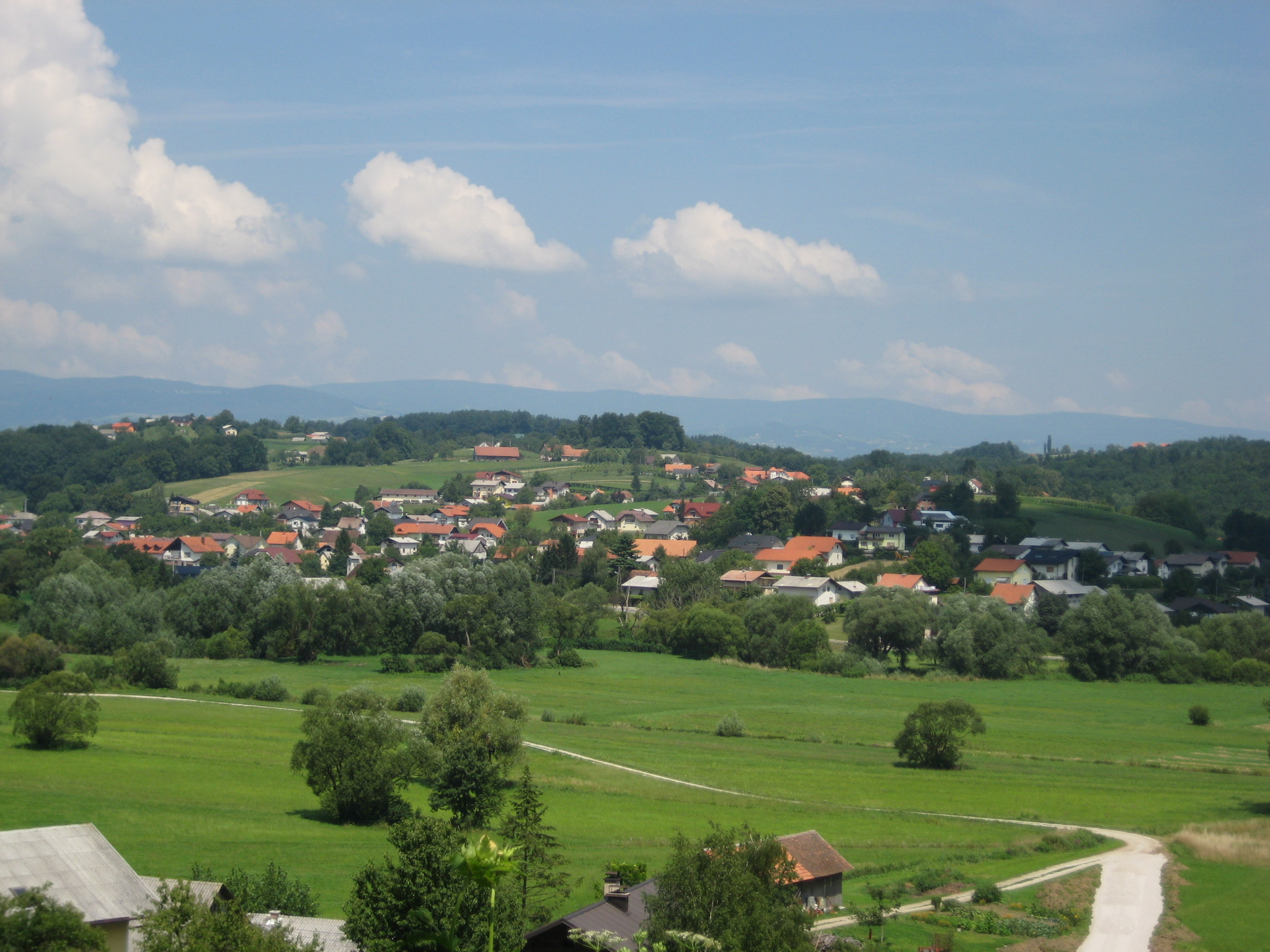

- Location in Slovenia
- Coordinates: 46°18′38.85″N 15°35′6.64″E
- Country: Slovenia
- Traditional region: Styria
- Statistical region: Drava
- Municipality: Poljčane

Area
  - Total: 1.32 km^{2} (0.51 sq mi)
- Elevation: 258.3 m (847 ft)

Population (2002)
  - Total: 577

Spodnje Poljčane (pronounced [ˈspoːdnjɛ pɔlˈtʃaːnɛ]) is a settlement on the left bank of the Dravinja River in the Municipality of Poljčane in northeastern Slovenia. The area is part of the traditional region of Styria. It is now included with the rest of the municipality in the Drava Statistical Region.

A Neo-Gothic chapel with a small belfry was built in the settlement in 1938.
