= Tekačevo =

Tekačevo Spodnje/Zgornje Tekačevo (until 1952)
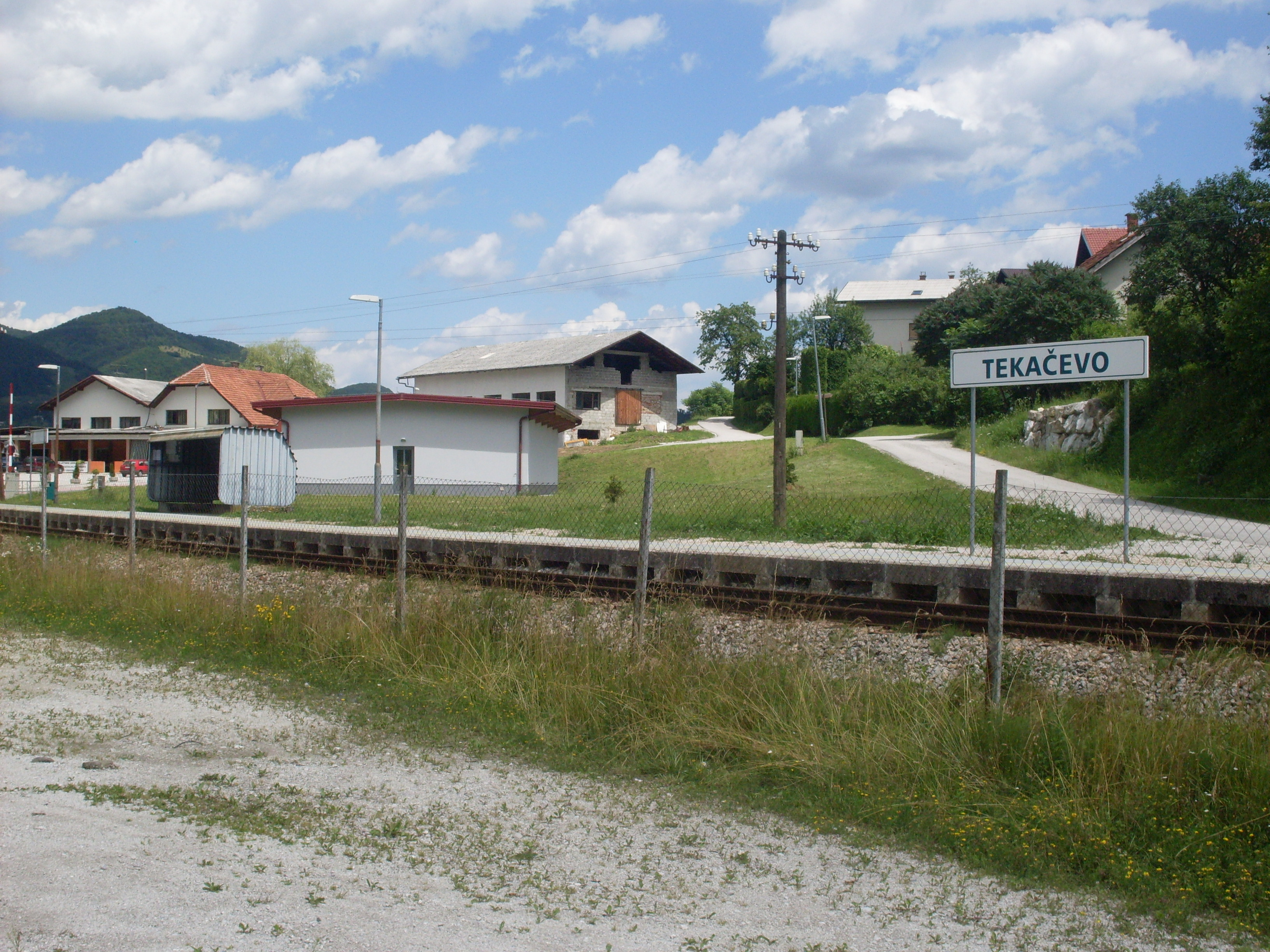
- The rail halt in Tekačevo

- Location in Slovenia
- Coordinates: 46°14′22.37″N 15°37′0.61″E
- Country: Slovenia
- Traditional region: Styria
- Statistical region: Savinja
- Municipality: Rogaška Slatina

Area
  - Total: 1.47 km^{2} (0.57 sq mi)
- Elevation: 268 m (879 ft)

Population (2002)
  - Total: 243

Tekačevo (pronounced [tɛˈkaːtʃɛʋɔ], in older sources Takačevo, German: Takatschevo) is a settlement in the Municipality of Rogaška Slatina in eastern Slovenia. The railway line from Celje to Rogaška Slatina runs through the settlement. The wider area around Rogaška Slatina is part of the traditional region of Styria. It is now included in the Savinja Statistical Region.

== Name ==
The name of the settlement was changed from Spodnje Tekačevo and Zgornje Tekačevo to Tekačevo in 1952.

== Mass murder ==
On 4 March 1997, a never resolved mass murder, considered the worst or one of the worst murders in independent Slovenia, happened in Tekačevo. Four people (a married couple and their tenants) were killed. The only suspect has been Kristijan Kamenik, but his involvement has never been proved.

== Laufendorf ==
It is also the home of the band Laufendorf, with their most popular songs being "Podrtija ob Cesti," "Ka vse," and "Podbočar."
