= Gradiški Dol =

- Location in Slovenia
- Coordinates: 46°14′49.34″N 15°36′44.1″E
- Country: Slovenia
- Traditional region: Styria
- Statistical region: Savinja
- Municipality: Rogaška Slatina

Area
  - Total: 0.49 km^{2} (0.19 sq mi)
- Elevation: 282.3 m (926 ft)

Population (2002)
  - Total: 29

Gradiški Dol (pronounced [ɡɾaˈdiːʃki ˈdoːl]) is a small settlement in the Municipality of Rogaška Slatina in eastern Slovenia. The entire area of Rogaška Slatina belongs to the traditional Styria region and is now included in the Savinja Statistical Region.
