= Modraže =

- Location in Slovenia
- Coordinates: 46°18′40.86″N 15°37′56.8″E
- Country: Slovenia
- Traditional region: Styria
- Statistical region: Drava
- Municipality: Poljčane

Area
  - Total: 1.44 km^{2} (0.56 sq mi)
- Elevation: 252.2 m (827 ft)

Population (2002)
  - Total: 69

Modraže (pronounced [mɔˈdɾaːʒɛ]) is a settlement in the Municipality of Poljčane in northeastern Slovenia. It lies in the hills above the left bank of the Dravinja River, east of the town of Poljčane. The area is part of the traditional region of Styria. It is now included with the rest of the municipality in the Drava Statistical Region.
