= Gabrce =

- Location in Slovenia
- Coordinates: 46°12′37.6″N 15°36′27.7″E
- Country: Slovenia
- Traditional region: Styria
- Statistical region: Savinja
- Municipality: Rogaška Slatina

Area
  - Total: 1.27 km^{2} (0.49 sq mi)
- Elevation: 261.8 m (859 ft)

Population (2002)
  - Total: 54

Gabrce (pronounced [ˈɡaːbəɾtsɛ]) is a small settlement in the Municipality of Rogaška Slatina in eastern Slovenia. The entire area belongs to the traditional Styria region and is now included in the Savinja Statistical Region.
