= Plat, Rogaška Slatina =

Plat
- Location in Slovenia
- Coordinates: 46°13′16.26″N 15°36′5.73″E
- Country: Slovenia
- Traditional region: Styria
- Statistical region: Savinja
- Municipality: Rogaška Slatina

Area
  - Total: 1.27 km^{2} (0.49 sq mi)
- Elevation: 319.5 m (1,048 ft)

Population (2002)
  - Total: 84

Plat (pronounced [ˈplaːt]) is a small settlement in the Municipality of Rogaška Slatina in eastern Slovenia. The area of Rogaška Slatina belongs to the traditional Styria region and is now included in the Savinja Statistical Region.
