= Rjavica =

- Location in Slovenia
- Coordinates: 46°13′26.39″N 15°39′42.85″E
- Country: Slovenia
- Traditional region: Styria
- Statistical region: Savinja
- Municipality: Rogaška Slatina

Area
  - Total: 1.61 km^{2} (0.62 sq mi)
- Elevation: 222.6 m (730 ft)

Population (2002)
  - Total: 156

Rjavica (pronounced [ˈɾjaːʋitsa]) is a settlement on the right bank of the Sotla River in the Municipality of Rogaška Slatina in eastern Slovenia. The entire Rogaška Slatina area is part of the traditional region of Styria. It is now included in the Savinja Statistical Region.
