= Kačji Dol =

- Location in Slovenia
- Coordinates: 46°14′9″N 15°35′13.56″E
- Country: Slovenia
- Traditional region: Styria
- Statistical region: Savinja
- Municipality: Rogaška Slatina

Area
  - Total: 1.64 km^{2} (0.63 sq mi)
- Elevation: 346.3 m (1,136 ft)

Population (2002)
  - Total: 167

Kačji Dol (pronounced [ˈkaːtʃji ˈdoːl]) is a settlement in the Municipality of Rogaška Slatina in eastern Slovenia. The area belongs to the traditional region of Styria. It is now included in the Savinja Statistical Region.
