= Čadramska Vas =

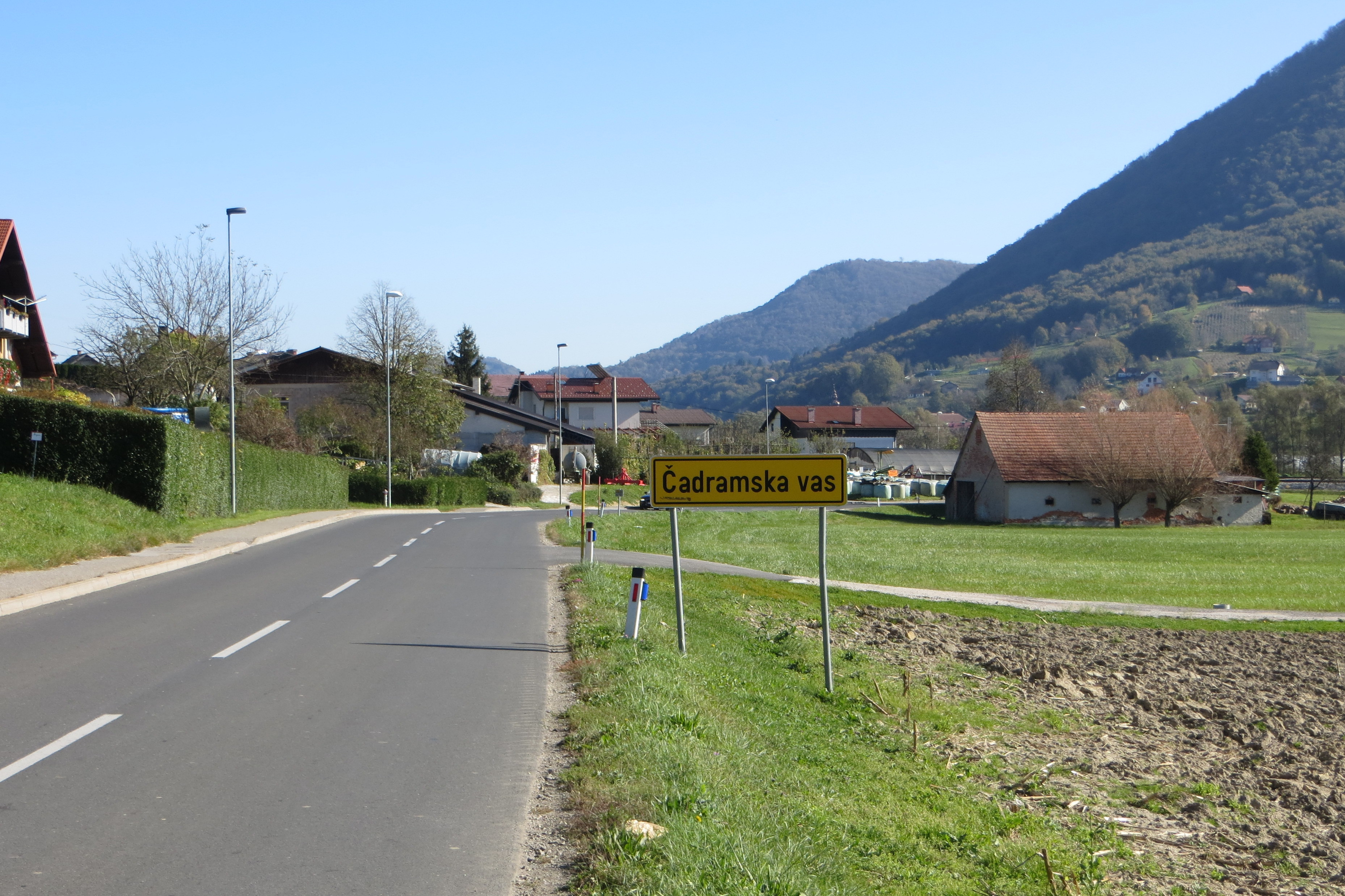

- Location in Slovenia
- Coordinates: 46°18′26.81″N 15°34′14.63″E
- Country: Slovenia
- Traditional region: Styria
- Statistical region: Drava
- Municipality: Poljčane

Area
  - Total: 0.67 km^{2} (0.26 sq mi)
- Elevation: 276.8 m (908 ft)

Population (2002)
  - Total: 141

Čadramska Vas (pronounced [ˈtʃaːdɾamska ˈʋaːs]; Slovene: Čadramska vas) is a village in the Municipality of Poljčane in northeastern Slovenia. It lies on the left bank of the Dravinja River, just west of the town of Poljčane. The main railway line from Ljubljana to Maribor runs through the settlement. The area is part of the traditional region of Styria. It is now included with the rest of the municipality in the Drava Statistical Region.
