= Podplat =

- Location in Slovenia
- Coordinates: 46°14′41.29″N 15°34′30.96″E
- Country: Slovenia
- Traditional region: Styria
- Statistical region: Savinja
- Municipality: Rogaška Slatina

Area
  - Total: 0.97 km^{2} (0.37 sq mi)
- Elevation: 229.3 m (752 ft)

Population (2002)
  - Total: 107

Podplat (pronounced [ˈpɔːtplat]) is a small settlement in the Municipality of Rogaška Slatina in eastern Slovenia. It lies on the railway line from Celje to Rogaška Slatina and there is a small train station in the settlement. The entire area belongs to the traditional Styria region and is now included in the Savinja Statistical Region.
