= Hrastovec pod Bočem =

Hrastovec pod Bočem Hrastovec (until 1998)
- Location in Slovenia
- Coordinates: 46°17′44.32″N 15°39′9.09″E
- Country: Slovenia
- Traditional region: Styria
- Statistical region: Drava
- Municipality: Poljčane

Area
  - Total: 5.96 km^{2} (2.30 sq mi)
- Elevation: 415.4 m (1,363 ft)

Population (2002)
  - Total: 97

Hrastovec pod Bočem (pronounced [ˈxɾaːstɔʋəts pɔd ˈboːtʃɛm]) is a settlement in the Municipality of Poljčane in northeastern Slovenia. It lies in the foothills of Mount Boč above the right bank of the Dravinja River. The area is part of the traditional region of Styria. It is now included with the rest of the municipality in the Drava Statistical Region.

== Name ==
The settlement was formerly simply named Hrastovec but it was renamed Hrastovec pod Bočem in 1998.

== Cultural heritage ==
A small chapel in the settlement is dedicated to Saint Barbara, patron saint of miners, and was built in 1813 near the Kleče Mine.
