= Križeča Vas =

- Location in Slovenia
- Coordinates: 46°18′40.98″N 15°36′34.54″E
- Country: Slovenia
- Traditional region: Styria
- Statistical region: Drava
- Municipality: Poljčane

Area
  - Total: 1.15 km^{2} (0.44 sq mi)
- Elevation: 295 m (968 ft)

Population (2002)
  - Total: 88

Križeča Vas (pronounced [ˈkɾiːʒɛtʃa ˈʋaːs]; Slovene: Križeča vas) is a settlement in the Municipality of Poljčane in northeastern Slovenia. The area is part of the traditional region of Styria. It is now included with the rest of the municipality in the Drava Statistical Region.
