= Ratanska Vas =

- Location in Slovenia
- Coordinates: 46°15′2.29″N 15°37′44.94″E
- Country: Slovenia
- Traditional region: Styria
- Statistical region: Savinja
- Municipality: Rogaška Slatina

Area
  - Total: 0.41 km^{2} (0.16 sq mi)
- Elevation: 284.8 m (934 ft)

Population (2002)
  - Total: 114

Ratanska Vas (pronounced [ˈɾaːtanska ˈʋaːs]; Slovene: Ratanska vas) is a settlement immediately north of Rogaška Slatina in eastern Slovenia. The entire area of Rogaška Slatina is part of the traditional region of Styria. It is now included in the Savinja Statistical Region.
