= Male Rodne =

Male Rodne Sveti Mohor (until 1953)
- Location in Slovenia
- Coordinates: 46°13′54.49″N 15°36′3.35″E
- Country: Slovenia
- Traditional region: Styria
- Statistical region: Savinja
- Municipality: Rogaška Slatina

Area
  - Total: 1.46 km^{2} (0.56 sq mi)
- Elevation: 326 m (1,070 ft)

Population (2002)
  - Total: 118

Male Rodne (pronounced [ˈmaːlɛ ˈɾoːdnɛ]) is a settlement in the Municipality of Rogaška Slatina in eastern Slovenia. The entire area belongs to the traditional Styria region and is now included in the Savinja Statistical Region.

== Name ==
The name of the settlement was changed from Sveti Mohor (literally, 'Saint Hermagoras') to Male Rodne (literally, 'little Rodne') in 1953. The name was changed on the basis of the 1948 Law on Names of Settlements and Designations of Squares, Streets, and Buildings as part of efforts by Slovenia's postwar communist government to remove religious elements from toponyms. The name Male Rodne ('little Rodne') distinguishes the settlement from nearby Velike Rodne ('big Rodne'). The plural name Rodne and names like it (e.g., Rodine) are derived from the common noun *rodina 'untilled land', thus referring to a local geographical feature.

== Church ==
The local church is dedicated to Saints Hermagoras and Fortunatus and belongs to the Parish of Rogaška Slatina. The Late Gothic sanctuary dates to 1536 and has a painted stellar vaulted ceiling. The nave dates to the 17th century and a southern chapel was added in 1740.
