= Brestovec, Rogaška Slatina =

Brestovec
- Location in Slovenia
- Coordinates: 46°13′2.1″N 15°37′47.77″E
- Country: Slovenia
- Traditional region: Styria
- Statistical region: Savinja
- Municipality: Rogaška Slatina

Area
  - Total: 1.2 km^{2} (0.46 sq mi)
- Elevation: 298.7 m (980 ft)

Population (2002)
  - Total: 152

Brestovec (pronounced [bɾɛˈstɔːʋəts] or [bɾɛˈstoːʋəts]) is a small settlement in the Municipality of Rogaška Slatina in eastern Slovenia. The area belongs to the traditional Styria region and is now included in the Savinja Statistical Region.
