= Zgornje Sečovo =

- Location in Slovenia
- Coordinates: 46°15′24.6″N 15°39′46.61″E
- Country: Slovenia
- Traditional region: Styria
- Statistical region: Savinja
- Municipality: Rogaška Slatina

Area
  - Total: 1.72 km^{2} (0.66 sq mi)
- Elevation: 298.9 m (981 ft)

Population (2002)
  - Total: 103

Zgornje Sečovo (pronounced [ˈzɡoːɾnjɛ sɛˈtʃɔːʋɔ] or [ˈzɡoːɾnjɛ sɛˈtʃoːʋɔ]) is a settlement in the Municipality of Rogaška Slatina in eastern Slovenia. The wider area around Rogaška Slatina is part of the traditional region of Styria. It is now included in the Savinja Statistical Region.
