= Spodnja Kostrivnica =

- Location in Slovenia
- Coordinates: 46°15′2.22″N 15°34′55.46″E
- Country: Slovenia
- Traditional region: Styria
- Statistical region: Savinja
- Municipality: Rogaška Slatina

Area
  - Total: 1.54 km^{2} (0.59 sq mi)
- Elevation: 239.8 m (787 ft)

Population (2002)
  - Total: 120

Spodnja Kostrivnica (pronounced [ˈspoːdnja kɔˈstɾiːu̯nitsa], German: Unterkostreinitz) is a settlement in the Municipality of Rogaška Slatina in eastern Slovenia. The entire Rogaška Slatina area is part of the traditional region of Styria. It is now included in the Savinja Statistical Region.
