= Ceste =

- Location in Slovenia
- Coordinates: 46°13′20.51″N 15°36′58.98″E
- Country: Slovenia
- Traditional region: Styria
- Statistical region: Savinja
- Municipality: Rogaška Slatina

Area
  - Total: 1.45 km^{2} (0.56 sq mi)
- Elevation: 286.4 m (940 ft)

Population (2002)
  - Total: 123

Ceste (pronounced [ˈtseːstɛ]) is a small settlement in the Municipality of Rogaška Slatina in eastern Slovenia, close to the border with Croatia. The entire Rogaška Slatina area belongs to the traditional Styria region and is now included in the Savinja Statistical Region.
