= Sveti Florijan =

Sveti Florijan Stojno selo (1948–1993)
- Village
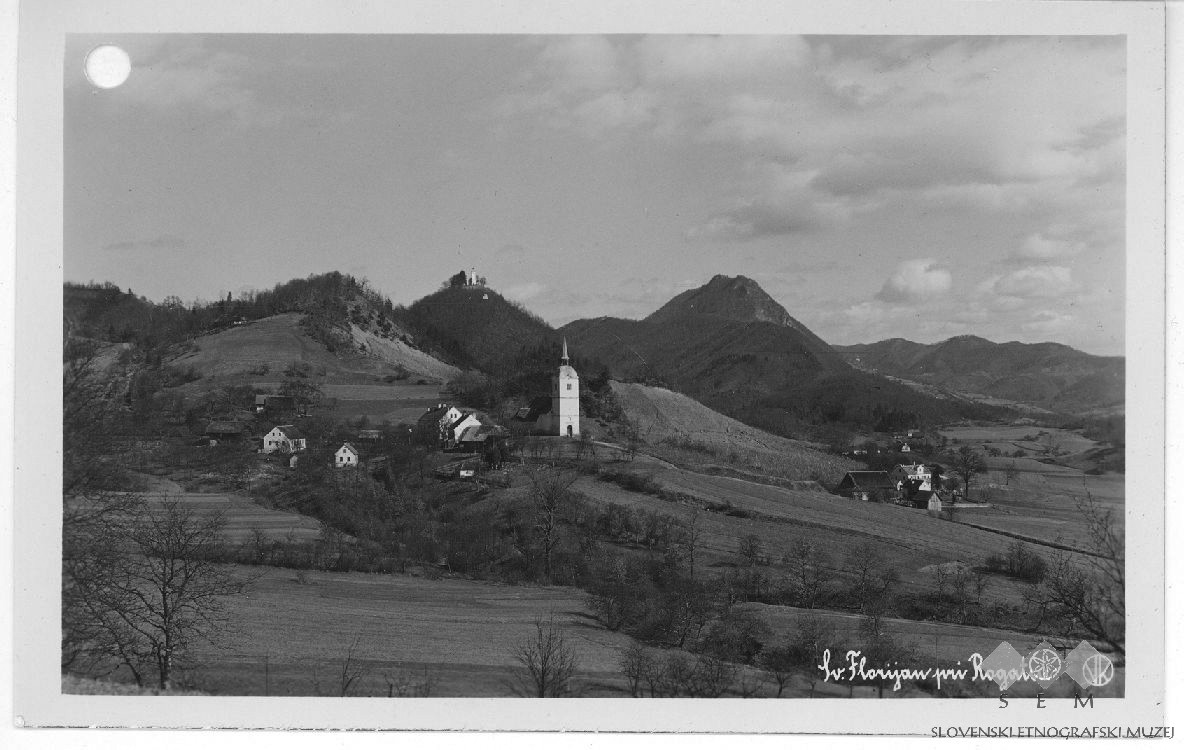
- Postcard of Sveti Florijan

- Location in Slovenia
- Coordinates: 46°15′39.87″N 15°40′33.02″E
- Country: Slovenia
- Traditional region: Styria
- Statistical region: Savinja
- Municipality: Rogaška Slatina

Area
  - Total: 5.35 km^{2} (2.07 sq mi)
- Elevation: 316.1 m (1,037 ft)

Population (2002)
  - Total: 359

Sveti Florijan (Slovene pronunciation: [ˈsʋeːti flɔɾiˈjan]) is a settlement in the Municipality of Rogaška Slatina in eastern Slovenia. The wider area around Rogaška Slatina is part of the traditional region of Styria. It is now included in the Savinja Statistical Region.

== Name ==
The name of the settlement was changed from Sveti Florijan pri Rogatcu (literally, 'Saint Florian near Rogatec') to Stojno Selo (Slovene: Stojno selo) in 1948. The name was changed on the basis of the 1948 Law on Names of Settlements and Designations of Squares, Streets, and Buildings as part of efforts by Slovenia's postwar communist government to remove religious elements from toponyms. The name Sveti Florijan was restored in 1993.

== Church ==
The parish church, from which the settlement gets its name, is dedicated to Saint Florian. It was built in 1658 and is known as the Parish of Sveti Florijan ob Boču, referring to its proximity to Mount Boč northwest of the settlement.
