= Kamence, Rogaška Slatina =

Kamence Sveta Katarina (until 1953)
- Location in Slovenia
- Coordinates: 46°12′18.49″N 15°37′27.21″E
- Country: Slovenia
- Traditional region: Styria
- Statistical region: Savinja
- Municipality: Rogaška Slatina

Area
  - Total: 1.54 km^{2} (0.59 sq mi)
- Elevation: 309.1 m (1,014 ft)

Population (2002)
  - Total: 99

Kamence (pronounced [ˈkaːməntsɛ] or [ˈkaːmɛntsɛ]) is a settlement in the Municipality of Rogaška Slatina in eastern Slovenia, close to the border with Croatia. The area belongs to the traditional region of Styria. It is now included in the Savinja Statistical Region.

== Name ==
The name of the settlement was changed from Sveta Katarina (literally, 'Saint Catherine') to Kamence (literally, 'small stones') in 1953. The name was changed on the basis of the 1948 Law on Names of Settlements and Designations of Squares, Streets, and Buildings as part of efforts by Slovenia's postwar communist government to remove religious elements from toponyms.
