= Krasna, Poljčane =

Krasna
- Location in Slovenia
- Coordinates: 46°18′20.86″N 15°37′42.08″E
- Country: Slovenia
- Traditional region: Styria
- Statistical region: Drava
- Municipality: Poljčane

Area
  - Total: 0.46 km^{2} (0.18 sq mi)
- Elevation: 254.6 m (835 ft)

Population (2002)
  - Total: 56

Krasna (pronounced [ˈkɾaːsna]) is a small village on the right bank of the Dravinja River in the Municipality of Poljčane in northeastern Slovenia. The area is part of the traditional region of Styria. It is now included with the rest of the municipality in the Drava Statistical Region.
