= Spodnje Negonje =

- Location in Slovenia
- Coordinates: 46°15′5.03″N 15°37′17.9″E
- Country: Slovenia
- Traditional region: Styria
- Statistical region: Savinja
- Municipality: Rogaška Slatina

Area
  - Total: 0.75 km^{2} (0.29 sq mi)
- Elevation: 267.7 m (878 ft)

Population (2002)
  - Total: 308

Spodnje Negonje (pronounced [ˈspoːdnjɛ nɛˈɡoːnjɛ]) is a settlement in the Municipality of Rogaška Slatina in eastern Slovenia. It lies just north of the town of Rogaška Slatina. The entire area is part of the traditional region of Styria. It is now included in the Savinja Statistical Region.

== Name ==
The name Spodnje Negonje means 'lower Negonje', distinguishing the village from neighboring Zgornje Negonje (literally, 'upper Negonje'), which lies at an elevation about 210 meters (690 ft) higher. The name Negonje is probably a possessive form of the personal name *Negojinъ, elided from *Negojin'e (selo) 'Negojinъ's (village)', referring to an early inhabitant of the place.
