= Zgornji Gabernik =

Place in Styria, Slovenia

Zgornji Gabernik Zgornji Gabrnik (until 2002)
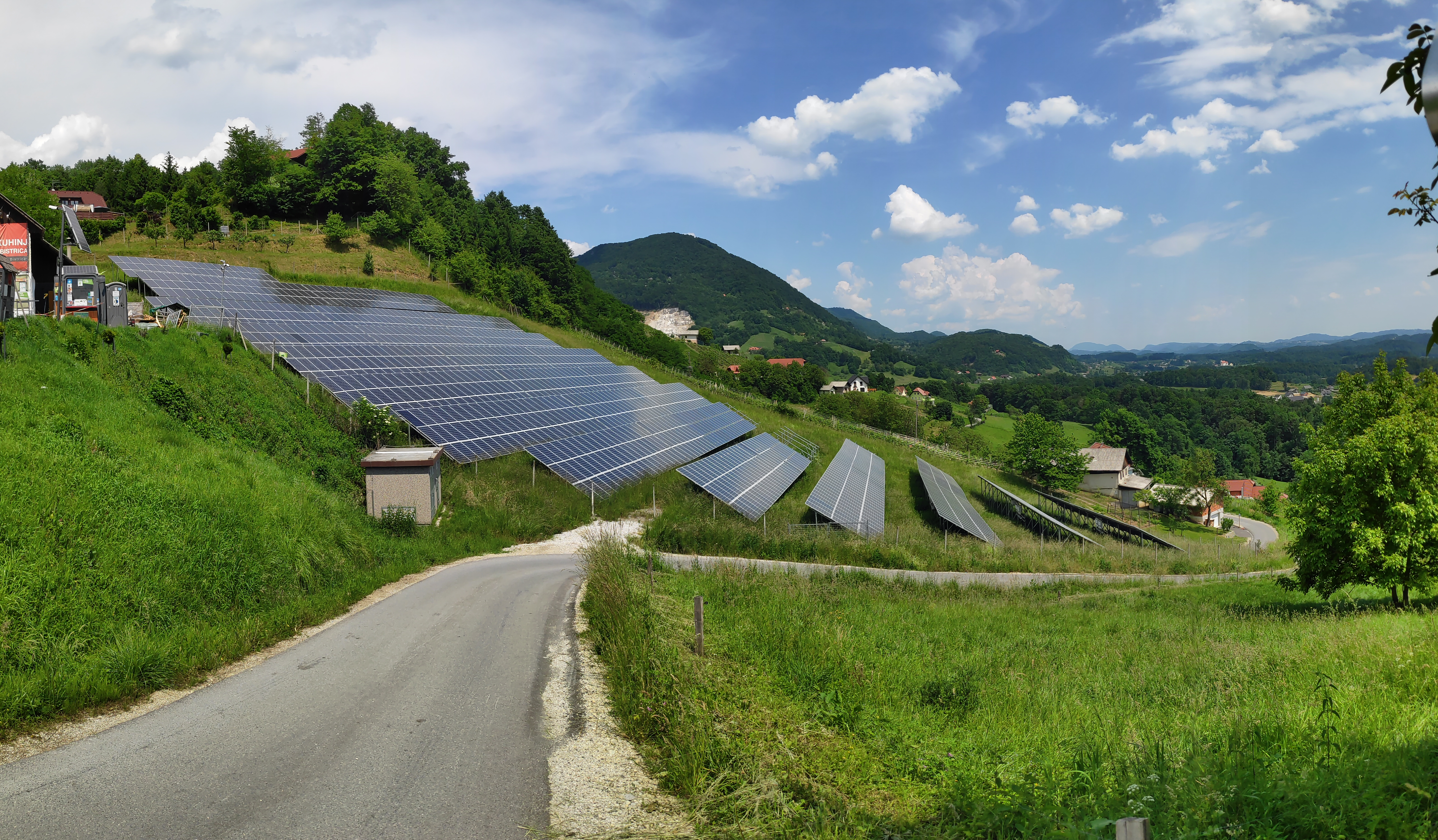

- Location in Slovenia
- Coordinates: 46°16′24″N 15°34′23.63″E
- Country: Slovenia
- Traditional region: Styria
- Statistical region: Savinja
- Municipality: Rogaška Slatina

Area
  - Total: 3.03 km^{2} (1.17 sq mi)
- Elevation: 298.6 m (980 ft)

Population (2002)
  - Total: 134

Zgornji Gabernik (pronounced [ˈzɡoːɾnji ˈɡaːbəɾnik]) is a settlement in the Municipality of Rogaška Slatina in eastern Slovenia. It lies at the southwestern foothills of Mount Boč. The wider area around Rogaška Slatina is part of the traditional region of Styria. It is now included in the Savinja Statistical Region.

== Name ==
The name of the village was changed from Zgornji Gabrnik to Zgornji Gabernik in 2002.
