= Podturn, Rogaška Slatina =

Podturn
- Location in Slovenia
- Coordinates: 46°15′51.83″N 15°34′43.84″E
- Country: Slovenia
- Traditional region: Styria
- Statistical region: Savinja
- Municipality: Rogaška Slatina

Area
  - Total: 0.92 km^{2} (0.36 sq mi)
- Elevation: 271.3 m (890 ft)

Population (2002)
  - Total: 71

Podturn (pronounced [pɔˈtuːɾn]) is a small settlement in the Municipality of Rogaška Slatina in eastern Slovenia. The area belongs to the traditional Styria region and is now included in the Savinja Statistical Region.
