= Novake, Poljčane =

Novake
- Location in Slovenia
- Coordinates: 46°18′28.09″N 15°37′22.07″E
- Country: Slovenia
- Traditional region: Styria
- Statistical region: Drava
- Municipality: Poljčane

Area
  - Total: 0.91 km^{2} (0.35 sq mi)
- Elevation: 259.2 m (850 ft)

Population (2002)
  - Total: 179

Novake (pronounced [nɔˈʋaːkɛ]) is a village on the left bank of the Dravinja River in the Municipality of Poljčane in northeastern Slovenia. The area belongs to the traditional region of Styria. It is now included with the rest of the municipality in the Drava Statistical Region.
