= Brezje, Cerknica =

Brezje
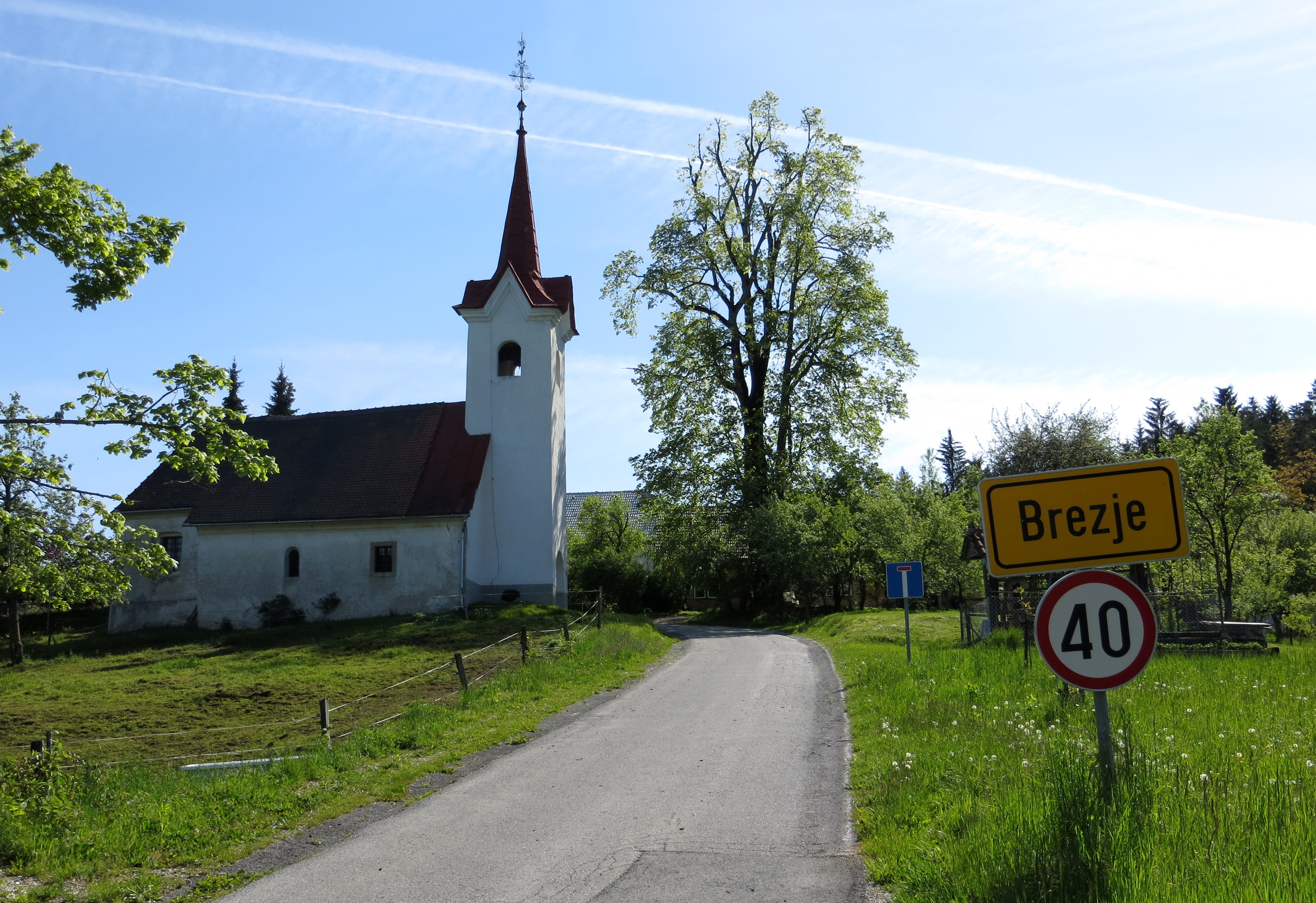

- Location in Slovenia
- Coordinates: 45°48′33.46″N 14°22′57.99″E
- Country: Slovenia
- Traditional region: Inner Carniola
- Statistical region: Littoral–Inner Carniola
- Municipality: Cerknica

Area
  - Total: 1.39 km^{2} (0.54 sq mi)
- Elevation: 628.6 m (2,062 ft)

Population (2020)
  - Total: 29
  - Density: 21/km^{2} (54/sq mi)

Brezje (pronounced [ˈbɾeːzjɛ]) is a small village south of Begunje in the Municipality of Cerknica in the Inner Carniola region of Slovenia.

== Name ==
Brezje was attested in written sources as Vrersa in 1275, Bresiach in 1422, Pirk in 1438, and Bresie in 1498, among other spellings. The name Brezje literally means 'birch woods', derived from the common noun breza 'birch'. Like similar toponyms in Slovenia (e.g., Brezova, Brezovec, Brezovci), it originally referred to the local vegetation.

== History ==
A water main was installed in Brezje in 1911; prior to this, the villagers would drive their animals to Cerkniščica Creek northwest of the settlement to water them and would also transport water from the creek for household use. A sawmill jointly owned by several farmers operated on Cerkniščica Creek until 1950.

=== Mass grave ===
Brezje is the site of a mass grave associated with the Second World War. The Kovač Shaft Mass Grave (Slovene: Grobišče Kovačevo brezno or Grobišče Kovačev brezen) is located southeast of Brezje, on the northwest slope of Big Mount Slivnica (Velika Slivnica, 1,114 m). The cave entrance is at the bottom of an 18 m deep sinkhole. The bones of an unknown number of victims and a grenade were found in the shaft.

== Church ==
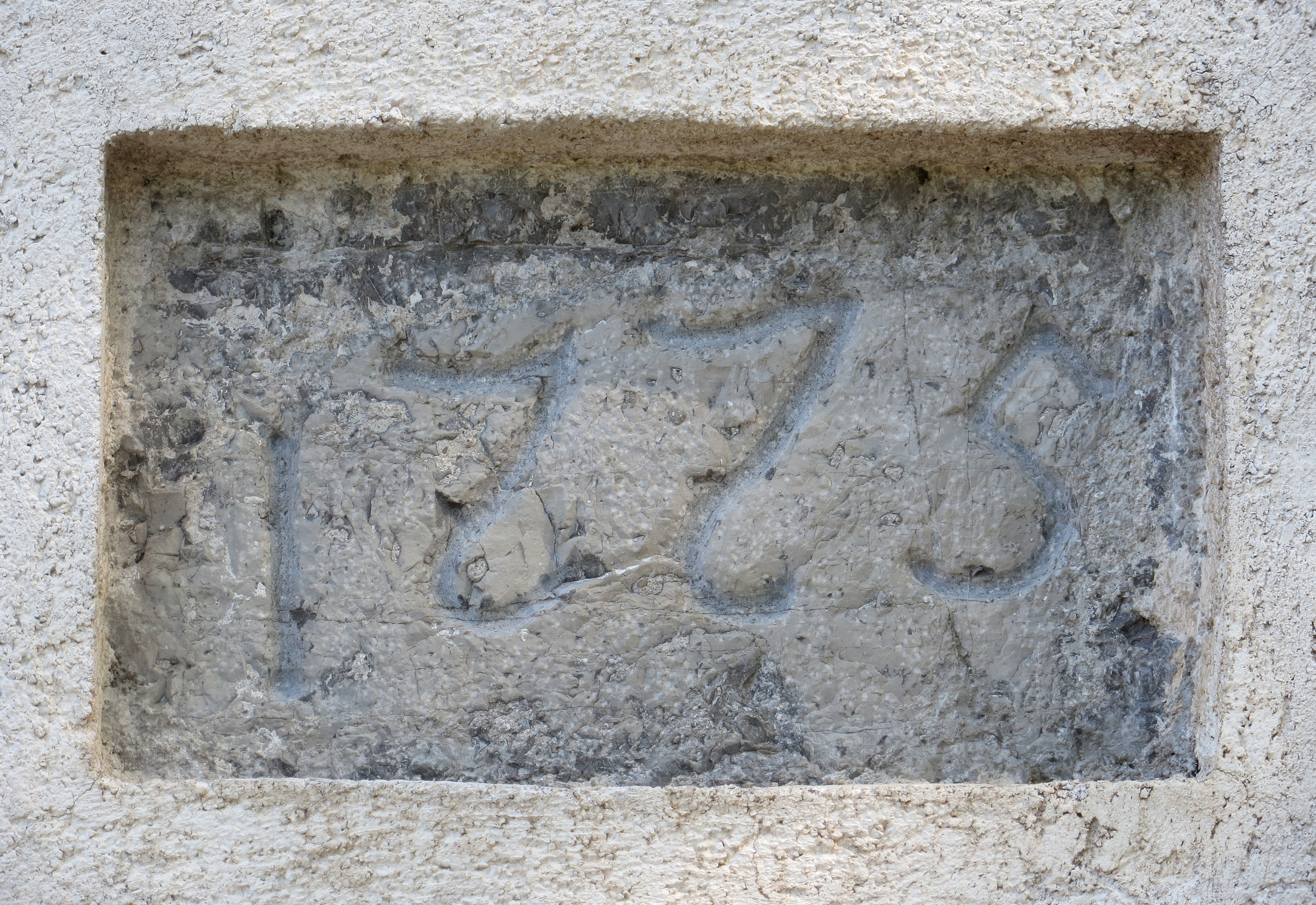
Church cornerstone, dated 1775

The local church in the settlement is dedicated to Saint George and belongs to the Parish of Cerknica. It dates from 1775.
