= Prnek =

- Location in Slovenia
- Coordinates: 46°13′28″N 15°37′50.86″E
- Country: Slovenia
- Traditional region: Styria
- Statistical region: Savinja
- Municipality: Rogaška Slatina

Area
  - Total: 0.43 km^{2} (0.17 sq mi)
- Elevation: 350.5 m (1,150 ft)

Population (2002)
  - Total: 96

Prnek (pronounced [pəɾˈneːk]) is a settlement in the Municipality of Rogaška Slatina in eastern Slovenia. The area belongs to the traditional Styria region and is now included in the Savinja Statistical Region.
