= Nimno =

- Location in Slovenia
- Coordinates: 46°11′21.17″N 15°38′23.92″E
- Country: Slovenia
- Traditional region: Styria
- Statistical region: Savinja
- Municipality: Rogaška Slatina

Area
  - Total: 1.2 km^{2} (0.46 sq mi)
- Elevation: 261 m (856 ft)

Population (2002)
  - Total: 77

Nimno (pronounced [ˈniːmnɔ]) is a small settlement in the Municipality of Rogaška Slatina in eastern Slovenia, right on the border with Croatia. The entire area belongs to the traditional Styria region and is now included in the Savinja Statistical Region.
