= Brezje (Goražde) =

- Village
- Location within Bosnia and Herzegovina
- Coordinates: 43°38′54″N 18°56′47″E
- Country: Bosnia and Herzegovina
- Entity: Federation of Bosnia and Herzegovina
- Canton: Bosnian-Podrinje Goražde
- Municipality: Goražde

Area
  - Total: 0.40 sq mi (1.04 km^{2})
- Elevation: 2,411 ft (735 m)

Population (2013)
  - Total: 9
  - Density: 22/sq mi (8.7/km^{2})
- Time zone: UTC+1 (CET)
  - Summer (DST): UTC+2 (CEST)

Brezje is a village in the municipality of Goražde, Bosnia and Herzegovina.

== Demographics ==
According to the 2013 census, its population was 9.

Ethnicity in 2013
Ethnicity	Number	Percentage
Bosniaks	7	77.8%
Serbs	2	22.2%
Total	9	100%
