= Pristavica, Rogaška Slatina =

Pristavica
- Location in Slovenia
- Coordinates: 46°12′14.57″N 15°38′31.54″E
- Country: Slovenia
- Traditional region: Styria
- Statistical region: Savinja
- Municipality: Rogaška Slatina

Area
  - Total: 0.78 km^{2} (0.30 sq mi)
- Elevation: 242.6 m (796 ft)

Population (2002)
  - Total: 65

Pristavica (pronounced [ˈpɾiːstaʋitsa]) is a small settlement in the Municipality of Rogaška Slatina in eastern Slovenia. It lies on the right bank of the Sotla River, on the border with Croatia. The area belongs to the traditional Styria region and is now included in the Savinja Statistical Region.
