= Brezje pri Bojsnem =

- Location in Slovenia
- Coordinates: 45°58′29.15″N 15°39′43.72″E
- Country: Slovenia
- Traditional region: Styria
- Statistical region: Lower Sava
- Municipality: Brežice

Area
  - Total: 1.65 km^{2} (0.64 sq mi)
- Elevation: 254.7 m (836 ft)

Population (2020)
  - Total: 59
  - Density: 36/km^{2} (93/sq mi)

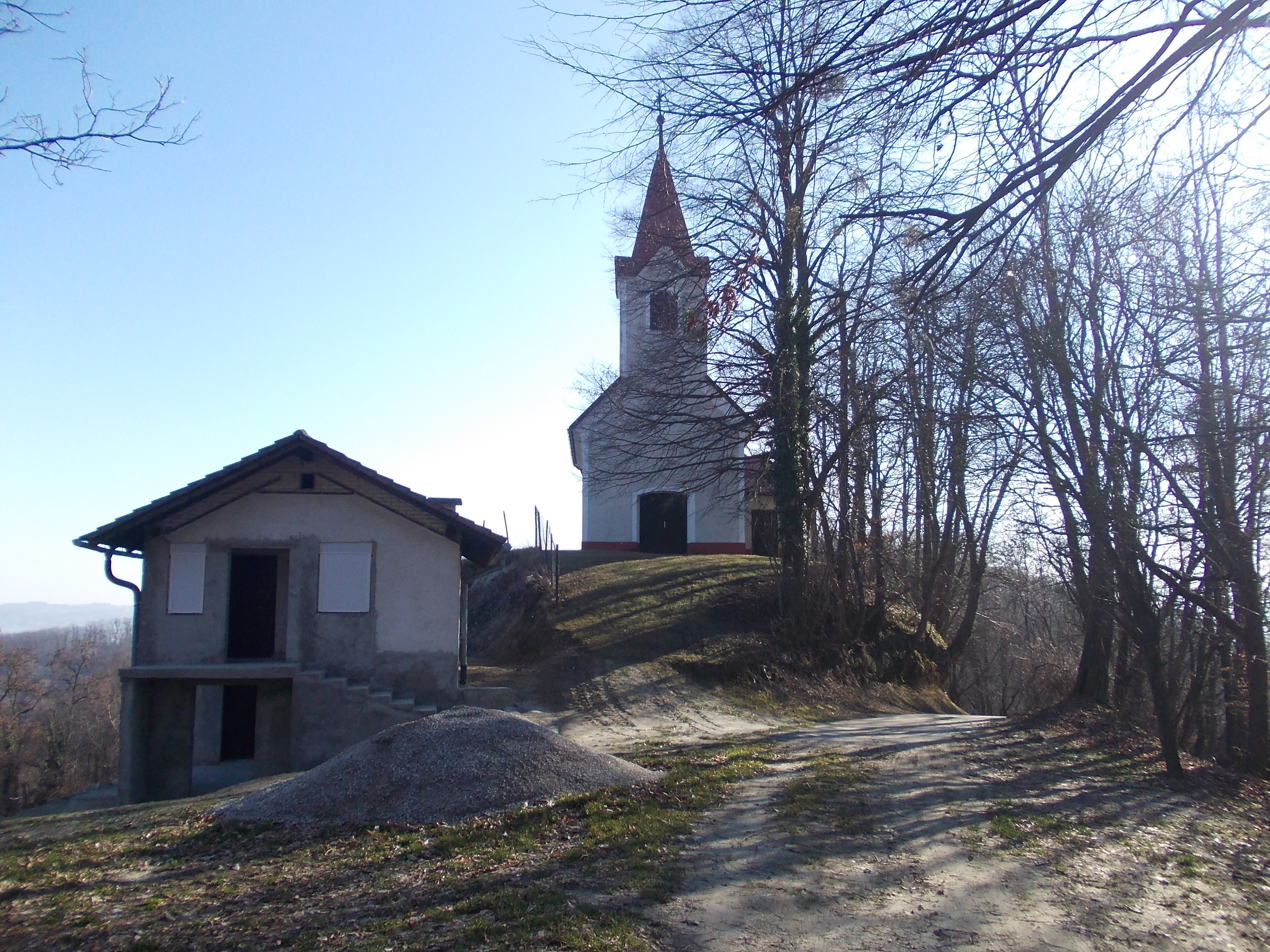
St. Ulrich's Church in Brezje pri Bojsnem, c 2013

Brezje pri Bojsnem (pronounced [ˈbɾeːzjɛ pɾi ˈboːi̯snɛm]; German: Bresje) is a small settlement to the north of Bojsno in the Municipality of Brežice in eastern Slovenia. The area is part of the traditional region of Styria. It is now included in the Lower Sava Statistical Region.

== Name ==
The name of the settlement was changed from Brezje to Brezje pri Bojsnem in 1953. In the past the German name was Bresje.

== Church ==
The local church is dedicated to Saint Ulrich (Slovene: sveti Urh) and belongs to the Parish of Pišece. It is a small church with a rectangular floor plan, a semi-circular apse, and a belfry over its main entrance. It was built in the 19th century.
