= Spodnja Brežnica =

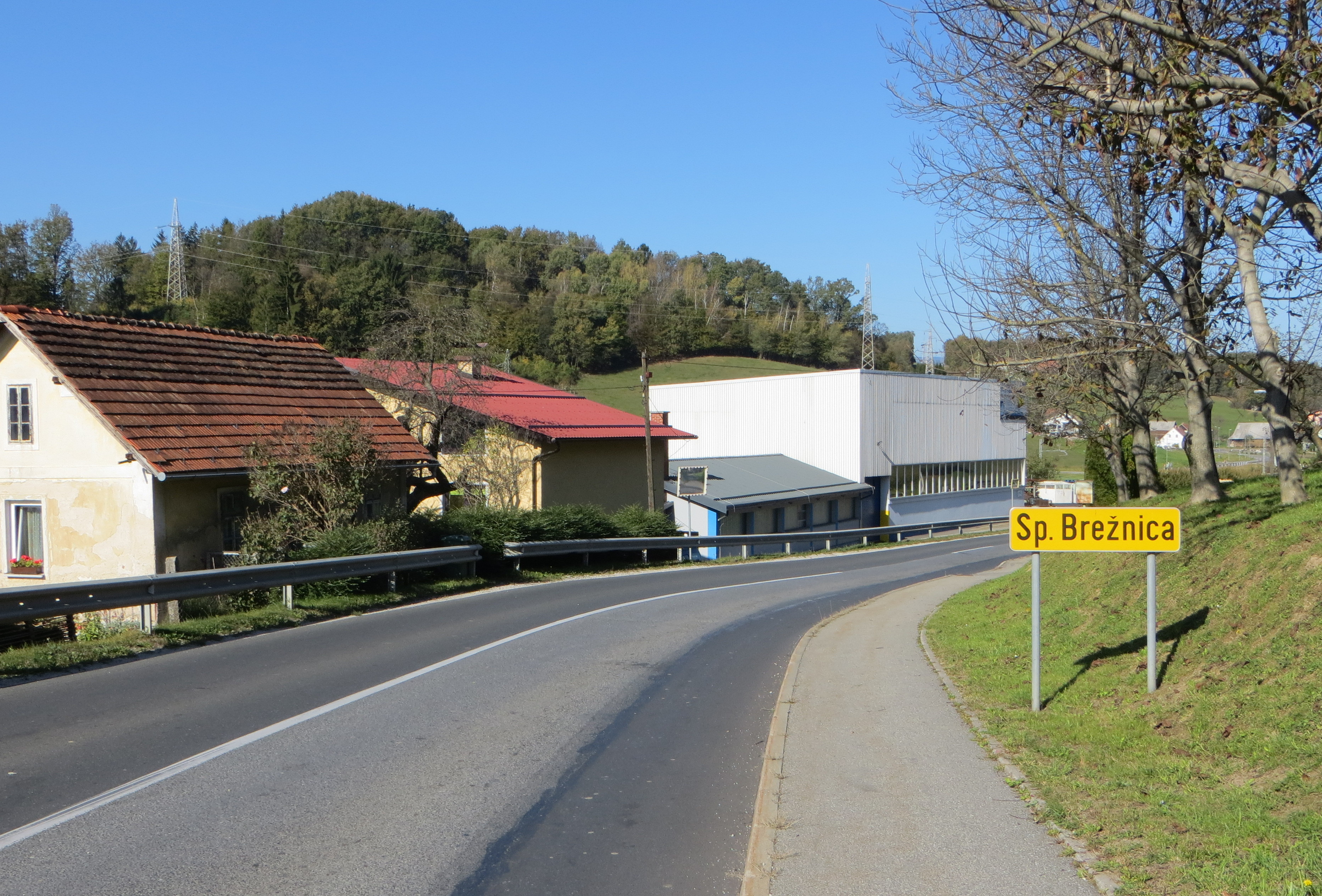

- Location in Slovenia
- Coordinates: 46°19′32.64″N 15°33′59.42″E
- Country: Slovenia
- Traditional region: Styria
- Statistical region: Drava
- Municipality: Poljčane

Area
  - Total: 1.57 km^{2} (0.61 sq mi)
- Elevation: 322.8 m (1,059 ft)

Population (2002)
  - Total: 254

Spodnja Brežnica (pronounced [ˈspoːdnja bɾɛˈʒniːtsa]) is a settlement in the Municipality of Poljčane in northeastern Slovenia. It lies north of Poljčane on the regional road to Slovenska Bistrica. The railway line from Ljubljana to Maribor runs through the settlement. The area is part of the traditional region of Styria. It is now included with the rest of the municipality in the Drava Statistical Region.

Population
Year	Population
2002	254
2011	238
2021	239
2022	232 (estimated)
