= Brezje, Čelić =

Brezje
- Village
- Location within Bosnia and Herzegovina
- Coordinates: 44.679932°N 18.6731405°E
- Country: Bosnia and Herzegovina
- Entity: Federation of Bosnia and Herzegovina
- Canton: Tuzla
- Municipality: Čelić

Area
  - Total: 2.38 sq mi (6.17 km^{2})

Population (2013)
  - Total: 20
  - Density: 8.4/sq mi (3.2/km^{2})
- Time zone: UTC+1 (CET)
  - Summer (DST): UTC+2 (CEST)

Brezje is a village in the municipality of Čelić, Bosnia and Herzegovina.

== Demographics ==
According to the 2013 census, its population was 20, all Serbs.
