= Municipality of Rogaška Slatina =

Municipality of Slovenia

Municipality of Rogaška Slatina Občina Rogaška Slatina
- Municipality
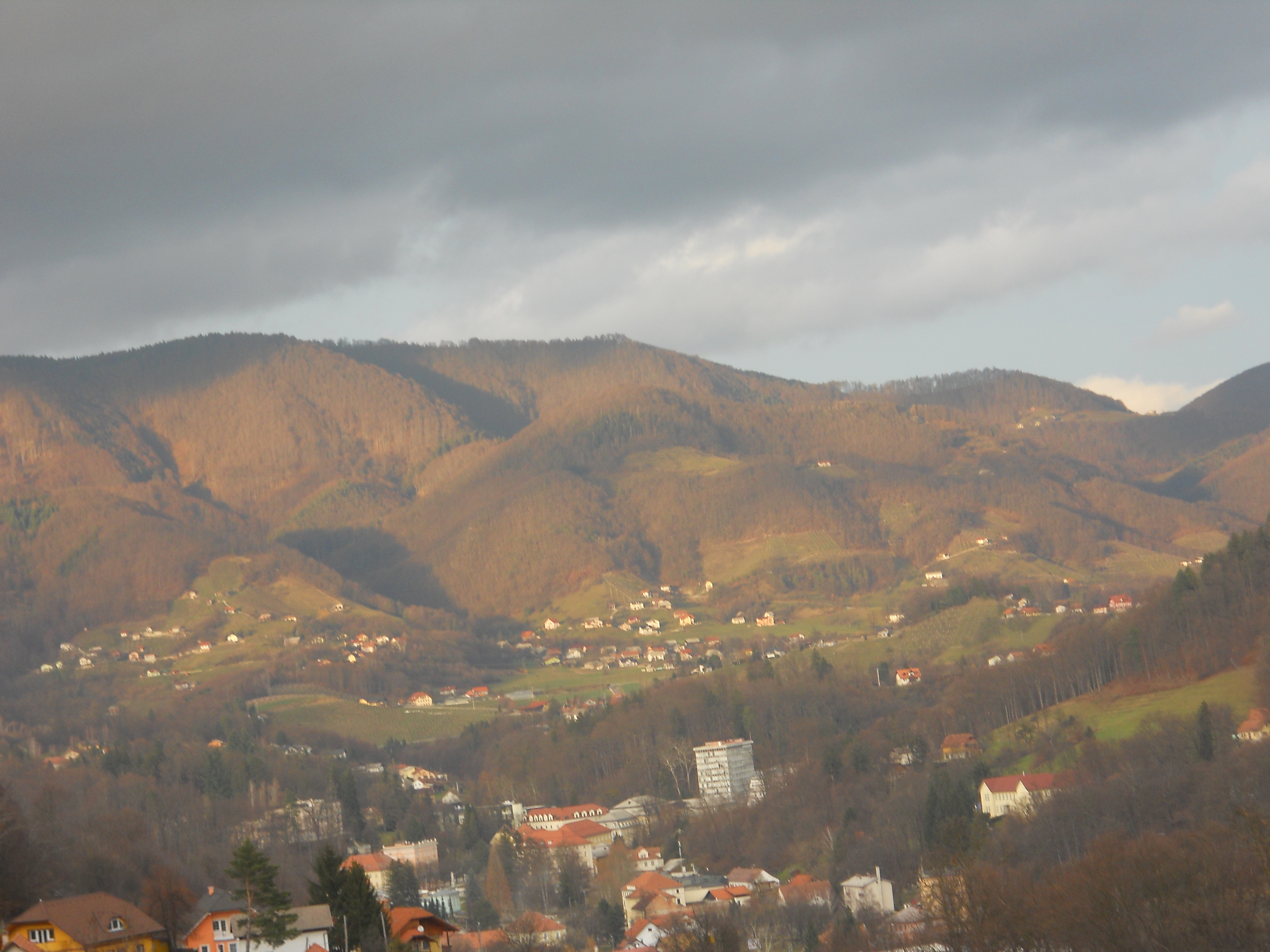

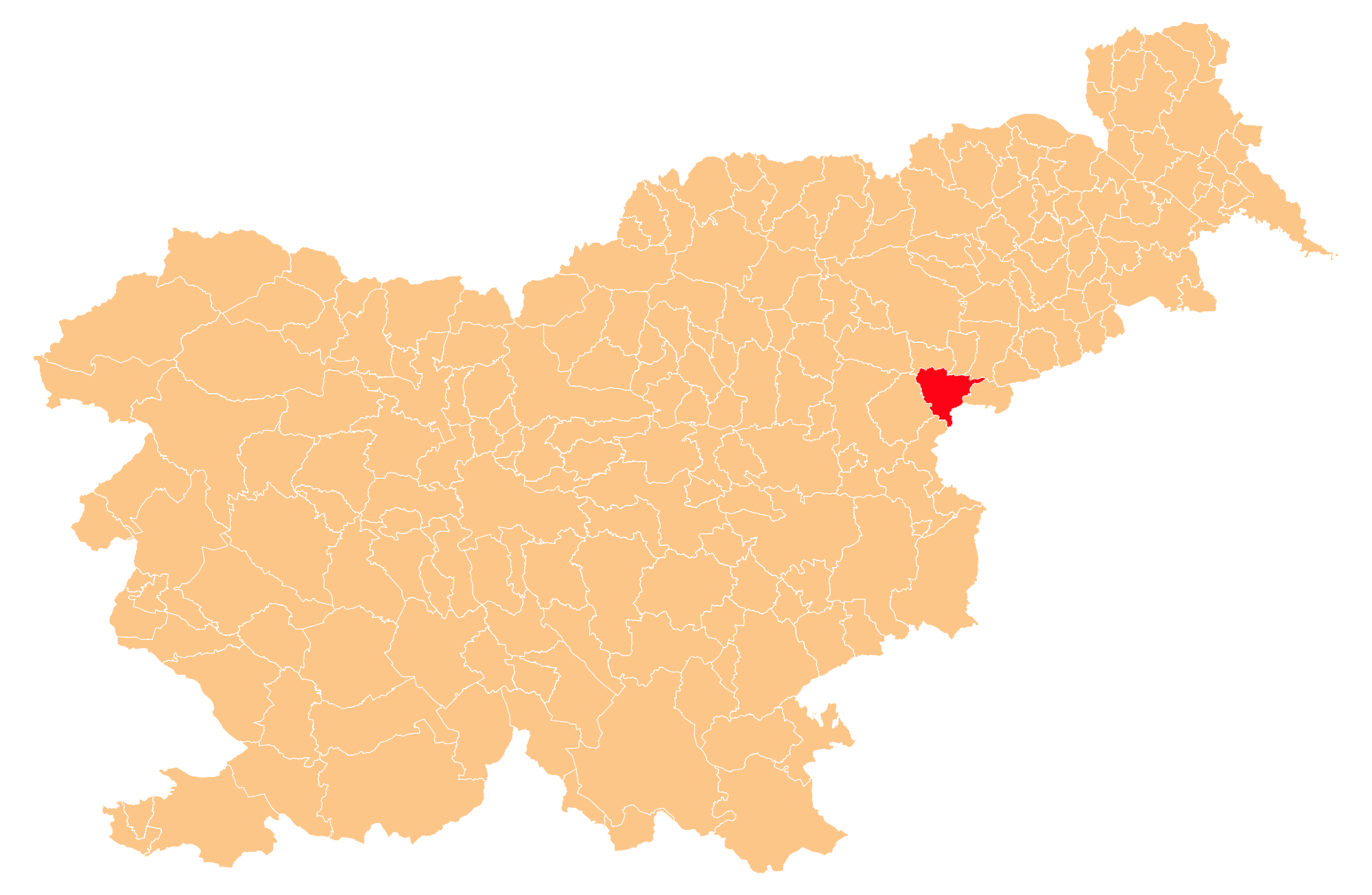
- Location of the Municipality of Rogaška Slatina in Slovenia
- Coordinates: 46°15′N 15°38′E
- Country: Slovenia

Government
  - Mayor: Branko Kidrič

Area
  - Total: 71.5 km^{2} (27.6 sq mi)

Population (July 1, 2018)
  - Total: 11,070
  - Density: 155/km^{2} (401/sq mi)
- Time zone: UTC+01 (CET)
  - Summer (DST): UTC+02 (CEST)
- Website: www.rogaska-slatina.si

The Municipality of Rogaška Slatina (pronounced [ɾɔˈɡaːʃka ˈslaːtina]; Slovene: Občina Rogaška Slatina) is a municipality in the traditional region of Styria in northeastern Slovenia. The seat of the municipality is the town of Rogaška Slatina. Rogaška Slatina became a municipality in 1994. It borders Croatia.

== Settlements ==
In addition to the municipal seat of Rogaška Slatina, the municipality also includes the following settlements:

- Brestovec
- Brezje pri Podplatu
- Čača Vas
- Cerovec pod Bočem
- Ceste
- Drevenik
- Gabrce
- Gabrovec pri Kostrivnici
- Gradiški Dol
- Irje
- Kačji Dol
- Kamence
- Kamna Gorca
- Male Rodne
- Nimno
- Plat
- Podplat
- Podturn
- Pristavica
- Prnek
- Rajnkovec
- Ratanska Vas
- Rjavica
- Spodnja Kostrivnica
- Spodnje Negonje
- Spodnje Sečovo
- Spodnji Gabernik
- Strmec pri Svetem Florijanu
- Sveti Florijan
- Tekačevo
- Topole
- Tržišče
- Tuncovec
- Velike Rodne
- Vinec
- Zagaj pod Bočem
- Zgornja Kostrivnica
- Zgornje Negonje
- Zgornje Sečovo
- Zgornji Gabernik
