= Spodnje Sečovo =

- Location in Slovenia
- Coordinates: 46°14′38.33″N 15°39′38.11″E
- Country: Slovenia
- Traditional region: Styria
- Statistical region: Savinja
- Municipality: Rogaška Slatina

Area
  - Total: 1.99 km^{2} (0.77 sq mi)
- Elevation: 262.7 m (862 ft)

Population (2002)
  - Total: 429

Spodnje Sečovo (pronounced [ˈspoːdnjɛ sɛˈtʃɔːʋɔ] or [ˈspoːdnjɛ sɛˈtʃoːʋɔ]) is a settlement in the Municipality of Rogaška Slatina in eastern Slovenia. It lies just northeast of the town of Rogaška Slatina. The entire area is part of the traditional region of Styria. It is now included in the Savinja Statistical Region.
