= Globoko ob Dravinji =

Globoko ob Dravinji Globoko (until 1998)
- Location in Slovenia
- Coordinates: 46°18′47.7″N 15°38′47.37″E
- Country: Slovenia
- Traditional region: Styria
- Statistical region: Drava
- Municipality: Poljčane

Area
  - Total: 0.93 km^{2} (0.36 sq mi)
- Elevation: 248.9 m (817 ft)

Population (2002)
  - Total: 81

Globoko ob Dravinji (pronounced [ɡlɔˈbɔːkɔ ɔb dɾaˈʋiːnji]) is a village on the left bank of the Dravinja River in the Municipality of Poljčane in northeastern Slovenia. The area is part of the traditional region of Styria. It is now included with the rest of the municipality in the Drava Statistical Region.

== Name ==
The settlement was formerly simply named Globoko, and it was renamed Globoko ob Dravinji in 1998.
