= Topole, Rogaška Slatina =

Topole
- Location in Slovenia
- Coordinates: 46°14′0.03″N 15°36′58.02″E
- Country: Slovenia
- Traditional region: Styria
- Statistical region: Savinja
- Municipality: Rogaška Slatina

Area
  - Total: 1.03 km^{2} (0.40 sq mi)
- Elevation: 351.2 m (1,152 ft)

Population (2002)
  - Total: 205

Topole (pronounced [tɔˈpoːlɛ]) is a settlement in the Municipality of Rogaška Slatina in eastern Slovenia. The wider area around Rogaška Slatina is part of the traditional region of Styria. It is now included in the Savinja Statistical Region.
