= Brezje pri Podplatu =

- Location in Slovenia
- Coordinates: 46°15′19.53″N 15°34′26.22″E
- Country: Slovenia
- Traditional region: Styria
- Statistical region: Savinja
- Municipality: Rogaška Slatina

Area
  - Total: 0.34 km^{2} (0.13 sq mi)
- Elevation: 258.7 m (849 ft)

Population (2002)
  - Total: 55

Brezje pri Podplatu (pronounced [ˈbɾeːzjɛ pɾi pɔtˈplaːtu], German: Bresje) is a small settlement in the Municipality of Rogaška Slatina in eastern Slovenia. The area belongs to the traditional Styria region and is now included in the Savinja Statistical Region.

== Name ==
The name of the settlement was changed from Brezje to Brezje pri Podplatu in 1953.
