= Malo Globoko =

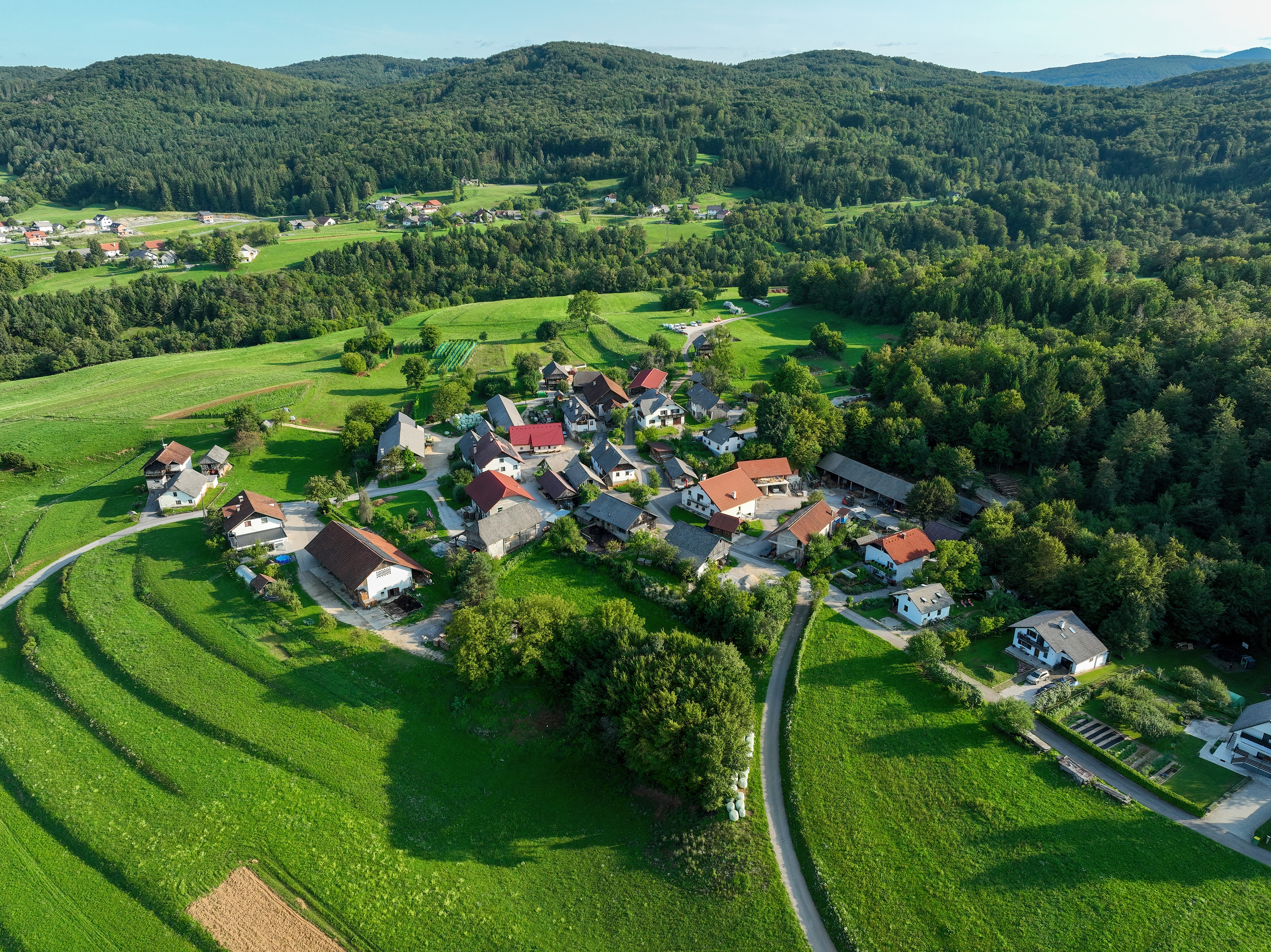

- Location in Slovenia
- Coordinates: 45°51′38.74″N 14°49′33.6″E
- Country: Slovenia
- Traditional region: Lower Carniola
- Statistical region: Central Slovenia
- Municipality: Ivančna Gorica

Area
  - Total: 0.71 km^{2} (0.27 sq mi)
- Elevation: 293.8 m (964 ft)

Population (2002)
  - Total: 49

Malo Globoko (pronounced [ˈmaːlɔ ɡlɔˈbɔːkɔ]) is a small settlement on the right bank of the Krka River opposite Fužina in the Municipality of Ivančna Gorica in central Slovenia. The area is part of the historical region of Lower Carniola. The municipality is now included in the Central Slovenia Statistical Region.
