= Brezje pri Poljčanah =

- Location in Slovenia
- Coordinates: 46°18′53.82″N 15°35′55.42″E
- Country: Slovenia
- Traditional region: Styria
- Statistical region: Drava
- Municipality: Poljčane

Area
  - Total: 2.19 km^{2} (0.85 sq mi)
- Elevation: 310.4 m (1,018 ft)

Population (2002)
  - Total: 123

Brezje pri Poljčanah (pronounced [ˈbɾeːzjɛ pɾi pɔlˈtʃaːnax]) is a settlement in the hills above the left bank of the Dravinja River in the Municipality of Poljčane in northeastern Slovenia. The area is part of the traditional region of Styria. It is now included with the rest of the municipality in the Drava Statistical Region.
