= Vinec, Rogaška Slatina =

Vinec
- Location in Slovenia
- Coordinates: 46°12′5.59″N 15°38′15.57″E
- Country: Slovenia
- Traditional region: Styria
- Statistical region: Savinja
- Municipality: Rogaška Slatina

Area
  - Total: 0.72 km^{2} (0.28 sq mi)
- Elevation: 281.9 m (925 ft)

Population (2002)
  - Total: 23

Vinec (pronounced [ˈʋiːnəts]) is a small settlement in the Municipality of Rogaška Slatina in eastern Slovenia, very close to the border with Croatia. The wider area around Rogaška Slatina is part of the traditional region of Styria. It is now included in the Savinja Statistical Region.
