= Poljčane =

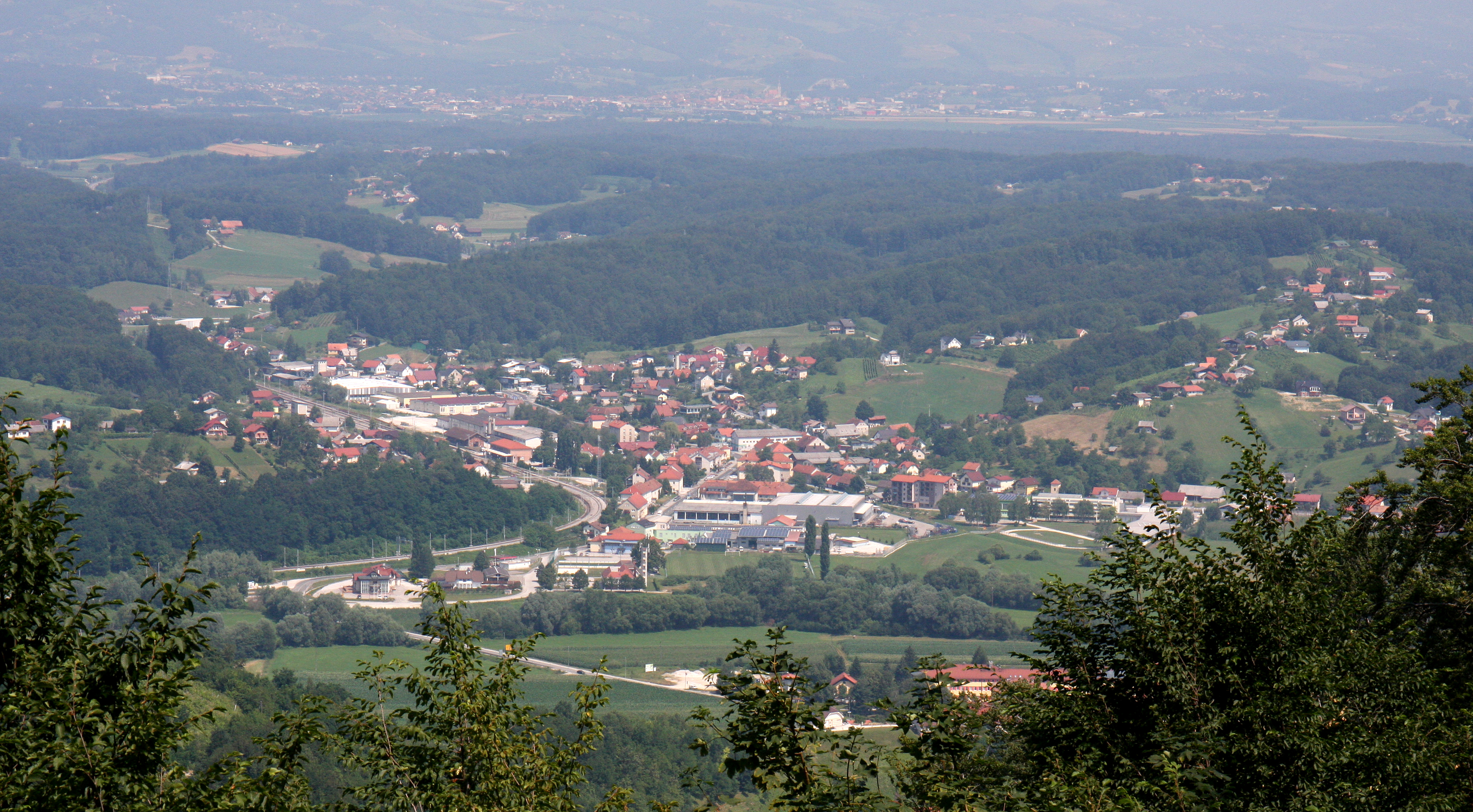

- Flag Coat of arms

- Location in Slovenia
- Coordinates: 46°18′48.68″N 15°34′44.78″E
- Country: Slovenia
- Traditional region: Styria
- Statistical region: Drava
- Municipality: Poljčane

Area
  - Total: 2.50 km^{2} (0.97 sq mi)
- Elevation: 261.6 m (858 ft)

Population (2019)
  - Total: 1,118

Poljčane (pronounced [pɔlˈtʃaːnɛ]) is a settlement in northeastern Slovenia. It is the seat of the Municipality of Poljčane. It lies 35 km south of Maribor and 35 km northeast of Celje. The area is part of the traditional region of Styria. The town lies in the Dravinja Valley north of Mount Boč. It is a crossing of two important regional roads, the route from Maribor to Rogaška Slatina and the route from Celje to Ptuj. The railway line from Ljubljana to Maribor runs through the settlement, and the town has a railway station. There are also a primary school, a health centre, a post office, two supermarkets, a small inn, bars, and some restaurants.

== History ==
Poljčane was officially created in 1957, when the former villages of Maharska Vas and Pekel pri Poljčanah were merged into a single settlement.

== Recreation ==
Poljčane is a popular starting point for excursions to Mount Boč, a popular destination for day trips with mountain bikes or on foot. The top of the mountain offers a view of eastern Slovenia.

== Economy ==
The town has some industry; mostly wood production, construction, and electronics. The surrounding area is also heavily cultivated. Many people commute to work to Slovenska Bistrica, Pragersko, Maribor, Slovenske Konjice, and Celje.
