= Kamna Gorca =

- Location in Slovenia
- Coordinates: 46°14′29.28″N 15°35′38.52″E
- Country: Slovenia
- Traditional region: Styria
- Statistical region: Savinja
- Municipality: Rogaška Slatina

Area
  - Total: 0.93 km^{2} (0.36 sq mi)
- Elevation: 289.7 m (950 ft)

Population (2002)
  - Total: 92

Kamna Gorca (pronounced [ˈkaːmna ˈɡɔːɾtsa]) is a small settlement west of Rogaška Slatina in eastern Slovenia. The entire area belongs to the traditional region of Styria. It is now included in the Savinja Statistical Region.
