= Municipality of Poljčane =

Municipality of Slovenia

Municipality of Poljčane Občina Poljčane
- Municipality
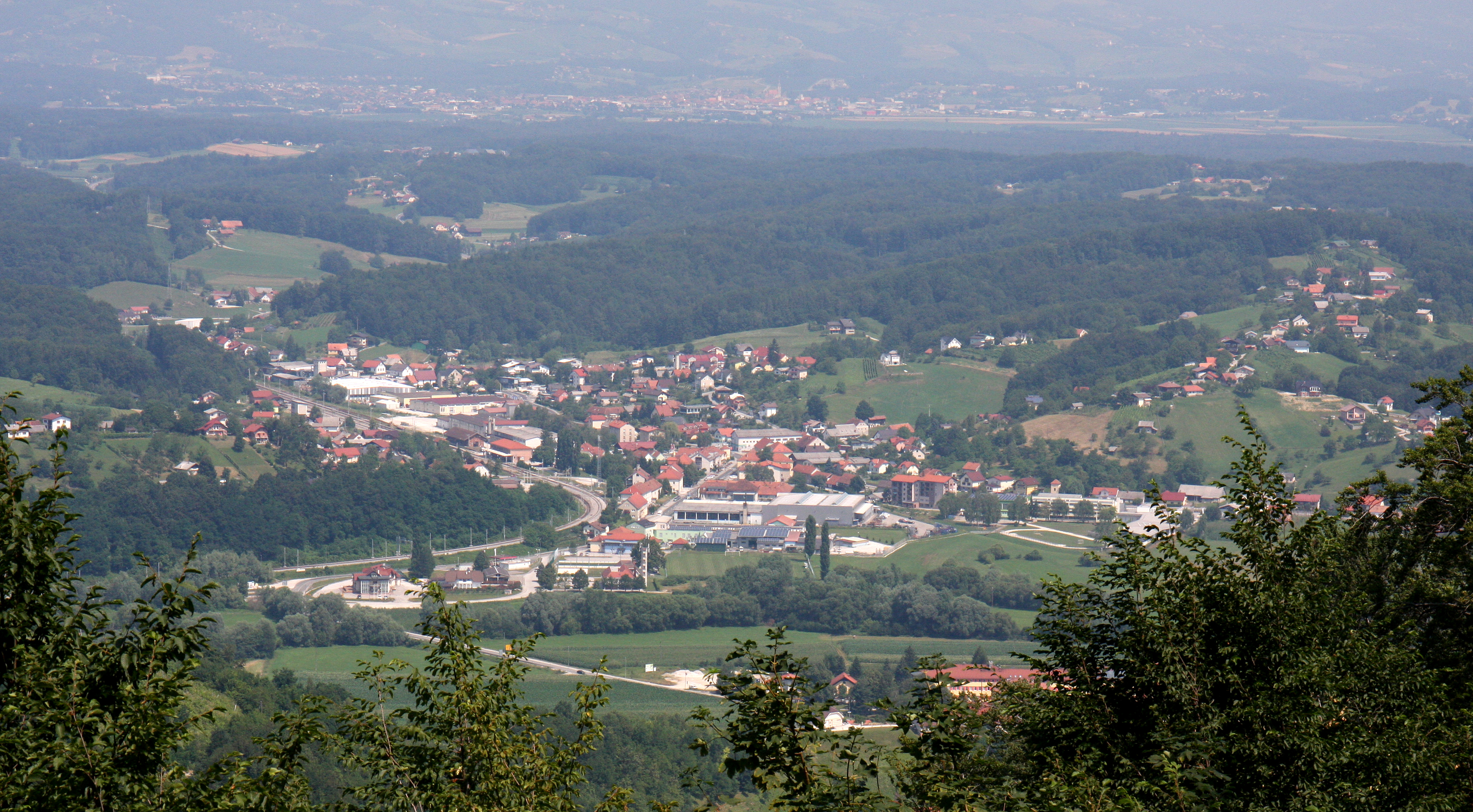

- Location of the Municipality of Poljčane in Slovenia
- Coordinates: 46°19′N 15°40′E
- Country: Slovenia

Government
  - Mayor: Petra Vrhovnik (Independent)

Area
  - Total: 37.5 km^{2} (14.5 sq mi)

Population (July 1, 2018)
  - Total: 4,489
  - Density: 120/km^{2} (310/sq mi)
- Time zone: UTC+01 (CET)
  - Summer (DST): UTC+02 (CEST)
- Website: www.poljcane.si

The Municipality of Poljčane (pronounced [pɔlˈtʃaːnɛ]; Slovene: Občina Poljčane) is a municipality in the traditional region of Styria in northeastern Slovenia. The seat of the municipality is the town of Poljčane. Poljčane became a municipality in 2006.

Poljčane and the neighboring municipalities in the region

== Settlements ==
In addition to the municipal seat of Poljčane, the municipality also includes the following settlements:

- Brezje pri Poljčanah
- Čadramska Vas
- Globoko ob Dravinji
- Hrastovec pod Bočem
- Krasna
- Križeča Vas
- Ljubično
- Lovnik
- Lušečka Vas
- Modraže
- Novake
- Podboč
- Spodnja Brežnica
- Spodnje Poljčane
- Stanovsko
- Studenice
- Zgornje Poljčane
