= Rodine, Črnomelj =

Rodine
- Location in Slovenia
- Coordinates: 45°35′56.86″N 15°8′44.16″E
- Country: Slovenia
- Traditional region: White Carniola
- Statistical region: Southeast Slovenia
- Municipality: Črnomelj

Area
  - Total: 2.66 km^{2} (1.03 sq mi)
- Elevation: 418.2 m (1,372 ft)

Population (2020)
  - Total: 112
  - Density: 42.1/km^{2} (109/sq mi)
- Postal code: 8340

Rodine (pronounced [ˈɾoːdinɛ]; German: Rodine) is a settlement northwest of the town of Črnomelj in the area of White Carniola in southeastern Slovenia. It is part of the traditional region of Lower Carniola and is now included in the Southeast Slovenia Statistical Region.

== History ==
Rodine was a mixed Slovene and Gottschee German village. A German school was opened in the village in 1906 to serve the German-speaking population and operated until 1919. The Ss. Cyril and Methodius Society (Slovene: Ciril-Metodova družba) established a Slovene school in neighboring Naklo in 1909.

The residents produced wine on a large scale before the 19th-century "Phylloxera plague," after which grape cultivation was restricted and fell. The vineyards were further reduced when the Gottschee Germans were evicted in the fall of 1941 and their vineyards fell into disrepair.

Italian troops entered the village on 28 July 1942. They burned many of the houses and sent 15 of the residents to the Rab concentration camp, where two of them died. Forty-eight vineyard cottages, mostly belonging to Gottschee Germans, were burned during the war; only a handful were rebuilt after the war. During a German–Home Guard military raid from Kočevje against Črnomelj on 14 November 1944, three Partisan soldiers were killed near Rodine.

== Church ==
The local church is dedicated to Mary Help of Christians (Slovene: Marija Pomočnica) and belongs to the Parish of Črnomelj. It dates to the late 17th century.

== Notable people ==
Notable people that were born or lived in Rodine include:

- Vinko Beličič (1913–1999), poet and writer
