= Zgornja Kostrivnica =

- Location in Slovenia
- Coordinates: 46°15′33″N 15°35′27″E
- Country: Slovenia
- Traditional region: Styria
- Statistical region: Savinja
- Municipality: Rogaška Slatina

Area
  - Total: 1.47 km^{2} (0.57 sq mi)
- Elevation: 297.8 m (977 ft)

Population (2002)
  - Total: 133

Zgornja Kostrivnica (pronounced [ˈzɡoːɾnja kɔˈstɾiːu̯nitsa], German: Oberkostreinitz) is a settlement in the Municipality of Rogaška Slatina in eastern Slovenia. The wider area around Rogaška Slatina is part of the traditional region of Styria. It is now included in the Savinja Statistical Region.

== History ==
School instruction started in Zgornja Kostrivnica in 1820, when lessons were held in private houses. A schoolhouse was built in 1834 and expanded in 1877.

=== Mass grave ===
Zgornja Kostrivnica is the site of a mass grave associated with the Second World War. The Cemetery Mass Grave (Slovene: Grobišče na pokopališču) is located in a grassy area in the southwest part of the village cemetery. It contains the remains of 17 people.

== Church ==
The parish church in the settlement is dedicated to the Virgin of Częstochowa (Slovene: Čenstohovska Mati Božja). It was built in 1786. The chancel was added in 1835 and an oratory in 1859. The main altar dates from 1769 and was transferred from Saint Aloysius Gonzaga Church in Maribor. The pulpit and the four side altars date from 1859; they were created by France Kotnik and incorporate older sculpted elements dating from c. 1770.
