= Boč =

Mountain in Slovenia

Coordinates: 46°17′21.78″N 15°35′58.56″E

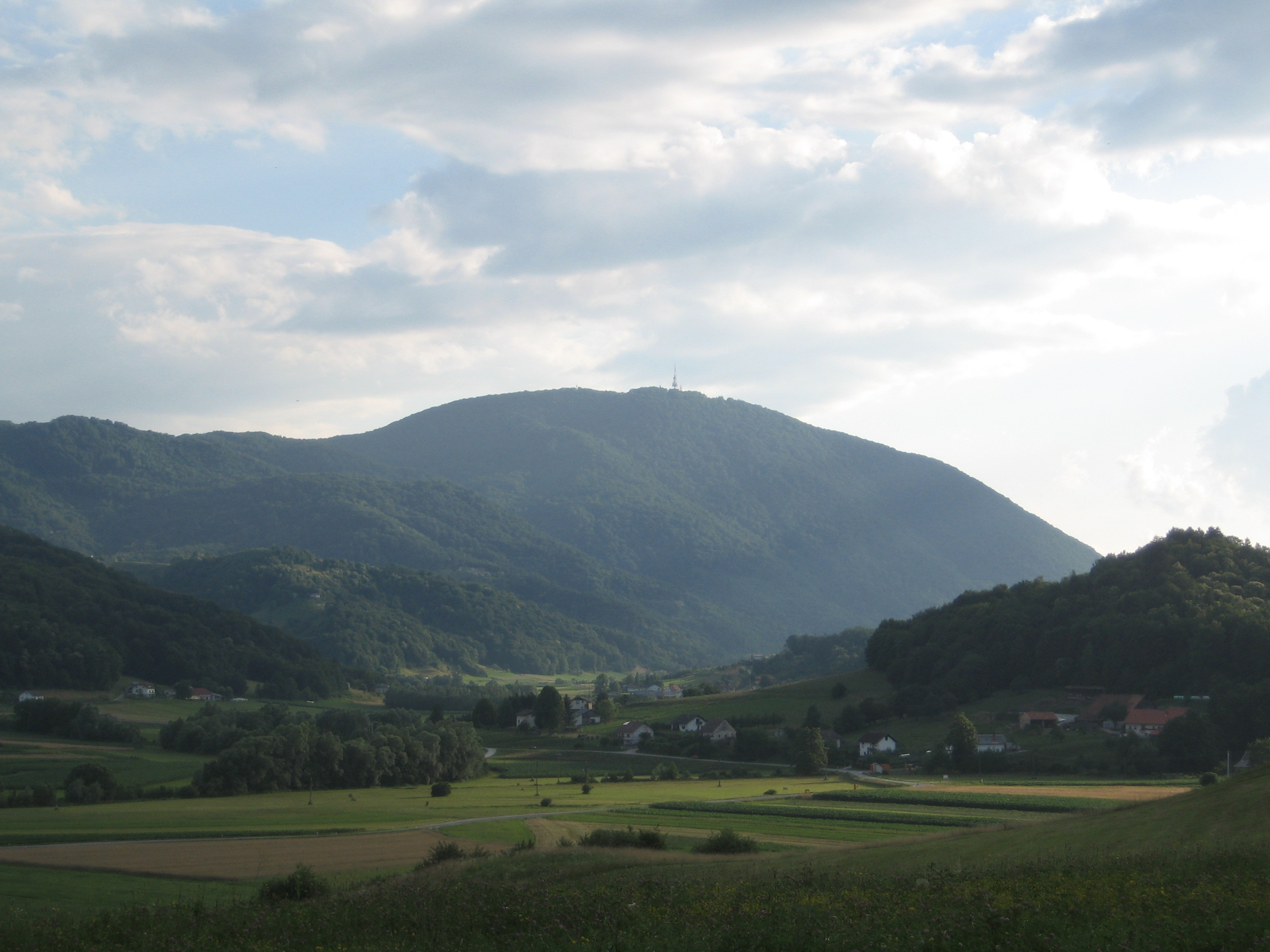
View of Boč from the north

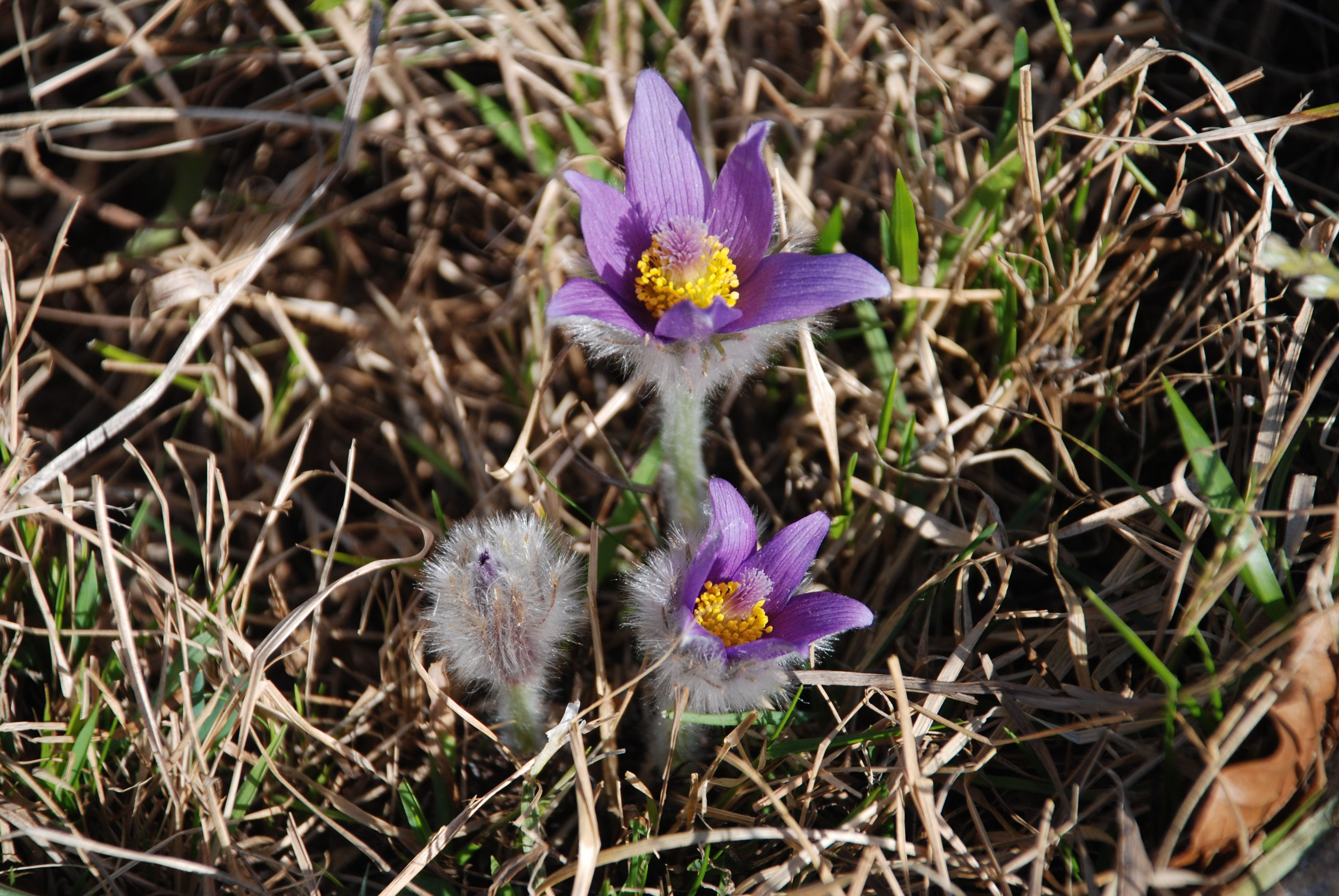
The Greater Pasque Flower (Pulsatilla grandis)

Boč, also called the Triglav of Slovene Styria , is a 978-metre-high (3,209 ft) mountain in eastern Slovenia. It belongs to the municipalities of Poljčane (the peak) and Rogaška Slatina (southern slope). Boč, which is among the southernmost extensions of the Karawanks mountain range, is the central mountain of the Boč–Donatus Mountain Landscape Park. It has two peaks, which are five minutes apart. At one peak, there are transmitters (restricted military area). In the other, a 20-metre (66 ft) lookout tower has stood since 1962. The mountain, covered with forest and protected as a natural park, has a number of trails that vary in difficulty level and is also home to the protected Greater Pasque Flower (Pulsatilla grandis). The plant grows in the vicinity of St. Nicholas Church (Parish of Kostrivnica) and the Hut Under Mt. Boč on the southern slope of Boč. A sculpture of the Greater Pasque Flower, work of the sculptor Franc Tobias from Razvanje, has been put on display on a small rise near its growing place.

== Speleology ==
Names	Depth	Length	State	Number	Elevation	Coordinates	Sources
Balunjača	1	9		SI01067	875		
Belikovka	5	25		SI04659	390		
Belojača	23	550		SI02204	350		
Jama pod kamnolomom pri Studenicah	1	7		SI01731	320		
Jama v kamnolomu nad Studenicami	11	32		SI00252	400		
Kolarnica	0	6		SI04663	420		
Mala jama na Boču	6	11		SI01733	880		
Požiralnik na Formili	5	33		SI03309	620		
Požiralnik pri bolnišnici	4	17		SI03308	620		
Požiralnik v Klečah	63	212		SI03379	420		
Spodnja Resenca	5	5		SI04660	510		
Stari Grad 1	6	10		SI08709	450		
Stari Grad 2	5	11		SI08710	450		
Stari Grad 3 (Resenca)	5	24		SI08403	528		
Stari Grad 4 (Resenca)	3	23		SI08404	557		
Stari Grad 5 (Resenca)	3	11		SI08405	554		
Stari Grad 6	16	17		SI08923	440		
Stari Grad 7	4	18		SI08924	435		
Šoštarca	8	15		SI04662	537		
Zgornja Belikovka	14	25		SI04664	440		
Zgornja Resenca				SI04661	570		

== Biology ==
Boč is home to the only known Slovenian Tetrix transsylvanica population.

== See also ==
- List of caves on Bočko pogorje

== Bibliography ==
- Skejo, Josip; et al. (2023-06-30). "Endangered Transsylvanian wingless groundhopper (Tetrix transsylvanica) is not extinct in Croatia and requires urgent protection". Natura Croatica: Periodicum Musei Historiae Naturalis Croatici. 32 (1): 241–255. doi:10.20302/NC.2023.32.17. eISSN 1848-7386.
