= Ulrich II of Celje =

15th-century Slovenian nobleman and feudal lord

Ulrich of Celje
- Count of Celje, Ortenburg and Zagorje
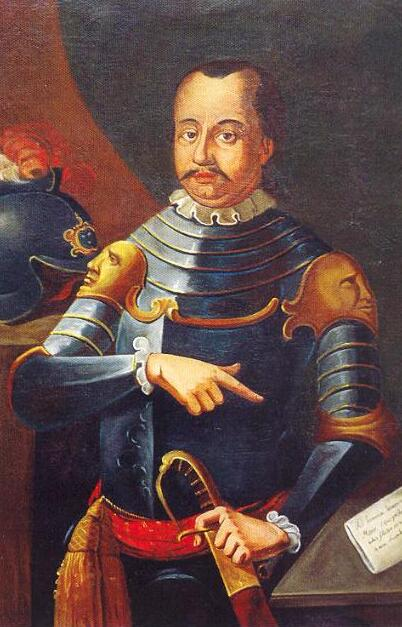
- Portrait (from ca. 1700)
- Holding(s): County of Celje, Slavonia
- Born: 16 February 1406; Krško
- Died: 9 November 1456 (aged 50); Belgrade
- Noble family: Counts of Celje
- Spouse: Katarina Branković
- Issue Details: Hermann IV; Elizabeth; Catherine; George; Albert
- Father: Frederick II of Celje
- Mother: Elizabeth of Frankopan

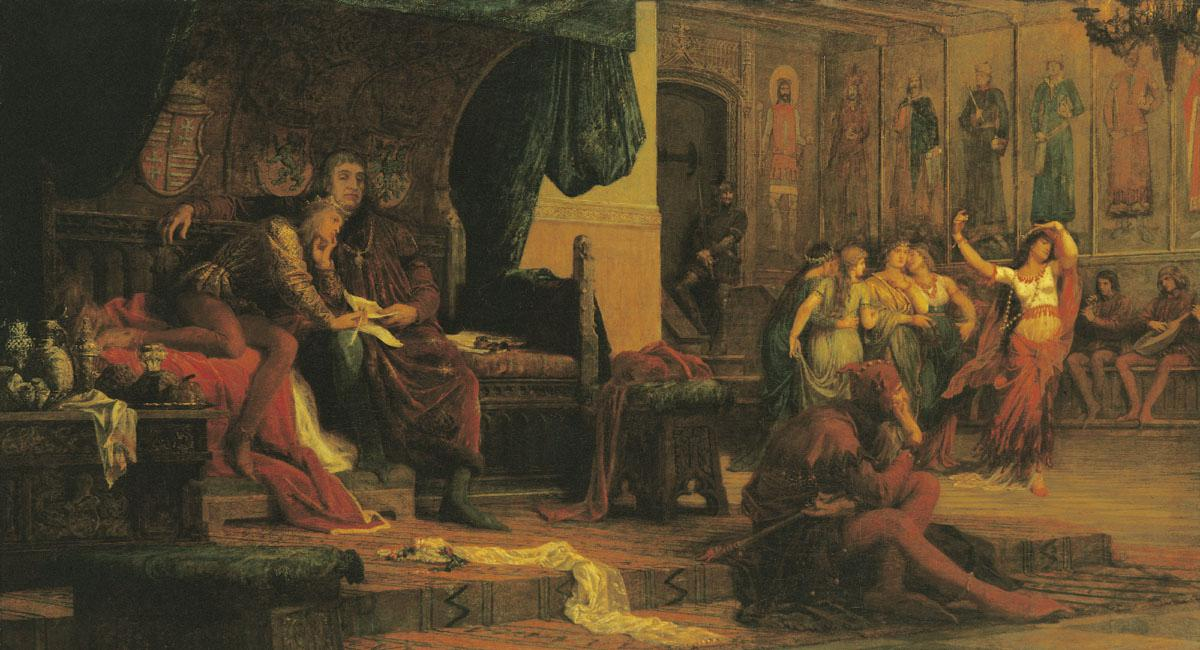
Young King Ladislaus and Ulrich of Celje, 1870

Ulrich II, or Ulrich of Celje (Slovene: Ulrik Celjski / Urh Celjski; Hungarian: Cillei Ulrik; German: Ulrich II von Cilli; 16 February 1406 – 9 November 1456), was the last Princely Count of Celje. At the time of his death, he was captain general and de facto regent of Hungary, ban (governor) of Slavonia, Croatia and Dalmatia and feudal lord of vast areas in present-day Slovenia, Croatia, Bosnia, Austria, and Slovakia. He was also a claimant to the Bosnian throne. He was killed by agents of the Hunyadi clan under unknown circumstances, which plunged Hungary into civil unrest that was resolved a year later by the sudden death of king Ladislas the Posthumous and the election of Matthias Corvinus, the son of John Hunyadi and Ulrich's son-in-law, as king. Ulrich's possessions in the Holy Roman Empire were inherited by Emperor Frederick III, while his possessions in Hungary were reverted to the crown.

== Biography ==
Ulrich II was the son of Count Frederick II of Celje and his wife Elizabeth, a scion of the Croatian House of Frankopan and a grand daughter of Francesco I da Carrara, lord of Padua. Little is known of his youth. On 20 April 1434 he married Kantakuzina Katarina Branković, daughter of Đurađ Branković, despot of Serbia., and the sister of Mara Branković.

His influence in the affairs of the Kingdom of Hungary and the Holy Roman Empire soon overshadowed that of his father, with whom he was raised to a Prince of the Empire by Emperor Sigismund of Luxembourg in 1436. This led to feuds with the Austrian House of Habsburg, wounded in their rights as Styrian overlords of Celje, ending, however, in an alliance with the Habsburg King Albert II of Germany, who made Ulrich his lieutenant in Bohemia for a short while. Upon King Albert's death in 1439, Ulrich took up the cause of his widow Elizabeth of Luxembourg, and presided at the coronation of her infant son Ladislaus the Posthumous with the Holy Crown of Hungary in 1440.

A feud with the Hungarian Hunyadi family followed, embittered by John Hunyadi's failed attack on the forces of the Ottoman Empire at the Battle of Varna in 1444—while Ulrich remained idle—and Hunyadi's refusal to recognize Ulrich's claim to Bosnia on the death of King Tvrtko II (1443). In 1446 Hunyadi, now regent of Hungary, harried the Celje territories in Croatia-Slavonia; however his power was broken at the Second Battle of Kosovo in 1448, and Count Ulrich was able to lead a successful campaign, nominally in the Habsburg interest, into Hungary (1450).

In 1452, he forced Emperor Frederick III to hand over the boy king Ladislaus to his keeping, practically making him a ruler of Hungary, along with his rival Hunyadi. In 1454 his power was increased by his succession to his father's vast wealth; and after the death of John Hunyadi at the Siege of Belgrade in 1456, he was named Captain General of Hungary by Ladislaus, an office previously held by his rival.

Ulrich's triumph did not last: On 8 November, he entered the fortress of Belgrade with King Ladislaus; the next day he was killed by agents of John Hunyadi's son László in unknown circumstances. With him died the male line of the Counts of Celje. He was buried in the Minorite Church of St. Mary in Celje. The eulogy was delivered by the famous humanist rhetorician and prelate Johann Roth.

Ulrich's estates were claimed by his widow Catherine, his son-in-law Matthias Corvinus - the younger brother of László Hunyadi - as well as Count John of Gorizia, and Emperor Frederick III of Austria, who outlived his rivals.

Ulrich's high ambitions were sharply criticized by Aeneas Sylvius (the later Pope Pius II), although his writings were politically minded, as he had served as the personal secretary of Emperor Frederick III at the height of his conflict with Ulrich.

On his mother's side, Ulrich was the closest surviving male descendant of Francesco I da Carrara, lord of Padua. However, he is not known to have ever pressed claim on the Carraresi inheritance.

== Possessions ==
At the time of his death, Ulrich held around 12 towns, 30 market towns and 125 castles: around 20 in Carinthia, Carniola, and Slavonia each, and the rest mostly in Styria. He owned around a third of all castles in modern-day Slovenia at the time.

Some of his most important possessions are listed below.

=== Castles and fortresses ===
- Bela Peč Castle (Duchy of Carniola, now in Italy)
- Čakovec Castle (Kingdom of Hungary, now in Croatia)
- Celje Castle (County of Celje, now in Slovenia)
- Old town Đurđevac (Slavonia, now in Croatia)
- Hartneidstein Castle (Duchy of Carinthia, now in Austria)
- Hohenburg (County of Ortenburg, now in Austria)
- Kostel Castle (Duchy of Carniola, now in Slovenia)
- Krško Castle (Windic March, now in Slovenia)
- Landskron Castle (Carinthia, now in Austria)
- Leskovec Castle (Windic March, now in Slovenia)
- Liemberg Castle (Carinthia, now in Austria)
- Lobor (County of Zagorje, now in Croatia)
- Lož Castle (Carniola, now in Slovenia)
- Medvedgrad (Slavonia, now in Croatia)
- Metlika Castle (County of Metlika, now in Slovenia)
- Ortenburg Castle (County of Ortenburg, now in Austria)
- Ojstrica Castle (County of Celje, now in Slovenia)
- Ortnek Castle (Carniola, now in Slovenia)
- Burg Perchtoldsdorf (Austria)
- Podsreda (Styria, now in Slovenia)
- Polhov Gradec Castle (Carniola, now in Slovenia)
- Prägrad Castle (Carinthia, now in Austria)
- Samobor Castle (Slavonia, now in Croatia)
- Skrad Castle (Croatia)
- Slovenska Bistrica Castle (Styria, now in Slovenia)
- Smlednik (Carniola, now in Slovenia)
- Sommeregg Castle (County of Ortenburg, now in Austria)
- Trakošćan Castle (County of Zagorje, now in Croatia)
- Trsat (Croatia)
- Veliki Tabor Castle (County of Zagorje, now in Croatia)
- Weißenegg Castle (Carinthia, now in Austria)
- Žovnek Castle (County of Celje, now in Slovenia)
- Žužemberk Castle (Windic March, now in Slovenia)

=== Cities and towns ===
- Bakar (Kingdom of Croatia)
- Bardejov (Kingdom of Hungary, now in Slovakia)
- Bužim (Slavonia, Kingdom of Hungary, now in Bosnia)
- Celje (County of Celje, now in Slovenia)
- Čakovec (Hungary, now in Croatia)
- Črnomelj (County of Metlika, now in Slovenia)
- Dravograd (Duchy of Carinthia, now in Slovenia)
- Đurđevac (Slavonia, now in Croatia)
- Gornji Grad (County of Celje, now in Slovenia)
- Gradec (Slavonia, now part of Zagreb, Croatia)
- Jesenice (Carniola, now in Slovenia)
- Kočevje (Duchy of Carniola, now in Slovenia)
- Koprivnica (Slavonia, now in Croatia)
- Košice (Hungary, now in Slovakia)
- Krapina (Slavonia, County of Zagorje, now in Croatia)
- Krško (Windic March, now in Slovenia)
- Krupa (Kingdom of Croatia, now in Bosnia)
- Laško (Duchy of Styria, now in Slovenia)
- Lepoglava (County of Zagorje, now in Croatia)
- Levoča (Upper Hungary, now in Slovakia)
- Lurnfeld (County of Ortenburg, now in Austria)
- Metlika (County of Metlika, now in Slovenia)
- Millstatt (County of Ortenburg, now in Austria)
- Oberdrauburg (Carinthia, now in Austria)
- Paternion (County of Ortenburg, now in Austria)
- Považská Bystrica (Upper Hungary, now in Slovakia)
- Radovljica (Carniola, now in Slovenia)
- Ribnica (Carniola, now in Slovenia)
- Rogatec (Styria, now in Slovenia)
- Samobor (Slavonia, now in Croatia)
- Slovenska Bistrica (Styria, now in Slovenia)
- Spittal (Carinthia, now in Austria)
- Steničnjak (Slavonia, now in Croatia)
- Šoštanj (County of Celje, now in Slovenia)
- Trenčin (Upper Hungary, now in Slovakia
- Varaždin (Slavonia, County of Zagorje, now in Croatia)
- Vrbovec (Slavonia, now in Croatia)
- Vuzenica (Styria, now in Slovenia)
- Žalec (County of Celje, now in Slovenia)

== Marriage and children ==
On 20 April 1434, Ulrich married Princess Katarina Brankovic of Serbia. She was a daughter of Despot Đurađ Branković of Serbia and Princess Eirene Kantakouzene of Byzantium. Through this marriage, Ulrich became the brother-in-law of the Ottoman sultan Murad II. Ulrich and Katarina had five children, all of whom died before their parents:

1. Herman IV of Celje (1439 – 1452)
2. Georg (c. 1444 – 1445)
3. Albert († 1448)
4. Catherine (1441 – 1441), twin sister of Elizabeth
5. Elizabeth of Celje (1441 – 1455), twin sister of Catherine, first wife of Matthias Corvinus of Hungary

=== Family tree ===
Ulrich of Sanneck	Catherine of Heunburg
Frederick I of Celje ∞ Diemut of Wallsee	Władysław I of Poland
Casimir III of Poland	Ulrich I of Celje ∞ Adelaide of Ortenburg	Hermann I of Celje	Catherine of Bosnia	Elizabeth of Poland ∞ Charles I of Hungary
Anna of Poland	William of Celje	Hermann II, Count of Celje ∞ Anna Schaunberg	Elizabeth of Bosnia	Louis I of Hungary and Poland
Anna of Celje	Władysław II Jagiełło of Poland	Anna ∞Nicholas II Garai	Frederick II, Count of Celje ∞Elizabeth of Frankopan	Barbara of Cilli	Sigismund of Hungary and Bohemia	Mary, Queen of Hungary	Jadwiga of Poland
Catherine of Gara ∞ Henry VI, Count of Gorizia	Ulrich II, Count of Celje ∞ Katarina Branković	Elizabeth of Luxembourg ∞ Albert II of Germany
Leonhard of Gorizia	John II, Count of Gorizia	Elizabeth of Celje ∞ Matthias Corvinus	Ladislas Posthumous

== Ancestry ==
Ancestors of Ulrich II of Celje

8. Hermann I of Celje
4. Hermann II of Celje
9. Catherine of Bosnia
2. Frederick II of Celje
10. Henry VII, Count of Schaunberg
5. Anna of Schaunberg
11. Ursula of Gorizia
1. Ulrich II, Count of Celje
12. Bartol VIII of Frankopan
6. Stephen I of Krk
13. NN, a sister of Ulrich
3. Elizabeth of Frankopan
14. Francesco I da Carrara
7. Catherine of Carrara
15. Fina Buzzaccarini
