= Elizabeth of Celje =

Hungarian noblewoman (1441–1455)

- Born: 1441; Celje Castle, Celje
- Died: 1455 (aged 13–14); Corvin Castle, Hunedoara
- Noble family: Celje (by birth); Hunyadi (by marriage)
- Spouse: Matthias Corvinus (m. 1455)
- Father: Ulrich II, Count of Celje
- Mother: Catherine Branković

Elizabeth of Celje (1441 – 1455), also Elizabeth of Cilli, was the first wife of Matthias Corvinus, the future King of Hungary.

== Family background ==
Elizabeth was born to Ulrich II, Count of Celje and his wife Catherine Branković, daughter of the Serb despot Đurađ Branković. Her father was a Prince of the Holy Roman Empire, with extensive domains in both the Empire and in the Kingdom of Hungary, centered in Lower Styria, Carniola, and Slavonia. Her mother was the sister of Mara Branković, a consort of the Ottoman sultan Murad II.

Elizabeth was most likely born in Celje, the family seat. She seems to have had a twin sister, called Catherine, who died as a child. Elizabeth was baptised in the Eastern Orthodox faith of her mother, an arrangement that aroused consternation in the Roman Catholic milieu of Celje.

All of her brothers, Hermann IV, George and Albert, died before 1452. Thereafter she remained her parents' sole child, and the last offspring of the House of Celje.

== Betrothal ==
Elizabeth was initially betrothed to John of Gorizia, son of count Henry IV of Gorizia, who was living in Celje under the tutelage of her father. However, it was later decided she would marry into the Hunyadi family.

Elizabeth's father and maternal grandfather were long-time opponents of John Hunyadi, as the houses of Celje and Hunyadi were competing for influence in the Kingdom of Hungary since the early 1440s. In June 1448, the two parties reached an agreement on the division of spheres of interest, sealed by Elizabeth's betrothal to Ladislaus, John Hunyadi's firstborn son.

In the autumn of the same year, Hunyadi was defeated by the Ottomans at Kosovo; captured by Đurađ Branković during his retreat, he was forced to return several estates to him. With the help of the pope, Hunyadi had the disadvantageous agreement dissolved; as a consequence, the settlement with the Celjes was called off, as well. Under pressure from the estates, protracted negotiations ensued. In August 1451, a settlement was reached in Smederevo. This time, it was agreed that Elizabeth would marry John's second-born son, Matthias. The wedding was set to 6 December 1453, with the stipulation that should the marriage fail to materialize because any fault attributable to Branković, the latter's castles and other estates in Hungary would be transferred to Hunyadi and his sons.

It was John Hunyadi himself, however, to call off the wedding few months before it was to take place. In the fall of 1453, in fact, Elizabeth's father fell out of favor with king Ladislaus, and Hunyadi took advantage of the situation to dissolve the alliance with the Celjes which limited his autonomy of action in Hungary. By February 1455, however, Ulrich was back in power, and Đurađ Branković was instrumental in renewing the alliance between his son-in-law and Hunyadi in order to secure a common front against the Ottoman threat.

== Marriage and death ==
Following a renewal of the Celje-Hunyadi alliance, Elizabeth was married to Matthias in the spring of 1455, after having converted to Catholicism. By this time, Ulrich of Celje had remained without sons, with his wife approaching forty: Matthias thus became his most likely heir. He was sent to the royal court in Buda where Ulrich now resided as regent, while Elizabeth settled in the Hunyadis' estates; the two young spouses thus served mostly as hostages between their respective families.

In the winter of 1455, Elizabeth fell seriously ill. The famous preacher John Capistran organized public prayers for her recovery. However, she died before the end of the year at the Hunyadi court in Transylvania. With her death, Ulrich of Celje remained childless, and the last link between the Hunyadi and Celje families was cut.

== Ancestry ==
Ancestors of Elizabeth of Celje

16. Hermann I of Celje
8. Hermann II, Count of Celje
17. Catherine of Bosnia
4. Frederick II, Count of Celje
18. Henry VII of Schaunberg
9. Anna of Schaunberg
19. Ursula of Gorizia
2. Ulrich II, Count of Celje
20. Bartol VIII
10. Stephen II of Krk
5. Elizabeth of Frankopan
22. Francesco Carrara
11. Catherine of Carrara
23. Fina Buzzaccarini
1. Elizabeth of Celje
24. Branko Mladenović
12. Vuk Branković
6. Đurađ Branković
26. Lazar of Serbia
13. Mara Lazarević Branković
27. Princess Milica of Serbia
3. Katarina Branković
28. Matthew Kantakouzenos
14. Demetrios I Kantakouzenos
29. Irene Palaiologina
7. Irene Kantakouzene
30. John Uroš
15. Helena Ouresina Doukina
31. daughter of Radoslav Hlapen

== Sources ==
- Baum, Wilhelm (2000). I conti di Gorizia: una dinastia nella politica europea medievale. Libreria Editrice Goriziana. ISBN 978-8886928427.
- Engel, Pál (2001). The Realm of St Stephen: A History of Medieval Hungary, 895–1526. I.B. Tauris Publishers. ISBN 1-86064-061-3.
- Fine, John V. A. (1994). The Late Medieval Balkans: A Critical Survey from the Late Twelfth Century to the Ottoman Conquest. The University of Michigan Press. ISBN 0-472-08260-4.
- Fugger Germadnik, Jerneja (2006). K zvezdam in nazaj: Ob 550-letnici smrti poslednjega grofa celjskega. Pokrajinski muzej Celje.
- Habjan, Vlado (1997). Mejniki slovenske zgodovine (in Slovenian). Društvo 2000. ISBN 961-90349-7-X.
- Kubinyi, András (2008). Matthias Rex (in Hungarian). Balassi Kiadó. ISBN 978-963-506-767-1.
- Markó, László (2000). A magyar állam főméltóságai Szent Istvántól napjainkig: Életrajzi Lexikon [Great Officers of State in Hungary from King Saint Stephen to Our Days: A Biographical Encyclopedia] (in Hungarian). Magyar Könyvklub. ISBN 963-547-085-1.
- Pálosfalvi, Tamás (2018). From Nicopolis to Mohács. A History of Ottoman-Hungarian Warfare, 1389–1526. Brill. ISBN 978-90-04-36584-1.
- Štih, Peter (1999). "Ulrik II. Celjski in Ladislav Posmrtni ali Celjski grofje v ringu velike politike [Ulrich II. of Celje and Ladislas the Posthumous, or the Counts of Celje in the Ring of Great Power Politics]". In Štih, Peter (ed.). Spomini Helene Kottanner (in Slovenian). Založba Nove revije. pp. 11–46. ISBN 961-6017-83-7.
