= Veliki Podlog =

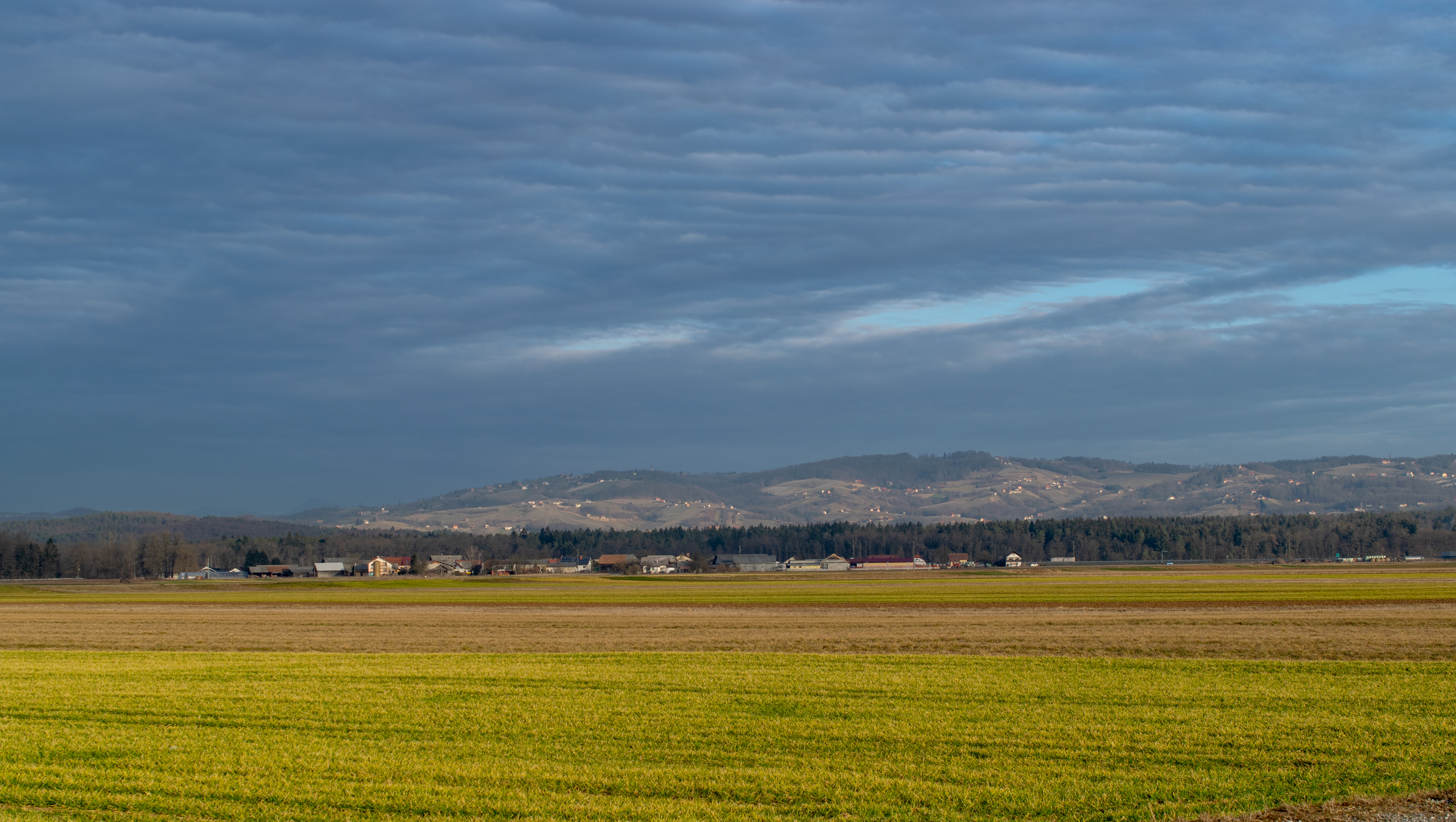

- Location in Slovenia
- Coordinates: 45°53′55.88″N 15°27′10.26″E
- Country: Slovenia
- Traditional region: Lower Carniola
- Statistical region: Lower Sava
- Municipality: Krško

Area
  - Total: 1.97 km^{2} (0.76 sq mi)
- Elevation: 154.8 m (508 ft)

Population (2002)
  - Total: 263
- Postal code: 8273

Veliki Podlog (pronounced [ˈʋeːliki ˈpoːdlɔk]; German: Großpodlog) is a village in the Municipality of Krško in eastern Slovenia. It lies south of the main motorway from Ljubljana to Zagreb south of Leskovec. The area is part of the traditional region of Lower Carniola. It is now included with the rest of the municipality in the Lower Sava Statistical Region.

The local church is dedicated to Saint Nicholas and belongs to the Parish of Leskovec pri Krškem. It dates to the 15th century with some 19th-century Neo-Gothic remodelling.

The western part of the Roman necropolis of Neviodunum has been excavated close to the settlement.
