= Velika Vas pri Krškem =

Velika Vas pri Krškem Velika vas pri Krškem Velika Vas (until 1971)
- Location in Slovenia
- Coordinates: 45°55′8.03″N 15°27′30.81″E
- Country: Slovenia
- Traditional region: Lower Carniola
- Statistical region: Lower Sava
- Municipality: Krško

Area
  - Total: 3.9 km^{2} (1.5 sq mi)
- Elevation: 159.3 m (523 ft)

Population (2002)
  - Total: 267

Velika Vas pri Krškem (pronounced [ˈʋeːlika ˈʋaːs pɾi ˈkəɾʃkɛm]; Slovene: Velika vas pri Krškem, German: Großdorf) is a village southwest of Leskovec in the Municipality of Krško in eastern Slovenia. It lies just north of the motorway from Ljubljana to Zagreb. The area is part of the traditional region of Lower Carniola. It is now included with the rest of the municipality in the Lower Sava Statistical Region.

== Name ==
The name of the settlement was changed from Velika vas to Velika vas pri Krškem in 1971. In the past the German name was Großdorf.

== Church ==
The local church is dedicated to Saint Martin and belongs to the Parish of Leskovec pri Krškem. It is a medieval building that was greatly rebuilt in the 19th century.

== Other cultural heritage ==
Prehistoric and Roman graves have been found in the settlement. Remains of Roman buildings, a villa rustica, a milliarium from the time of Marcus Aurelius, imbrices and tegulae, tesserae, and hundreds of burials point to the proximity of the Roman town of Neviodunum.
