= Elizabeth of Frankopan =

- Countess of Celje; Princess of the Holy Roman Empire
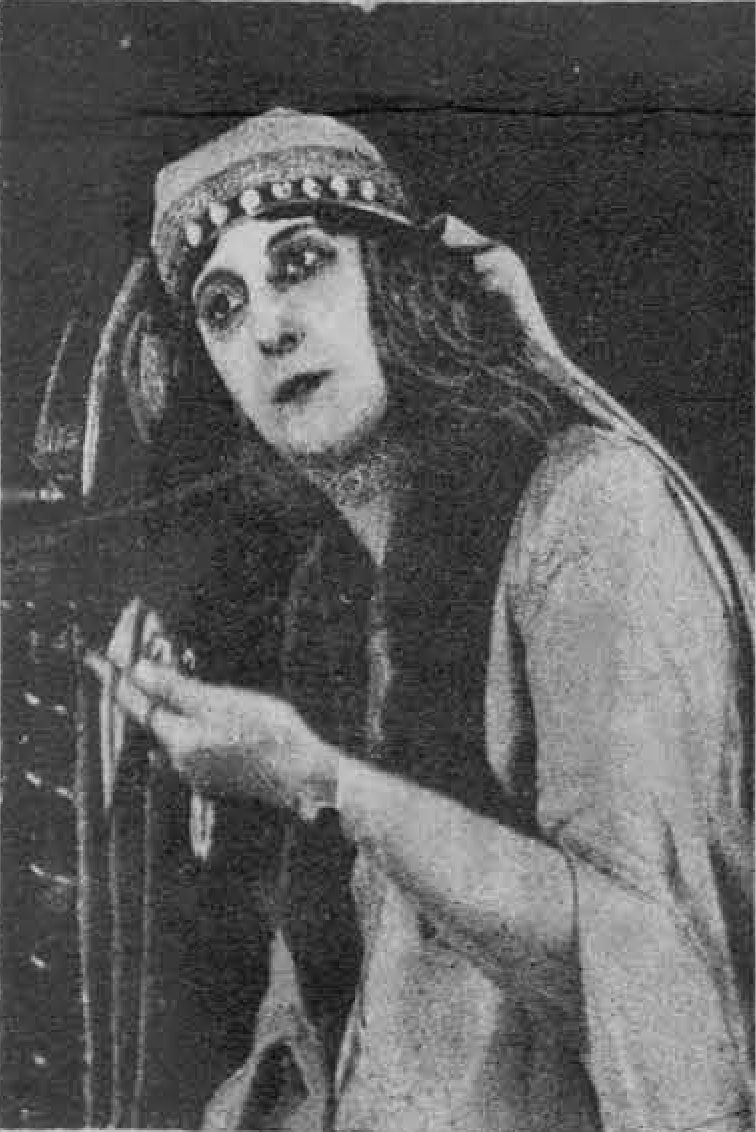
- Actress Marija Vera in the role of Elizabeth in Oton Župančič's play Veronika of Desenice (1924)
- Born: 1386; Modruš
- Died: 1422 (aged 35–36); Krapina
- Noble family: Frankopan
- Spouse: Frederick II of Celje
- Issue: Ulrich II of Celje
- Father: Stephen II of Krk
- Mother: Catherine of Carrara

Elizabeth of Frankopan (Slovene: Elizabeta Frankopanska, Croatian: Elizabeta Frankopan, Hungarian: Frangepán Erzsébet, 1386–1422 or 1423), was the first wife of Frederick II of Celje, son and heir to Count Hermann II, Ban of Slavonia. By virtue of her marriage, she became the sister-in-law of the Hungarian Queen Barbara of Celje. Her marriage was troubled by disagreements with her husband, and in 1422 or 1423 she was found killed in her bed. The main suspect for the murder was her husband, who later married Veronika of Desenice, a woman of humble origin. The affair deteriorated the relations between the Houses of Celje and Frankopan, and led to a long-lasting feud between Elizabeth widower Frederick and her cousin Ivan of Frankopan. In the 19th and 20th century, Elizabeth's fate became the source of many literary and artistic adaptations in Slovenian, Croatian, and Hungarian culture.

== Early life and betrothal ==
Elizabeth was born as the daughter of Stephen, lord of Krk, Modruš and Senj in Croatia, then a kingdom in personal union with Hungary. Her mother was Catherine of Carrara, daughter of Francesco, Lord of Padua. As Stephen's only surviving child, she was "promoted to son" by king Charles II in 1386, and thus granted the right to inherit her father's domains.

When she was two, she was betrothed to Frederick, the firstborn son of Count Hermann II of Celje, the powerful captain (governor) of Carniola and cousin of Queen Mary of Hungary, Charles's successor. Her father set aside a dowery of 40.000 (or 32.000, according to other sources) golden ducats, an enormous sum for the time. In addition, the dowry would include half of the island of Krk, the town of Bakar and the nearby fortresses of Trsat, Bribir, and Vinodol. The unusually large dowry can be explained as part of a settlement between Stephen, his brother Ivan (John), and Hermann of Celje on the division of Stephen's lands after his death.

When Stephen's died in 1390, Elizabeth came under the tutelage of her uncle Ivan V of Frankopan, while her mother was forced into exile to the Windic March, a stronghold of the Celje dynasty. The negotiations around Elizabeth's marriage thus became protracted, as it was clear that her uncle was trying to lower the promised sum, and keep more of his late brother's inheritance for himself. Finally, the initial sum of money was cut in half, but Elizabeth was to receive the estate of Steničnjak in Slavonia, with the strategically important castle of Skrad, instead.

Elizabeth was married to the Celje scion around 1405, probably in one of the Celje estates in Carniola. Count Hermann bestowed the young couple with the castles of Samobor, Kostanjevica, Novo Mesto, Mehovo, and Krško, where they set residence.

== Troublesome marriage and death ==
Elizabeth and Frederick had two sons, Ulrich II, Count of Celje and Frederick III; the latter would die as a child, while the former would remain his grandfather's sole heir. The marriage seems to have been an unhappy one, since the spouses lived separately from at least 1414 onward. The situation deteriorated to the extent that Elizabeth's father-in-law Hermann intervened in an attempt to reconcile the spouses. In 1422 (or 1423, according to other sources), Elizabeth and Frederick met at the family castle in Krapina, in the Slavonian County of Zagorje. Instead of a reconciliation, however, Elizabeth was found murdered in her chambers.

== Aftermath ==
Soon after Elizabeth's death, the rumor that she was killed by her husband spread in Slavonia and beyond, as attested by the anonymous chronist at the court of Celje. Frederick is said to have fled to Buda, where his sister Queen Barbara lived. The chronist Eberhard Windeck who claimed to have witnessed the fallout between the spouses, wrote that Elizabeth had been stabbed in her bed during the night, and that the evening before the murder she had expressed her fears to her entourage: "My lords and friends, what benefit will this reconciliation [with Frederick] bring? I know very well that tomorrow morning, you shall find me dead beside my husband". Historian Nada Klaić expressed skepticism regarding the veracity of these reports.

Elizabeth's death caused a rift in the already precarious alliance between the Houses of Celje and Frankopan who were competing for influence in Croatia and Slavonia. Elizabeth's kinsman Ivan VI Frankopan challenged Frederick to a duel. After the intervention of Frederick's brother-in-law Sigismund of Luxembourg, the dispute was to be settled by the Danish king Eric of Pomerania who enjoyed the trust of both parties. It seems that Eric ruled in Frederick's favor, since he returned to his estates soon afterwards. There, he married Veronika of Desenice, a woman of much lower social standing. He did this without his father's nor the king's consent. This caused Hermann's wrath, leading to Frederick's imprisonment, and Veronika's assassination by the hands of the Celje patriarch.

== Cultural legacy ==
Elizabeth's fate is the subject of the poem Elizabeth of Frankopan (Frangepán Erzsébet, 1836) by the Hungarian Romantic author Sandor Kisfaludy. She is also a side character in the play Veronika of Desenice (Veronika Deseniška), published in 1924 by the Slovenian author Oton Župančič. In Župančič's drama, Elizabeth and Veronika are presented as victims of Frederick's treachery, and the former's death as suicide.
