= Prägrad Castle =

Castle ruin in Austria

Coordinates: 46°41′28″N 14°04′39″E

- Burgruine Prägrad
- Carinthia, Austria
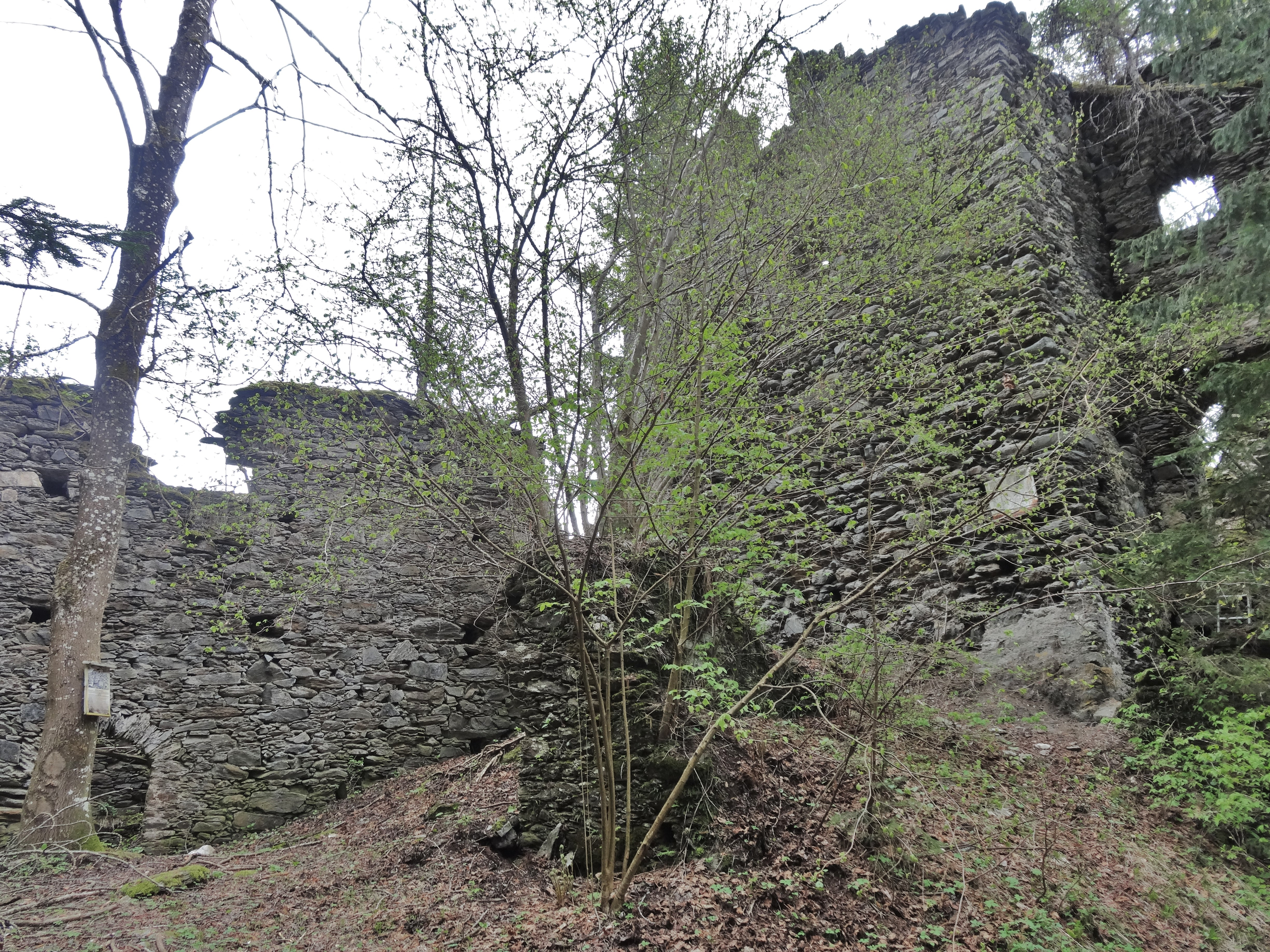

Site information
- Type: Hillside castle
- Owner: Private
- Open to the public: Yes
- Condition: Ruin

Site history
- Built: 12th century

Prägrad Castle (German: Burgruine Prägrad, from Slavic for outer ward) is a ruined medieval castle in Carinthia, Austria. It is located near Feldkirchen on a hillside above the road to Lake Ossiach.

The fortress was mentioned in an 1166 deed when the Nuremberg burgrave Conrad II of Raabs sold it to the Franconian Bishops of Bamberg, who then held large estates in the Duchy of Carinthia. Prägrad served as an administrative seat of Bamberg ministeriales, controlling the traffic on the road along the southern shore of Lake Ossiach to Villach. The Carinthian dukes had acquired the premises by 1258.

Temporarily owned by the Carinthian Counts of Ortenburg, the castle passed to the Counts of Celje in the late 14th century. Upon the death of Count Ulrich II in 1456, it was seized by the Habsburg emperor Frederick III who leased it to the Bishops of Gurk. From 1628 the estates were enfeoffed to Ossiach Abbey.

Remnants of the inner bailey, erected around 1200, and several outer walls are preserved. The remains of a Zwinger laid out about 1400 are visible to the southeast of the complex

== See also ==
- List of castles in Austria
