= Coat of arms of Slovenia =

- Armiger: Republic of Slovenia
- Adopted: 1991
- Shield: Azure within a bordure Gules, triple mountains Argent surmounted by bar-gemel undy Azure abased, three mullets of six points in pile Or in chief.

The coat of arms of Slovenia is an emblem that consists of a red bordered blue shield on which there is a stylised white Mount Triglav, under which there are two wavy lines representing the sea and the rivers of the country. Above Mount Triglav, there are three golden six-pointed stars representing the Counts of Celje. It was designed in 1991 by Marko Pogačnik and adopted on 24 June 1991.

== History ==
=== Habsburg dynasty ===
Historically the modern-day territory of Slovenia consisted of a number of historical lands and territories which were eventually all ruled by the Austrian House of Habsburg. Until the dissolution of Austria-Hungary, the Slovene Lands did not have a coat of arms representing the whole nation; instead, (most of) the constituent lands had their own coats of arms:

- Windic March, later part of the County of Cilli
- County of Cilli, later part of the Duchy of Styria
- Duchy of Carniola
- southern Duchy of Carinthia
- Lower Duchy of Styria
- Slovene March in the Vas county of the Kingdom of Hungary, with the adjacent zones of the Zala county (Beltinci, Turnišče, Velika Polana, Kobilje)
- County of Gorizia and Gradisca, later part of the Austrian Littoral
- Istria (in the modern municipalities of Koper, Izola, Piran, Hrpelje-Kozina, Muggia and Dolina), part of the Austrian Littoral
Arms of the Windic March

Combined arms of the Counts of Cilli and Sannock

Arms of the Duchy of Carniola

Arms of the Duchy of Carinthia

Arms of the Duchy of Styria

Arms of the County of Gorizia and Gradisca

Arms of the Austrian Littoral

=== Kingdom of Yugoslavia ===
Lesser coat of arms of Yugoslavia from 1918 to 1941 with the Slovenian arms in the lower half

When the State of Slovenes, Croats and Serbs merged with Kingdom of Serbia, Slovenia had its first real coat of arms, which actually was a heavily modified one from the Serbian Kingdom. The coat of arms presents the Serbian shield with white cross on the left, the Croatian shield on the right and under both there is a blue shield representing Slovenes. An image of the royal Yugoslav coat of arms can be seen on the 10-Yugoslav dinar banknote of 1926.

=== Socialist Republic of Slovenia ===
The former emblem of the Socialist Republic of Slovenia (1945–1991)

The emblem of the Socialist Republic of Slovenia was designed by Branko Simčič on the basis of the symbol of the Liberation Front of the Slovene Nation. It is in the style of socialist emblem of other communist nations. The sea and the Mount Triglav motif appeared in the emblem of the Socialist Republic of Slovenia, one of six constituent republics of the Socialist Federal Republic of Yugoslavia. The former emblem was rounded by wheat with linden leaves and featured a red star at the top. There was also the other emblem which presented Yugoslavia as a whole.

=== Republic of Slovenia ===
A tender for the design of a new coat of arms of Slovenia was published in May 1991. It was won by Marko Pogačnik, whose design was meant to represent Slovenia as a macroregional entity, and to follow in the footsteps of the poet France Prešeren and the architect Jože Plečnik: the arms reflect the description of nature in Prešeren's 19th-century epic The Baptism on the Savica, and are based on Plečnik's informal 1934 proposal for a new coat of arms of Slovenia (in the form of a pillar dedicated to the Virgin Mary outside the parish church of Bled.)

Pogačnik's design was proclaimed the new official coat of arms of Slovenia with the constitutional amendment C 100, which took effect on 24 June 1991.

=== Historical symbols ===
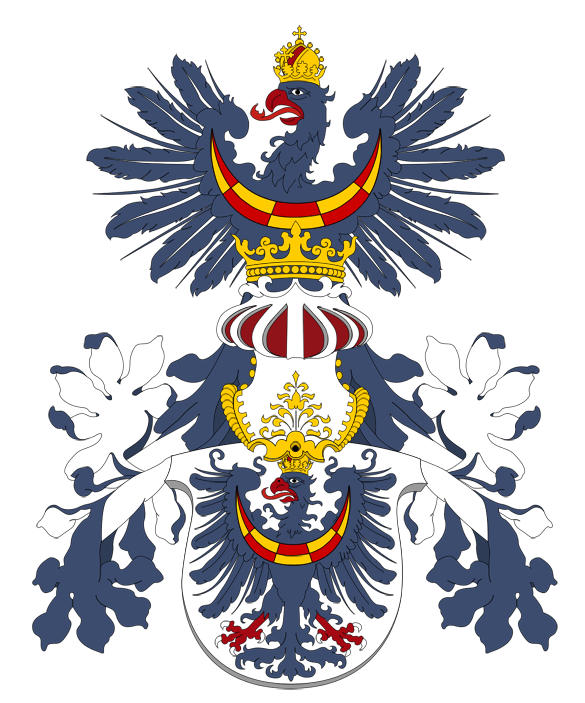
Coat of arms of the Duchy of Carniola (until 1918)

Inescutcheon symbolizing Slovenia and the Illyrian movement on the coat of arms of Yugoslavia (1918–1941)

Emblem of German-collaborationist Slovene Home Guard (1943–1945)

== Symbolics ==
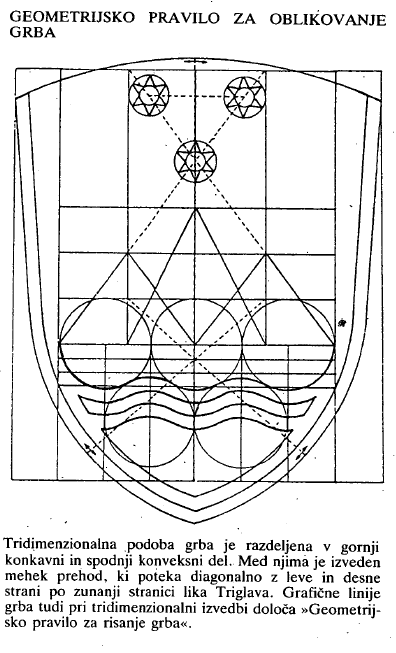
The geometrical rule for the construction of the national coat of arms of Slovenia

The designer, Marko Pogačnik, has described the coat of arms as a cosmogram, whose purpose is to create an "energetic field" intended to protect the country and stimulate its inner potential.

According to Pogačnik, the silhouette of mount Triglav symbolises the male principle, while the two wavy lines below it - representing the Triglav Lakes Valley, the Slovene seacoast, and rivers in general - symbolise the female principle. The three golden mullets above Triglav, taken from the coat of arms of the Counts of Celje, symbolize democracy.

== Legal status ==
As a work of arts, published in the official journal Official Gazette, the national coat of arms of Slovenia qualifies as an official work and is per Article 9 of the Slovene Copyright and Related Rights Act not protected by the copyrights. Its usage is regulated by the Act Regulating the Coat-of-Arms, Flag and Anthem of the Republic of Slovenia and the Flag of the Slovene Nation, published in the Official Gazette in 1994.

== Criticism ==
The coat of arms has been criticized by Aleksander Hribovšek of the Heraldica Slovenica society as heraldically deficient: Mount Triglav (whose choice as a national symbol he questions) and the sea are not represented according to heraldic rules, and the overall arms have no official blazon; the form of shield used is also not heraldically recognised.
