= Leskovec Castle =

15th-century castle in Leskovec pri Krškem, Slovenia

Coordinates: 45°57′6.78″N 15°28′15.75″E

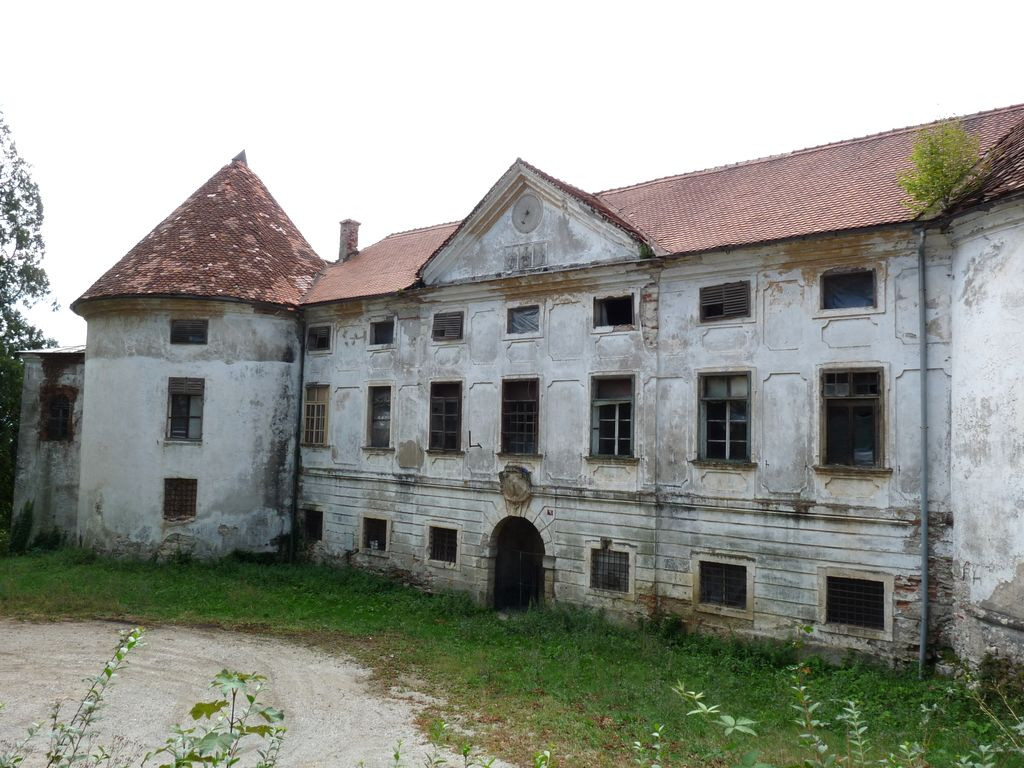
Leskovec Castle

Leskovec Castle or Turn Castle (Slovene: Grad Turn, Turn na Vrhu, Turnska graščina, Šrajbarski turn, Grad Leskovec; German: Thurn am Hart) is a 15th-century castle north of the village of Leskovec pri Krškem (City Municipality of Krško), southeastern Slovenia. It has been redesigned in the 16th and the 18th centuries.

== Name ==
The name Turn is used for several castles in Slovenia. It is derived from the world turen 'tower', borrowed from Middle High German turn 'tower' (in turn from Latin turris 'tower, castle' from Greek τύρσις 'fortified settlement'). The alternate name Šrajbarski turn (literally, 'Šrajbar's Tower') distinguishes this from other castles named Turn. The origin of the epithet Šrajbarski is unknown; it may derive from an early owner. See also Šinkov Turn.

== History ==
Two manors on the site are first mentioned in 1436, held by Baron Johann Dürrer (von der Dur) concurrently with the Counts of Celje, and later sold to the latter. The formidable castle was taken and looted by peasant rebels in 1515. The Counts of Celje were followed by several other owners, including Baron Johann Baptist von Valvasor in 1581, the Counts of Moscon, the House of Auersperg from 1653 to 1903, Baron von Gagern, and a Dr. Trenz.

== Architecture ==
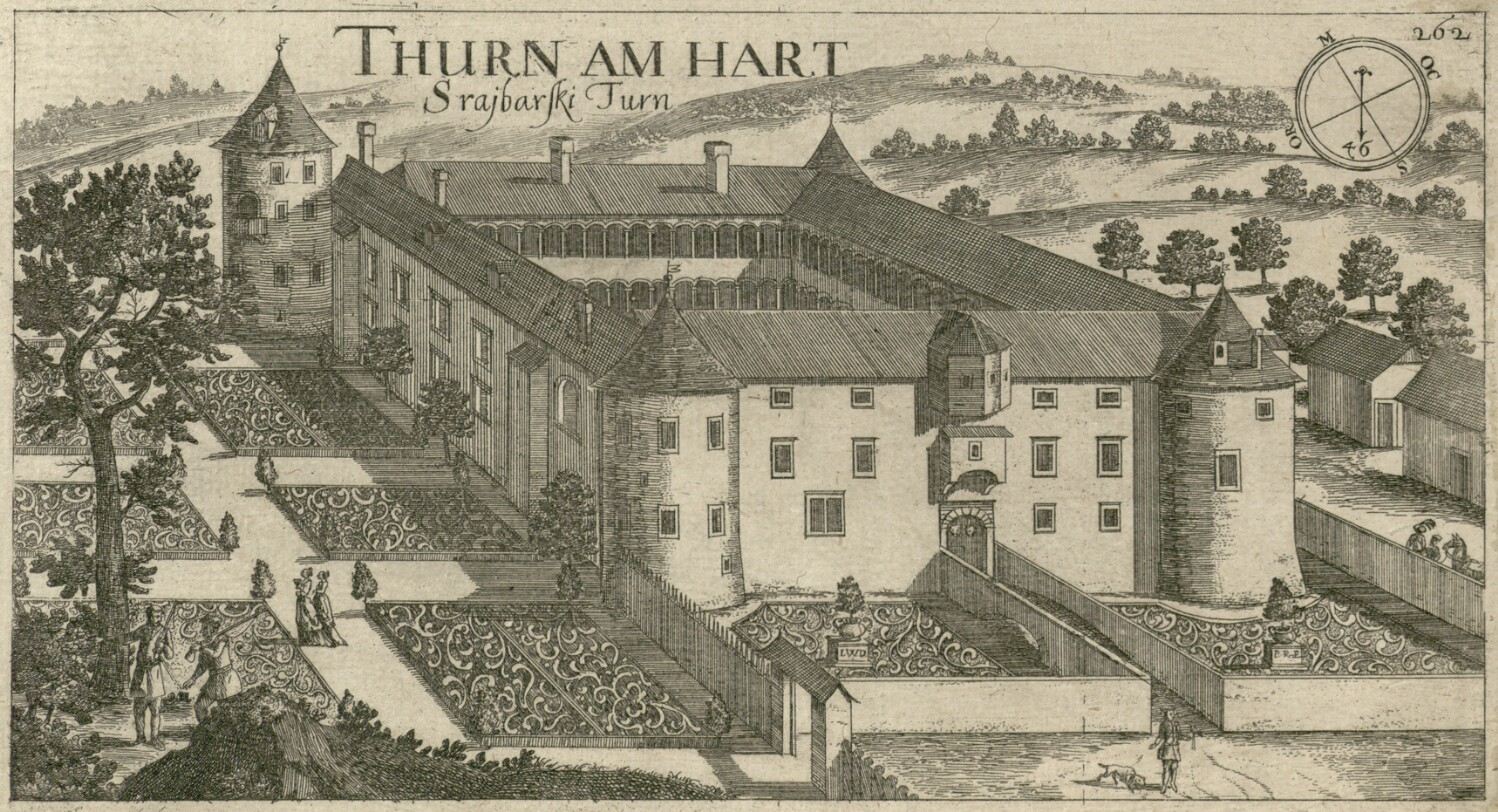
Leskovec Castle in a 1679 Valvasor engraving

Leskovec Castle is a typical example of centrally-based defensive architecture with corner towers and a rectangular, arcaded inner courtyard in the middle. The current structure dates from the second quarter of the 16th century, and was substantially complete by the mid-16th century. The four residential wings enclose the most significant architectural feature of the building, a beautiful arcaded courtyard. Above the main gate to the castle there is a relief of the coat of arms of the house of Auersperg-Falkenhayn; the courtyard wall displays the arms of the noble family Khysl. The 17th century renaissance-style castle park contains a monument erected in memory of Alfonz Paulin (1853–1942), a Slovene botanist and son of the castle warder.

Leskovec Castle and the surrounding grounds were declared a cultural monument of national importance by the government of Slovenia in 1999.

== Sources ==
- Ordinance declaring areas of Turn Castle a cultural monument of national importance, Official Gazette of the Republic of Slovenia 81/1999 dated 05/10/1999
