= Paduan–Venetian border war =

Military conflict

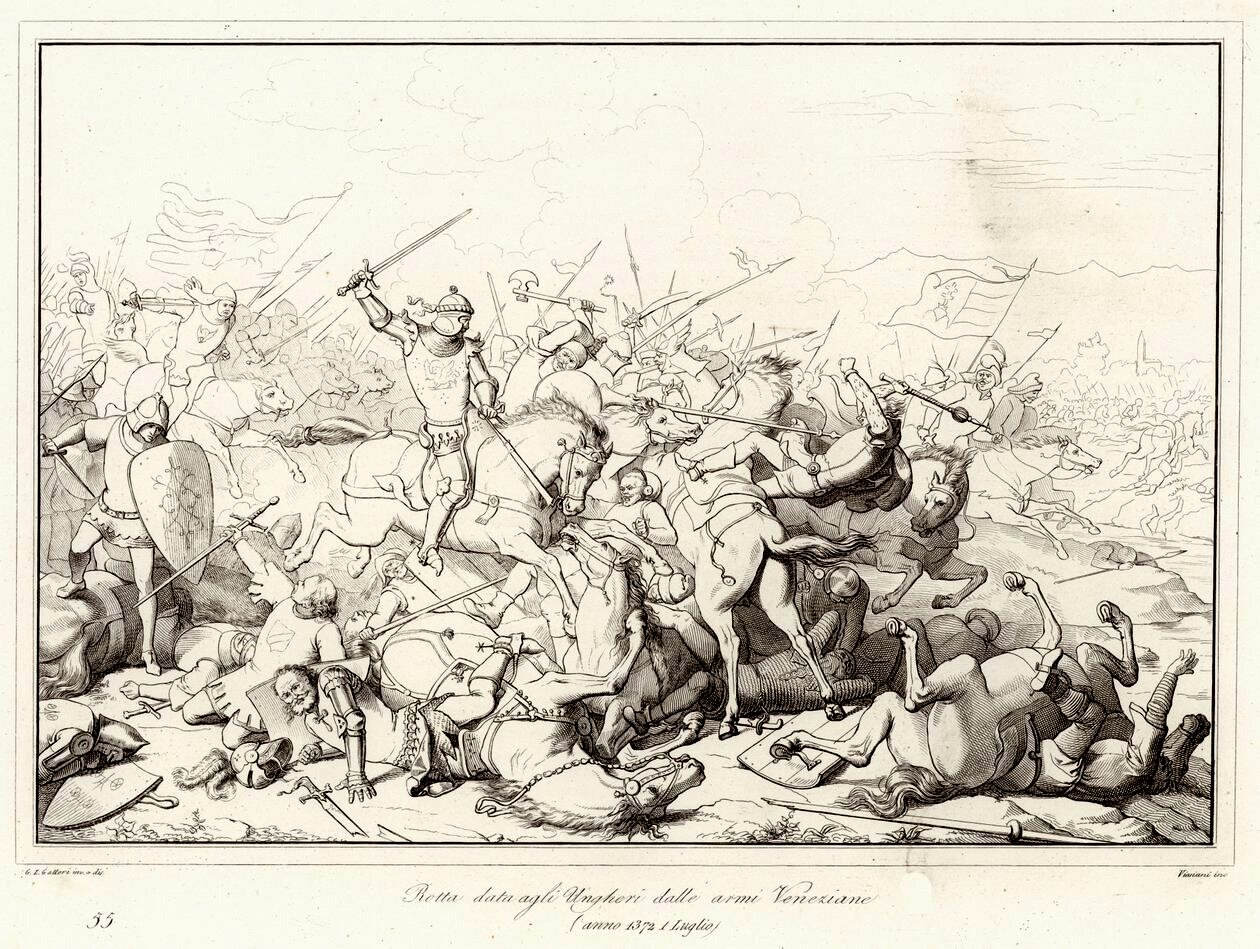
The defeat of the Hungarians at Foss Nuova on 1 July 1373, drawing by Giuseppe Lorenzo Gatteri and Francesco Zanotto

In 1372–1373, the Republic of Venice and the Carrara lordship of Padua fought a border war (Italian: Guerra dei Confini). The war was the result of the ambitions of Francesco I da Carrara, lord of Padua since 1355, who not only overturned the informal protectorate Venice had exercised over his city, but also tried to expand his own domains at the expense of Venice's interests. The immediate cause of the war were the forts Carrara build along the Paduan–Venetian boundary, some within striking distance from the Venetian Lagoon. The war broke out in 1372, and drew in other regional powers in support of Padua, including the Kingdom of Hungary and the Duchy of Austria. Venetian forces were defeated by the Paduans and Hungarians at Narvesa on the Piave River in May 1373, before the Venetians scored a decisive victory at Fossa Nuova on 1 July 1373, capturing Stephen II Lackfi, commander of the Hungarian army. The resulting treaty that ended the war confirmed the territorial status quo, but also obliged Carrara to dismantle his forts, confirm the Venetian salt monopoly, pay reparations to Venice, and visit Venice in person to accept personal responsibility for the war's outbreak. Humiliated but undaunted, the lord of Padua joined the Republic of Genoa when it attacked Venice in the War of Chioggia.

== Sources ==
- Hazlitt, W. Carew (1860). The Venetian Republic: Its Rise, its Growth, and its Fall, 421–1797. Volume III. London: Smith, Elder & Co.
- Kohl, Benjamin G. (1977). "CARRARA, Francesco da, il Vecchio". Dizionario Biografico degli Italiani (in Italian). Vol. 20: Carducci–Carusi. Rome: Istituto dell'Enciclopedia Italiana. ISBN 978-88-12-00032-6.
- Kohl, Benjamin G. (1998). Padua under the Carrara, 1318–1405. Baltimore and London: Johns Hopkins University Press. ISBN 0-8018-5703-1.
- Romano, Dennis (2024). Venice: The Remarkable History of the Lagoon City. Oxford University Press. ISBN 978-0-19085998-5.
- Sambin, Paolo (1946–47). "La guerra del 1372-73 tra Venezia e Padova". Archivio Veneto. 5 (in Italian). 38/39: 1–76.
- Varanini, Gian Maria (1997). "Venezia e l'entroterra (1300 circa - 1420)". Storia di Venezia dalle origini alla caduta della Serenissima. Vol. III, La formazione dello stato patrizio (in Italian). Rome: Istituto della Enciclopedia Italiana. pp. 159–236.
