= Cesta, Krško =

Cesta
- Location in Slovenia
- Coordinates: 45°58′24.57″N 15°27′52.88″E
- Country: Slovenia
- Traditional region: Lower Carniola
- Statistical region: Lower Sava
- Municipality: Krško

Area
  - Total: 1.79 km^{2} (0.69 sq mi)
- Elevation: 379.9 m (1,246 ft)

Population (2002)
  - Total: 78
- Postal code: 8270

Cesta (pronounced [ˈtseːsta]) is a settlement in the hills above the right bank of the Sava River in the Municipality of Krško in eastern Slovenia. The area is part of the traditional region of Lower Carniola. It is now included with the rest of the municipality in the Lower Sava Statistical Region.

== Name ==
Cesta was attested in historical sources as Strazzen in 1343 and Strassen in 1436. The Slovene name Cesta means 'road'. Places with this name in Slovenia lie along roads that predated Slavic settlement in the area.

== Castle ==
The ruins of medieval Krško Castle lie in the territory of the settlement.
