= Burgruine Weißenegg =

Castle ruin in Ruden, Austria

- Carinthia, Austria
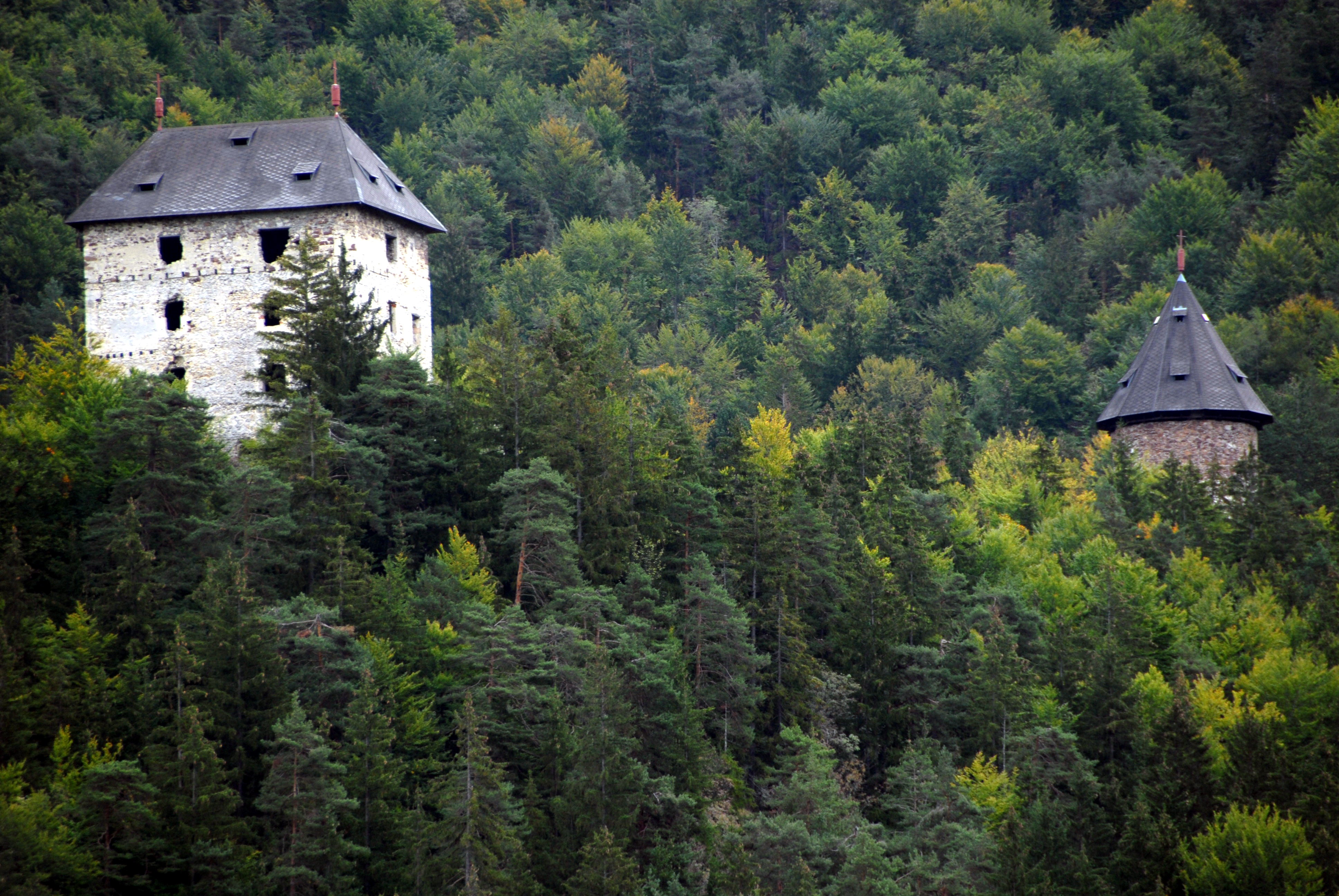
- Ruins of Burgruine Weißenegg in 2006

Site information
- Type: Spur castle

Location
- Coordinates: 46°39′54.5″N 14°46′44.8″E

Site history
- Built: First half of the 12th century

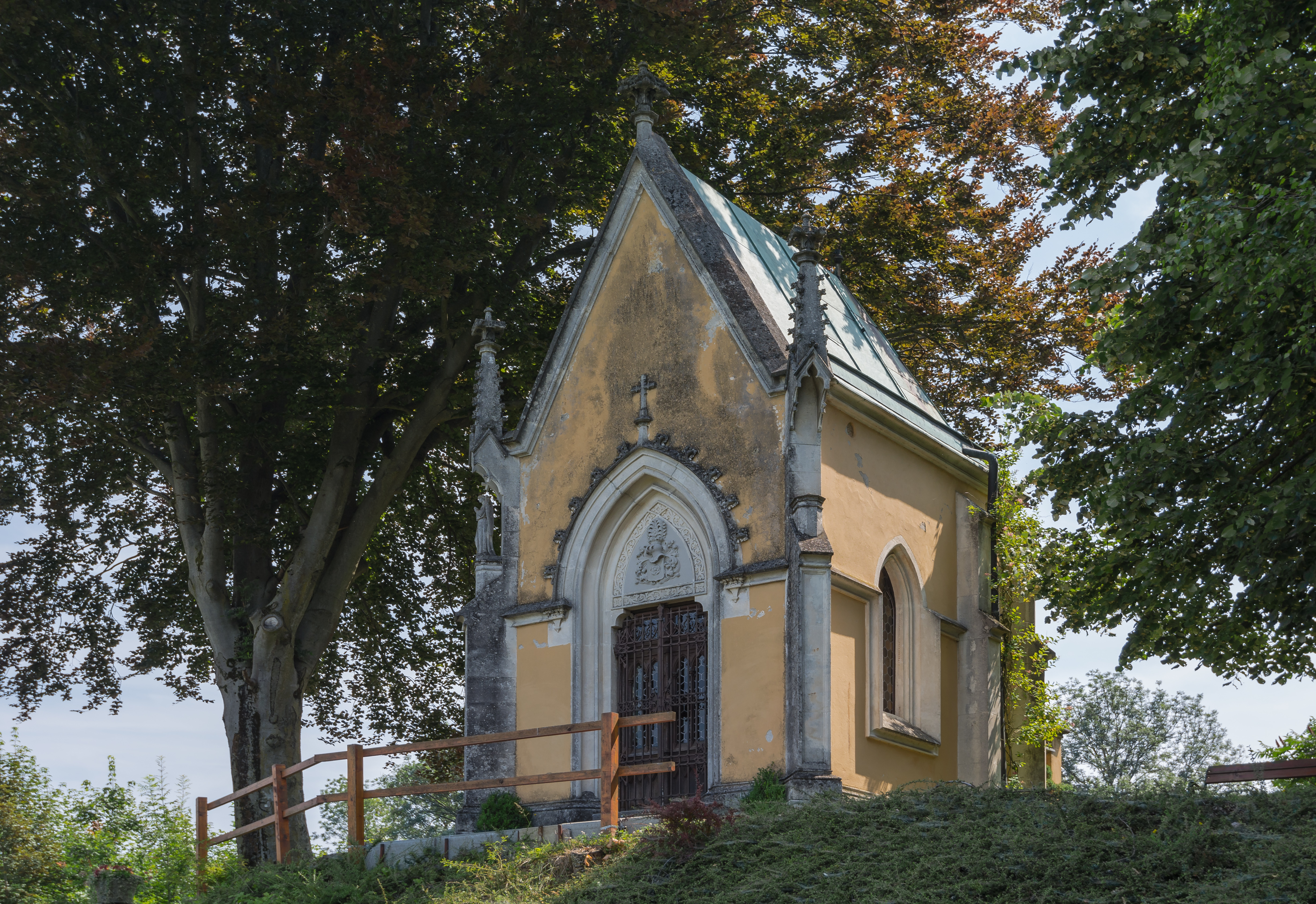
Chapel in Mellach built in 1889 for the owners of Weissenegg, seen in 2015

Burgruine Weißenegg is a ruinous medieval castle in Carinthia, Austria, built in the first half of the 13th century.

== See also ==
- List of castles in Austria
