= Samobor Castle =

Ruined castle in Samobor, Croatia

- Stari grad Samobor
- Samobor, Croatia
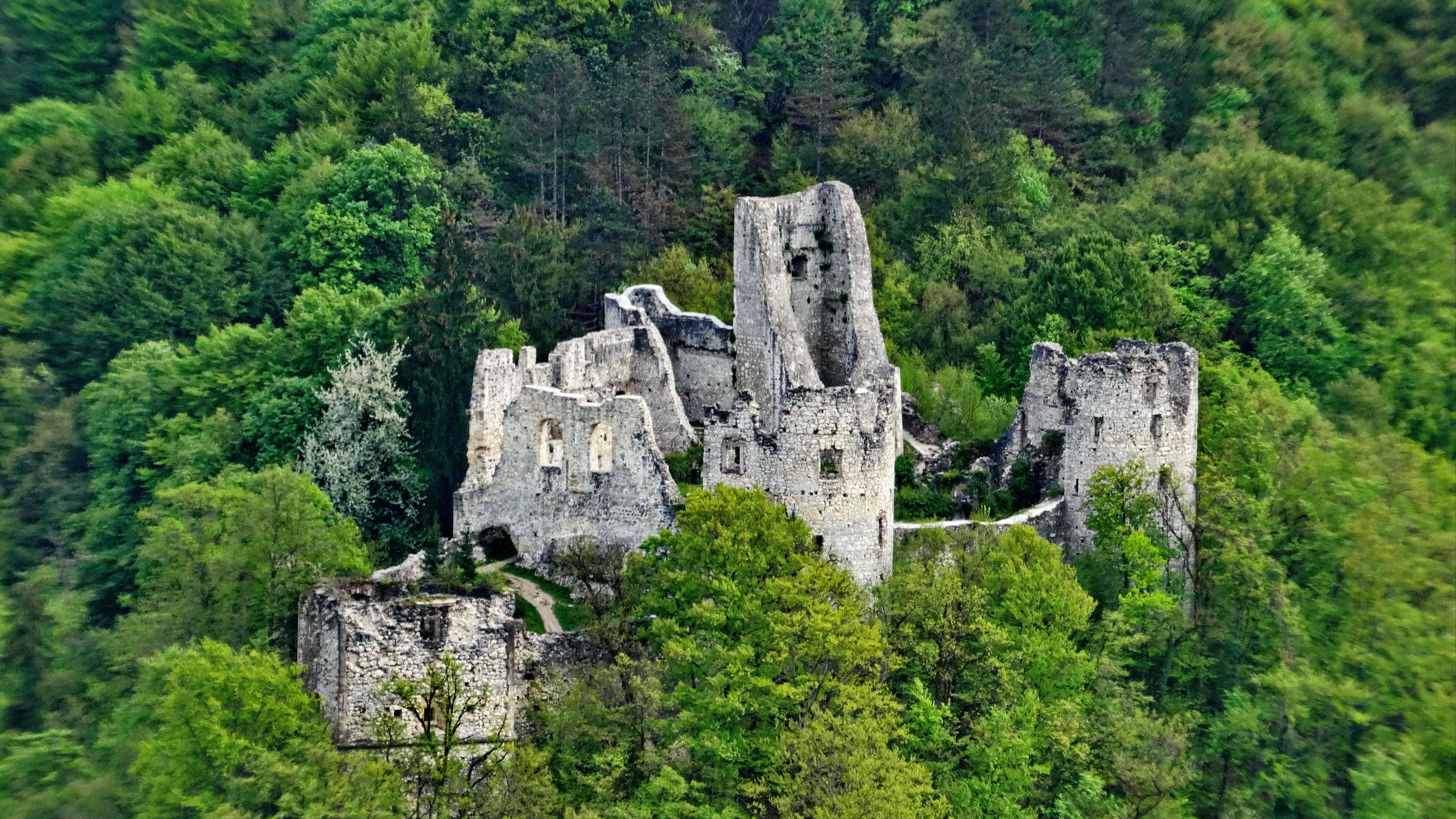
- Ruins of the Samobor castle

Site information
- Type: gothic castle
- Code: HR
- Owner: Municipality of town Samobor
- Open to the public: from the 19th century
- Condition: in ruins

Location
- Location within Croatia
- Coordinates: 45.799°N 15.6984°E

Site history
- Built: between 1260 and 1264
- In use: 13th–18th century
- Materials: stone
- Demolished: 19th century

Samobor Castle is a ruined castle atop of Tepec hill in Samobor, Croatia. It lies only a 10-minute walk away from the city centre. Remains of the old castle moat are still visible, as well as the massive entrance and most of the walls.

== History ==
The castle was built on a hill above the crossroads of then important routes in the northwestern corner of the Sava valley, above the medieval market town of Samobor. The castle was erected by the supporters of Czech king, Ottokar II of Bohemia, between 1260 and 1264, who was then in a war with Hungarian king Stephen V. Croatian-Hungarian forces under command of duke of Okić soon retook the castle, for which he was granted the city of Samobor, as well as the privilege to collect local taxes.

The fortification was originally a stone fortress built on solid rock - in an irregular and indented layout, which consists of three parts, out of which the central core represents the oldest part of the castle. In the southeastern part of the core there was a high guard tower (nowadays in ruins), which is the only remaining original part of Ottokar castle. Just next to the guard tower lies a semicircular tower with a small gothic chapel of St. Ana which is estimated to be built in third decade of the 16th century.

Layout of Samobor Castle

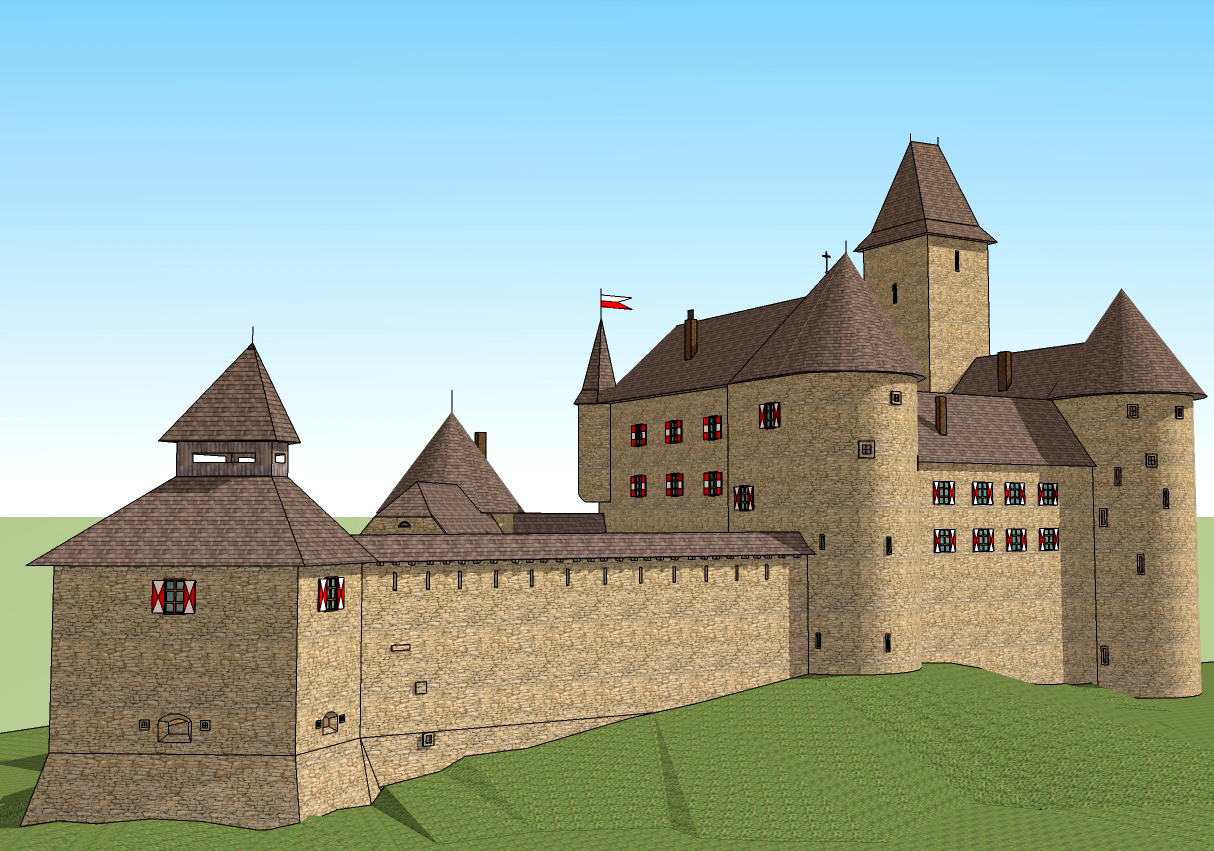
3d reconstruction of Samobor Castle

In the third decade of the 16th century, reshaping of the castle began, which was done by a gradual expansion of the core towards the north. The fortification thus became an elongated trapezoidal courtyard surrounded by a strong defensive wall and with a pentagonal tower on its ends. Throughout 17th and 18th century, the castle was upgraded and reconstructed. The last building inside the fortress was a three-storey house on its southern side, which along with castle's upper parts forms a courtyard. Its facades are divided by Tuscan columned porches, and its interior is rich with the equipment. This move transformed a castle from its original fortificational function into a countryside baroque styled castle. Last residents left the castle in the end of the 18th century, which triggered the gradual castle's decadence into a shape that it is today.

=== Rulers and owners ===
The first known owners of the castle were family of Babonić, after who, Samobor Castle came under ownership of Hungarian-Croatian kings. During the 15th century the castle became property of Counts of Celje. At the beginning of the 16th century, Castle came into a possession of feudal family Frankopan. After that, the castle changed many owners, Counts; Tržac, Tahy, Auersperg, Kiepach. The last owners of the castle, who actually lived in it, were Counts of Erdödy-Kulmer. Samobor's municipal government decided to purchase the castle from its previous owner - Montecuccoli family in 1902. From that point on, the castle with its surrounding served as a local picnic place.

== Restoration ==
Nowadays, Samobor Castle is just a picturesque ruin above Vugrinščak creek in Samobor city centre. Even though a project of castle restoration exists, only the chapel walls were renovated so far. In its restoration, the stones of the ruined castle parts, cement and slaked lime were used.

== Gallery ==
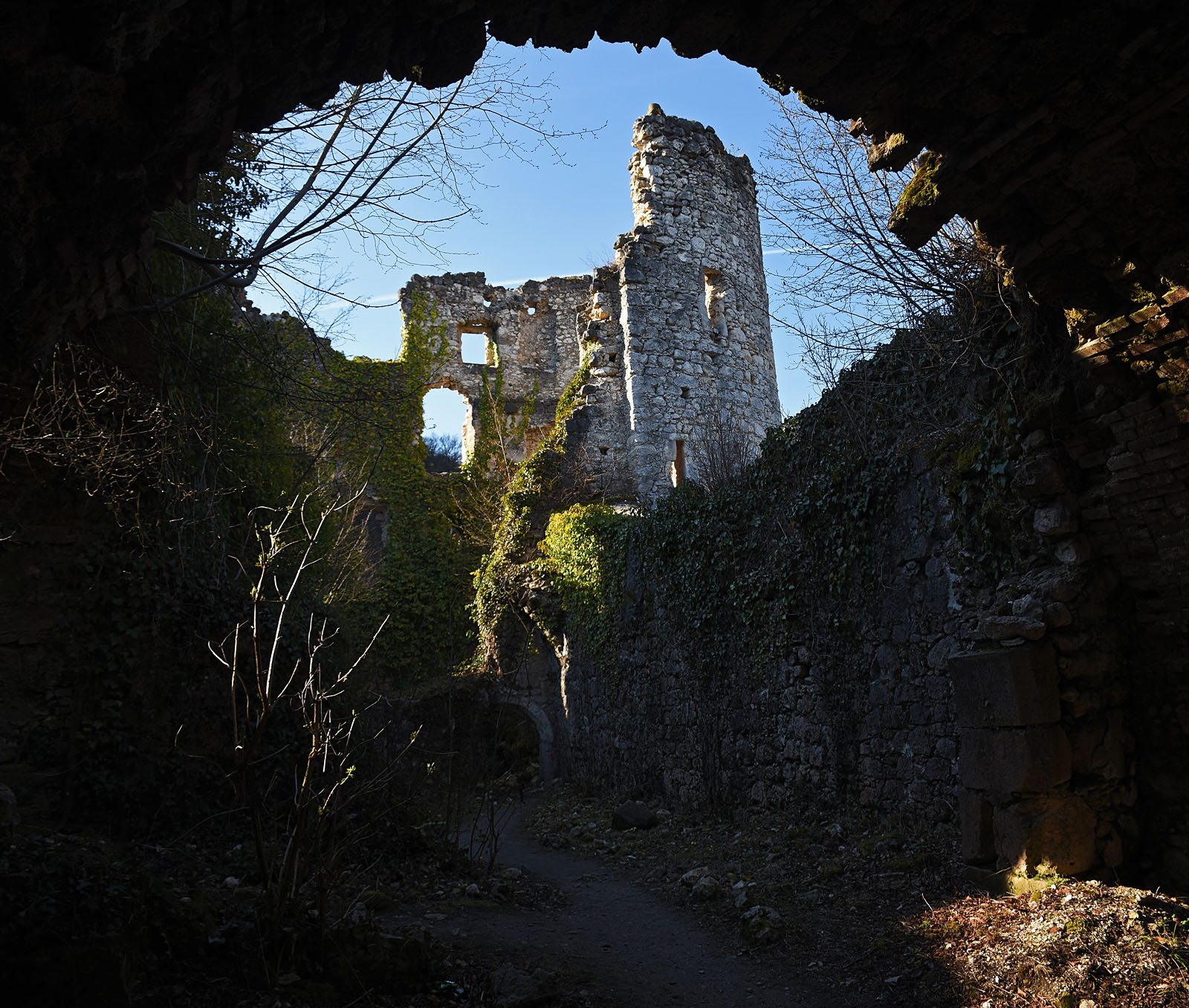
Exploring ruins

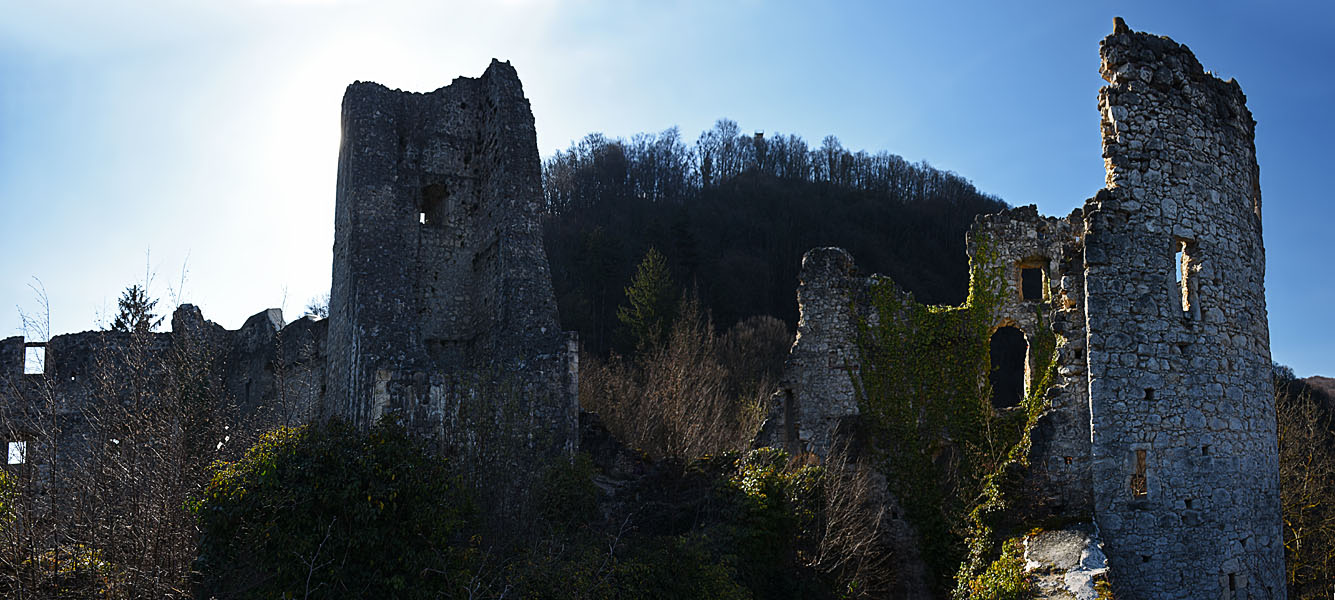
Impressive ruins

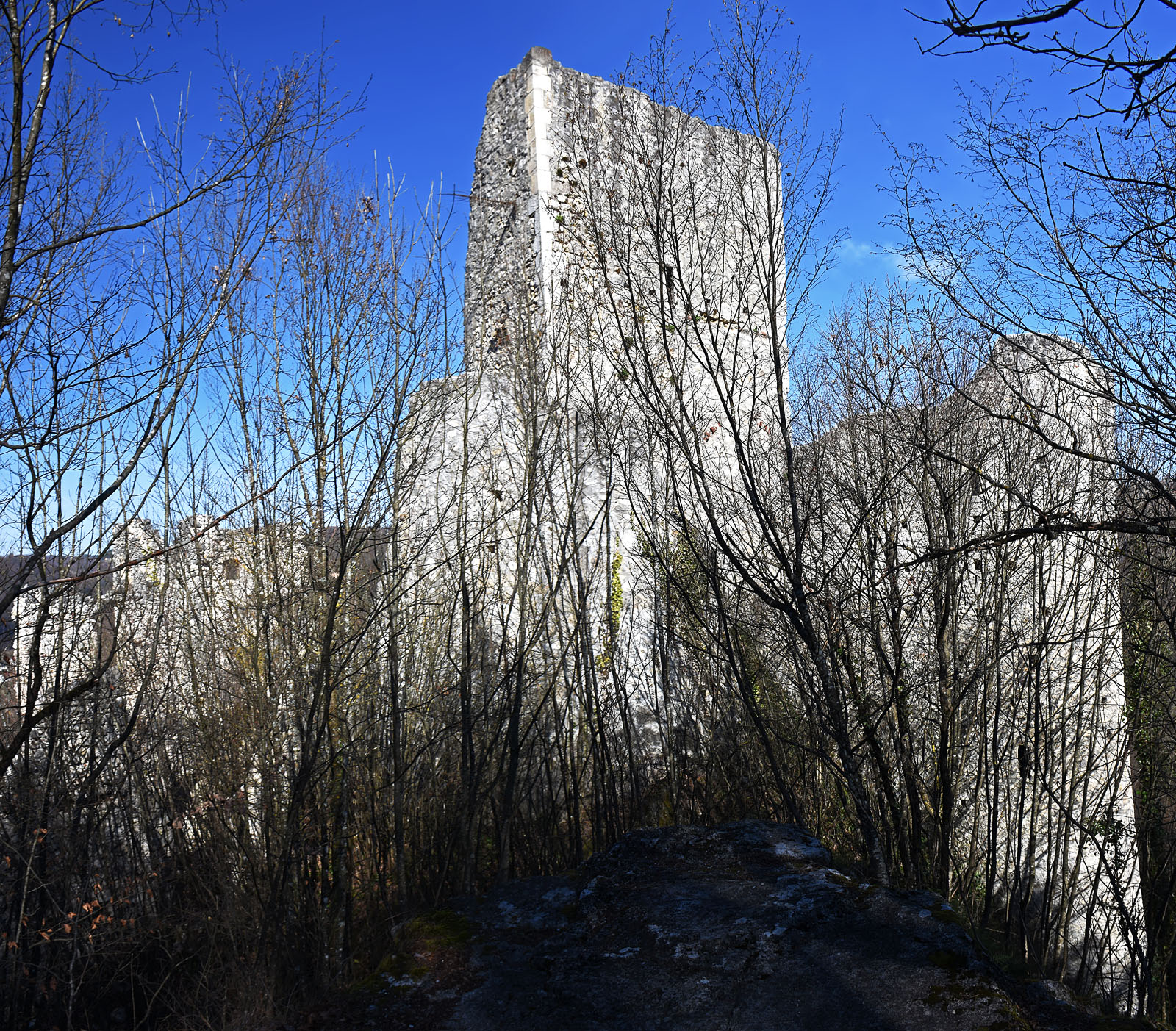
Overgrown
