= Burgruine Hartneidstein =

Castle ruins in Austria

Coordinates: 46°47′07″N 14°54′18″E

- Carinthia, Austria
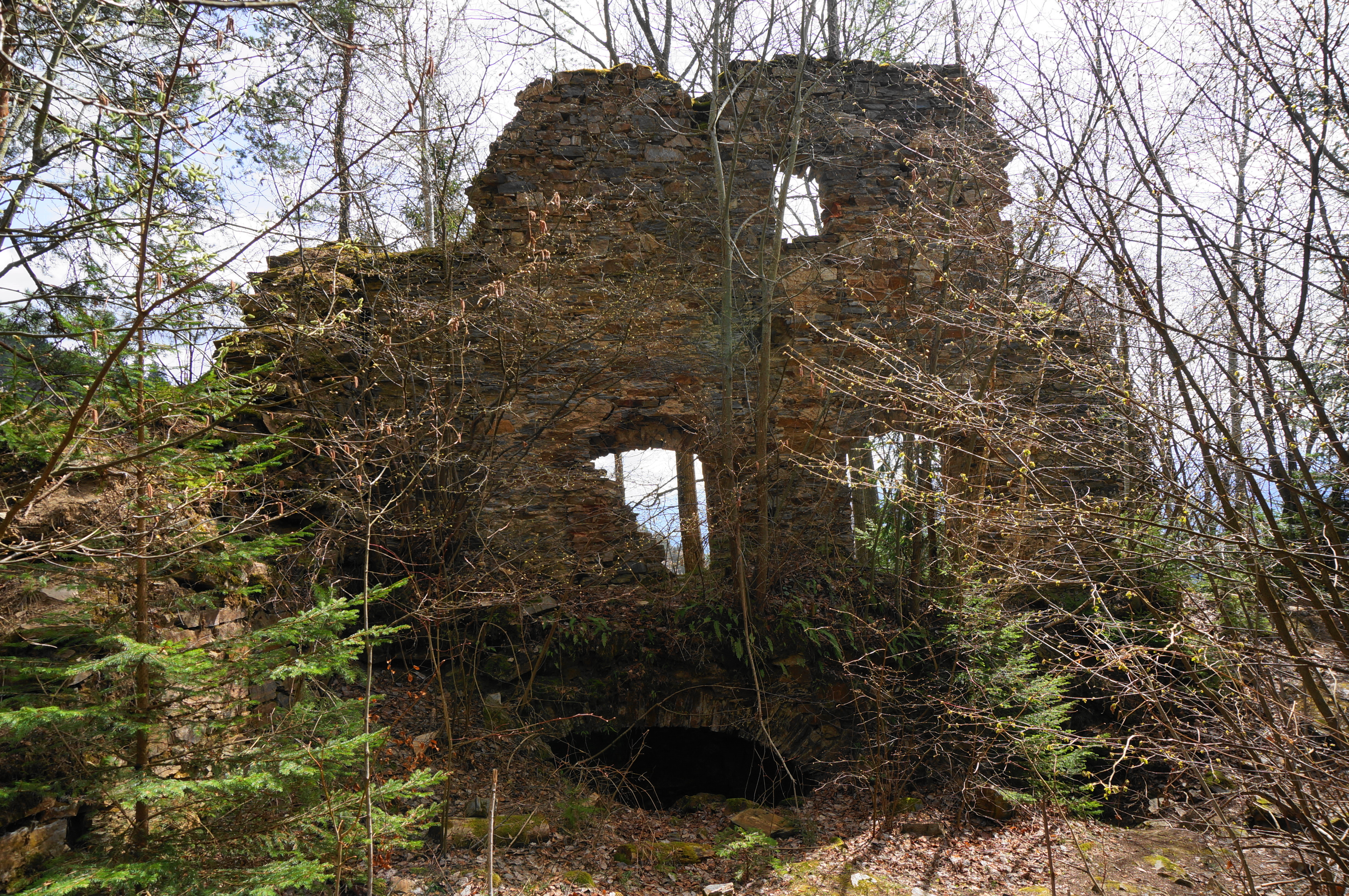
- Ruins of Burgruine Hartneidstein in 2018

Site information
- Type: Hilltop castle

Site history
- Built: Around 1300

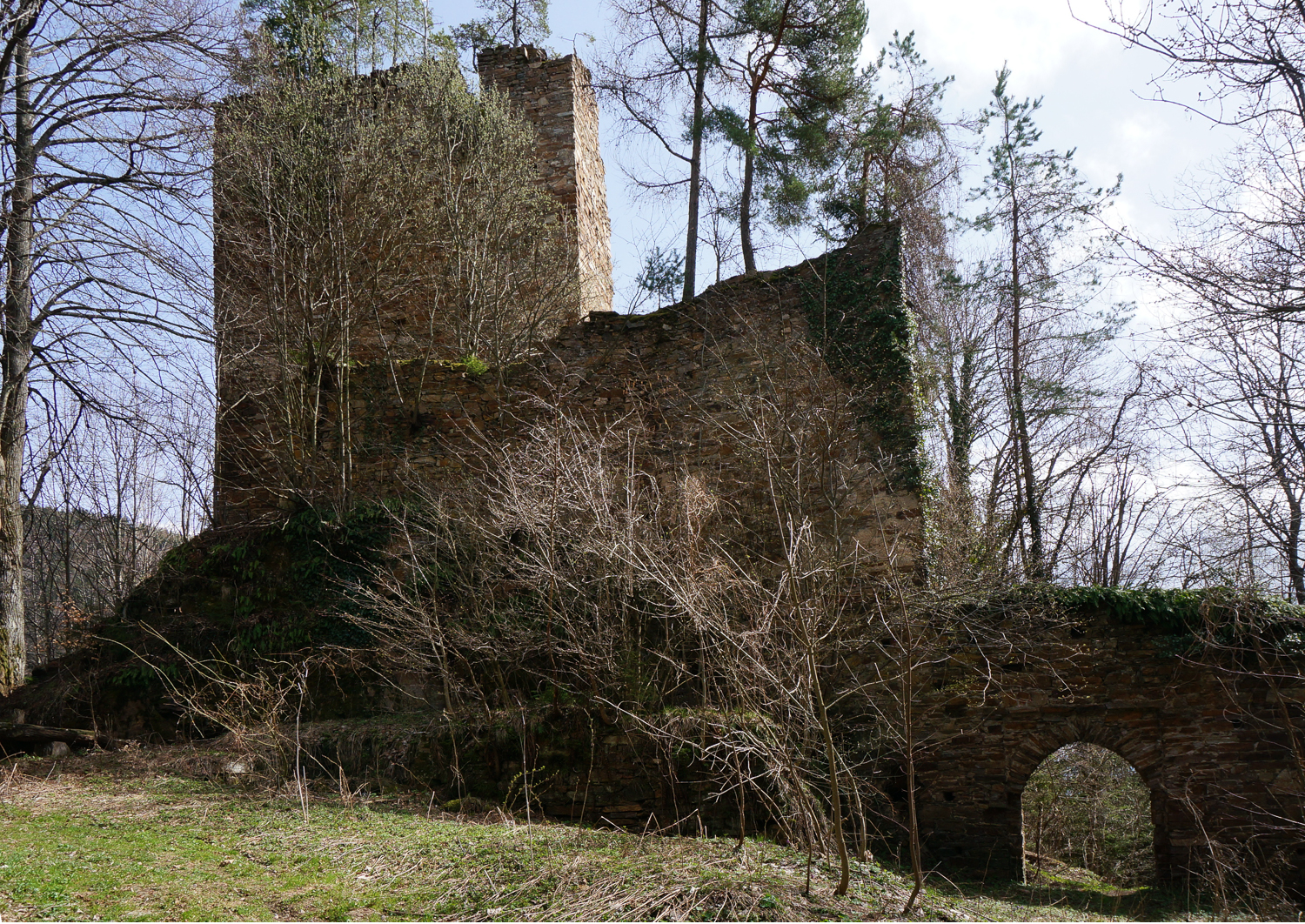
Ruins of Burgruine Hartneidstein in 2018

Burgruine Hartneidstein is a ruinous castle in Carinthia, Austria. It was built around 1300. Various outbuildings were burnt down in the 16th century by Ottoman raiding parties during the Ottoman–Habsburg wars, but the castle itself was left undamaged. The last time it was maintained was when the keep was re-roofed in 1724, and it fell into disrepair sometime thereafter. By 1825 it was ruinous.

== See also ==
- List of castles in Austria
