= Drnovo =

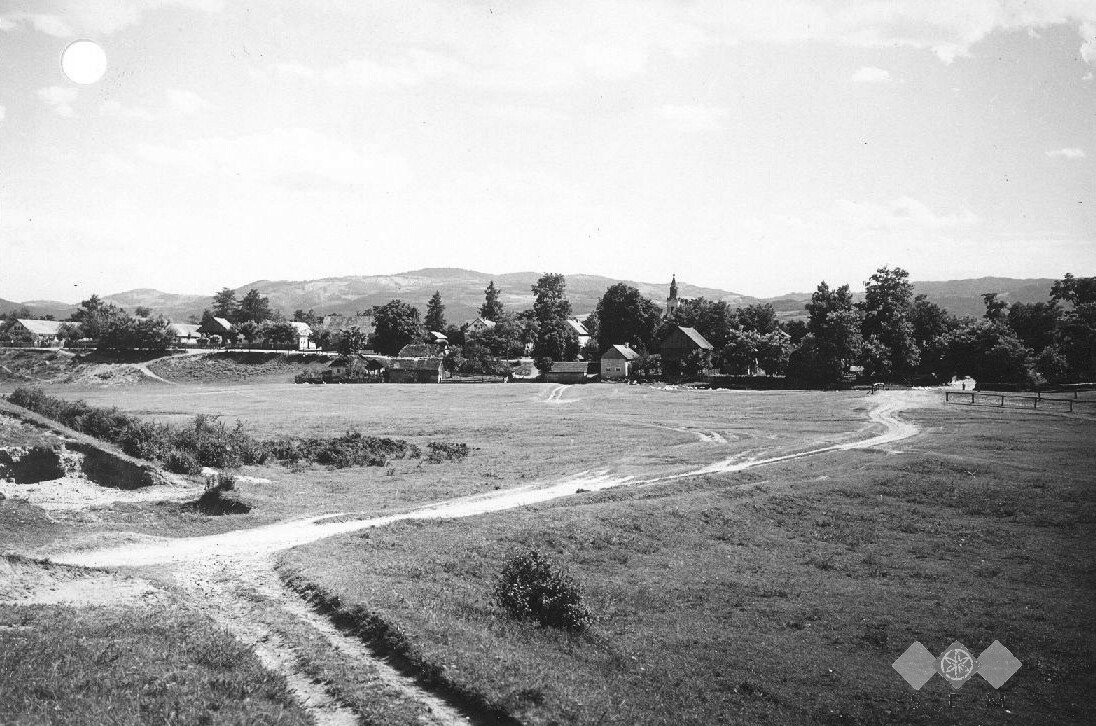
- Postcard of Drnovo

- Location in Slovenia
- Coordinates: 45°55′10.9″N 15°28′53.03″E
- Country: Slovenia
- Traditional region: Lower Carniola
- Statistical region: Lower Sava
- Municipality: Krško

Area
  - Total: 2.99 km^{2} (1.15 sq mi)
- Elevation: 154.7 m (508 ft)

Population (2002)
  - Total: 392
- Website: http://www.drnovo.si

Drnovo (pronounced [dəɾˈnɔːʋɔ] or [dəɾˈnoːʋɔ]; German: Dernowo) is a village south of Leskovec in the City Municipality of Krško in eastern Slovenia. It lies just north of the motorway from Ljubljana to Zagreb.

The area is part of the traditional region of Lower Carniola. It is now included with the rest of the municipality in the Lower Sava Statistical Region.

The local church is dedicated to John the Baptist and belongs to the Parish of Leskovec pri Krškem. It is a Baroque building from the 17th century. Its belfry was made higher in 1907.

== History ==
=== Neviodunum ===
Drnovo is the site of the Ancient Roman town of Neviodunum. It was a settlement of the Celtic tribe Latobici and in AD 79 it was granted municipal rights and became Municipium Flavium Latobicorum Neviodunum. It had an excellent location as a river port on the Sava River along the main Roman road connecting Emona and Siscia. The settlement was abandoned in the late 4th or early 5th century. Remains of the settlement, the port, roads, and thermae have been excavated and are now an open-air museum.
