= House of Buzzaccarini =

Buzzaccarini
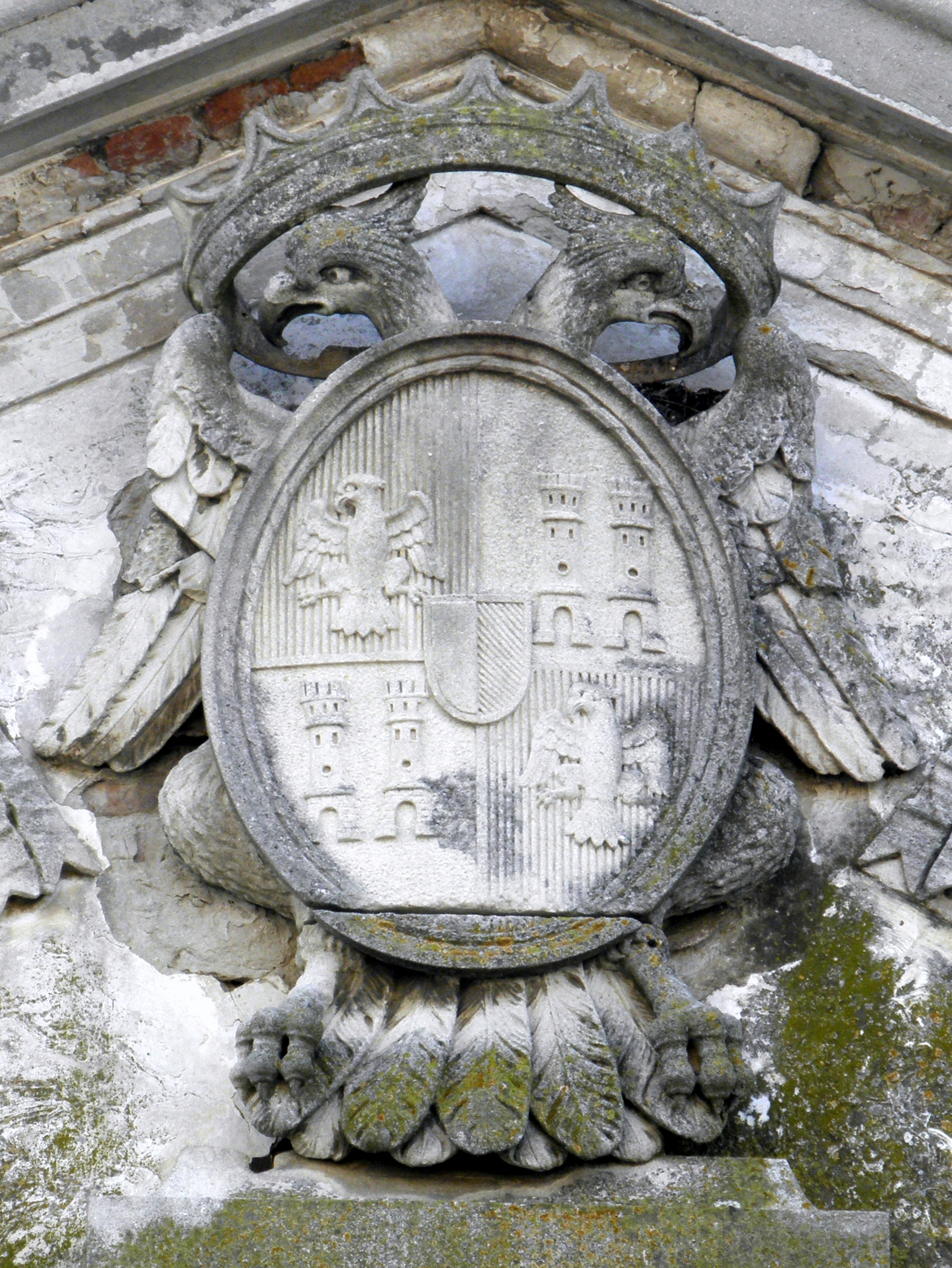
- Titles: Marquis

The House of Buzzaccarini is an ancient Italian noble family from Padua that had a notable role in the history of the Republic of Venice.

== History ==
The family has early medieval origins framed in the 8th century AD.

In 1053 they were already documented in the city of Padua. In the XII-XIII they related to the Carraresi and the Ezzelini da Romano, exercising political power and contributing to the artistic and cultural development of the city starting from the Pre-Renaissance era. They were responsible for the commission of the cycle of frescoes in the Baptistery of the Padua Cathedral and the construction of the Church of the Santa Maria dei Servi. In the fifteenth century, they dressed in the dress of Malta and eventually obtained the titles of Marquis and Marquis of San Raffaele. In 1571 they fought until victory as jail commanders in Lepanto in aid of the Republic of Venice. At the end of the Republic of Venice, a branch purchased in the title of Venetian patrician.

== Notable members ==
- Pataro Buzzaccarini (1300 – 1361) was an Italian nobleman, politician and military man. He inherited the titles and command of the house as the firstborn upon the death of his father in 1351. Not to be confused with:
- Pataro Buzzaccarini condottiere of the venetian galley "Re Attila", from Padua, in the Battle of Lepanto in 1571.

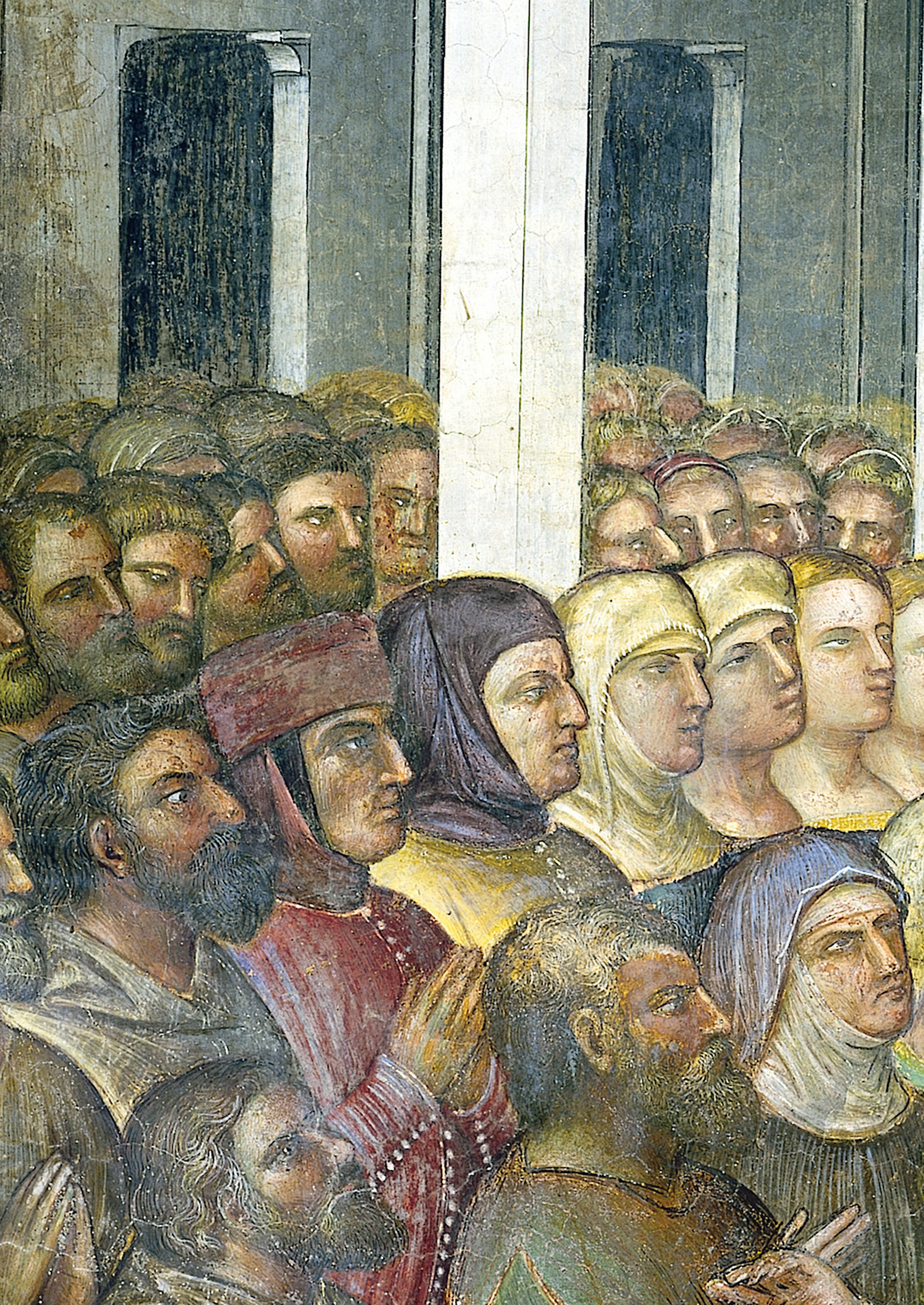
Detail of I miracoli di Cristo. Fina Buzzaccarini alongside her husband Francesco I da Carrara and Italian poet Francesco Petrarca.

- Fina Buzzaccarini (1328 – 1378) was an Italian noblewoman who married Francesco I da Carrara. Giusto de' Menabuoi portrayed her in the fresco I miracoli di Cristo s at the Baptistery of the Padua Duomo.
