= Krško Castle =

Historic site in Slovenia

Coordinates: 45°58′20.44″N 15°28′53.98″E

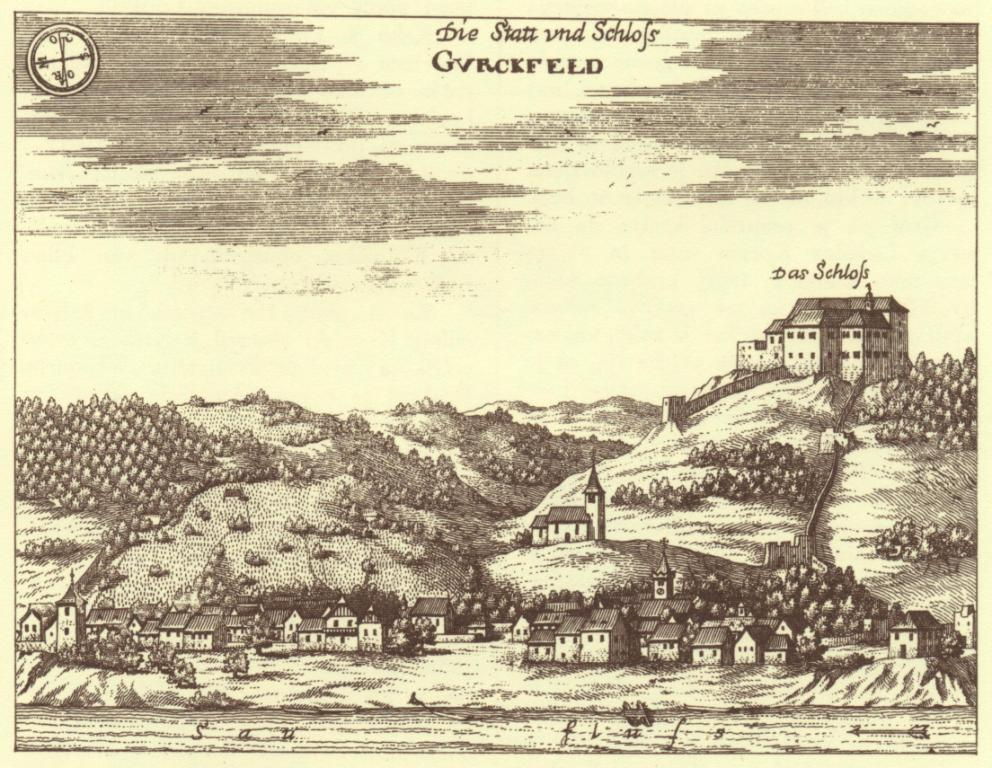
Krško Castle: 1689 engraving in Valvasor's The Glory of the Duchy of Carniola

Krško Castle (Slovene: Grad Krško, German: Schloss Gurckfeld) is a 12th-century castle ruin to the right of the Sava above the old center of the town of Krško, southeastern Slovenia. It stands in the territory of the settlement of Cesta. The castle and town are both named after the nearby Krka River.

== History ==
Krško (together with Brestanica) was first mentioned in 895, when the Emperor Arnulf of Carinthia gave it to a loyal retainer, Valtun. It is not known whether the castle existed at that time, but it is assumed that it was erected shortly after 1100 by the noble house of Bogen, whose ministeriales were recorded as holding it as of 1154. The Counts Bogen may have obtained the lordship by marriage of Bertold II of Bogen to Seuhard, sister of Count Popo of Carniola.

In 1189, the castle was mentioned as Castrum Gurkeuelt, under the Bogen ministeriale Ortolf. In that year Adalbert of Bogen pawned it to Archbishop of Salzburg Adalbert III, a relative of his wife, for 800 Freising marks. A term of two years was set for the Bogens to redeem it; the money may have gone toward their participation in the Third Crusade.

The castle was still intact as of the late 17th century, when it was depicted in Valvasor's 1689 The Glory of the Duchy of Carniola.

== Sources ==
- Ivan Jakič, Vsi slovenski gradovi, DZS, Ljubljana, 1997. COBISS 65569024
- Ivan Lapajne, Krško in Krčani (reprint of 1894 issue), Zavod Neviodunum Krško, Krško, 2004. COBISS 213741056
- Johann Weikhard von Valvasor, Slava vojvodine Kranjske, Mladinska knjiga, Ljubljana, 1978, Kultura imprint. COBISS 1102110
