= Leskovec pri Krškem =

Leskovec pri Krškem Leskovec (until 1953)
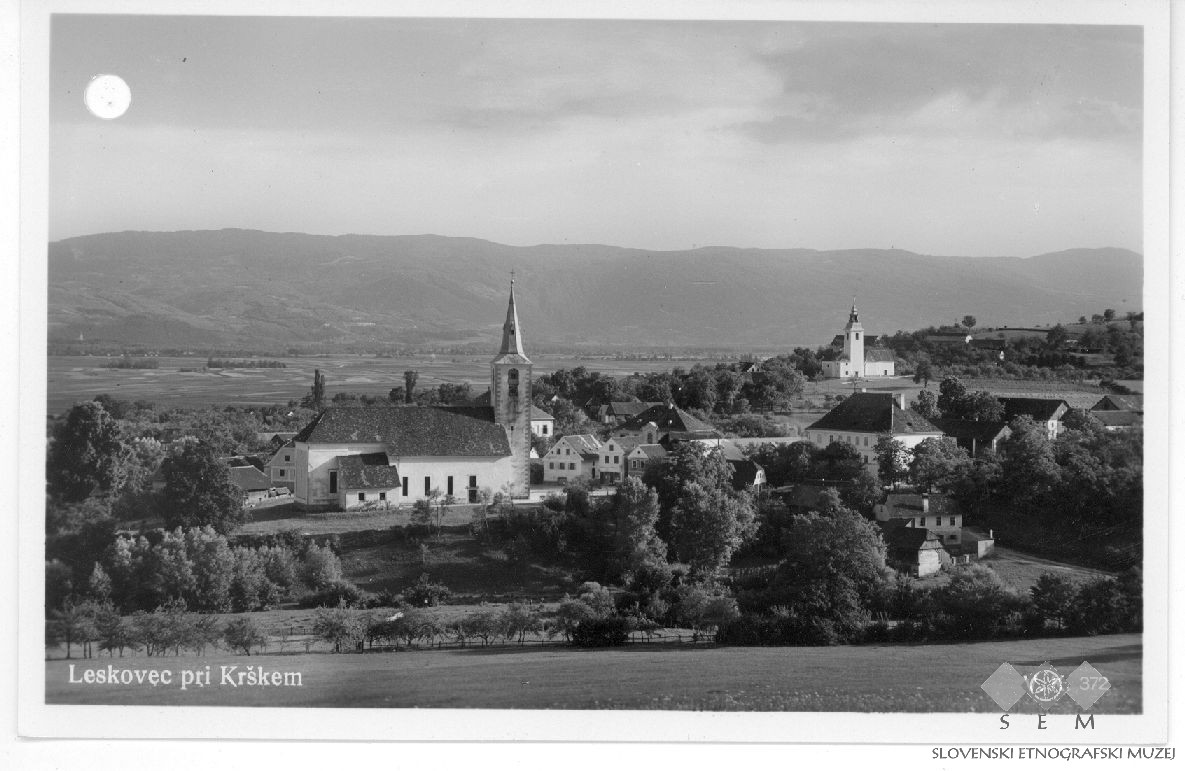

- Location in Slovenia
- Coordinates: 45°56′17.48″N 15°28′19.2″E
- Country: Slovenia
- Traditional region: Lower Carniola
- Statistical region: Lower Sava
- Municipality: Krško

Area
  - Total: 4.74 km^{2} (1.83 sq mi)
- Elevation: 209.9 m (689 ft)

Population (2002)
  - Total: 1,000

Leskovec pri Krškem (pronounced [lɛˈskɔːʋəts pɾi ˈkəɾʃkɛm] or [lɛˈskoːʋəts pɾi ˈkəɾʃkɛm]; German: Haselbach) is a settlement on the right bank of the Sava River in the City Municipality of Krško in eastern Slovenia. The area is part of the traditional region of Lower Carniola. It is now included with the rest of the municipality in the Lower Sava Statistical Region. It includes the hamlets of Grad (a.k.a. Turnska graščina), Beli Breg, Veliki Marof (in older sources also Gorenji Marof, German: Obermeierhof), and Žadovinka. Older sources also mention the appertaining hamlet of Bajer (German: Weiher).

== Name ==
The name of the settlement was changed from Leskovec to Leskovec pri Krškem in 1953. In the past the German name was Haselbach.

== Landmarks ==
=== Churches ===
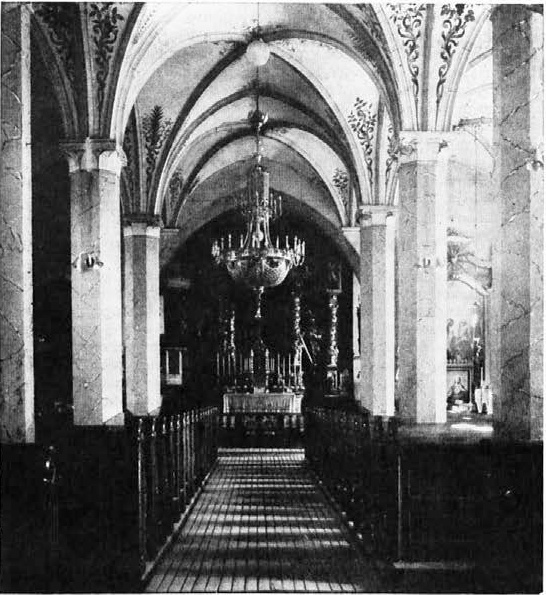
Interior of the parish church

==== Parish church ====
The local parish church is dedicated to Our Lady of Sorrows and belongs to the Roman Catholic Diocese of Novo Mesto. It was erected in the early Renaissance style on the site of an earlier building, most probably in the 1630s. A Roman tombstone is included in the walls of the church and a milliarium of Septimius Severus is next to the church.

==== St. Anne's Church ====
A second church in the settlement is dedicated to Saint Anne and is a 17th-century building that was rebuilt in the late 18th century in a Late Baroque style.

=== Monuments ===
In front of the parish church stands a monument to the soldiers fallen in World War I. It was made by Franjo Kunovar Jr. and unveiled on 3 June 1928. In 1995 a plaque dedicated to the people exiled in World War II was added to it.

=== Leskovec Castle ===
On a hill to the north of the settlement stands Leskovec Castle, dating to the 15th century with 16th- and 18th-century alterations.

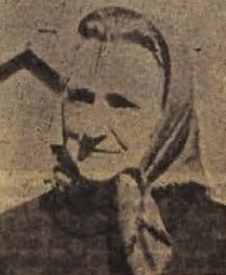
Poet Anka Salmič in 1967

== Notable people ==
- Anka Salmič (1902–1969), Slovenian farmer, folk healer and poet; she lived there for last ten years of her life.
