= Francesco I da Carrara =

Lord of Padua from 1350 to 1388

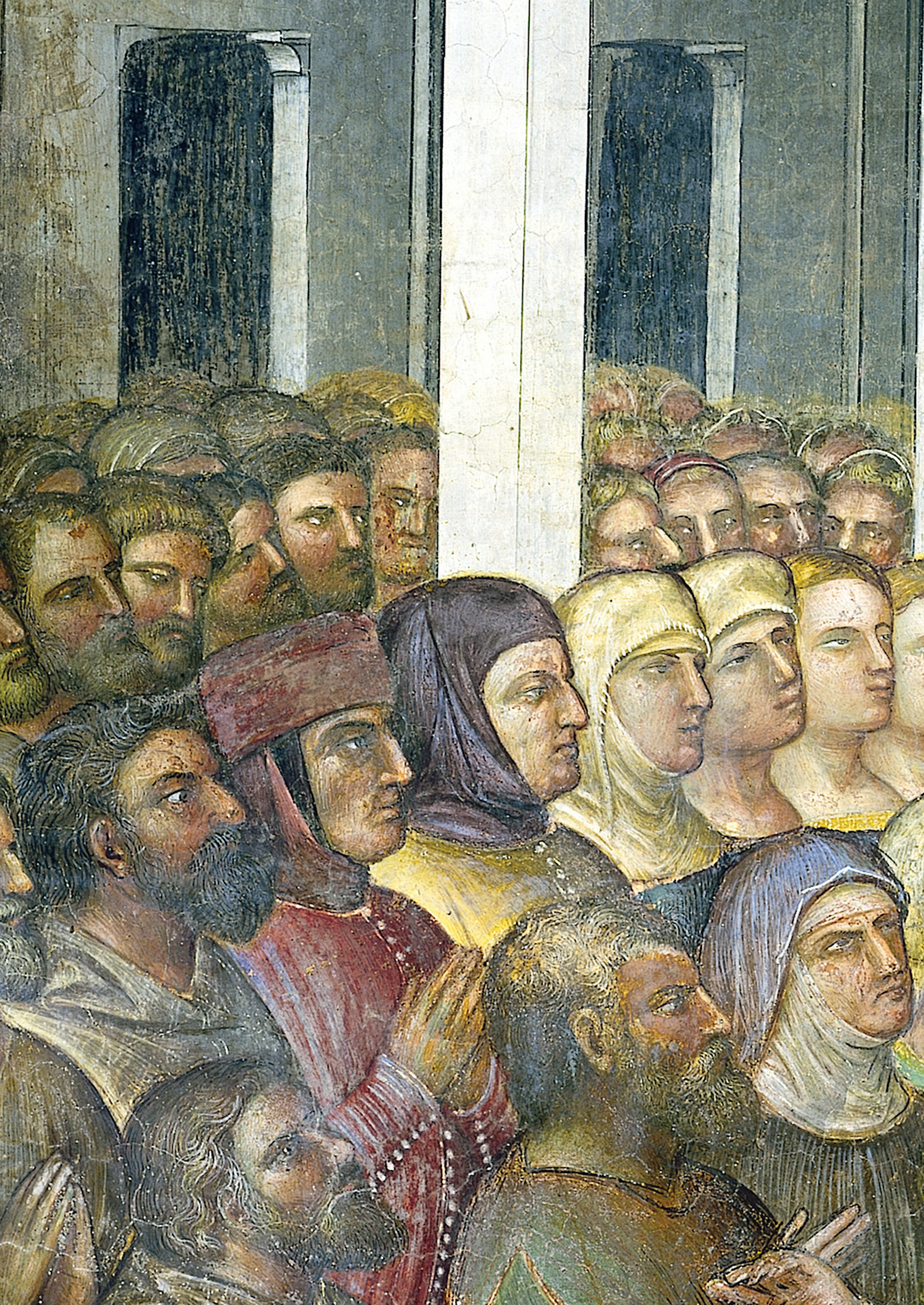
Padua Cathedral, Baptistery, Giusto de' Menabuoi - Detail of I miracoli di Cristo - Francesco I da Carrara with Francesco Petrarca and his wife Fina Buzzaccarini.

Francesco I da Carrara (29 September 1325, in Padua – 6 October 1393, in Monza), called il Vecchio, was Lord of Padua from 1350 to 1388.

The son of the assassinated Giacomo II da Carrara, he succeeded him as lord of Padua by popular acclamation. In 1356 he was named imperial vicar by emperor Charles IV. In 1360 he obtained by Louis I of Hungary the cities of Feltre and Belluno with their territories, as well as Valsugana, which controlled the trades to Trentino. In 1372-1373 he fought a fruitless war against his powerful neighbor, the Republic of Venice. In 1375-1381 he sided with the Genoa in the War of Chioggia, after which he obtained by Leopold III of Austria the city of Treviso.

In 1385, he allied with the Visconti of Milan against the Scaliger of Verona. In 1387 the Paduan troops, led by John Hawkwood and his son Francesco Novello, defeated the Scaliger troops in the Battle of Castagnaro. The following year, however, Venice and Milan formed a coalition against Francesco, who was forced to abdicate in favour of his son and to go into exile in Lombardy. Later Gian Galeazzo Visconti transferred him first to Como, and then to the Forni jail of Monza, where he died in 1393.

Francesco was a patron of the arts. He favored the University of Padua, where he called Ubaldo degli Ubaldi. He was also a friend of Francesco Petrarca, whom he donated an estate in Arquà.

He married Fina Buzzaccarini and their daughter Cecilia of Carrara (d. 1435) married Wenceslaus I, Duke of Saxe-Wittenberg. His other daughter, Caterina, married the Croatian count Stephen II of Frankopan, lord of Krk: their only surviving daughter Elizabeth married Frederick II, Count of Celje. After the death of Francesco's grandson Marsilio, the offspring of those two marriages remained Francesco's only surviving legitimate male descendants. None of them is known to have claimed the Carraresi inheritance.

== Sources ==
- Kohl, Benjamin G. (1977). "CARRARA, Francesco da, il Vecchio". Dizionario Biografico degli Italiani (in Italian). Vol. 20: Carducci–Carusi. Rome: Istituto dell'Enciclopedia Italiana. ISBN 978-88-12-00032-6.
- Kohl, Benjamin G. (1998). Padua under the Carrara, 1318–1405. Baltimore and London: Johns Hopkins University Press. ISBN 0-8018-5703-1.

Preceded by Giacomo II	Lord of Padua; 1350–1388	Succeeded by Francesco Novello
