= Counts of Celje =

Noble family

Coat of arms of Ulrich II of Celje

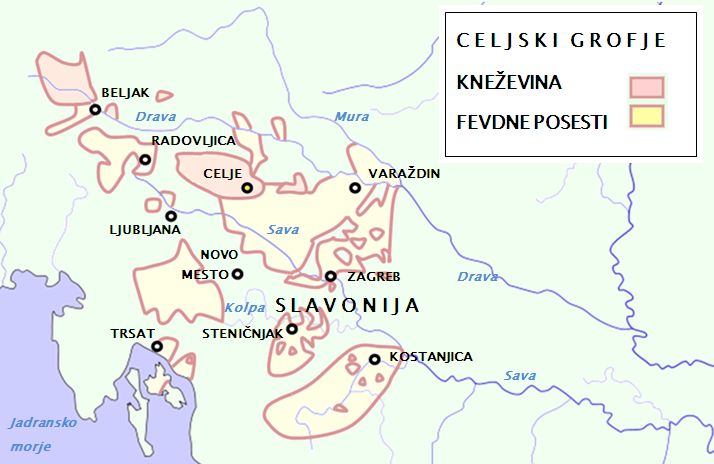
Territory of Counts of Celje in mid-15th century

The Counts of Celje (Slovene: Celjski grofje) or the Counts of Cilli (German: Grafen von Cilli; Hungarian: cillei grófok; Croatian: Celjski grofovi) were the most influential late medieval noble dynasty on the territory of present-day Slovenia. Risen as vassals of the Habsburg dukes of Styria in the early 14th century, they ruled the County of Cilli as immediate counts (Reichsgrafen) from 1341. They soon acquired a large number of feudal possessions also in today's Croatia and Bosnia. They rose to Princes of the Holy Roman Empire in 1436. The dynasty reached its peak with Ulrich II of Cilli, but with his death in 1456 they also died out, and after a war of succession, the Habsburgs inherited their domains.

== History ==
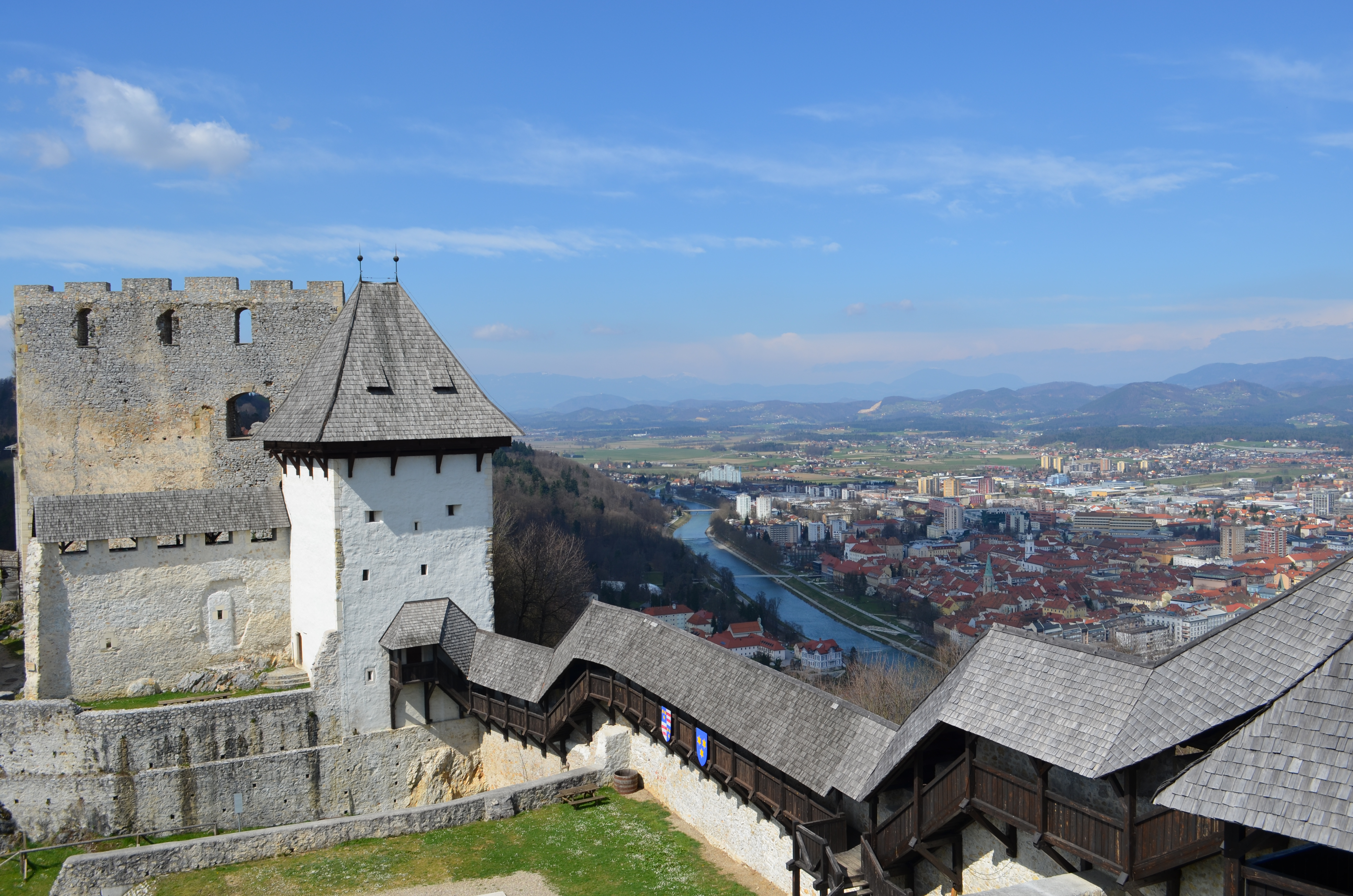
Celje Castle

The Lords of Sanneck (Žovnek) Castle on the Sann (Savinja) river in Lower Styria were first mentioned around 1123/30. Their ancestors may have been relatives of Saint Hemma of Gurk (d. 1045), who held large estates in the area. The fortress was allegedly already built under the rule of Charlemagne as a stronghold against the Avars.

=== Counts ===
One Leopold of Sanneck appeared as a supporter of the Habsburg king Rudolf I of Germany in the 1278 Battle on the Marchfeld. In the early 14th century, the Lords of Sanneck allied with the Austrian Habsburgs in their conflict against Duke Henry VI of Carinthia around the Kingdom of Bohemia, making them Habsburg vassals in 1308. Leopold's brother Frederick by marriage inherited the large possessions of the late Counts of Heunburg in 1322; the Celje estates became a property of the dynasty in 1333, not before years of feuds with Count Ulrich V of Pfannberg and other rival noble dynasties. Frederick finally prevailed with the support of Otto the Merry, the Habsburg duke of Styria. He became governor of Carniola and the Windic March in 1332 and was elevated to comital status by Emperor Louis IV in 1341 at Munich, receiving the title Cylie or Cilli derived from Celje Castle.

The Counts of Celje soon owned more than 20 castles spread over the territory of modern Slovenia and beyond through the marriages of their daughters. By acquiring large estates in the adjoining duchies of Styria and Carinthia, in the March of Carniola as well as in the territories of the Hungarian Crown (including Croatia and Slavonia), their influence rose and they became one of the most powerful families in the area. Count Ulrich I of Cilli, a leader of mercenary soldiers, joined King Louis I of Hungary on his 1354 campaign into Dalmatia and, shortly afterwards, accompanied the Rex Romanorum Charles IV to his coronation at Rome. His son William married Anna of Poland, daughter of the Polish king Casimir III the Great. The Counts of Cilli were related by marriage with rulers of Bosnia and Polish and Hungarian kings. Through Barbara of Cilli the Counts were also in kinship with the royalty of Bohemia.

=== Imperial princes ===
Their rapid rise continued after the 1396 Battle of Nicopolis against the Ottoman Empire, where Count Hermann II of Cilli saved the life of King Sigismund of Hungary, the son of the late Emperor Charles IV. As a reward, the king donated (1397–99) the city of Varaždin, the county of Zagorje, Međimurje region and many estates in Croatia to the family. In 1401, the Counts of Cilli were among Sigismund's supporters against the rebellious Hungarian magnates. Their alliance with the Imperial House of Luxembourg became even closer through the marriage of Hermann's daughter Barbara of Cilli to the king in 1405. In 1418, Count Hermann II inherited the Carinthian and Carniolan estates of the extinct Counts of Ortenburg, which was subsequently administered by his vassal Andreas von Graben zu Sommeregg.

In 1410, Sigismund had been elected King of the Romans and was crowned Holy Roman Emperor in 1433. In 1436 he elevated the Counts of Cilli to the rank of Princes of the Holy Roman Empire (although they retained their title of Graf (Slovene: grof)). The Habsburgs, whose strongest rivals they had become, reacted with a war that lasted until 1443, when an agreement of mutual inheritance was signed.

Count Ulrich II of Cilli was the most powerful member of the Cilli family. In 1432 he married Catherine, daughter of the Serbian despot Đurađ Branković. Ulrich held a large influence in many courts, which originated from the relationships the Cilli family had made in the past. Upon the death of the Habsburg king Albert II in 1439, he tried to get regency of Hungary, Bohemia and Austria through control over Albert's minor son Ladislaus the Posthumous. With such ambitions he got many opponents and rivals, such as the Hungarian Hunyadi family, Friderick, the Archduke of Styria and Carinthia (Albert's cousin, later emperor Friderick III.) and George of Podebrad. After an unsuccessful claim to the Bosnian crown, Cilli obtained some territories in Croatia and Slavonia and in 1452 finally succeeded in forcing Emperor Frederick III to hand over the boy king Ladislaus to his keeping. Thus, Ulrich II became de facto regent of Hungary.

=== Decline ===
In 1456 after the death of his rival John Hunyadi, Ulrich II succeeded him as Captain General of Hungary. That initiated a plot by the Hunyadi family against Ulrich II, and he was assassinated by the men of John Hunyadi's son Ladislaus on 8 November in Belgrade.

With the death of Ulrich II the male line of the Counts of Cilli died out, and after a war of succession all of their estates and property were handed over to the Habsburgs on the basis of the inheritance agreement.

== Legacy ==
Part of their coat of arms - the three golden stars on a blue background, which, as Lords of Sanneck, they had inherited from the once powerful Carinthian Counts of Heunburg in 1322 - was incorporated into the Emblem of Yugoslavia in 1920s and the Slovenian coat of arms in 1991. It is also the current coat of arms of Celje.

== Lords of Sanneck or Barons of Soune, Counts of Cilli ==
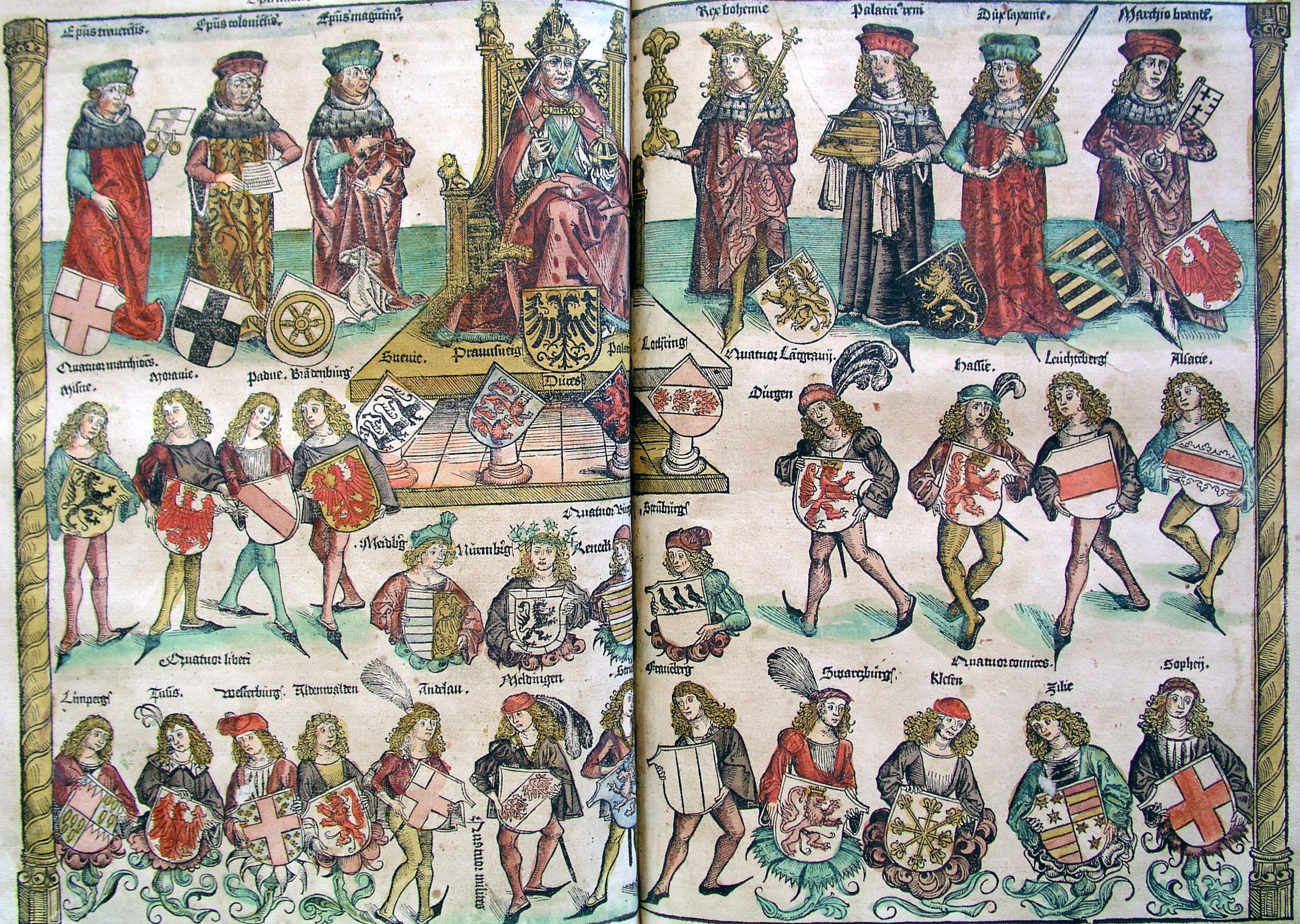
Counts of Cilli (bottom row, second right) in the structure of the Holy Roman Empire

The Lords of Sanneck (Žovnek) or Barons of Soune

- Gebhard (c. 1130–1144)
- Gebhard II (1173–1227)
- Conrad I (died c. 1255)
- Ulrich I of Sanneck (died c. 1265)
- Ulrich II of Sanneck (died c. 1316), married Countess Catherine of Heunburg, heir to the count Ulrich II of Heunburg and his wife Agnes of Baden
- Frederick I (c. 1300–1359/60), son, from 1341 Count of Celje

Counts of Cilli (Celje)

- Ulrich I (1331–1368), son of Frederick I, Captain in Carniola, married Countess Adelheid of Ortenburg
- Herman I (1332/34–1385), son of Frederick I, married Catherine, daughter of Ban Stephen II of Bosnia
- William (1361/62–1392), son of Ulrich I, married Anna of Poland, daughter of King Casimir III the Great of Poland
  - Anna of Cilli (1380–1416), daughter, married King Władysław II Jagiełło of Poland
- Herman II (c. 1365–1435), son of Hermann I, Ban of Croatia and Dalmatia
  - Barbara of Cilli (c. 1390–1451), daughter, married King Sigismund of Hungary
  - Frederick II (died 1454), son of Hermann II, Prince in 1436, Ban of Slavonia, 1. wife Elizabeth of Frankopan, 2. wife Veronika of Desenice
    - Ulrich II (1407–1456), son, married Catherine of Branković
    - Kantakuzina Katarina Branković (1456–1458), widow of Ulrich.

In 1458 the county is annexed to Austria.

== See also ==
- List of rulers of Croatia
- Prince of the Holy Roman Empire
- List of feudal lords of Međimurje
