= County of Cilli =

Constituent state of the Holy Roman Empire in present-day Slovenia (1130–1456)

County of Celje Grafschaft Cilli
- Coat of arms

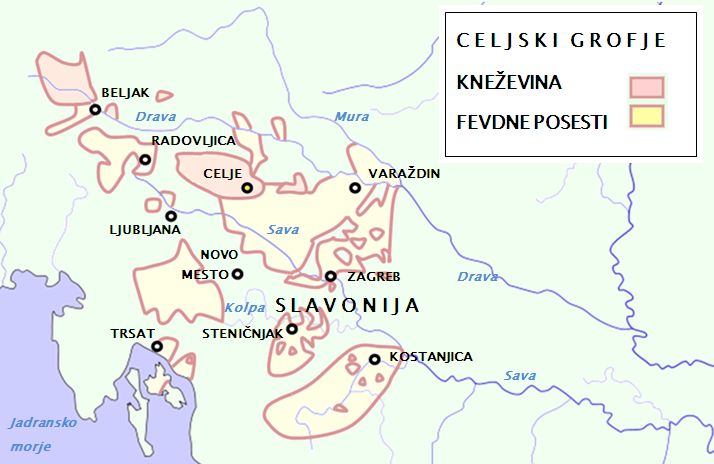
- Possessions in the 15th century Principality: Celje and Ortenburg (from 1418) Fiefs
- Status: County
- Capital: Celje
- Historical era: Late Middle Ages
  - First Mentioned: 1130 AD
  - Acquired Ortenburg: 1418
  - Count Ulrich II killed: 1456
Preceded by	Succeeded by
Duchy of Styria	Duchy of Styria

The County of Cilli (Slovene: Celje) was a county in present day Slovenia, first mentioned in 1130. It expanded rapidly from 1341 to 1456, with a notable war in 1436-1443; when Ulrich II died in 1456, the Habsburgs inherited them after a short succession war the same year.

== History ==
The County of Cilli was first mentioned in 1130, with the lord Gebhard owning Lamberg Castle and Žovnek Castle, in 1288 the Vovbrška family died out; in the inheritance treaty, Fridirik of Žovnek gained their estates in Savinija, Saleška and half of Cilli. In 1292, an anti-Habsburg rebellion began in Slovenia, with most lords joining on the side of the rebellion. However, those same lords mostly left in the same year, with only Cilli remaining in the war. The war ended in 1293; the winner is unknown, but was likely the Habsburg family.

In 1308, then-count Ulrich of Sanneck surrendered all of his estates to the Habsburgs, which they immediately gave back as a fiefdom. By 1325 Konrad Aufenstein, who owned the other half of Celje got all of the county, returning it again in 1333. In 1338, Cilli gained Helfenberg after they won a dispute. In 1339 the Helfenberg family died out; Frederick of Celje purchased Alhoh's lands in Helfenberg. In 1361 Hermann I gained for Cilli the area around Laško, Žalec, Slovenska Bistrica and Radgona, expanding this to include the Vuzenica family's lands in 1374—the same year that the Sentpavel Monastery was sold to them. By 1418, the County of Cilli had expanded significantly, Inheriting the declining Kunšperk family in 1403 and the Ortenburg family lands in 1418. After this year, their expansion greatly slowed within Slovenia, but they continued to gain estates and influence within Croatia, becoming Bans of Slavonia and Croatia likely by the 1440s, and certainly by 1456. That same year, the Counts of Cilli died out with Ulrich II dying at the hands of Hunyadi agents. Following a brief war of succession in the county, the Habsburgs emerged victorious and claimed the entire territory.
