= List of airports in Slovenia =

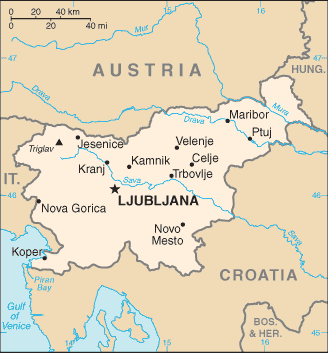
Map of Slovenia

This is a list of airports in Slovenia, grouped by type and sorted by location.

Slovenia, officially the Republic of Slovenia (Slovene: Republika Slovenija), is a country in Central Europe touching the Alps and bordering the Mediterranean. Slovenia borders Italy on the west, the Adriatic Sea on the southwest, Croatia on the south and east, Hungary on the northeast, and Austria on the north. The capital and largest city of Slovenia is Ljubljana. Slovenia covers an area of 20,271 square kilometres (7,827 sq mi) and has a population of about 2 million. The highest point of Slovenia is Mount Triglav at 2,864 metres (9,396 ft); the lowest point is the Adriatic Sea at sea level.

Slovenia has 3 civil IFR airports, one military air base, 12 VFR-only airports, and 40 airstrips.

== Airports ==
Airport names shown in bold indicate the airport has scheduled service on commercial airlines.

City served	ICAO	IATA	Airport name	Elevation	Runways	AIP / website
			**International airports**			
Ljubljana (Brnik)	LJLJ	LJU	**Ljubljana Jože Pučnik Airport**	388 m (1273 ft)	12/30: 3300 x 45 m (paved)	eAIP web
Maribor (Orehova vas)	LJMB	MBX	Maribor Edvard Rusjan Airport	267 m (876 ft)	15/33: 2500 x 45 m (paved); 15L/33R: 1200 x 60 m (unpaved)	eAIP web
Portorož (Sečovlje)	LJPZ	POW	Portorož Airport	2 m (7 ft)	15/33: 1200 x 30 m (paved)	eAIP web
			**Public national airports**			
Ajdovščina	LJAJ		Ajdovščina Airport	116 m (381 ft)	08/26: 1000 x 67 m (unpaved)	eAIP chart web
Bovec	LJBO		Bovec Airport	431 m (1414 ft)	07/25: 850 x 40 m (unpaved)	eAIP chart
Lesce/Bled	LJBL		Lesce-Bled Airport	504 m (1655 ft)	14/32: 1130 x 23 m (paved); 14L/32R 600 x 30 m (unpaved)	eAIP chart web
Celje (Levec)	LJCL		Celje Airport	244 m (801 ft)	11/29: 900 x 100 m (unpaved)	eAIP chart web
Divača	LJDI		Divača Airport	423 m (1388 ft)	13/31: 774 x 18 m (paved); 11/29: 750 x 40 m (unpaved)	eAIPweb
Murska Sobota	LJMS		Murska Sobota Airport	184 m (604 ft)	09/27:1015 x 76 m (unpaved); 01/19:850 x 52 m (unpaved)	eAIP chart web
Novo Mesto (Prečna)	LJNM		Novo Mesto-Prečna Airport	169 m (554 ft)	05/23: 2000 x 50 m (unpaved)	eAIP chart web
Postojna	LJPO		Postojna Airport	530 m (1738 ft)	02/20: 750 x 60 m (unpaved)	eAIP chart web
Ptuj (Moškanjci)	LJPT		Ptuj Airport	213 m (699 ft)	11/29: 1100 x 100 m (unpaved)	eAIP chart web
Slovenj Gradec	LJSG		Slovenj Gradec Airport	501 m (1644 ft)	14/32: 1200 x 23 m (paved); 14R/32L 650 x 30 m (unpaved)	eAIP chart web
Velenje/ Šoštanj (Lajše)	LJSO (formerly LJVE)		Šoštanj Airport	378 m (1240 ft)	15/33: 714 x 18 m (paved)	eAIP chart web
Slovenske Konjice (Loče)	LJSK		Slovenske Konjice Airport	275 m (902 ft)	16/34: 769 x 18 m (paved)	
			**Military airports**			
Cerklje ob Krki	LJCE		Cerklje ob Krki Air Base	153 m (503 ft)	09/27: 2400 x 50 m (paved); 09L/27R: 1100 x 30 m (unpaved)	eAIP
			**Airfields**			
Zagorje	/		Zagorje Airstrip	332 m (1090 ft)	04/22: 450 x 20 m (unpaved)	web
Ljubljana/Podpeč	/		Podpeč Airstrip	288 m (945 ft)	08/26: 500 x 15 m (unpaved)	web
Cerkvenjak	/		Cerkvenjak Airstrip	227 m (745 ft)	16/34: 650 x 25 m (unpaved)	manual
Šentvid pri Stični	/		Šentvid Airstrip	310 m (1017 ft)	14/32: 700 x 35 m (unpaved)	web
Podčetrtek	/		Imeno Airstrip	189 m (620 ft)	01/19: 610 x 50 m (unpaved)	web
Metlika/Črnomelj	/		Priložje Airstrip	168 m (551 ft)	04/22: 550 x 25 m (unpaved)	web
Lendava (Mostje)	/		Lendava Airstrip	161 m (528 ft)	14/32: 450 x 30 m (unpaved)	
Veržej / Banovci	/		Veržej Airstrip	179 m (587 ft)	04/22: 600 x 30 m (unpaved)	web

== See also ==
- Transport in Slovenia
- Slovenian Air Force and Air Defence
- List of airports by ICAO code: L#LJ – Slovenia
- Wikipedia: WikiProject Aviation/Airline destination lists: Europe#Slovenia
