= Podbukovje, Trebnje =

Podbukovje
- Location in Slovenia
- Coordinates: 45°52′52″N 14°54′10″E
- Country: Slovenia
- Traditional region: Lower Carniola
- Statistical region: Southeast Slovenia
- Municipality: Trebnje
- Elevation: 407 m (1,335 ft)

Podbukovje (pronounced [pɔdˈbuːkɔu̯jɛ], German: Podbukuje) is a former village in eastern Slovenia in the Municipality of Trebnje. It is now part of the village of Arčelca. It is part of the traditional region of Lower Carniola and is now included in the Southeast Slovenia Statistical Region.

== Geography ==
Podbukovje is located northwest of the village center of Arčelca. It is connected by a side road to Orlaka to the west. Birch Peak (Slovene: Brezov vrh, elevation: 537 meters or 1,762 feet) rises above the settlement to the southwest.

== History ==
Podbukovje was annexed by Arčelca in 1953, ending its existence as a separate settlement.
