= List of cities, towns, and villages in Slovenia: A =

This is a list of settlements in Slovenia, starting with A.

Settlement	Municipality
Abitanti	Koper
Adamovo	Velike Lašče
Adergas	Cerklje na Gorenjskem
Adlešiči	Črnomelj
Adrijanci	Gornji Petrovci
Ajba	Kanal ob Soči
Ajbelj	Kostel
Ajdovščina	Ajdovščina
Ajševica	Nova Gorica
Ambrož pod Krvavcem	Cerklje na Gorenjskem
Ambrus	Ivančna Gorica
Andol	Ribnica
Andraž nad Polzelo	Polzela
Andrejci	Moravske Toplice
Andrejčje	Bloke
Andrenci	Cerkvenjak
Anhovo	Kanal ob Soči
Ankaran	Ankaran
Anovec	Krško
Anže	Krško
Apače	Apače
Apače	Kidričevo
Apnenik pri Boštanju	Sevnica
Apnenik pri Velikem Trnu	Krško
Apnenik	Šentjernej
Apno	Cerklje na Gorenjskem
Arclin	Vojnik
Arčelca	Trebnje
Arčoni	Renče-Vogrsko
Ardro pod Velikim Trnom	Krško
Ardro pri Raki	Krško
Arja vas	Žalec
Armeško	Krško
Arnače	Velenje
Arnovo selo	Brežice
Artiče	Brežice
Artiža vas	Ivančna Gorica
Artmanja vas	Trebnje
Arto	Sevnica
Artviže	Hrpelje-Kozina
Avber	Sežana
Avče	Kanal ob Soči
Avguštine	Kostanjevica na Krki
Avsa	Kobarid
Aženski Vrh	Gornja Radgona
