= Highways in Slovenia =

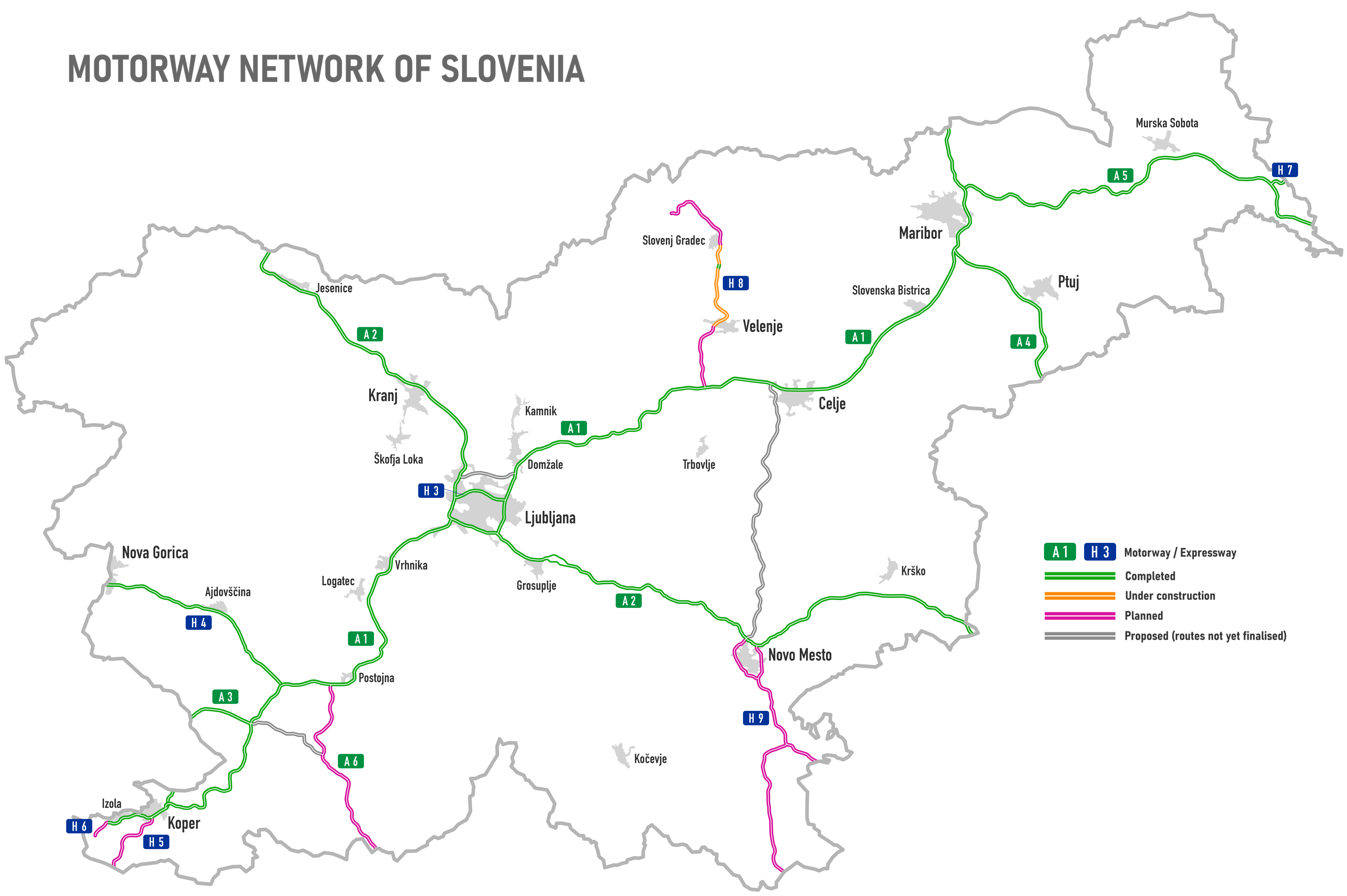
Motorways in Slovenia in 2026

The highways in Slovenia are the central state roads in Slovenia and are divided into motorways (Slovene: avtocesta, AC) and expressways (hitra cesta, HC). Motorways are dual carriageways with a speed limit of 130 kilometres per hour (81 mph). They have white-on-green road signs as in Italy, Croatia and other countries nearby. Expressways are secondary roads, also dual carriageways, usually without a hard shoulder. They have a speed limit of 110 kilometres per hour (68 mph) and have white-on-blue road signs.

Highways and accessory structures in Slovenia are managed by the state-owned Motorway Company in the Republic of Slovenia (Družba za avtoceste v Republiki Sloveniji, acronym DARS) established in 1994. As of August 2022, DARS manages and maintains 625 kilometres of motorways and expressways, 143 kilometres of ramps, 22 kilometres of junctions, 27 kilometres of rest areas and 41 kilometres of other roads. Since 1 June 2008, highway users in Slovenia are required to buy an electronic Vignette: 7-day, 1-month and annual passes are available.

== Motorways ==
No.	From	To	Length (km)	E-roads
	Šentilj (Austria)	Koper	245.3	
	Karawanks Tunnel (Austria)	Obrežje (Croatia)	175.5	
	Divača	Sežana (Italy)	12.3	
	Slivnica	Gruškovje (Croatia)	33.4	
	Dragučova	Pince (Hungary)	79.6	

== Expressways ==
No.	From	To	Length (km)
	Zadobrova	Koseze	10,2
	Razdrto	Vrtojba (Italy)	42.1
	Spodnje Škofije (Italy)	Koper	7.8
	Koper	Izola	5.2
	Dolga vas (interchange)	Dolga vas (border crossing) (Hungary)	3.5

== Planned ==
No.	Route		Total length (km)	Completed (km)	Under construction (km)	Note
No.	From	To	Total length (km)	Completed (km)	Under construction (km)	Note
	Postojna	Jelšane (Croatia)	37.5	0	0	Route not yet finalised.
	Spodnje Škofije (Italy)	Dragonja (Croatia)	21.6	7.8	0	Declassified to G-11 until full completion.
	Koper	Lucija	13.6	5.2	0	Declassified to G-111 until full completion.
	Šentrupert	Ravne na Koroškem	46.8	1.2	16.9	From Ravne to Prevalje planned as two-lane main road.
H9	Novo Mesto - east	Metlika (Croatia)	28.4	0	0	
H10	Gradnik	Črnomelj	20.0	0	0	Possible extension to Vinica.
H?	Novo Mesto - west	Novo Mesto - Poganci	10.4	0	0	Western bypass of the Novo Mesto ring road.
H?	Celje (Lopata)	Novo Mesto	?	0	0	Route not yet finalised.

== History ==
The first highway in Slovenia was opened in 1972, connecting Vrhnika and Postojna. Constructed under the reformist-minded Communist government of Stane Kavčič, their development plan envisioned a modern highway network spanning Slovenia and connecting the republic to Italy and Austria. After the reformist fraction of the Communist Party of Slovenia was deposed in the early 1970s, the expansion of the Slovenian highway network came to a halt.

In 1994, the new country started a National Motorway Construction Programme (Slovene: Nacionalni program izgradnje avtocest v Republiki Sloveniji, NPIA), effectively re-using the old Communist plans. Since then, 528 km of motorways, expressways and similar roads have been completed, easing automotive transport across the country and providing a much better road service between eastern and western Europe. This has encouraged the development of transportation and export industries.

According to the Slovenian Motorway Company Act valid since December 2010, the construction and building of highways in Slovenia is carried out and financed by private companies, primarily the Motorway Company in the Republic of Slovenia (planned to become at least partially private), while the strategic planning and the acquisition of land for their course is carried out and financed by the state. The highways are owned by DARS.

The apparent slower tempo of construction of Slovenian highways in the north–south direction, in comparison to the east–west direction, has been the source of some speculation in Croatian media, because Croatia had built many highways northwards (toward Slovenia), yet the other side has not yet followed suit, thereby impacting the connections of Croatia with western Europe through Slovenia. This is despite some agreements on the official government level. In particular this refers to the roads between Trieste/Koper and Istria/Rijeka, the route Ljubljana-Zagreb, as well as Maribor-Zagreb. The officials from the Slovenian Ministry of Transportation have rejected claims that their road construction is lagging behind Croatia, saying that they are an exaggeration, as their overall kilometers of highway per person ratio and other statistics are favorable. In 2009, the first of the four planned highway connections was completed, the A2 Ljubljana-Obrežje towards Zagreb. A second one, A4 Maribor-Gruškovje towards Zagreb, was completed in 2018. As of 2020, construction of the Slovenian sections of both the future Pula-Koper and Rijeka-Postojna motorways is on hold, despite connecting sections on the Croatian side having long been completed.

== See also ==
- Driving in Slovenia
- Transport in Slovenia
- List of controlled-access highway systems
- Evolution of motorway construction in European nations
