= Gorenji Podšumberk =

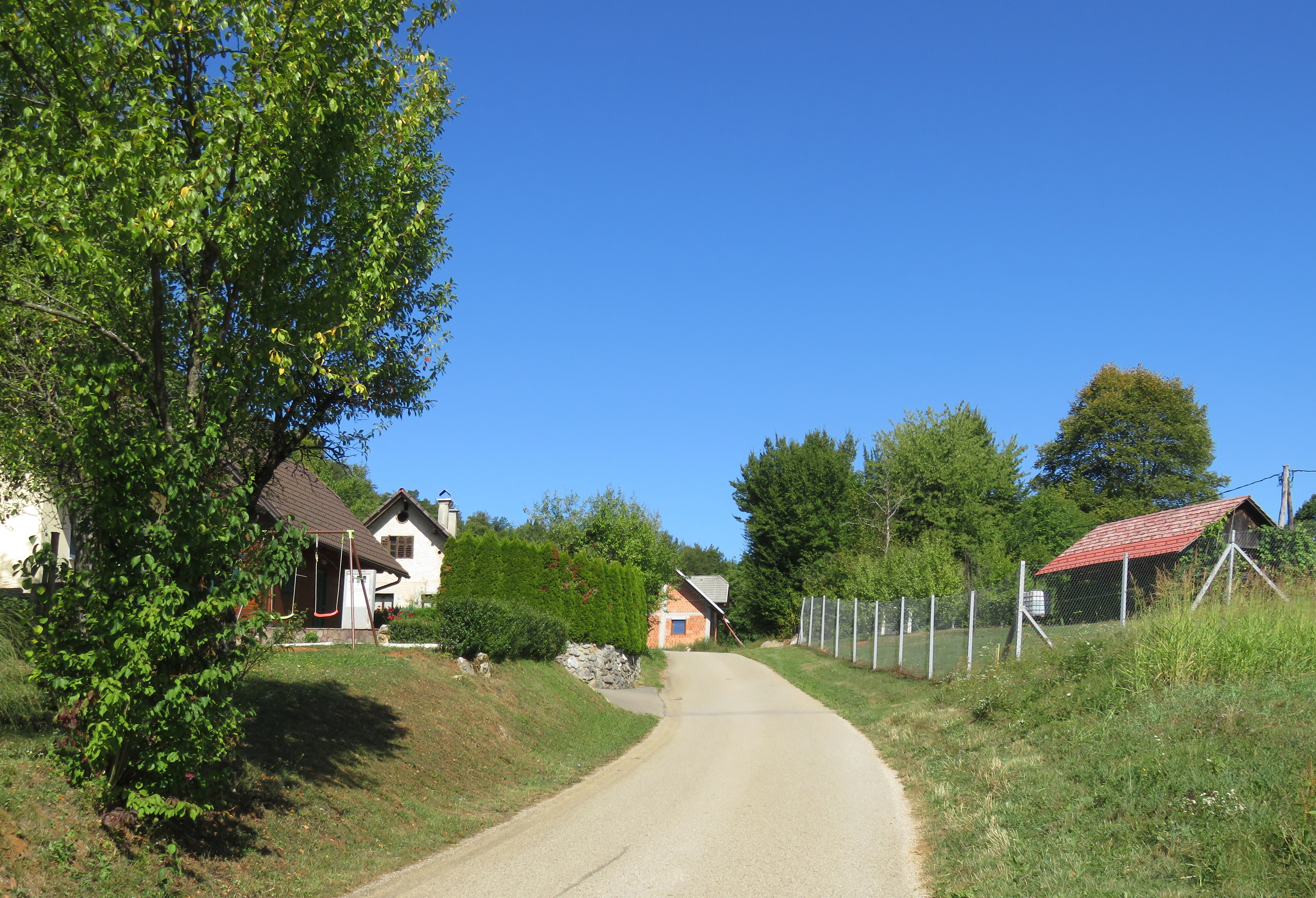

- Location in Slovenia
- Coordinates: 45°53′22.71″N 14°54′1.86″E
- Country: Slovenia
- Traditional region: Lower Carniola
- Statistical region: Southeast Slovenia
- Municipality: Trebnje

Area
  - Total: 1.16 km^{2} (0.45 sq mi)
- Elevation: 402.3 m (1,320 ft)

Population (2002)
  - Total: 18

Gorenji Podšumberk (pronounced [ɡɔˈɾeːnji pɔˈtʃuːmbɛɾk], in older sources also Gorenji Šumperk, German: Oberschönberg) is a small settlement in the Municipality of Trebnje in eastern Slovenia. It lies at the foot of the hill on which Šumberk Castle used to stand (the name Podšumberk means 'below Šumberk' in Slovene). The area is part of the traditional region of Lower Carniola. The municipality is now included in the Southeast Slovenia Statistical Region.

== Name ==
The name Gorenji Podšumberk means 'upper Podšumberk', differentiating the village from neighboring Dolenji Podšumberk ('lower Podšumberk'), which stands about 40 meters (130 ft) lower in elevation. The two villages were attested in historical sources as Gebuuicz in 1424, Gewobicz in 1440, and Jebabicz in 1463, among other spellings.
