= Transport in Slovenia =

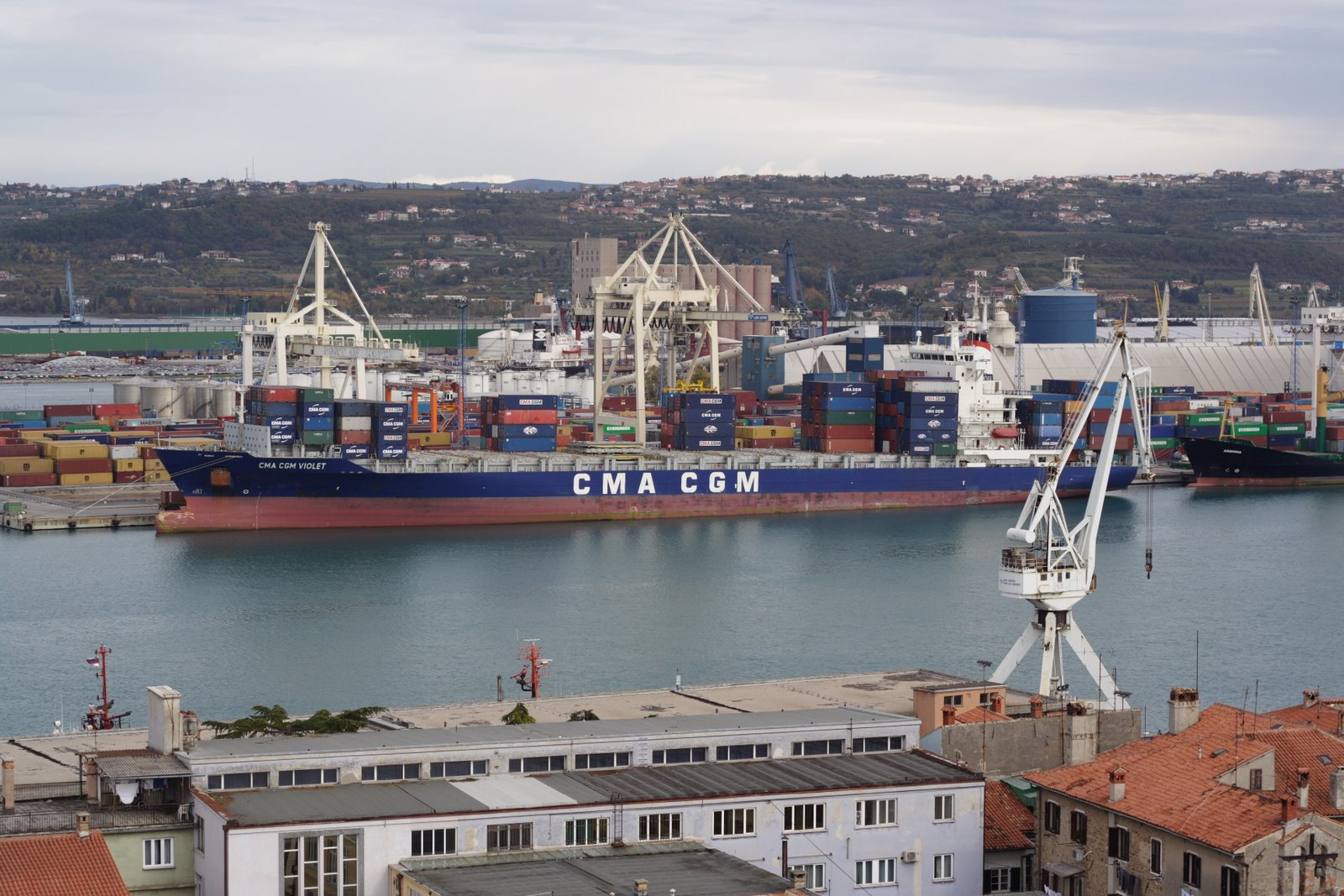
The Port of Koper

The location at the junction of the Mediterranean, the Alps, the Dinarides and the Pannonian Plain and the area being traversed by major rivers have been the reasons for the intersection of the main transport routes in Slovenia. Their course was established already in Antiquity. A particular geographic advantage in recent times has been the location of the intersection of the Pan-European transport corridors V (the fastest link between the North Adriatic, and Central and Eastern Europe) and X (linking Central Europe with the Balkans) in the country. This gives it a special position in the European social, economic and cultural integration and restructuring.

== Railways ==
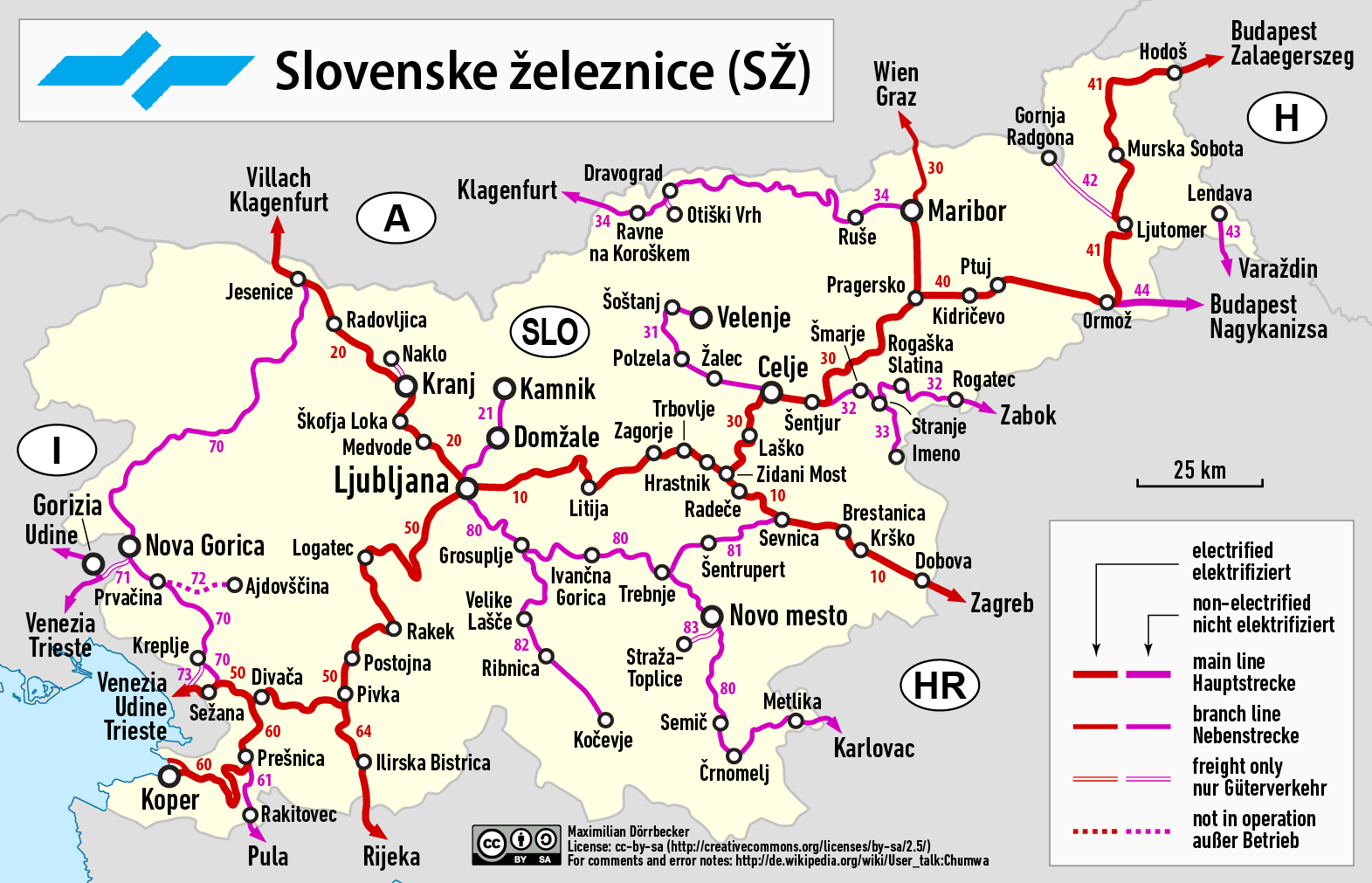
Railway network

The existing Slovenian rails, which were mostly built in the 19th century, are out-of-date and can't compete with the motorway network. The maintenance and modernisation of the Slovenian railway network has been neglected due to the lack of financial assets, creating bottlenecks. Nevertheless, it has been gaining momentum with the completion of the motorway cross. The Slovenian Railways company operates 1,229 km (764 mi) of 1,435 mm (4 ft 8 1/2 in) standard gauge tracks, 331 km (206 mi) as double track, and reaches all regions of the country. The network comprises main lines and regional lines. Electrification is provided by a 3 kV DC system, except at the junctions with railways of foreign countries, and covers 503.5 kilometres (312.9 mi). Due to the out-of-date infrastructure, the share of the railway freight transport has been in decline in Slovenia despite growing slightly in absolute terms. The railway passenger transport has been recovering after a large drop in the 1990s. The Pan-European railway corridors V and X, and several E-railways (E65, E67, E69, and E70) intersect in Slovenia. All international transit trains in Slovenia drive through the Ljubljana Railway Hub, and all international passenger trains stop there. As of 2018, first tenders should be invited for the upgrade of the Divača-Koper Railway.

== Roads ==
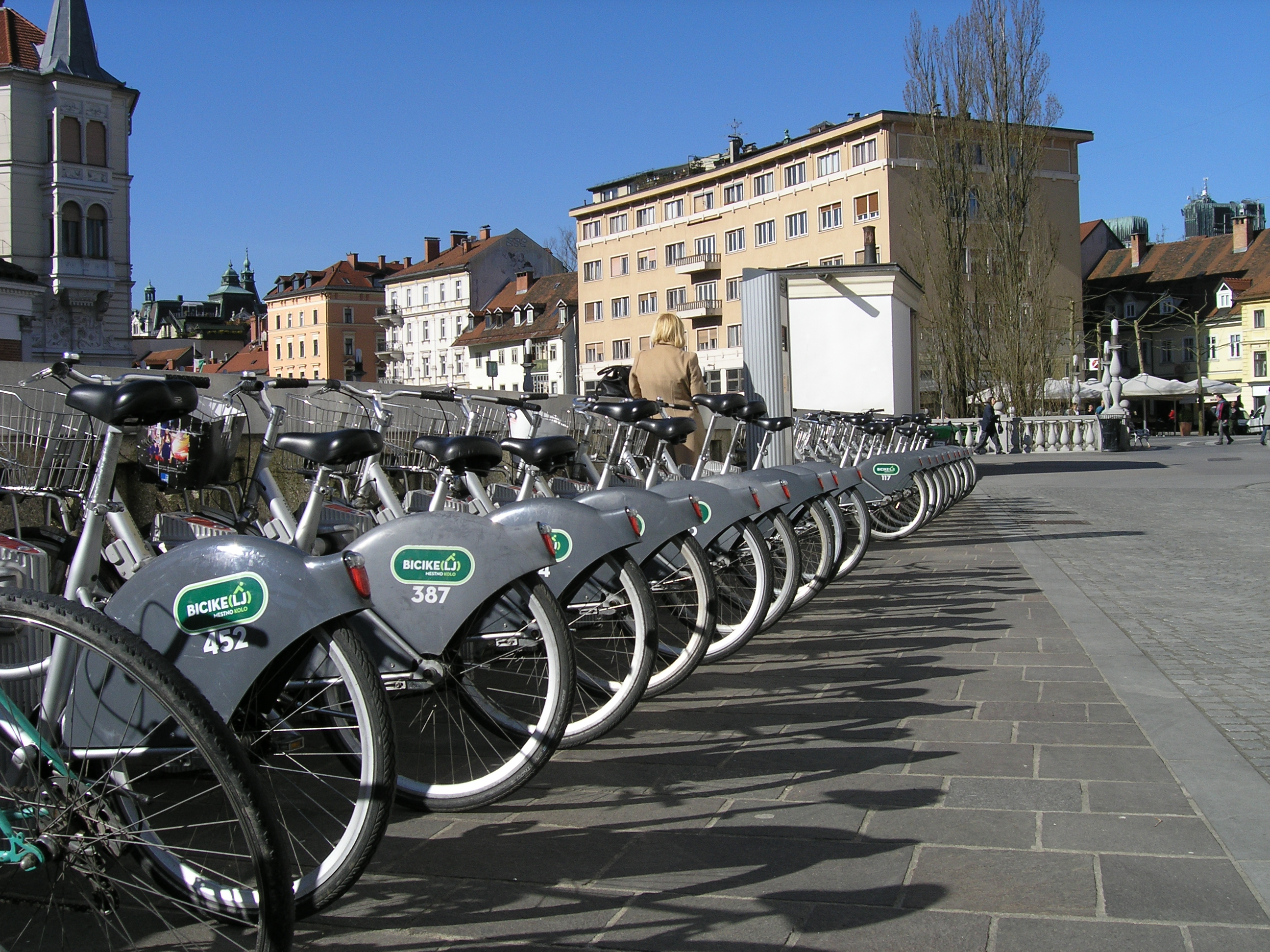
BicikeLJ, a Ljubljana-based self-service bicycle network, is free of charge for the first hour.

With the share of over 80%, the road freight and passenger transport constitutes the largest part of transport in Slovenia. Personal cars are much more popular than public road passenger transport, which has significantly declined. Motorways and expressways, operated by the Motorway Company in the Republic of Slovenia, are the state roads of the highest category. On motorways and express ways, cars must have a toll sticker. Slovenia has a very high motorway density compared to the European Union average. The first highway in Slovenia, the A1 motorway connecting Vrhnika and Postojna, was opened in 1972, but the construction was sped up significantly in 1994, when the National Assembly enacted the first National Motorway Construction Programme. Till February 2012, a network consisting of 528 km (328 mi) of motorways, expressways and similar roads has been built. Its essential section, the Slovenian Motorway Cross, which is part of the Trans-European Road network, was completed in October 2011. It comprises the motorway route heading from east to west, in line with the Pan-European Corridor V, and the motorway route heading in the north–south direction, in line with the Pan-European Corridor X, part of which is considered the Slovenian transport backbone. The newly built road system slowly, but steadily transforms Slovenia into a large conurbation and connects it as a unitary social, economic and cultural space, with links to neighbouring areas. In contrast, other state roads, managed by the Slovenian Infrastructure Agency (until January 2015 named Slovenian Roads Agency), have been rapidly deteriorating due to neglect and the overall increase in traffic. About half of them are in a bad condition. The urban and suburban network served by buses is relatively dense.

=== Highways ===
The first highway in Slovenia, the A1, was opened in 1958 as part of the major Yugoslav project of the Brotherhood and Unity Highway. The section between Ljubljana and Zagreb was built by 54,000 volunteers in less than eight months in 1958. It connects Vrhnika and Postojna. Constructed under the liberal minded government of Stane Kavčič their development plan envisioned a modern highway network spanning Slovenia and connecting the republic to Italy and Austria. After the liberal fraction of the Communist Party of Slovenia was deposed, expansion of the Slovenian highway network came to a halt. In the 1990s the new country started the 'National Programme of Highway Construction', effectively re-using the old communist plans. Since then about 400 km of motorways, expressways and similar roads have been completed, easing automotive transport across the country and providing a strong road service between eastern and western Europe. This has provided a boost to the national economy, encouraging the development of transportation and export industries.

There are two types of highways in Slovenia. Avtocesta (abbr. AC) are dual carriage way motorways with a speed limit of 130 km/h. They have green road signs as in Italy, Croatia and other countries. A hitra cesta (HC) is a secondary road also a dual carriageway but without a hard shoulder for emergencies. They have a speed limit of 110 km/h and have blue road signs.

Since 1 June 2008 highway users in Slovenia have been required to buy a toll sticker (Slovene: vinjeta). This system was investigated by the European Commission that it was unfair upon holiday makers and other non Slovenian users of the highway system. On 28 January 2010, after short-term stickers were introduced by Slovenia and some other changes were made to the Slovenian toll sticker system, the European Commission concluded that the toll sticker system is in accordance with European law.

According to the Slovenian Motorway Company Act valid since December 2010, the construction and building of highways in Slovenia is carried out and financed by private companies, primarily the Motorway Company in the Republic of Slovenia (Slovene: Družba za avtoceste v Republiki Sloveniji, acronym DARS), while the strategic planning and the acquisition of land for their course is carried out and financed by the Government of Slovenia. The highways are owned by DARS.

=== Bus transport ===
The beginnings of the bus transport in Slovenia date back to the early 20th century, when Slovenia was part of Austria-Hungary. The first two bus routes, between Gorizia and Postojna and between Idrija and Logatec, were opened in 1912, with additional four opened before World War I. The length of bus lines was 295 km (183 mi). The transport was primarily organised by the Post Directorate of Austria. After the war, the transport was organised by the Post Directorate of the Kingdom of Serbs, Croats and Slovenes, gradually joined by private operators. The buses, primarily manufactured by Saurer, Benz, and Daimler, were small and could accept six to ten passengers. The total length of bus lines at the end of the mid-war period was 2,893 km (1,798 mi).

After the end of World War II the bus traffic drastically developed. In 1946 the state ministry of local transport in the People's Republic of Slovenia established the National Bus and Transport Company of Slovenia (Državno avtobusno in prevozniško podjetje Slovenije, DAPPS). In 1948 the company was reorganised to another company named Slovenija avtopromet (SAP) with branches across the country, some of which were later transformed to independent local bus operators. The bus transport gradually replaced the railway transport and became the predominant means of public transport in the 1960s. The bus lines reached over 20,000 km (12,000 mi) (1 km/km^{2}), with 26 million passengers altogether.

Today the bus traffic is the main means of public passenger transport in Slovenia, particularly in towns. The main bus stations are in Ljubljana, Maribor, Celje, and Kranj. The bus transport and the public transport in general have steeply declined in Slovenia in the 1990s, particularly in the western part of the country. They are used mainly by people who have no other option; most people travel with their own car.

== Pipelines ==
Crude oil 5 km; natural gas 840 km (2010).

== Ports and harbours ==
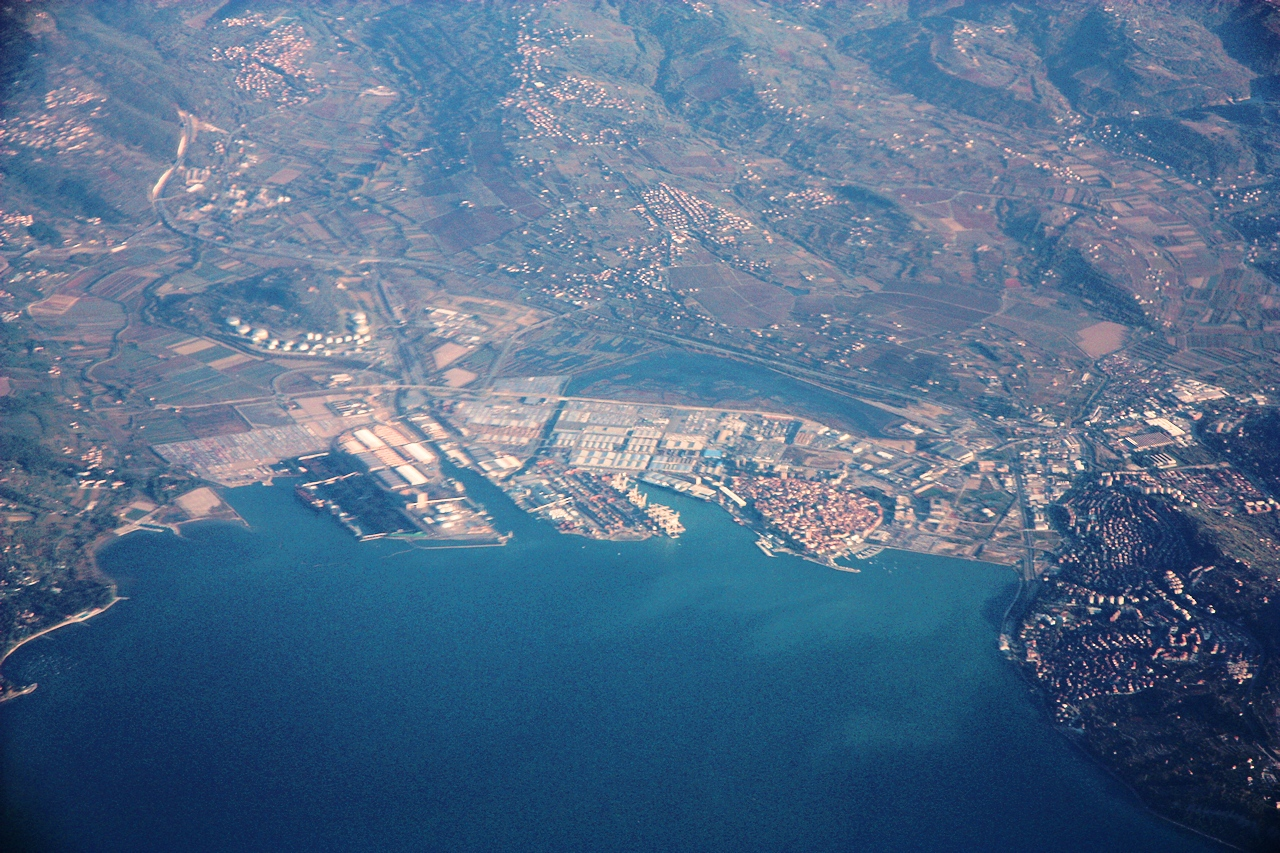
Aerial view of the Port of Koper

There are three ports on the Slovenian coast. The traffic is mostly international. The major is the Port of Koper, built in 1957. It is a feeder port. It is about 2,000 nautical miles (3,700 km; 2,300 mi) closer to destinations east of the Suez than the ports of Northern Europe, and the land transport from Koper by road and by railway to the main industrial centres in Central Europe is approximately 500 kilometres (310 mi) shorter than from Northern European ports. It is multimodal and one of the most modern in this part of the world, but its development is hindered by the lack of sufficient depth. From it, there are reliable and regular shipping container lines to all major world ports. The port has been rapidly growing and in 2011, more than 17 million tonnes (16,7 million long tons, 18,7 million short tons) of cargo passed through it. It is the largest Northern Adriatic port in terms of container transport. In 2011, almost 590,000 TEUs passed through it. There is a skewed balance in the direction of trade flows in the Port of Koper where import flows clearly outweigh export flows. The majority of maritime passenger traffic in Slovenia takes place in Koper, where a passenger terminal was completed in 2005. It has recorded about 100,000 passengers in 2011, and has been visited by the largest passenger ships, such as the MS Voyager of the Seas. The two smaller ports used for the international passenger transport are located in Izola and Piran. The Port of Piran is also used for the international transport of salt, whereas the Port of Izola is used for fish disembarkation. Passenger transport in Slovenia takes place mainly with Italy and Croatia. The only shipping company of Slovenia is Splošna plovba. It operates 28 ships with 1,025,000 tonnes of tonnage. It transports freight and is active only in foreign ports.

== Airports ==
The first regular flights in Slovenia were established in the 1930s when the Yugoslav flag-carrier Aeroput linked Ljubljana since 1933 with numerous domestic destinations such as Belgrade, Zagreb, Sušak and Borovo. In 1934 Aeroput opened the first international regular flight from Ljubljana linking it to Austrian city of Klagenfurt. After WWII, the company, rebranded as JAT Yugoslav Airlines, further developed and expanded the domestic network. A major break-trouth happened in the 1960s with the creation of a regional company, Adria Airways (known until 1986 as Inex-Adria Aviopromet because of its links with the Serbian company InterExport). Initially formed in Zagreb in 1961, the airline changed its headquarters to Ljubljana in 1964 with the opening of the new Ljubljana airport. It linked, along JAT, Ljubljana with numerous domestic and international destinations, and even included, since 1965, charter flights to the United States. Also, in this period, numerous foreign companies opened regular flights to Ljubljana. Later, with the independence of Slovenia, Adria Airways became the country's flag-carrier.

Air transport in Slovenia is quite limited, but has significantly grown since 1991. There are three international airports in Slovenia. Ljubljana Jože Pučnik Airport in the central part of the country is by far the busiest, with connections to many major European destinations. Around 1.4 million passengers and 15,000 to 17,000 tonnes of cargo pass through it each year. The Maribor Edvard Rusjan Airport is located in the eastern part of the country and the Portorož Airport in the western part. It has no scheduled or chartered passenger or cargo service as of 2018, but sees a lot of private flights. Adria Airways was the largest Slovenian airline until September 2019, when it declared bankruptcy and ceased all operations. Since 2003, several new carriers have entered the market, mainly low-cost airlines. The only Slovenian military airport is the Cerklje ob Krki Air Base near the Slovenia–Croatia border in the southwestern part of the country. There are also 12 public airports in Slovenia.

Airports: 16 (2012)
Airstrips: 44 (2004)

=== Airports - with paved runways ===
total: 7
over 3,047 m: 1
2,438 to 3,047 m: 1
1,524 to 2,437 m: 1
914 to 1,523 m: 3
under 914 m: 1 (2012)

=== Airports - with unpaved runways ===
total: 9
1,524 to 2,437 m: 1
914 to 1,523 m: 3
under 914 m: 5 (2012)

== See also ==
- List of airports in Slovenia
- List of tunnels in Slovenia
- Railway lines in Slovenia
