= Orlaka =

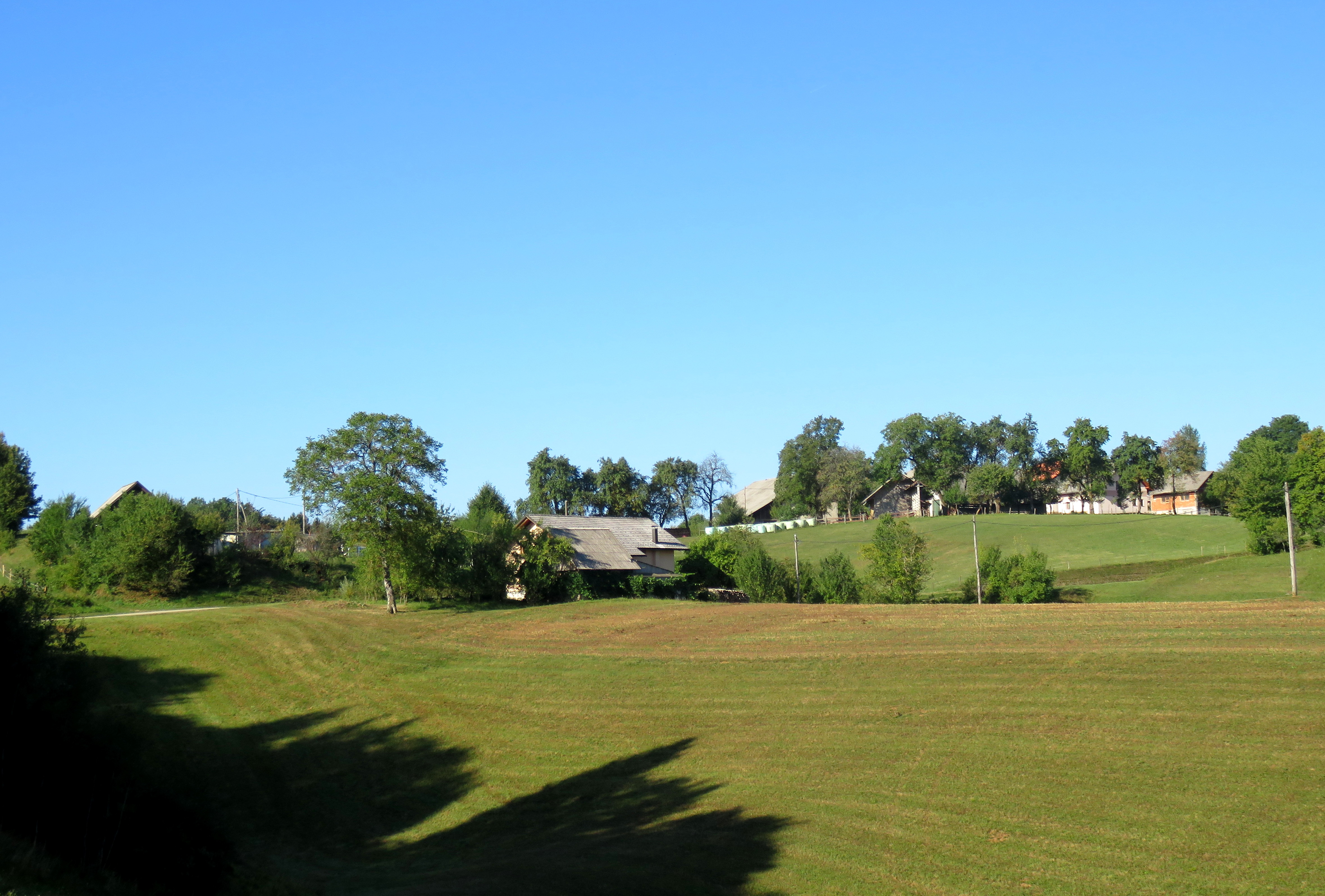

- Location in Slovenia
- Coordinates: 45°52′40.88″N 14°53′17.41″E
- Country: Slovenia
- Traditional region: Lower Carniola
- Statistical region: Southeast Slovenia
- Municipality: Trebnje

Area
  - Total: 1.74 km^{2} (0.67 sq mi)
- Elevation: 456.6 m (1,498 ft)

Population (2002)
  - Total: 43

Orlaka (pronounced [ˈoːɾlaka]) is a small settlement south of Šumberk in the Municipality of Trebnje in eastern Slovenia. The area is part of the traditional region of Lower Carniola. The municipality is now included in the Southeast Slovenia Statistical Region.

== Name ==
Orlaka was attested in historical sources as Horlach in 1378, Orlakchen in 1390, Arlakchen in 1440, and Arlach in 1448, among other spellings.
