= Šobec Campground =

Campsite near Lesce, Slovenia

Coordinates: 46.353287°N 14.148598°E

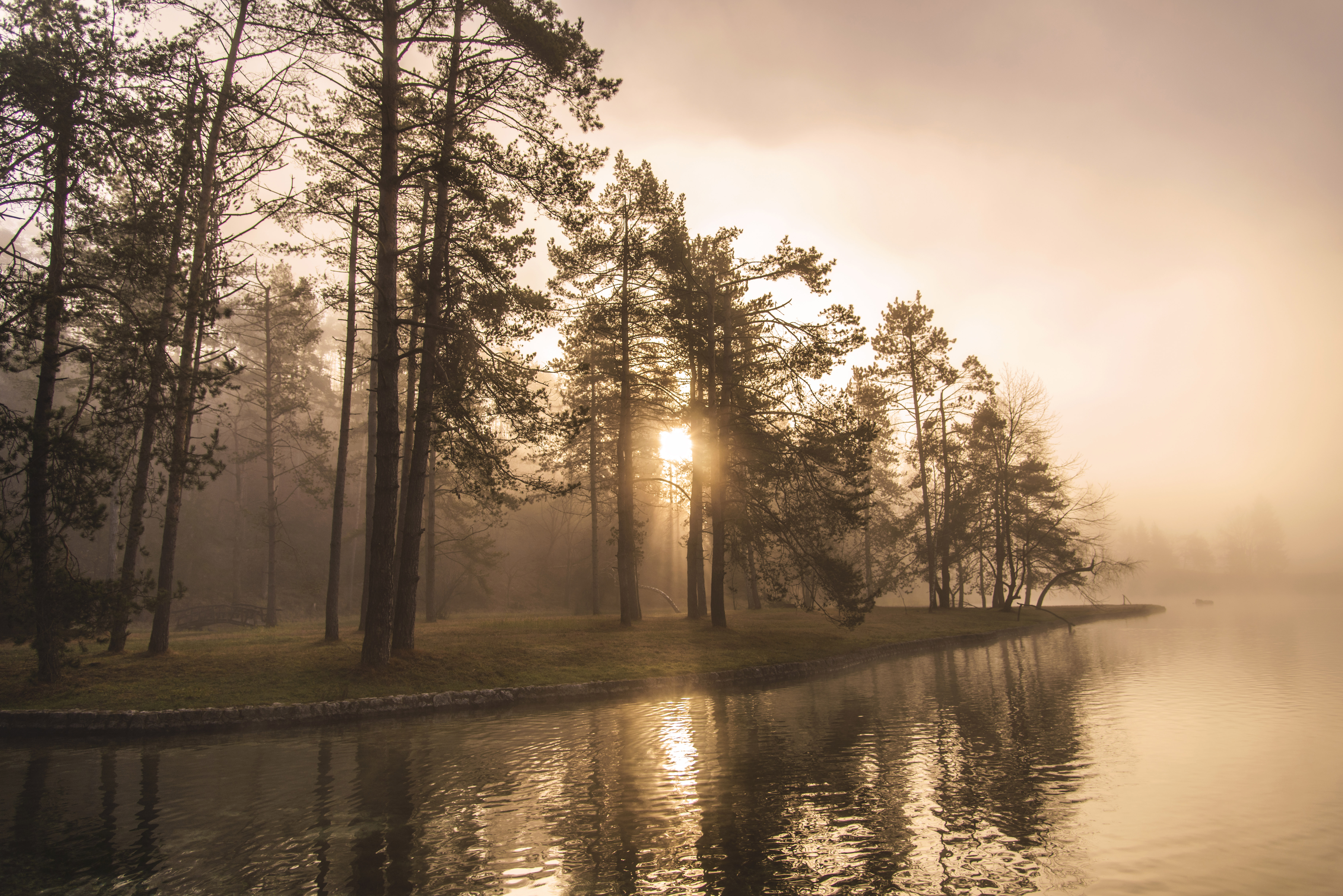
Sunrise at Šobec Pond

Šobec Campground is a campsite located 2 kilometers (1.2 mi) south of Highway E61 near Lesce, Slovenia.

The campsite lies next to Šobec Pond (Slovene: Šobčev bajer), a small artificial lake created by impounding a few inflows below the upper river terrace, where the southern part of Lesce is located. The elevation of the pond is 421 meters (1,381 ft). Its area is 2.6 hectares (6.4 acres), and its deepest point is 3 meters (9.8 ft). The pond is elliptical, with its major axis extending in a north–south direction. The pond was named after the Šobec farm, which stands nearby.

The campsite near the pond is in a pine forest next to the Sava Dolinka River. With an area of more than 15 hectares (37 acres), it is a higher-quality campsite. During the winter the campsite is closed, but it is nevertheless regularly visited by people from all over Europe because it is a popular starting point for hiking around the Upper Carniola region.
