= Dolenji Podšumberk =

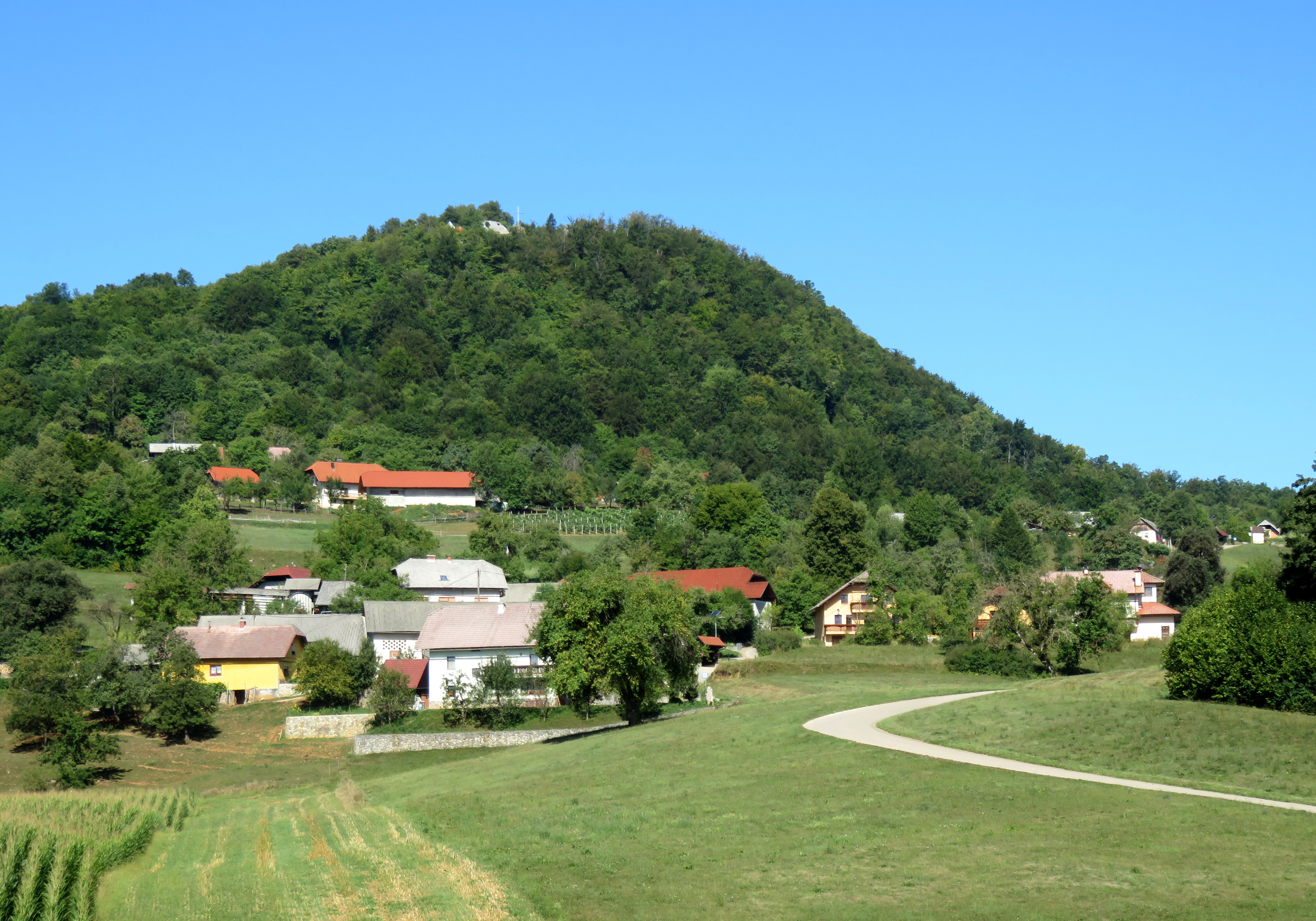

- Location in Slovenia
- Coordinates: 45°53′18.83″N 14°54′15.32″E
- Country: Slovenia
- Traditional region: Lower Carniola
- Statistical region: Southeast Slovenia
- Municipality: Trebnje

Area
  - Total: 0.4 km^{2} (0.15 sq mi)
- Elevation: 359.6 m (1,180 ft)

Population (2002)
  - Total: 32

Dolenji Podšumberk (pronounced [dɔˈleːnji pɔˈtʃuːmbɛɾk], in older sources also Dolenji Šumperk, German: Unterschönberg) is a small settlement in the Municipality of Trebnje in eastern Slovenia. The municipality is included in the Southeast Slovenia Statistical Region. The area is part of the traditional region of Lower Carniola.

== Name ==
The name Dolenji Podšumberk means 'lower Podšumberk', differentiating the village from neighboring Gorenji Podšumberk ('upper Podšumberk'), which stands about 40 meters (130 ft) higher in elevation. The two villages were attested in historical sources as Gebuuicz in 1424, Gewobicz in 1440, and Jebabicz in 1463, among other spellings.
