= Lesce-Bled Airport =

Lesce-Bled Airport Letališče Lesce
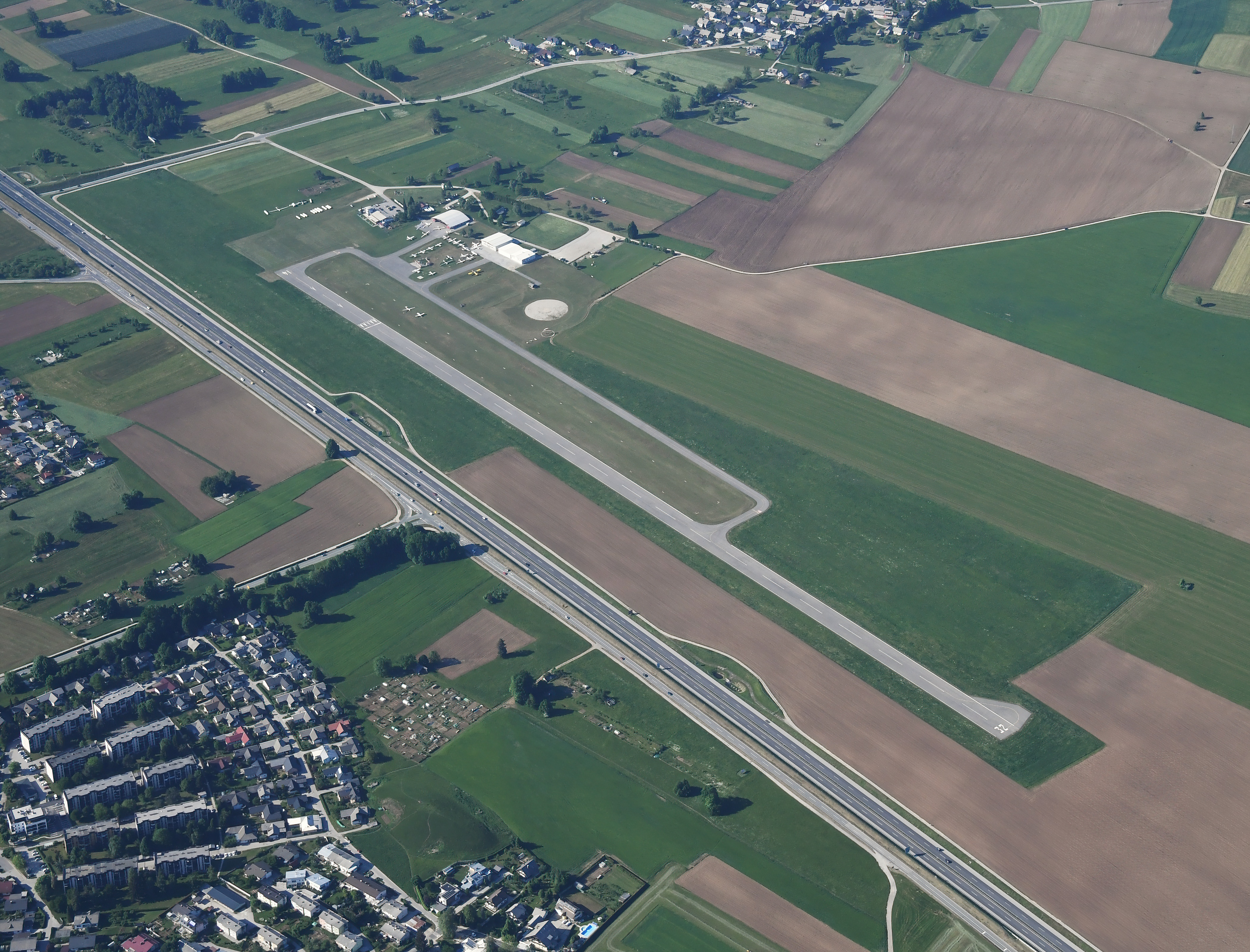
- IATA: none; ICAO: LJBL

Summary
- Airport type: Public
- Owner: Municipality of Radovljica
- Location: Lesce
- Elevation AMSL: 1,657 ft / 504 m
- Coordinates: 46°21′30″N 14°10′41″E
- Interactive map of Lesce-Bled Airport

Runways
Direction	Length		Surface
Direction	ft	m	Surface
14/32	3,700	1,130	Asphalt
14/32	1,970	600	grass

Lesce-Bled Airport (ICAO: LJBL) (Slovene: Letališče Lesce) is located in Lesce, in the northwest part of Slovenia, only a few "air" kilometers between airports in Slovenia and Austria. Road connections with Austria and Italy are possible via the A2 motorway.

The operator of the airport is the Public Commercial Institution ALC Lesce-Bled, established by the nearby municipality of Radovljica. Permanent users of the airport include Aeroclub ALC Lesce-Bled, Flycom, Flight Academy and others. The Bled area is a popular tourist location, in large part due to scenic lake Bled.

== Flying ==
Just north of the airport lies the Karavanke Alps mountain chain, which eases difficult flightpaths during bad weather. To the west of lake Bled, one can see the highest Slovenian mountain range, the Julian Alps, which include Slovenia's highest peak, Triglav (altitude 2864 m).

For experienced and ambitious glider pilots, Lesce-Bled can be an ideal starting point for long-distance flights in the direction of Italy, Austria and even further to Germany, France and Switzerland. Ridges and mountains close to Lesce allow an early beginning of thermal activity and as such, an early take-off. Pilots can then follow the Alps in a north-westerly direction. High speeds are attainable due to the ridges which also provide ridge lift in the case of northern and south-western winds.

== World records attained ==
The Aero Club ALC Lesce-Bled has more than 300 member pilots. It is the only European airport with two world records to its name, flown by Mihael Thaler and Boštjan Pristavec. Mihael Thaler broke the world speed record in the FAI 15 m class when he, on 6 July 1999, flew the 100 km triangle with an average speed of 181.4 km/h.

In 2004, Boštjan Pristavec broke the world record in the ultra-light sailplane class. His average speed flown with the Slovenian sailplane Apis was 118.44 km/h. The record still holds to this day.

Many club pilots fly cross-country flights. They are very active on the OLC Online contest, where the best results from the club can be found. The glider pilots from Lesce also frequently take the highest places in the national gliding competitions. One of the best flights were the 750 km FAI (Fédération Aéronautique Internationale) triangle from Miha Thaler, 1000 km flight by Miha Thaler and a 1000 km flight flown by Boštjan Pristavec.

== Recreational facilities ==
The airfield has a separate area with sanitary facilities and all necessary conditions for camping. There is also restaurant with terrace offering a view on the airfield.

== History ==
The aviation activity in this area began in the First World War when it was used as an auxiliary airfield of the Austro-Hungarian Air Force during the Isonzo front. It was then used as the auxiliary German airfield during the Second World War, but the airfield was plagued by the frequent flooding and terrain instability.

The republic gliding center was established there in 1947 to explore soaring in the mountains. A hangar was relocated from Kompolje and remains at the airport to this day. After the war a new grass runway was constructed to remediate the flooding, which was completed in 1954. In 1956, the Alpski letalski center flying club was founded and continued with tradition of numerous pre-war flying clubs in the vicinity.

In July 1957 JAT Yugoslav Airlines opened the Belgrade–Bled route with a Douglas DC-3 airliner., however the commercial traffic ceased with the opening of Ljubljana airport in 1963. Since then, the airport served mainly for sport and panoramic flying, but the sudden reduction of state funding forced the flying club members to find other sources of income, by doing various jobs for the local companies, thus collecting the money to buy new aircraft and pay for their flying. Lesce airport was also one of the few airports in Yugoslavia where the flying of the foreign pilots was allowed, thus greatly contributing to the tourism in the region.

Many aviation-related business emerged because of the airport. Elan started the production of Glaser-Dirks gliders and the former employees of Elan Flight still continue with a business of aircraft construction and repair.
