= Driving in Slovenia =

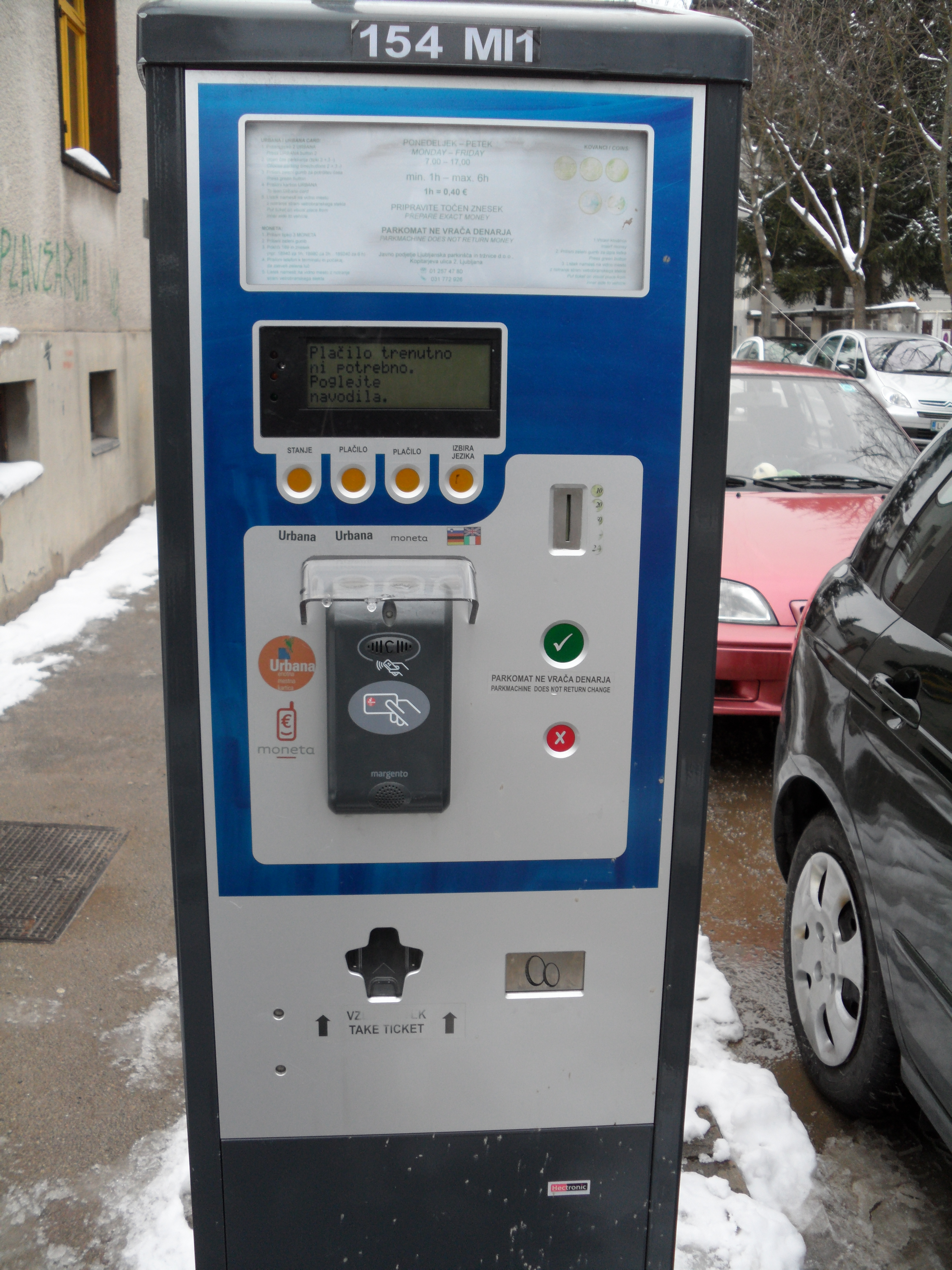
A parking meter in Ljubljana

Driving in Slovenia can be performed by licensed individuals over the age of 18. Vehicles drive on the right side of the road in Slovenia.

== Speed limits ==

The speed limits in Slovenia are 50 km/h (31 mph) in built up areas, 90 km/h (56 mph) outside built up areas, 110 km/h (68 mph) on dual carriageways and 130 km/h (81 mph) on motorways.

== Right of way ==
Buses have right of way at all times (and may sometimes pull out without warning).

== Daytime running headlamps ==
All vehicles must use headlamps at all times.

== Toll roads ==
In accordance with an amendment to the Public Roads Act, approved by the National Assembly of the Republic of Slovenia at the end of April 2008, use of toll stickers (Slovene: vinjete) is obligatory for all vehicles with a permissible maximum weight of 3,500 kg (7,700 lb) (the current first and second toll-rate category) on motorways and expressways in Slovenia as of 1 July 2008. The toll-collection system with stickers was introduced with the aim of improving traffic flow and reducing exhaust emissions.

With the introduction of the toll-collection system with stickers in the second half of 2008, only half-year stickers were sold, and annual stickers for 2009 were made available at the beginning of December 2008. From 1 July 2008 onwards, purchase of a sticker is obligatory for use of a toll road with a vehicle whose permissible maximum weight does not exceed 3,500 kg (7,700 lb), regardless of the maximum weight of a trailer.

The toll stickers have been criticized by the European Commission and various automobile clubs from Central and Southern Europe, spawning numerous guides on how to avoid highways, and causing heavy traffic damaging the roadway on secondary roads. Nevertheless, the main protesters were Austrian, and yet Austria has had a toll-sticker system in place for many years. On 28 January 2010, after short-term toll stickers were introduced by Slovenia and some other changes were made to the Slovenian toll-sticker system, the European Commission concluded that the toll-sticker system is in accordance with European law.

== Parking in cities ==
- Yellow spaces are reserved and may not be used.
- Blue spaces are for use for a limited amount of time, usually up to 15 minutes.
- White spaces may be used by anybody free of charge if the traffic sign does not instruct to pay the fee in the nearby parking meter.

== Regulations ==
- The minimum age for driving in Slovenia is 18.
- Documentation must be carried at all times, as it can be requested by the police or by municipal wardens.
- The use of mobile phones whilst driving is banned.
- Drink-driving is not an option: the blood-alcohol limit is 0.05 mg per 100ml and penalties are severe.
- Snow-tyres or chains must be used in snowy conditions.
