= Artiža Vas =

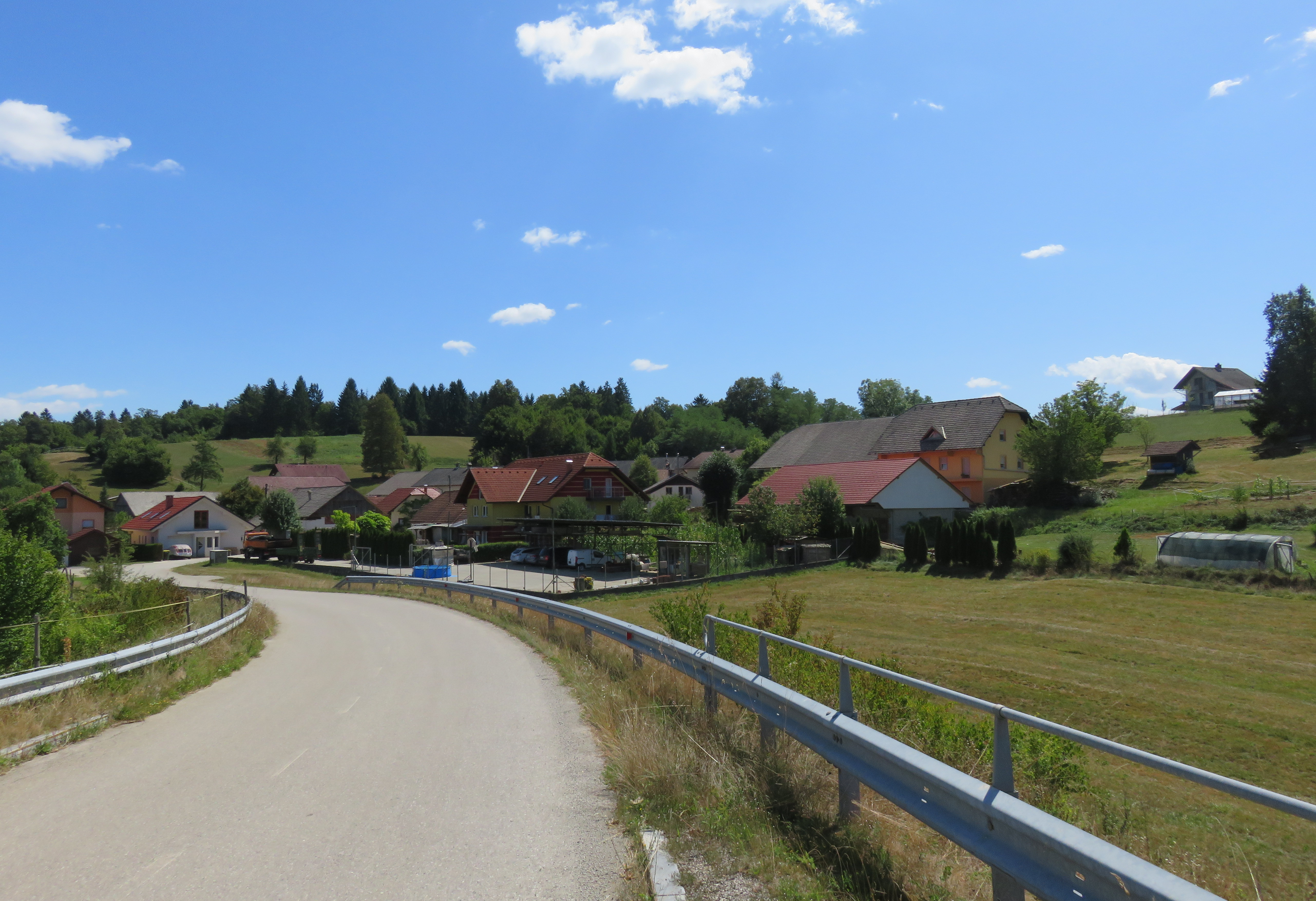

- Location in Slovenia
- Coordinates: 45°55′56.6″N 14°49′49.52″E
- Country: Slovenia
- Traditional region: Lower Carniola
- Statistical region: Central Slovenia
- Municipality: Ivančna Gorica

Area
  - Total: 2.39 km^{2} (0.92 sq mi)
- Elevation: 317 m (1,040 ft)

Population (2002)
  - Total: 26

Artiža Vas (pronounced [aɾˈtiːʒa ˈʋaːs]; Slovene: Artiža vas) is a small village in the Municipality of Ivančna Gorica in central Slovenia. It lies just east of Ivančna Gorica and the A2 motorway runs across the settlement's territory just north of the village core. The area is part of the historical region of Lower Carniola. The municipality is now included in the Central Slovenia Statistical Region.

== Name ==
Artiža Vas was attested in historical sources as Hartwigisdorf in 1190, Hertwigisdorff in 1250, and Erwischendorff in 1505.

== Cultural heritage ==
A small roadside chapel-shrine in the middle of the village dates to the late 19th century.
