= Arčelca =

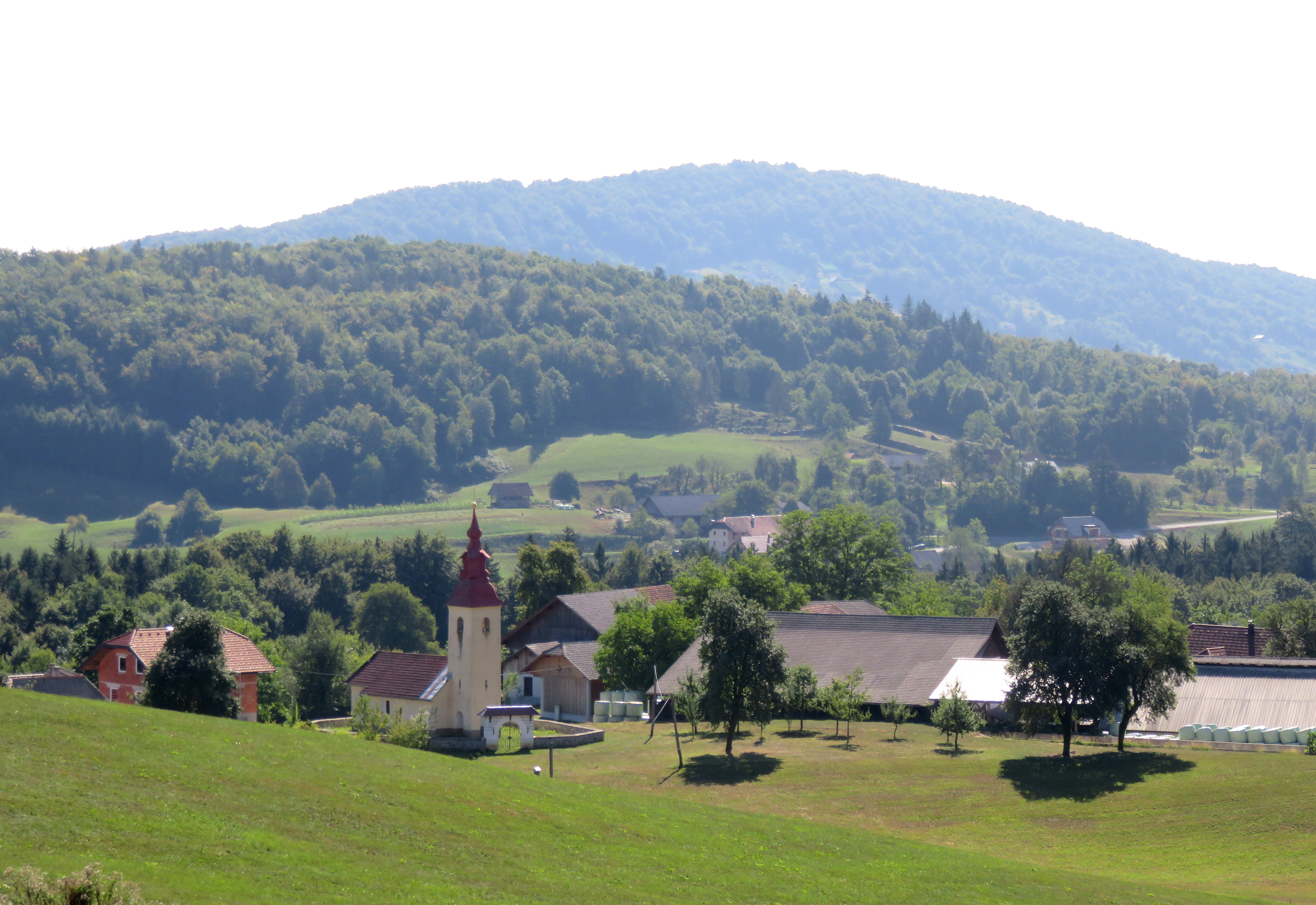

- Location in Slovenia
- Coordinates: 45°52′46.45″N 14°54′29.29″E
- Country: Slovenia
- Traditional region: Lower Carniola
- Statistical region: Southeast Slovenia
- Municipality: Trebnje

Area
  - Total: 2.39 km^{2} (0.92 sq mi)
- Elevation: 380.1 m (1,247 ft)

Population (2002)
  - Total: 18

Arčelca (pronounced [aɾˈtʃeːu̯tsa], in older sources Arčevce, German: Artschenza) is a small settlement in the Municipality of Trebnje in eastern Slovenia. The area is part of the traditional region of Lower Carniola. The municipality is now included in the Southeast Slovenia Statistical Region.

== Name ==
Arčelca was attested in historical sources as Ruczebitz and Rudczebicz in 1463, and Rutschewicz in 1467.

== Church ==
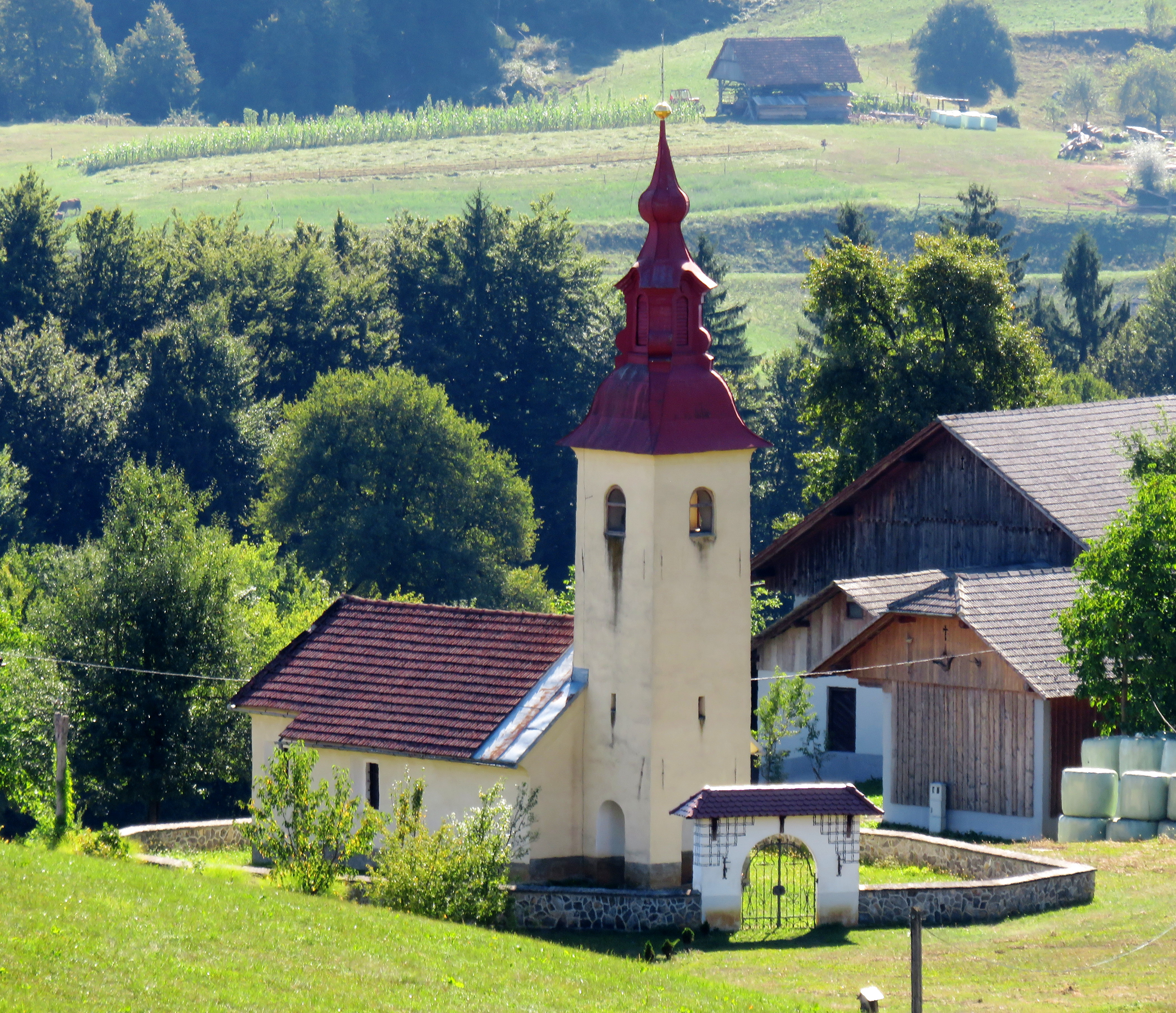
Saint Mary Magdalene Church

The local church is dedicated to Mary Magdalene and belongs to the Parish of Sela pri Šumberku. It is a medieval building that was greatly remodelled in the Baroque style in the second half of the 17th century.
