= Motorway Company in the Republic of Slovenia =

Highway maintainer in Slovenia

The Motorway Company in the Republic of Slovenia (Slovene: Družba za avtoceste v Republiki Sloveniji, DARS) is a joint-stock company in Slovenia that operates and maintains the Slovenian motorway network and the related infrastructure. It was established by the Republic of Slovenia as a public enterprise on 11 November 1993, and was entered in the companies' register on 7 December 1993. On 1 January 2004, it became a joint-stock company, 100% owned by the Republic of Slovenia. Its head office is located in Celje, and a branch office in Ljubljana. Since 16 October 2009 until 27 June 2012, Mateja Duhovnik was the chairwoman of the management board. Due to having failed to act with due diligence, she has been dismissed and temporarily replaced by Matjaž Knez. The company supervises the Slovenian motorways and highways from five centres, located in Ljubljana, Vransko, Kozina, Maribor, and Hrušica
