= Ajbelj =

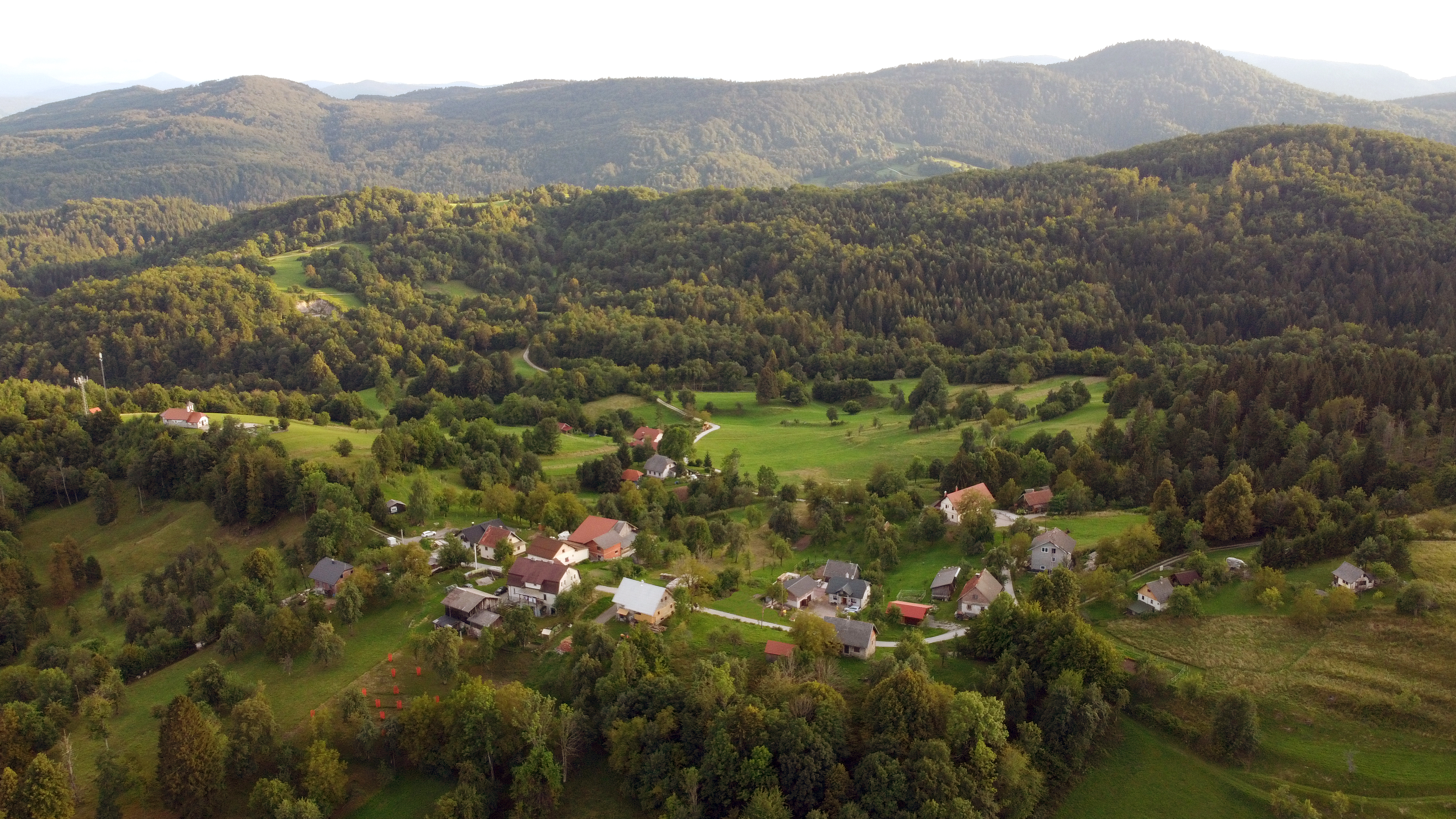
- Ajbelj

- Location in Slovenia
- Coordinates: 45°31′56.51″N 14°51′17.7″E
- Country: Slovenia
- Traditional region: Lower Carniola
- Statistical region: Southeast Slovenia
- Municipality: Kostel

Area
  - Total: 1.99 km^{2} (0.77 sq mi)
- Elevation: 618.4 m (2,029 ft)

Population (2002)
  - Total: 6
- Postal code: 1326

Ajbelj (pronounced [ˈaːi̯bəl]; in older sources also Ajbel; German: Aibel, also Eibel or Eibl) is a settlement in the Municipality of Kostel in southern Slovenia. The area is part of the traditional region of Lower Carniola and is now included in the Southeast Slovenia Statistical Region. It is a linear village standing on a hill above Kaptol. To the southeast is a karst polje with sinkholes where there are tilled fields, hay fields, and wooded land. There are large numbers of wild boar, bears, deer, foxes, and badgers in the area.

== Name ==
Ajbelj was attested in historical sources as Alben and Albenn in 1494; it is recorded in other old records as Alble and is locally known as Vajblen (with prothetic v-). The name is believed to derive from the personal name *Albelj, borrowed from German as a hypocorism of the name Albrecht. The change of the name from Alb- to Ajb- was a dissimilation process (l – ľ > j – ľ) with parallels elsewhere in Slovene. However, Heinz Dieter Pohl derives the identical German oronym Aibel, Eibel from German Alpe 'mountain pasture' via the diminutive forms Älpl, Alpl, Älpele with Middle Bavarian dialect voicing of p and vocalization of l—that is, [áibl].

== History ==
Ajbelj was settled in part by Gottschee Germans. Under feudalism, Ajbelj was part of the Dominion of Kostel. The land registry of 1570 records that the settlement consisted of four full farms. In the past, the economy of Ajbelj was partially tied to peddling goods. In mid-April 1945, Chetnik forces took up positions in the village. They engaged Partisan forces for several days, during which half of the houses in the village were destroyed, before withdrawing north towards Kočevska Reka. The Ajbelj volunteer fire department became a founding unit of the Kočevje municipal fire department on 28 August 1955. In the 1970s the village still relied on cisterns for its water supply and there were three wooden houses with thatched roofs.

== Cultural heritage ==
Registered religious heritage items in Ajbelj include Divine Savior Church, a chapel shrine, and the village cemetery.

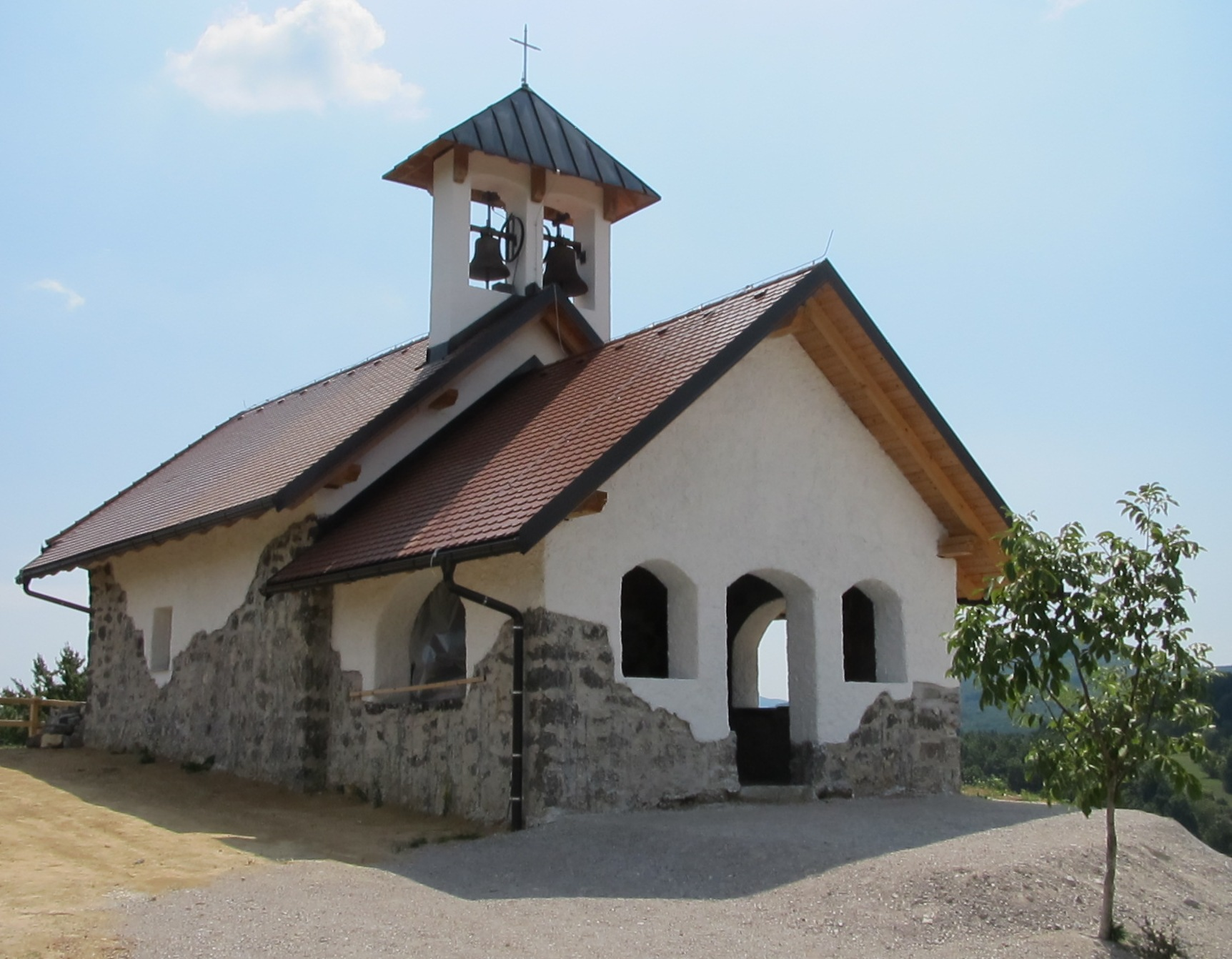
Divine Savior Church in 2012

- Divine Savior Church (Podružnična cerkev Božjega Odrešenika, Cerkev Božjega zveličanja) in Ajbelj, sometimes known as Saint Bartholomew's Church (Cerkev sv. Jerneja), was a chapel of ease that dated from the 17th century and stood on a rise southeast of the village, next to the cemetery. It was doused in gasoline by unknown persons and burned in 1956. The fire destroyed the church's shingled roof, its beams, and its interior furnishings, including the main altar by the art historian Ivan Šubic (1856–1924) dating from 1893, two gilded side altars dedicated to Saint Bartholomew and Saint Ursula, the stations of the cross, and a coffered ceiling dating to 1711. Only part of the sanctuary wall survived and the two church bells were transferred to a small chapel-shrine in the settlement. Reconstruction of the church began in 2012, when one of the bells was also removed from the shrine and returned to the rebuilt bell gable of the church.
- A closed chapel-shrine dedicated to the Virgin Mary stands in the northern part of the village. It dates from the beginning of the 19th century. The front of the shrine is accentuated by two large piers.
- The village cemetery is located south of the settlement next to Divine Savior Church. It contains some gravestones recognized as historically and artistically noteworthy dating from the late 19th century and early 20th century.

Ajbelj also has two residences registered as cultural heritage.

- The farm at Ajbelj no. 6 stands on the road in the middle of the village. It has a cellar, is built of stone and wood, and has a steep gabled roof. The farm includes a wooden hay rack and a stone well with a winch. Most of the farm dates to the 19th century with mid-20th-century renovations.
- The house at Ajbelj no. 9 stands near the chapel-shrine in the middle of the village. It has a partial cellar and is a rectangular, single-story, stone building with a symmetrical gabled roof. The stone door casing has a semi-circular top with the initials IS and the year 1851 carved into it.
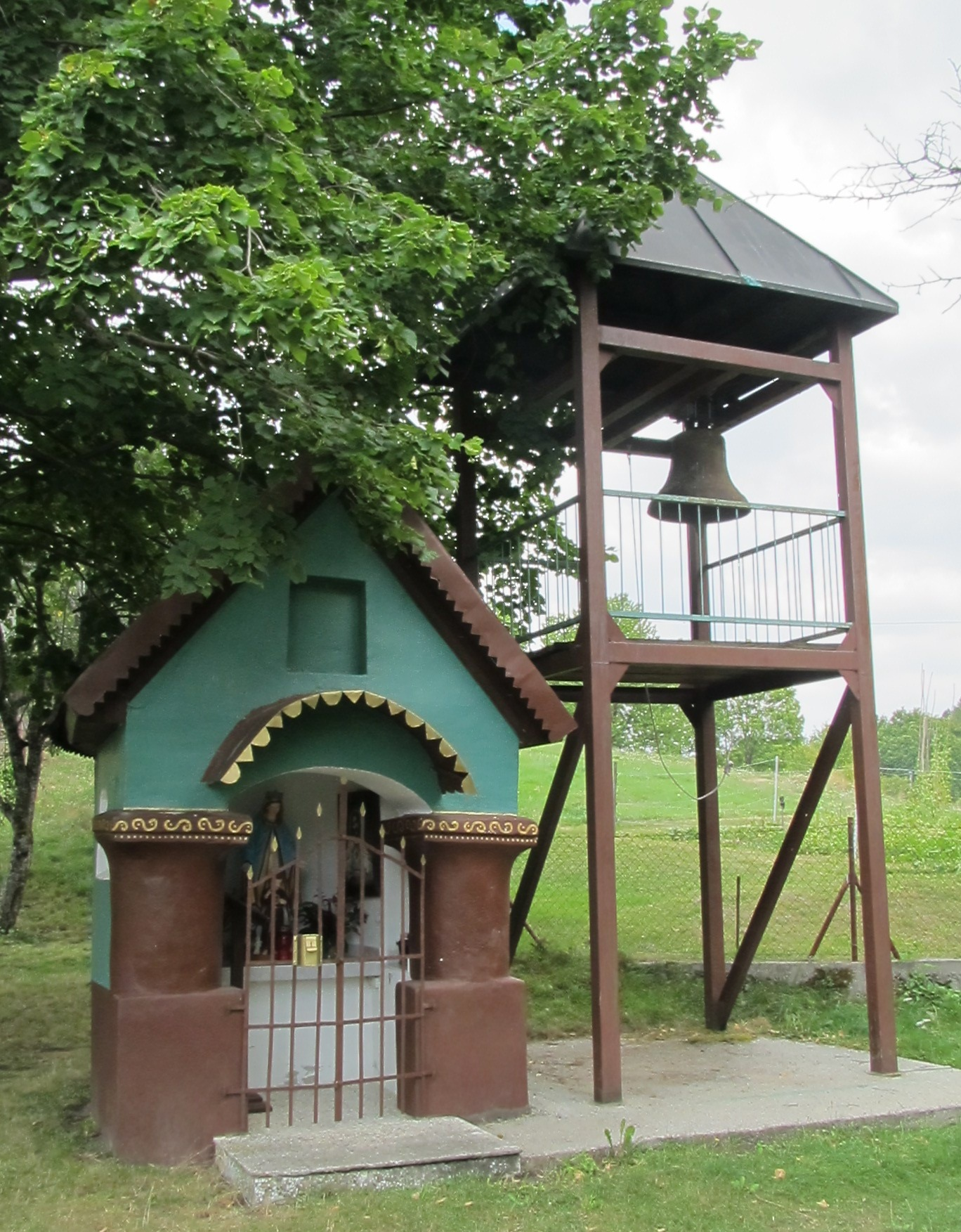
Shrine with church bell

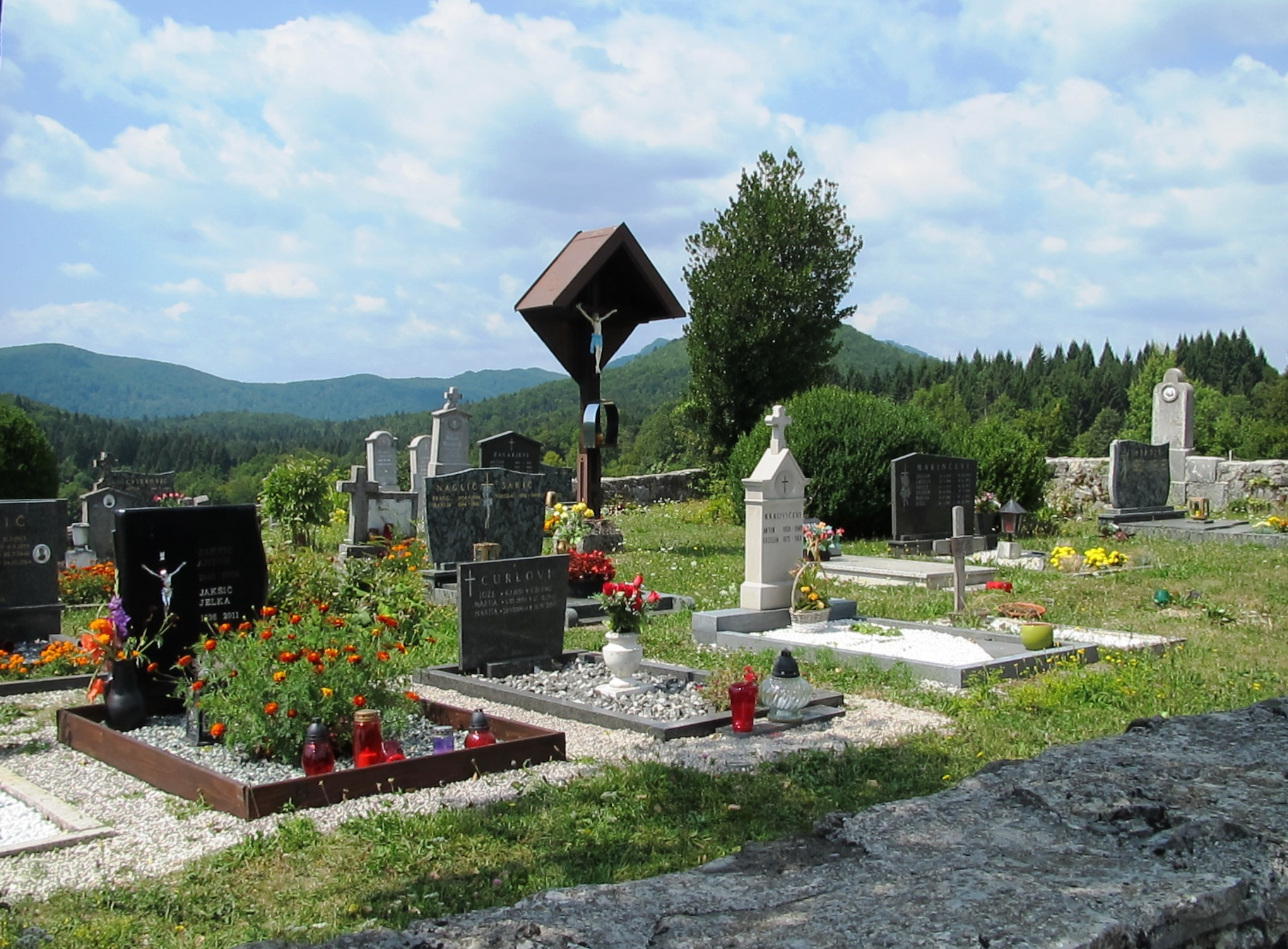
Village cemetery

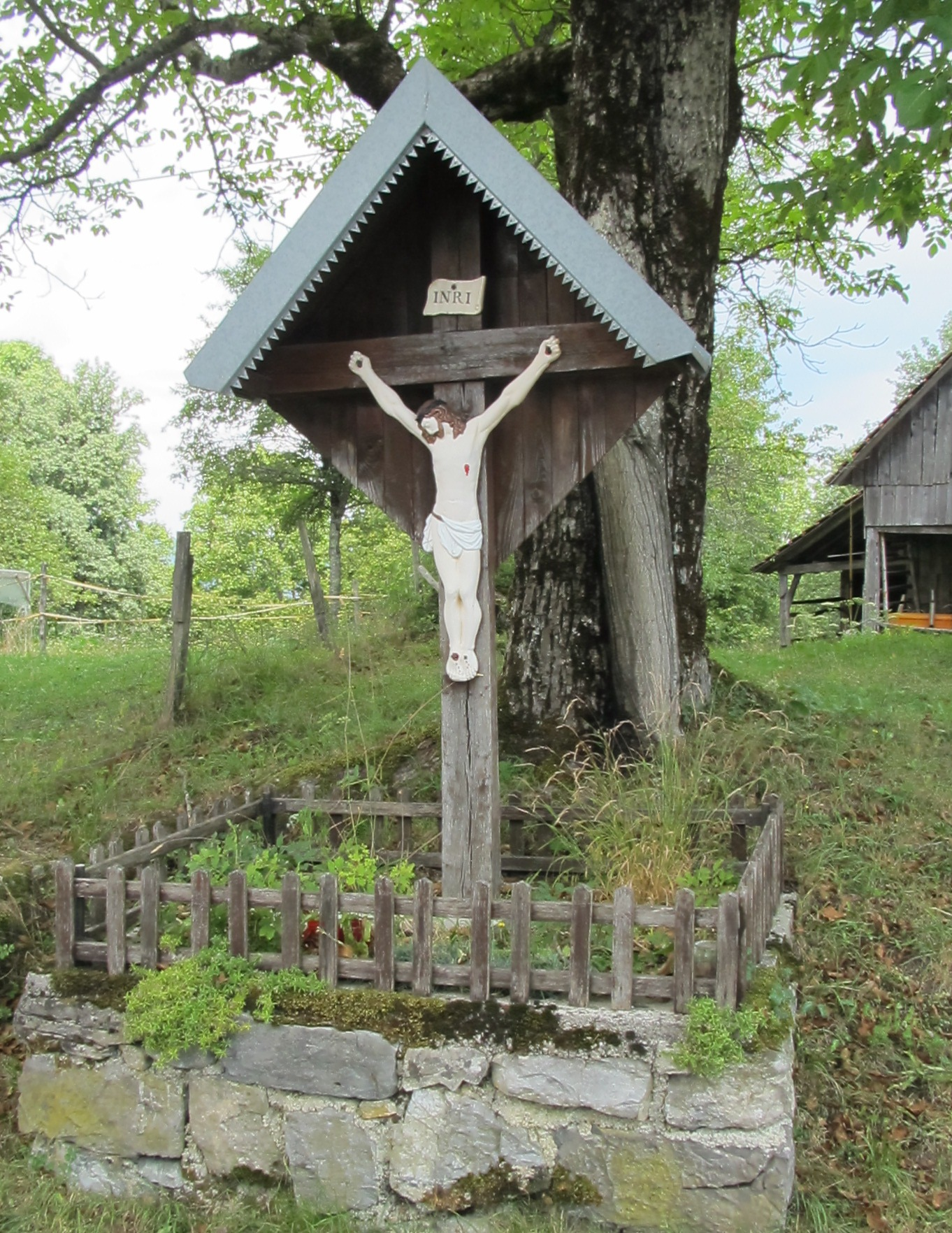
Village crucifix

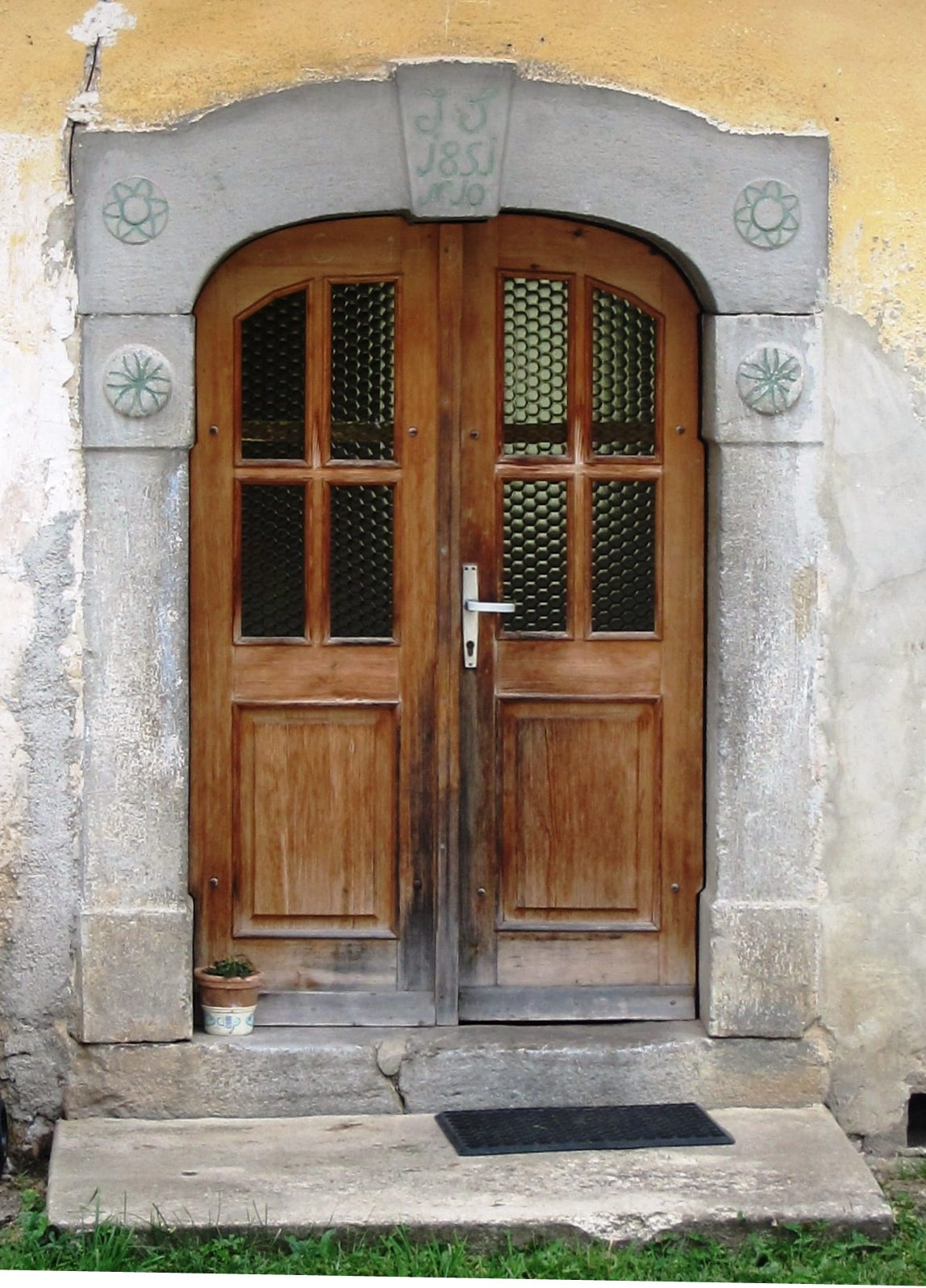
Door at house no. 9

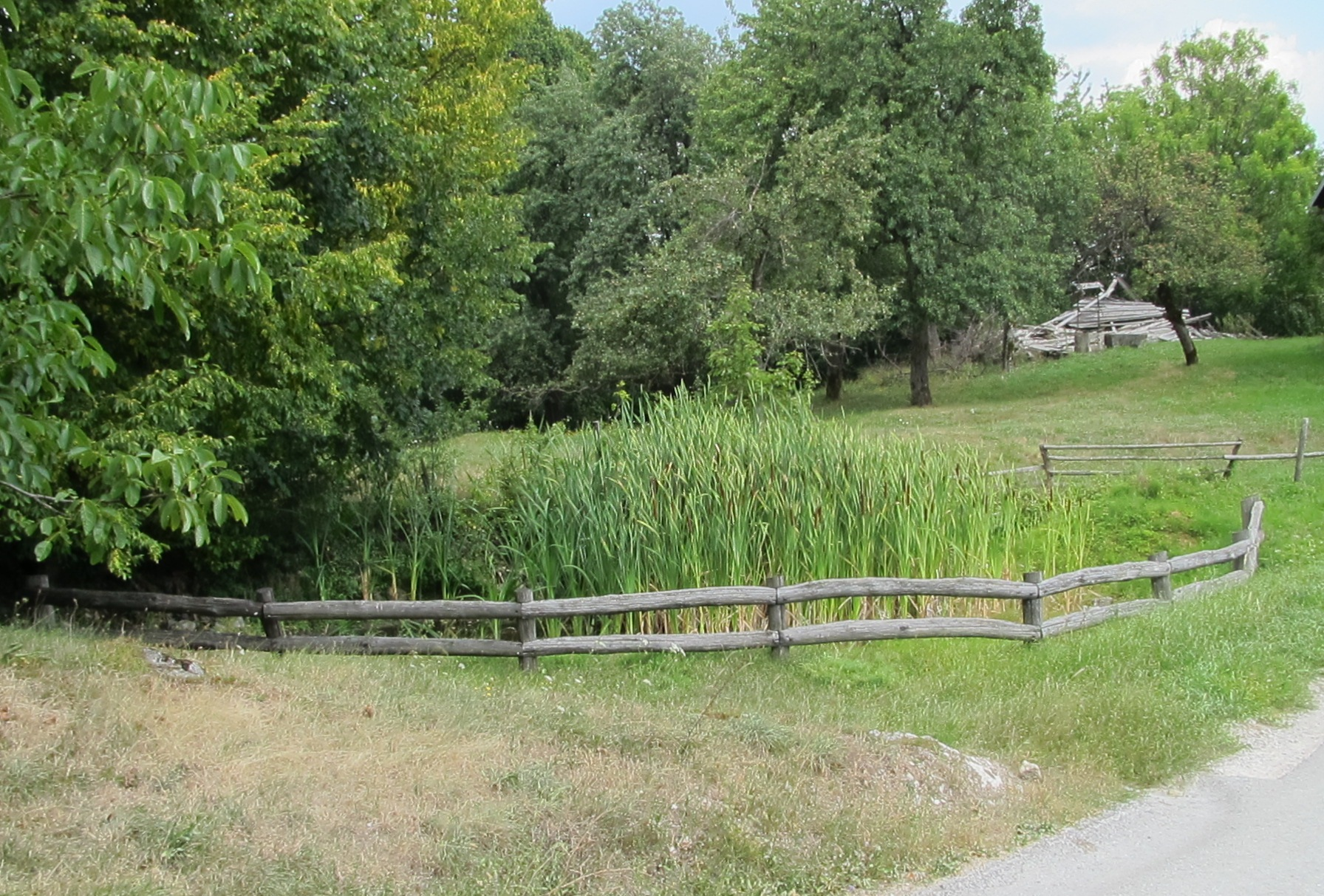
Village pond
