= Lesce =

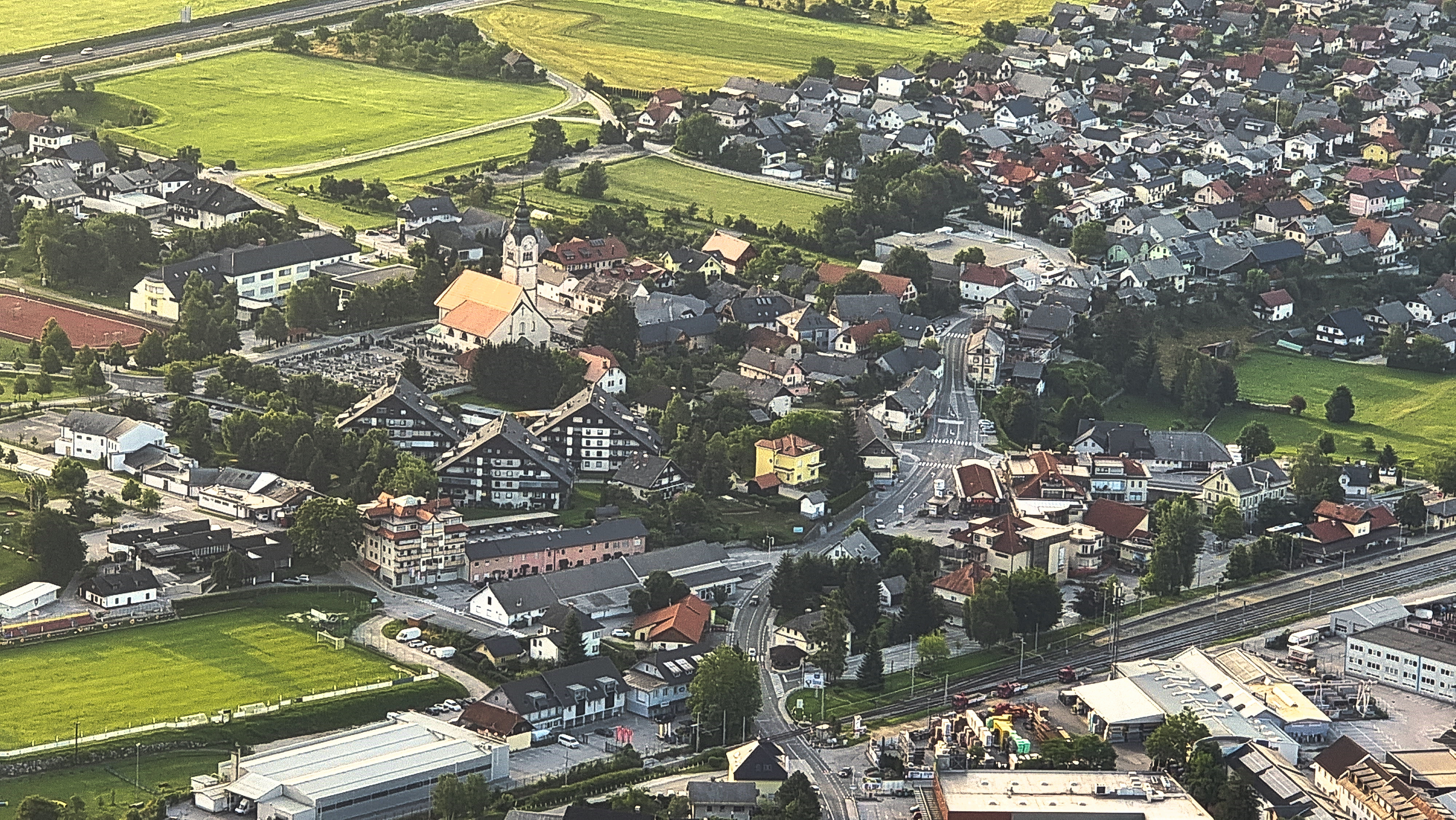

- Location in Slovenia
- Coordinates: 46°21′36″N 14°9′23″E
- Country: Slovenia
- Traditional region: Upper Carniola
- Statistical region: Upper Carniola
- Municipality: Radovljica
- Elevation: 494 m (1,621 ft)

Population (2015)
  - Total: 2,918

Lesce (pronounced [lɛˈstsɛ]) is a town in the Municipality of Radovljica in the Upper Carniola region of Slovenia. It is an industrial and tourist centre.

It is one of the earliest-mentioned settlements in the region, first noted in a document from 1004 together with Bled and Bohinj.

Lesce is the location of the Lesce–Bled Airfield and Šobec Campground. Lesce is also the home town of retired ski jumpers Vinko Bogataj and Franci Petek. Lesce was selected by MTV as the site for its annual Spring Break Jam in the spring of 2009.

== Church ==
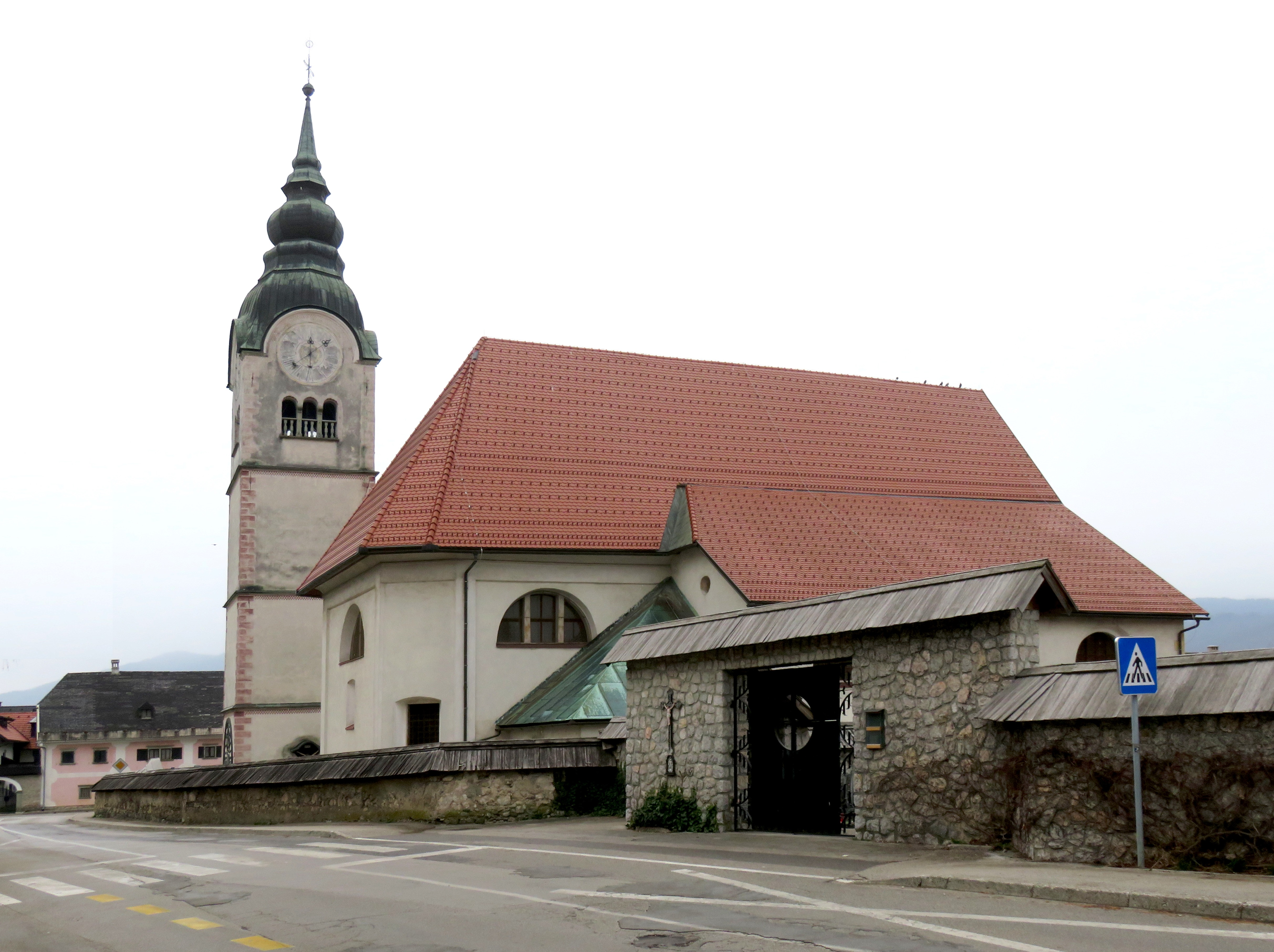
Assumption Church

In the centre of the old town there is a three-aisled pilgrimage church dedicated to the Assumption of the Virgin, originally a Gothic church with remnants of 14th-century frescos on its exterior, but which was extensively changed in the 17th century in the Baroque style. The church is known for its frescoes in the dome of the chancel painted by Franc Jelovšek.

== Sports ==
NK Lesce football club has a long tradition of competing at the regional level (since 1946). Na Žagi Stadium (Slovene: Stadion Na Žagi) is a multi-purpose stadium in Lesce. It is used for football matches and is the home ground of NK Lesce. The stadium currently holds 800 spectators, of which 45 can be seated.
