= Sela pri Šumberku =

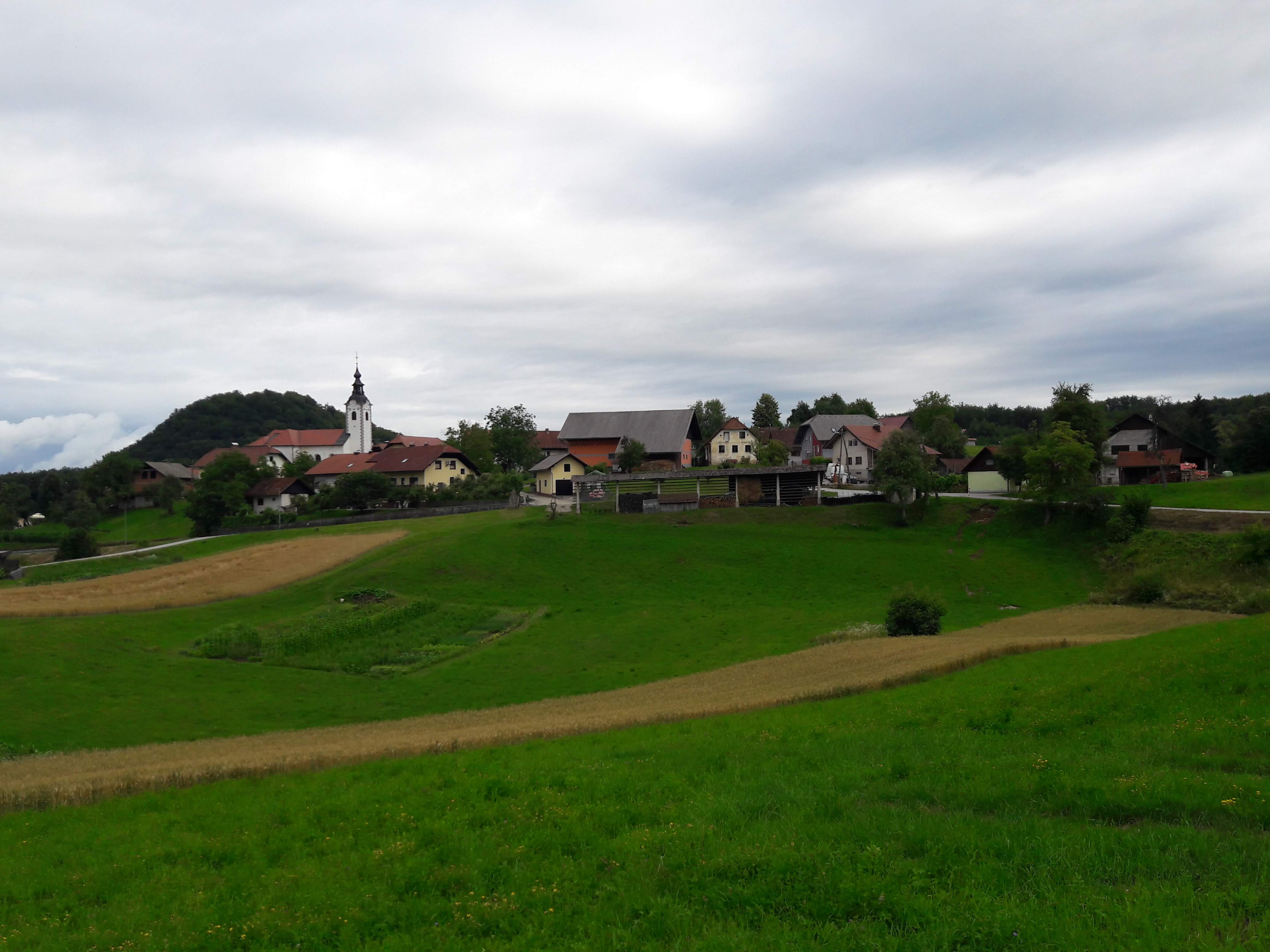
- Sela pri Šumberku

- Location in Slovenia
- Coordinates: 45°53′45.02″N 14°53′18.68″E
- Country: Slovenia
- Traditional region: Lower Carniola
- Statistical region: Southeast Slovenia
- Municipality: Trebnje

Area
  - Total: 4.54 km^{2} (1.75 sq mi)
- Elevation: 456.8 m (1,499 ft)

Population (2002)
  - Total: 100

Sela pri Šumberku (pronounced [ˈseːla pɾi ˈʃuːmbɛɾku]) is a village in the Municipality of Trebnje in eastern Slovenia. The area is part of the traditional region of Lower Carniola. The municipality is now included in the Southeast Slovenia Statistical Region.

== History ==
A part-time school was established in the village in 1865, and regular schooling was started in 1872, when a school was also built. During the Second World War, the Partisans burned the school and rectory in Sela pri Šumberku on Christmas Day, 1943.

== Šumberk Castle ==
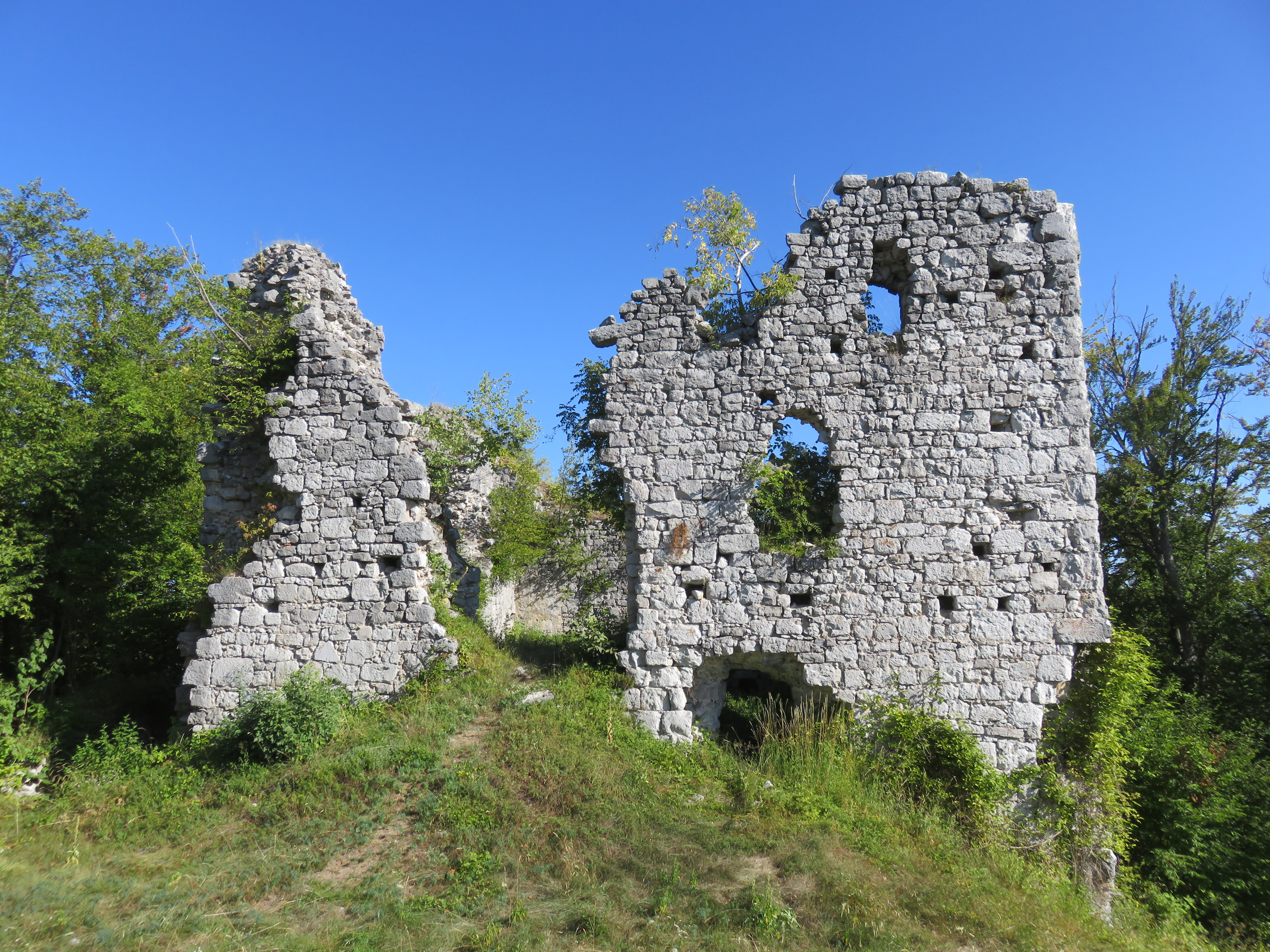
Šumberk Castle ruins

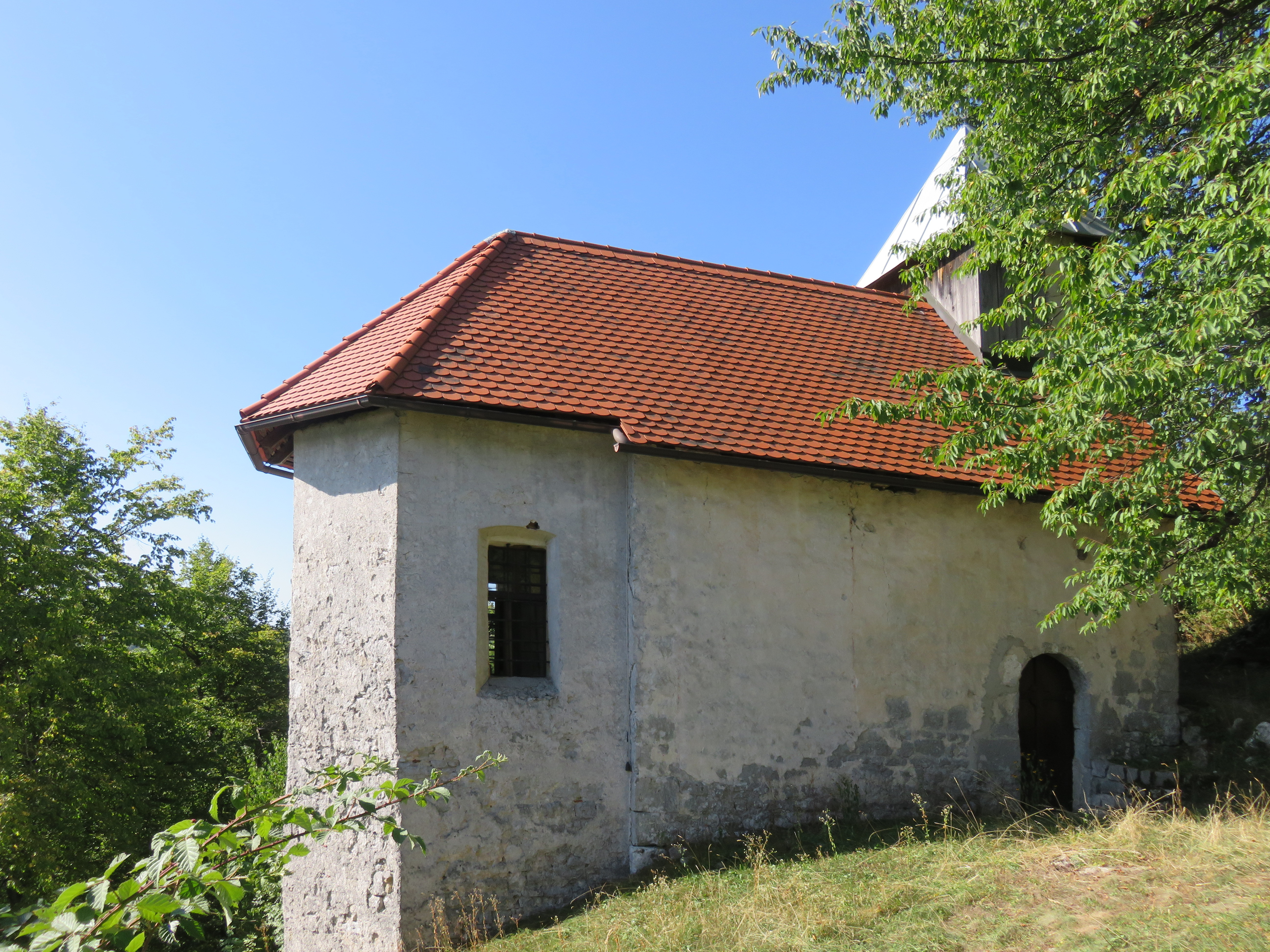
Saint Catherine's Church

The ruins of Šumberk Castle (German: Schönberg), a 12th-century castle that was abandoned in the early 18th century, stand on a hill southeast of the settlement. The castle chapel survives as a church dedicated to Saint Catherine.

== Church ==
The parish church in the settlement is dedicated to John the Baptist and belongs to the Roman Catholic Diocese of Novo Mesto. It was first mentioned in written documents dating to 1526, but the current building dates to the mid-19th century.
