= Kolarica =

- Location in Slovenia
- Coordinates: 45°51′21″N 15°27′11″E
- Country: Slovenia
- Traditional region: Lower Carniola
- Statistical region: Lower Sava
- Municipality: Krško
- Elevation: 180 m (590 ft)

Kolarica (Slovene pronunciation: [ˈkoːlaɾitsa], also spelled Kolerica) is a former settlement in the Municipality of Krško in northeastern Slovenia. It is now part of the village of Slivje. The area is part of the traditional region of Lower Carniola. The municipality is now included in the Lower Sava Statistical Region.

== Geography ==
Kolarica stands southeast of the village center of Slivje.

== History ==
Kolarica was annexed by Slivje in 1953, ending its existence as an independent settlement.
