= Ulrich V of Pfannberg =

Ulrich V, Count of Pfannberg
- Born: 1287
- Died: 23 October 1354
- Spouses: Agnes of Walsee; Margaret of Werdenberg
- Father: Ulrich IV, Count of Pfannberg
- Mother: Margaret of Heunburg

Count Ulrich V of Pfannberg (1287 – 23 October 1354) was Count of Pfannberg. From 1322 to 1337, he was governor of Gornji Grad and from 1330 Marshal of the Duchy of Austria. From 1330 to 1335, he was also governor of Carinthia.

== Life ==
He was the son of Count Ulrich IV and Margaret of Heunburg.

While his father had completely run down the wealth and prestige of his family, Ulrich V had a very different style:

"... in spirit, vigor, courage, sympathy with the public affairs, striving for fame, glory and power, and even after assets, as the means to act Big, he was quite like his grandfather Henry, which he statesmanlike wisdom and moderation, and his loyalty to his sovereign. By these virtues, he not only saved his family from the threat of depravity, but raised it to a height of splendor, power and honor, which it had not seen even under Henry'.

Count Ulrich was knighted on the battlefield after the Battle of Gammelsdorf and betrothed to Agnes, a sister of Count Ulrich I of Walsee (d. 1329). Ulrich V married Agnes in 1314.

From 1315 to 1323, Ulrich served as governor of the Carinthian possessions of the Bishopric of Bamberg, including Reichenfels, St. Leonhard, Wolfsberg, Wernberg, Villach, Federaun, Arnoldstein, Tarvisio and Pontafel. He also served as castellan of Griffen.

In 1316, Ulrich fought in the battle of Esslingen under the Austrian dukes Frederick and Leopold and distinguished himself by his bravery.

In 1320 (according to John of Viktring in 1314), Ulrich V and Ulrich II of Walsee came to grief while fighting against Verona before Padua. They were rescued by Urlich I of Walsee.

In 1322, the House of Heunburg died out in the male line with the death of Ulrich's uncle Herman of Heunberg. Ulrich succeeded him as governor of Gornji Grad. He also inherited the Lordships of Heunburg, Mannsberg, Bleiburg and Trixen (with restrictions, since Herman's widow also asserted certain rights). He also inherited a 50% share of Celje; the other share was held by Frederick I of Celje, a member of the House of Sanneck.

In 1330, Ulrich served as a member of a court of arbitration in Augsburg, which ruled that the Duchy of Carinthia had fallen to the Dukes of Austria. In the same year he was honored with the office of Marshal in Austria.

Also in 1330, Ulrich repaid the mortgage on the fortress at Peilenstein. In 1331, Ulrich repaid several mortgages and thereby regained control over some of his family's possessions, including the fortresses at Kaisersberg, Mildenberg and Murnau, the court and toll at Bruck and the courts at Leoben and Kindberg. In 1332, the Duke mortgaged Pfannberg Castle to Ulrich V (under his father, the family had lost control of the eponymous castle).

In 1333, Ulrich headed a board of arbitration to decide a dispute between Abbot Henry of St. Paul's Abbey in the Lavanttal on the one hand, and Counts Ulrich II and Frederick II of Walsee and Henry of Hohenlohe on the other hand, about the ownership of the court at Remschnigg. The board ruled in favour of the Abbot.

In 1335, Duke Henry of Carithia died. He was succeeded by Duke Otto. Duke Otto decided to appoint Ulrich as governor of Carinthia, replacing Conrad of Auffenstein. In the same year, Ulrich sold his share in Celje to Frederick I.

From 1342 onwards, Ulrich was one of the tutors of Rudolf IV, Duke of Austria.

Also in 1342, Ulrich came into conflict with Bertram, the patriarch of Aquileia, who refused to invest Duke Albert II with Venzone. Ulrich, as commander of the Austrian army, was able to obtain a favourable compromise. As a reward, he was enfeoffed with the castle, town and district of Slovenj Gradec, which he sold to his brother-in-law Henry of Montpreis in 1351.

Patriarch Bertram died in 1350. His successor, Nicolaus of Luxemburg, confirmed Albert II as owner of the Carinthian fiefs Bertram had refused to him: the city and county of Venzone, the fortresses of Oberwippach and St. Michaelsberg and Clausen fortress for a twelve-year period.

In 1354, a dispute arose between Ulrich V and Count Ulrich III of Walsee over the jurisdiction over the Lordship of Weißenegg, which was adjacent to Heunberg. Walsee retained low justice over Weißeneck; Heunburg was awarded the high justice.

Also in 1354, Ulrich arranged a marriage between his son John and Margaret, the daughter of the late Count Rudolph of Schaunberg.

Peter Suchenwirt has praised Ulrich as a homo perfectus, a "perfect man", who combined all the essential virtues: wisdom, justice, generosity, temperance and fortitude.

== Marriage and issue ==
Ulrich first wife was Agnes (d. 1329), the daughter of Ulrich of Walsee and Diemud of Rohrau. This marriage remained childless.

After Agnes's death, but before 1331, Ulrich married Margaret, the daughter of Count Hugh II of Werdenberg and Euphemia of Ortenburg. They had three children:

- John (1321 – November 1362), last member of the House of Pfannberg in the male line, married
  1. in 1354 with Margaret (died after 1380), the daughter of Count Rudolf of Schaunberg
  2. in 1373 Count William III of Montfort (died c. 1379)
- Catherine (died after 1375), married in 1347 with Count Meinhard VI of Gorizia
- Margaret (died after 1374), married c. 1347 with Count Frederick of Ortenburg
