= Privilegium Minus =

1156 decree by Holy Roman Emperor Frederick I

The Privilegium Minus was a deed issued by Holy Roman Emperor Frederick Barbarossa on 17 September 1156. It included the elevation of the Bavarian frontier march of Austria (Ostarrîchi) to a duchy, which was given as an inheritable fief to the House of Babenberg.

== Content ==
The name is opposed to the 14th century Privilegium Maius, which was a forgery drawn up at the behest of the Habsburg duke Rudolf IV of Austria. The recipient of the Privilegium Minus was Frederick's paternal half-uncle, the Babenberg margrave Henry II Jasomirgott.

In addition to the elevation of his margraviate, the emperor determined that inheritance should also be possible through the female line of the ducal family. In the absence of children, the duke was allowed to designate a successor (libertas affectandi). However, this extraordinary privilege was bound to the persons of Henry Jasomirgott and his wife Theodora Komnene (dux Austrie patruus noster et uxor eius) for life, as both had no children and Henry's brothers Otto I of Freising and Conrad I of Passau had chosen ecclesiastical careers. The emperor reserved for himself the act of enfeoffment but would respect Henry's choice.

The duke's duty to attend the Imperial Diet was limited to those cases where it convened within the Bavarian lands (ad curias, quas imperator prefixerit in Bavaria), which saved costly traveling throughout the Empire. Also, Austria was henceforth only required to provide troops to the emperor in wars in its vicinity (in regna vel provincias Austrie vicinas). Henry Jasomirgott was obliged to further on discharge his traditional duties as former margrave.

== Background ==
The issue of the Privilegium Minus document is to be seen within the context of the conflict that pitted the Imperial House of Hohenstaufen against the ducal House of Welf in the Holy Roman Empire. In 1138 Emperor Frederick's uncle and predecessor, King Conrad III of Germany had deposed the reluctant Bavarian duke Henry the Proud and had enfeoffed his duchy to the Austrian margrave Henry Jasomirgott. King Conrad died in February 1152 and a few weeks later his nephew Frederick was elected King of the Romans, probably with the support of late Henry the Proud's son Henry the Lion.

The young king and Henry the Lion were cousins through Frederick's mother Judith of Bavaria, sister of Henry the Proud. Frederick prepared for a campaign to Rome to be crowned Holy Roman Emperor and in order to gain military support wished to end the conflict he had inherited from his uncle. He called for a diet at Würzburg —however, Henry Jasomirgott, who anticipated the king's intentions, did not appear under the pretext that he had not been duly summoned. After several attempts to make an arrangement, Frederick left for Italy and was crowned Emperor on 18 June 1155.

Back in Germany, Frederick resolved upon returning the Duchy of Bavaria to Henry the Lion. He finally was able to hold a secret meeting with Henry Jasomirgott on 5 June 1156 near the Bavarian capital Regensburg. After the conditions were fixed, the emperor called for another diet in Regensburg on 8 September, where the Babenberger officially renounced the Bavarian duchy, which passed to the Welf Henry the Lion. To make up for the loss, Austria with the explicit consent by the Princes of the Holy Roman Empire, led by Duke Vladislaus II of Bohemia, was raised to the status of a duchy. Frederick thereby avoided the degradation of Henry Jasomirgott to the rank of a margrave, which would have lacked any explanation and furthermore would have exposed Henry Jasomirgott to persecution by the Welfs. On the other hand, Henry the Lion only received a diminished Bavarian duchy and Henry Jasomirgott's right of libertas affectandi would prevent any succession of the House of Welf in Austria. Disappointed, Henry the Lion turned to his Saxon estates in Northern Germany.

Frederick prevailed, settling the long-time conflict, keeping the Welfs covered and securing support by the House of Babenberg. Only much later, the document turned out to be the founding act for what was to become a nation. 1156 is therefore sometimes given as Austria's date of independence, which it gained from Bavaria.

== Application ==
=== 13th century succession crisis ===
Because the Babenberg Austria was inheritable by female lines, two rival candidates emerged after the last male Babenberg Frederick II, Duke of Austria, Styria and Carinthia died in 1246.

- Herman VI, Margrave of Baden (died 1250), second husband of Gertrude of Babenberg, the daughter of the late Henry of Mödling, the elder brother of the now late Duke Frederick. She was the primogenitural heir of Duke Frederick and the entire Babenberg line of Dukes of Austria. Her first husband Vladislav of Bohemia, Margrave of Moravia (died 1247) had already claimed the Austrian duchy against duke Frederick, as Gertrude was heiress of the elder brother. After Herman's death, her third husband Roman, Prince of Novogrudok (married 1252, divorced 1253) continued the claim in 1252-53. And then Gertrude and Herman's son Frederick I, Margrave of Baden's claim was asserted to the Babenberg inheritance, but he was killed in 1268, leaving a sister (the future Countess of Heunburg) to continue the line.
- King Ottokar II of Bohemia (1233–78), since 1252 husband of the (childless) Margaret of Babenberg, dowager Queen of the Romans and the only surviving sister of Duke Frederick. By proximity of blood, she was the closest surviving relative of the last duke. Ottokar and Margaret were proclaimed Duke and Duchess of Austria. However, Margaret was barren and they got divorced in 1260, Ottokar marrying a younger woman. Margaret died in 1267 and left no children (so her heiress would be Gertrude again) - but Ottokar kept Austria, Styria etc. claiming to be the heir designated by Margaret in their divorce settlement. He held the duchies until deposed by king Rudolf I of Germany in 1276.

=== 18th century succession crisis ===
The Pragmatic Sanction of 1713 was partially based on provisions of the Privilegium Minus of Austria. Although not given to the Habsburgs but to the Babenbergs, it anyway allowed female heirs to succeed in Austria, and it designated to the Duke the right to name a successor in absence of heirs. It led to the War of Austrian Succession.

== See also ==
- Privilegium Maius
