= Henry, Count of Pfannberg =

- Born: before 1241
- Died: 24 July 1282
- Noble family: House of Pfannberg
- Spouse: Agnes of Plain-Hardegg
- Father: Ulrich II, Count of Pfannberg
- Mother: Last Countess of Lebenau

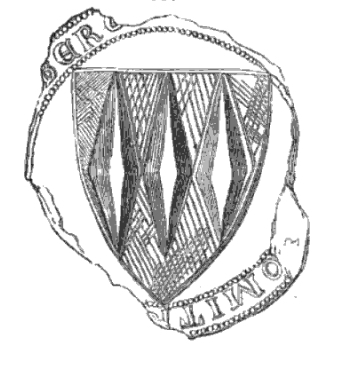
Heinrich von Pfannenberg 1264.jpg

Henry, Count of Pfannberg (before 1241 – 24 July 1282) was a Count of Pfannberg. He was the Governor of Styria from 1253 to 1254 and high judge of Styria from 1276 to 1279.

== Life ==
He was a son of Count Ulrich II (d. 1249) and the last Countess of Lebenau. He played a prominent rôle in the political life in Styria in the chaotic period between the death of Frederick II, the last Duke of Austria from the House of Babenberg in 1246 and the death of Ottokar II of Bohemia in 1278. Henry's role was much more prominent than that of his brothers Ulrich, Bernard and Siegfried.

In the dispute between Philip of Spanheim, who had been elected as Archbishop of Salzburg, and Count Meinhard I of Gorizia and Tyrol, Henry and his brother Bernard initially sided with Philip of Spanheim, in order to protect their fiefs in Carinthia, Styria and Salzburg. A deed of their alliance has survived, which was sealed on 1 June 1250 in Fohnsdorf; a number of vassals of the Pfannbergs are named as guarantors. Their stance in later years is less clear. Henry was bribed by King Bela IV of Hungary, who attempted to make his son Duke of Styria. In 1252, Ulrich sided with Ottokar, who was ruling Austria by then. Ulrich allegedly acted on behalf of all four brothers.

In 1253 Ottokar had settled himself in Styria. He appointed Henry as governor of Styria and returned to Bohemia. Bela IV then attacked Bohemia, and in the war that followed, Ottokar's father, King Wenceslaus I of Bohemia, was killed. The war was ended by the Treaty of Buda of 1254, in which Ottokar ceded Styria to Bela.

== Marriage and issue ==
In 1260, Henry married Agnes of Plain-Hardegg, the daughter (or sister) of Count Conrad III (1230-1260). Agnes' mother was Euphemia of Ortenburg. Agnes is last mentioned in a record dated 10 April 1298 in Ehrenhausen, when she donated her dower, namely Loschental Castle in the Lavant Valley and the tower in Lavamünd with all appurtenances, to the Archbishopric of Salzburg, in return for the archbishop praying for the salvation of her soul.

Henry and Agnes had three children:

- Herman (d. 1287), married Elisabeth, a daughter of Ulrich II of Heunburg and Agnes of Baden, and secondly, after 1297, with Henry II of Hohenlohe
- Rainold (d. 1292), abbot of Rein Abbey (1280-1292)
- Ulrich IV (1261 – after 1318), married Margaret (1268 – 8 December 1292), another daughter of Ulrich II of Heunburg and Agnes of Baden
