= Alland =

- Municipality
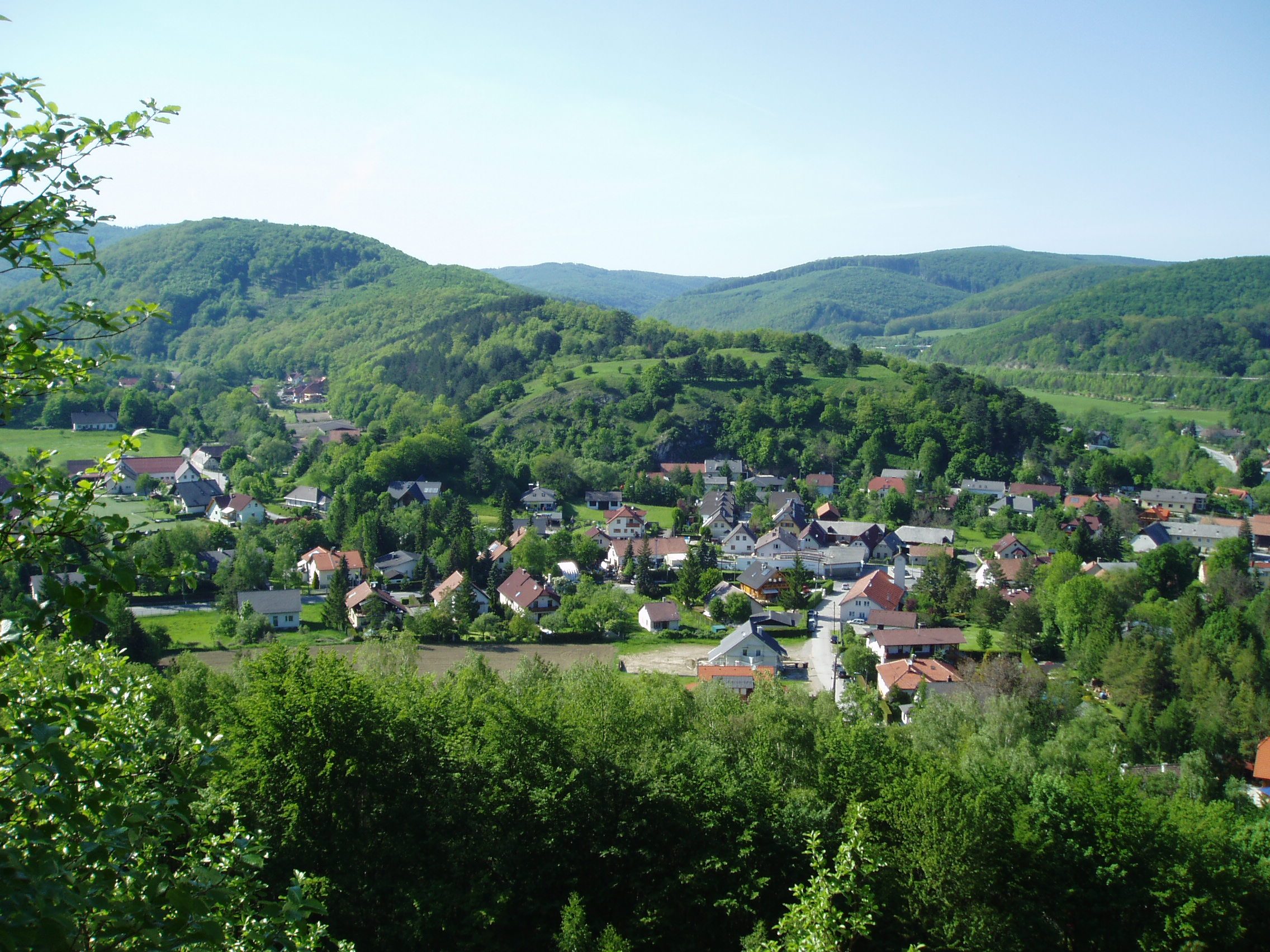

- Coat of arms

- Location within Austria
- Coordinates: 48°4′N 16°5′E
- Country: Austria
- State: Lower Austria
- District: Baden

Government
  - Mayor: Johann Grundner

Area
  - Total: 68.71 km^{2} (26.53 sq mi)
- Elevation: 331 m (1,086 ft)

Population (2018-01-01)
  - Total: 2,622
  - Density: 38.16/km^{2} (98.83/sq mi)
- Time zone: UTC+1 (CET)
  - Summer (DST): UTC+2 (CEST)
- Postal code: 2534
- Area code: 02258
- Website: www.alland.at

Alland is a market town in the district of Baden in the Austrian state of Lower Austria.

== Geography ==
It is located in the Industrieviertel region of Lower Austria, about 20 km (12 mi) southwest of the Austrian capital Vienna. Alland is situated in a valley of the Vienna Woods (Wienerwald) mountain range and recreation area. The municipal area comprises the village of Mayerling with its hunting lodge, today a Carmelite monastery.

The present-day municipality was formed in 1972 by the merger of Alland and Raisenmarkt comprising the cadastral communities of Alland, Glashütten, Groisbach, Innerer Kaltenbergerforst and Äußerer Kaltenbergerforst, Mayerling, Pöllerhof, Raisenmarkt, Rohrbach, Schwechatbach, Weissenweg, and Windhaag. It is the largest municipality in Baden District by area.

== History ==
Archaeological excavations of Linear Pottery artifacts indicate that the valley had been settled since the Neolithic era. A first church in Alland was erected in the 8th century.

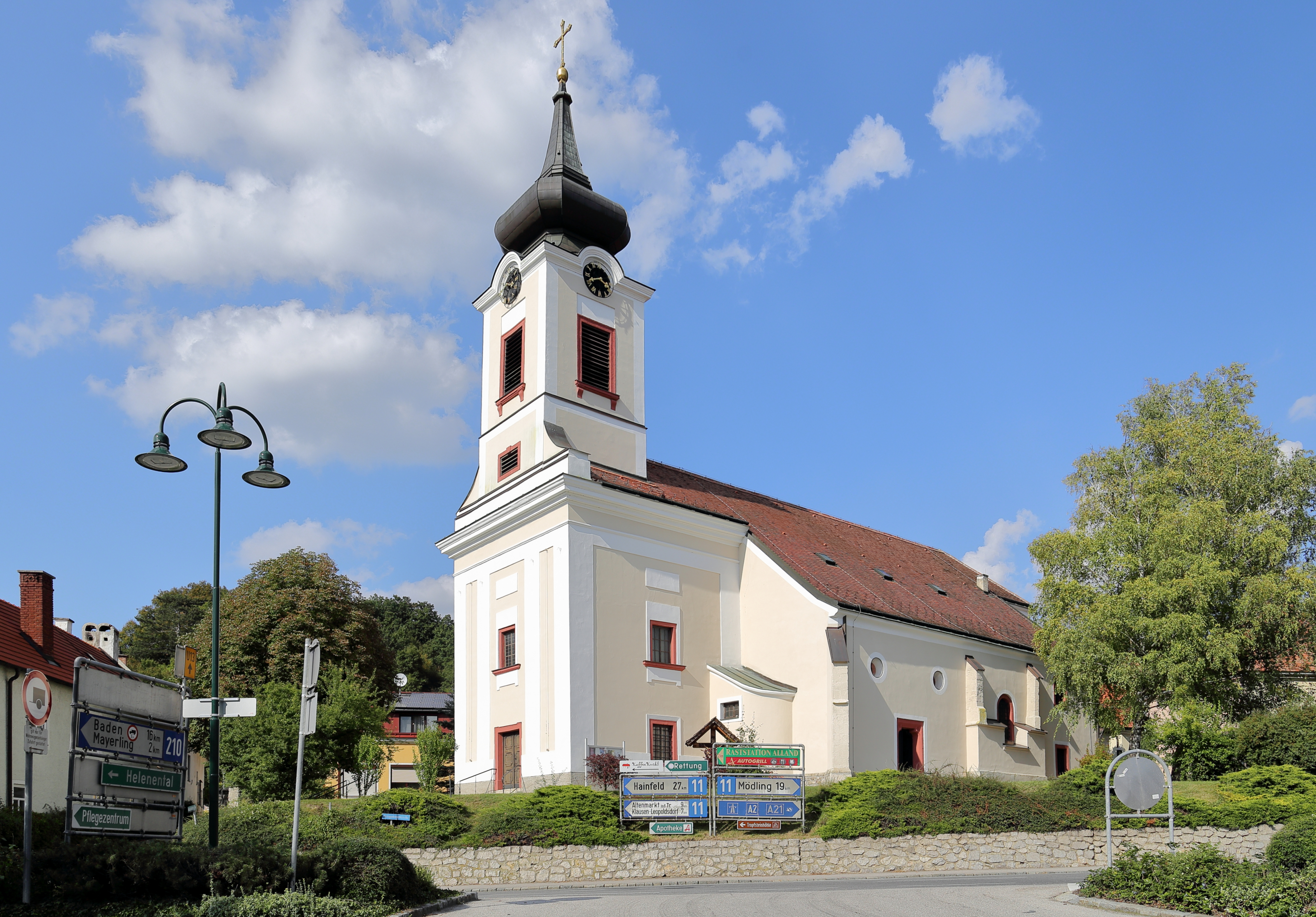
Sts George and Margareta parish church

In 1002 King Henry II of Germany enfeoffed large estates around Alland (derived from Adel, aristocratic land) up to the Triesting River to the Babenberg margrave Henry I of Austria. The Sts George and Margareta parish church was first mentioned in 1123. In 1133 Margrave Leopold III founded nearby Heiligenkreuz Abbey.

Alland remained a possession of the Babenberg rulers after their march was elevated to the Duchy of Austria and the place where the last male heir Frederick I of Austria, son of Gertrude of Babenberg, was born in 1249. Frederick however was not able to assert his claims; he and his friend Conradin of Hohenstaufen were beheaded by order of King Charles I of Naples in 1268. The Babenberg hereditary lands were taken over by King Ottokar II of Bohemia and seized by the Habsburg king Rudolf I of Germany in 1276. The parish was incorporated into Heiligenkreuz Abbey at the behest of Pope Urban VI in 1386.

Held by the Lords of Kottingbrunn from 1507, the lands were devastated by Ottoman forces during the 1529 Siege of Vienna and again in the course of the Battle of Vienna in 1683. The Mayerling hunting lodge, a Heiligenkreuz possession since 1550, was acquired by Archduke Rudolf of Austria, the heir to the Austro-Hungarian crown, in 1886. Three years later it saw the Mayerling Incident occur, when Rudolf and his beloved killed themselves here. Immediately afterwards Rudolf's father Emperor Franz Joseph ordered the conversion of the hunting lodge into a monastery which he committed to Carmelite nuns to pray for his son's salvation.

Since the fin de siècle, Alland has been converted to a tourist resort and a spa town that is a favorite of the nearby Vienna residents. After the Anschluss annexation of Austria by Nazi Germany, the Mayerling monastery was dissolved, the nuns expelled, and the premises turned into a forced labour camp in connection with the construction of the nearby Reichsautobahn. In the late days of World War II the Alland area saw heavy fighting between the I SS Panzer Corps under the command of General Josef Dietrich and Red Army forces of the 6th Guards Tank Army under Marshal Fyodor Tolbukhin from 4 to 22 April 1945.

After the war, the demolished Mayerling monastery was restored to the Carmelites and the destroyed buildings were reconstructed. In the 1950s and 60s Alland regained its status as a popular destination for daytrippers and commuters from and to Vienna. The municipality was elevated to a market town in 2002.

== Politics ==
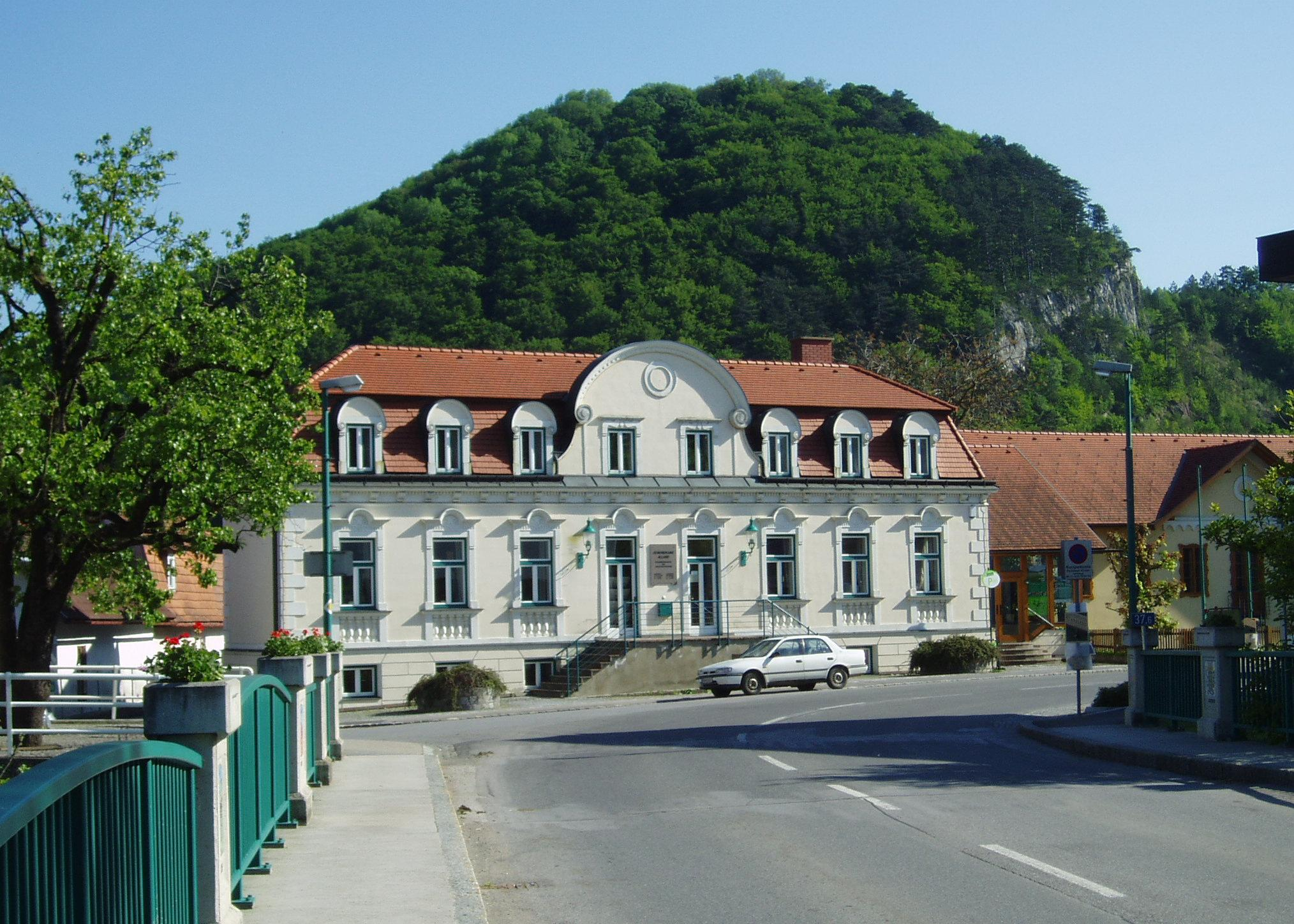
Town hall

Seats in the municipal assembly (Gemeinderat) as of 2010 elections:

- Austrian People's Party (ÖVP): 13
- Social Democratic Party of Austria (SPÖ): 6
- Freedom Party of Austria (FPÖ): 1
- ALL (Independent): 1

== Notable people ==
- Frederick I, Margrave of Baden (1249-1268).
- Leopold von Schrötter (1837–1908), internist and laryngologist, opened the Alland lung clinic in 1898.
