= Frederick I, Margrave of Baden =

Margrave of Baden and of Verona from 1250 to 1268

Frederick I
- Margrave of Baden
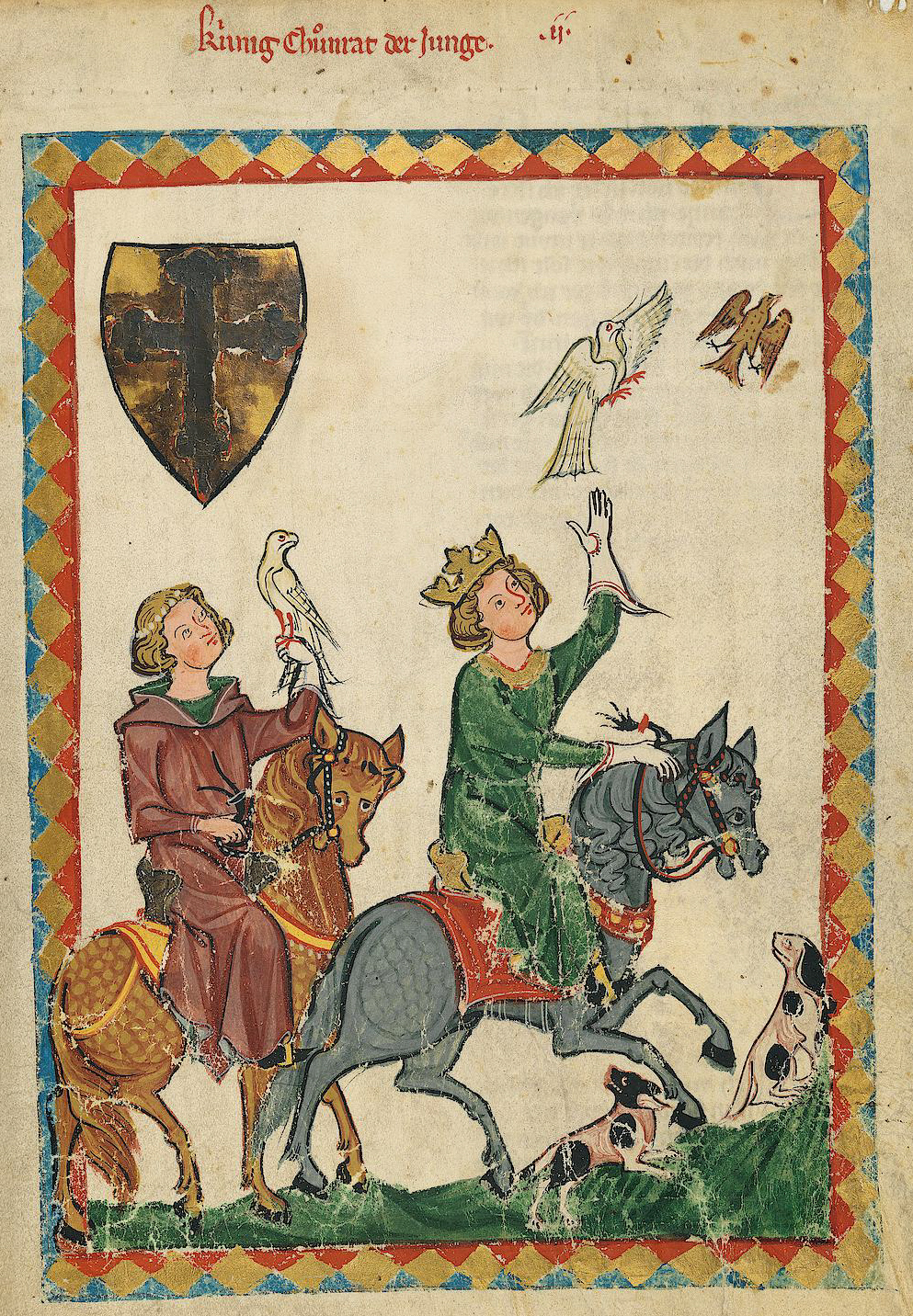
- Falconry hunt of Frederick and King Conradin, Codex Manesse (c. 1305)
- Born: 1249 or 1250; Alland, Austria
- Died: 29 October 1268 (aged 18/19); Naples, Kingdom of Sicily
- Buried: Santa Maria del Carmine, Naples
- Noble family: House of Zähringen
- Spouse: Kunigunde of Eberstein
- Father: Herman VI, Margrave of Baden
- Mother: Gertrude of Austria

Frederick I of Baden (1249 or 1250 – October 29, 1268), a member of the House of Zähringen, was Margrave of Baden and of Verona, as well as claimant Duke of Austria from 1250 until his death. As a fellow campaigner of the Hohenstaufen king Conradin, he likewise was beheaded at the behest of King Charles I of Naples.

== Claim to Austria ==
He was born in Austrian Alland, the only son of the Swabian margrave Herman VI of Baden (c.1226–1250) and his wife Gertrude (1226–1288), niece and heiress of the late Babenberg duke Frederick II of Austria.

As Duke Frederick II of Austria had been killed at the 1246 Battle of the Leitha River, the ducal line of the Babenberg dynasty had become extinct. Margrave Herman VI of Baden, through his marriage with Gertrude, had raised inheritance claims to the Austrian and Styrian possessions. However, after the death of Emperor Frederick II in 1250, no strong Imperial authority existed to assert his title. Though he was backed by Pope Innocent IV and anti-king William of Holland, Herman could not prevail against the claims raised by the mighty Přemyslid king Wenceslaus I of Bohemia and his warlike son Ottokar II.

At the time of the death of his father, young Frederick stayed at the Meissen court, where his mother Gertrude had fled. He could succeed Margrave Herman in Baden, with his uncle Rudolf I acting as regent. Also claimant to the Austrian and Styrian duchies through his mother, Frederick took his residence near Vienna. However, when in 1252 Ottokar II married Gertrude's aunt Margaret and moved into Austria, he again had to flee, at first to Styria and later to the Sponheim court in Carinthia.

== Association with Conradin ==
From about 1266, Frederick grew up at the Wittelsbach residence of Duke Louis II of Bavaria, where he became friends with Conradin, Duke of Swabia, the young son of King Conrad IV of Germany and heir to the Imperial Hohenstaufen dynasty. From him Frederick expected support in enforcing his claims to power.

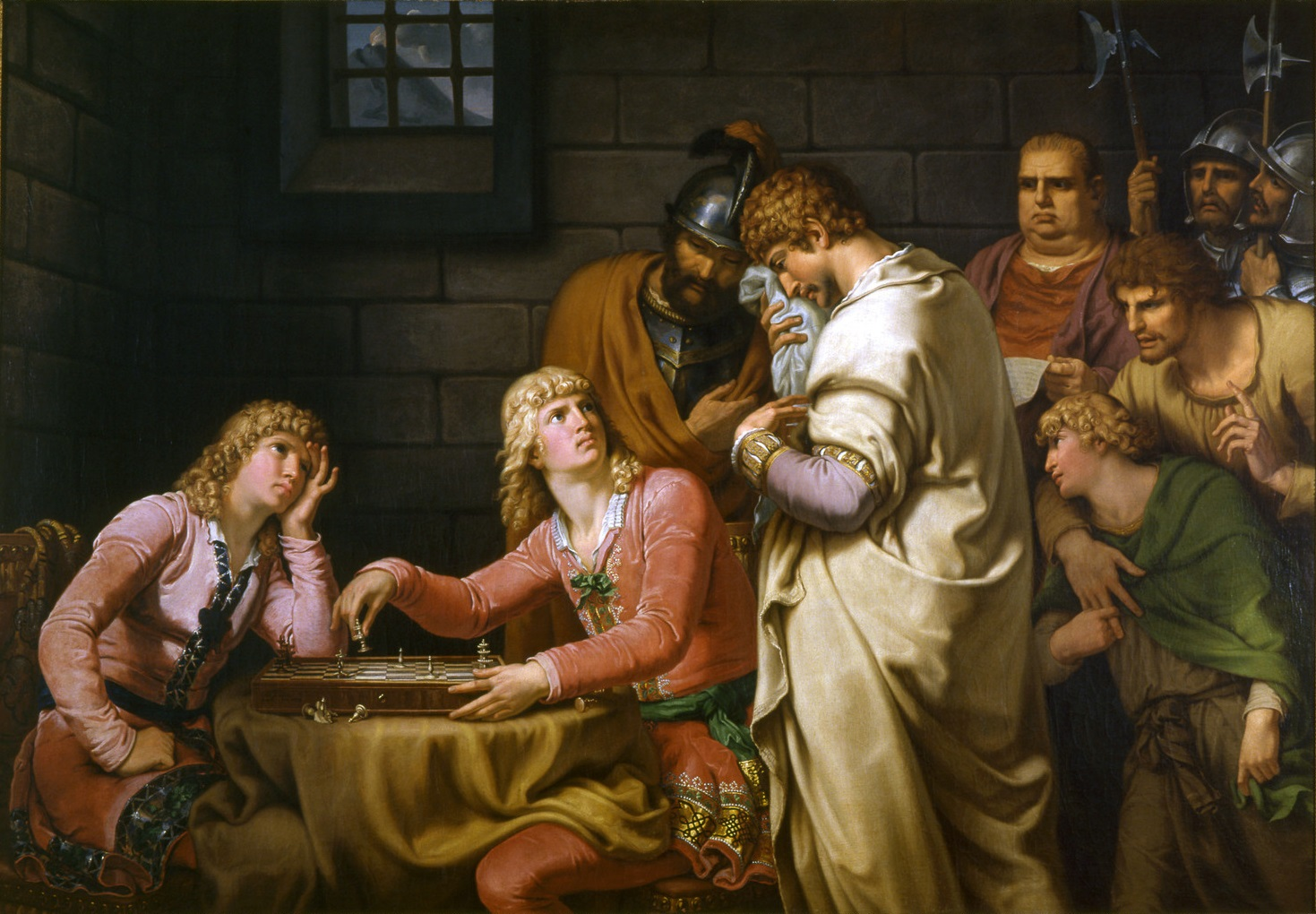
Conradin and Frederick hearing their death sentence while playing chess; history painting by J.H.W. Tischbein (1784)

In 1267 he made the fatal decision to accompany Conradin on his expedition against Charles of Anjou, who had been crowned King of Sicily by Pope Clement IV and killed Conradin's uncle Manfred in the 1266 Battle of Benevento. Conradin had moved into Rome on 24 July 1268, however, Charles decisively defeated the Hohenstaufen troops at the Battle of Tagliacozzo on 23 August, whereafter Conradin and Frederick fled and passed into captivity on 8 September at Torre Astura, south of Anzio. Betrayed and handed over to King Charles by their Frangipani followers, both remained in degrading imprisonment at Castel dell'Ovo in Naples. The king himself condemned them to death; according to legend, they heard their verdict while playing chess and indifferently continued the game. Conradin and Frederick were publicly beheaded in the Piazza del Mercato on 29 October.

Their mortal remains were at first hastily buried, but later transferred to the church of Santa Maria del Carmine, Naples, at the behest of Conradin's mother Elisabeth of Bavaria. Pope Clement died a month after the execution; Charles, though, was expelled from his kingdom in the Sicilian Vespers of 1282.

Frederick I, Margrave of Baden House of Zähringen Born: 1249 Died: 29 October 1268
Preceded by Herman VI	Margrave of Baden; 1250–1268 with Rudolf I	Succeeded by Rudolf I
Preceded by Herman VI	Duke of Austria; Duke of Styria (claimant); 1250–1268	Succeeded by Ottokar II of Bohemia
