= Agnes of Baden, Duchess of Carinthia =

13th-century German noblewoman

Agnes of Baden (1250 – 2 January 1295), was a German noblewoman by birth member of the House of Baden and by her two marriages Duchess of Carinthia and Countess of Heunburg.

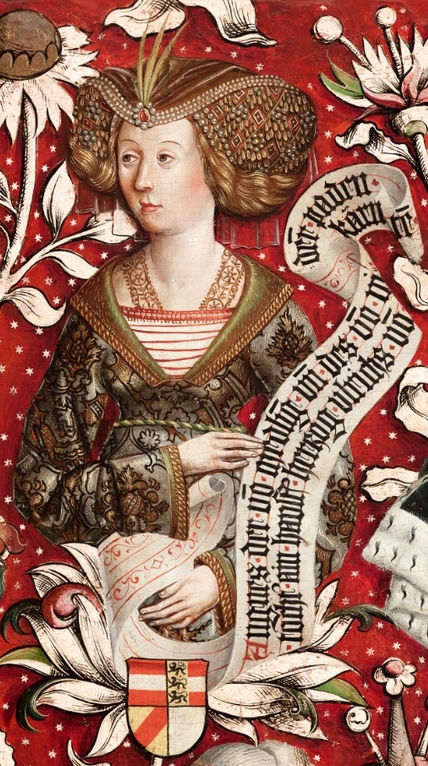
Agnes of Austria, duchess of Carinthia

She was the second child of Herman VI, Margrave of Baden and his wife Gertrude, Duchess of Mödling, titular Duchess of Austria and Styria as the last member of the House of Babenberg. For her maternal ancestry, some historians consider Agnes as the last descendant of the Babenbergs.

== Life ==
Shortly after her birth, her father died (4 October 1250) and her mother lost her inheritance when her aunt Margaret and her husband, Prince Ottokar of Bohemia (later King), were chosen rulers of Austria and Styria.

During her childhood, Agnes lived in Meissen, Saxony, together with her mother, older brother Frederick, and her youngest half-sister Maria Romanovna of Halicz (born from Gertrude's third brief marriage with a Rurikid prince).

In 1263 Agnes (aged 13) married with the widower Ulrich III, Duke of Carinthia and landgrave of Carniola, a member of the House of Sponheim and thirty years her senior. They had no children.

On 29 October 1268, Agnes' brother and his friend Conradin were executed in Naples. King Ottokar II of Bohemia, after taking possession of the Duchies of Austria and Styria, wanted to eliminate all possible contenders to his power, and played an ambiguous role in this event. On 4 December of that year, the Bohemian ruler also compelled Ulrich III to sign a secret treaty in the city of Poděbrady, under which Ottokar II inherited all his lands and dignities in the - likely - case of his childless death, excluding the next and last surviving legitimate member of his family, his younger brother Philip, former Archbishop of Salzburg and ruling Count of Lebenau. Finally, in 1269 Ottokar II also confined Gertrude into a definitive exile in Meissen, where she died in 1288.

After the death of Duke Ulrich III on 27 October 1269, Agnes was married in 1271 to Count Ulrich II of Heunburg "in depressionem generis" (unequal match under the House of Babenberg). The House of Heunburg, originally only a Carinthian noble family raised to the rank of Ministerialis by Duke Ulrich III, wasn't befitted to a union with a member of the Baden and Babenberg houses. However, King Ottokar II rewarded Count Ulrich II in this way for his support after he took the Duchy of Carinthia.

Despite this difficult beginning together, Ulrich II and Agnes apparently had a happy marriage, especially when the Count of Heunburg gradually took his distance from the Bohemian king. They had five children:

- Catherine (died 1316), married Ulrich of Sanneck, they are the ancestors of the Counts of Celje.
- Frederick (died 1317), Count of Heunburg, Vogt of Gornji Grad. Married Adelaide (of Auffenstein?), childless.
- Hermann (died 1322), Count of Heunburg, last male member of the family. Married Elisabeth of Görz, childless.
- Margaret (died after 8 December 1308), married firstly Leopold I, Lord of Sanneck and secondly Ulrich IV, Count of Pfannberg.
- Elisabeth (died 1329), married firstly Count Hermann of Pfannberg and secondly Count Henry of Hohenlohe.

Later, the Count and Countess of Heunburg tried together to take advantage of the chaotic situation in Carinthia and claimed part of Agnes' dower lands retained by Ottokar, mainly the County of Pernegg with the city of Drosendorf and other properties, but finally they were forced to surrender by the Bohemian King. Only in 1279 King Rudolph I of Germany -after the defeat and death of King Ottokar II- was able to recognize their claims or at least partially compensated for them (Pfandhingabe in 1279 and the Einlösung of 1287, both issued by Rudolph I's heir Albert, then ruling Duke of Austria and Styria).

These concessions were, however, too small to appease Agnes and her husband, who joined a revolt against the new ruler of Carinthia, Meinhard II of Görz and his Habsburg allies after king Rudolf's death. After Ulrich's defeat against the Habsburg-Görz coalition in 1292, she followed him into exile in Wiener Neustadt, where she died in 1295. She is buried in the town's Minorites Church.
