= Duchy of Austria =

State of the Holy Roman Empire (1156–1453)

Coordinates: 48°13′N 16°22′E

Duchy of Austria Austriae Ducatus (Latin) Herzogtum Österreich (Middle High German)
- 1156–1453
- Banner of arms Ducal Shield

- Map of the Austrian duchy in the 13th century: Austria proper shown in solid red, the Duchy of Styria, an Austrian possession since 1192, in hatched red. The pale highlighted area roughly corresponds with the anachronistic Austrian Circle (est. 1512), and is merely for context. The rest of the Holy Roman Empire is shown in pale orange.
- Status: Duchy within the Holy Roman Empire
- Capital: Vienna
- Common languages: Austro-Bavarian; German; Medieval Latin
- Religion: Roman Catholicism
- Demonym: Austrian
- Duke of Austria
  - 1141–1177: Henry II (first duke, from 1156)
  - 1230–1246: Frederick II (last Babenberg duke)
  - 1251–1276: Ottokar (Přemyslid dynasty)
  - 1282–1291: Albert I (first Habsburg duke)
  - 1440–1457: Ladislaus I (last duke, archduke from 1453)
- Historical era: Middle Ages
  - Privilegium Minus: 17 September 1156
  - Georgenberg Pact: 17 August 1186
  - Battle on the Marchfeld: 26 August 1278
  - Privilegium Maius: 1358/59
  - Treaty of Neuberg: 25 September 1379
  - Archduchy recognized: 6 January 1453
Preceded by	Succeeded by
Margraviate of Austria; Duchy of Styria under Babenbergs	Archduchy of Austria

The Duchy of Austria (Latin: Austriae Ducatus; Middle High German: Herzogtum Österreich) was a medieval principality of the Holy Roman Empire, established in 1156 by the Privilegium Minus, when the Margraviate of Austria (Ostarrîchi) was detached from Bavaria and elevated to a duchy in its own right. After the ruling dukes of the House of Babenberg became extinct in the male line, there was as much as three decades of rivalry on inheritance and rulership, until the German king Rudolf I took over the dominion as the first monarch of the Habsburg dynasty in 1276. Thereafter, Austria became the patrimony and ancestral homeland of the dynasty and the nucleus of the Habsburg monarchy. In 1453, the archducal title of the Austrian rulers, invented by Duke Rudolf IV in the forged Privilegium Maius of 1359, was officially acknowledged by the Habsburg emperor Frederick III.

== Geography ==
Initially, the duchy was comparatively small in area, roughly comprising the modern-day Austrian state of Lower Austria. As a former border march, it was located on the eastern periphery of the Empire, on the northern and southern shores of the Danube River, east of ("below") the Enns tributary.

Drosendorf, Raabs, Laa and other fortifications along the Thaya River, north of the historic Waldviertel and Weinviertel regions and separated by the Manhartsberg range, marked the border with the Duchy of Bohemia (elevated to a Kingdom in 1198) and the Moravian lands, both of which were held by the Czech Přemyslid dynasty. In the east, the Imperial border with the Kingdom of Hungary (present-day Slovakia) had gradually shifted towards the plains of the Morava River and the eastern rim of the Vienna Basin. On the right shore of the Danube, the lower Leitha River marked the Imperial–Hungarian border for centuries. In the south, Austria bordered the Styrian lands which were likewise elevated to a duchy, and unified with Austria in 1192.

== History ==
=== Background ===
The territory originally inhabited by Celts was conquered by the Roman Empire at the end of the 1st century BC. Following the fall of the Western Roman Empire in the late 5th century, the area was invaded by several Germanic tribes and from the 6th century onward settled by Avars as well as by Slavic tribes, who about 600 founded the independent principality of Carantania in the south. The Avar Khaganate established in 567 comprised most of the later Austrian march up to the Enns river, where it bordered on the German stem duchy of Bavaria. Temporarily part of Samo's Empire from 631 to 658, the territory was under constant attack by the Carolingian forces of Charlemagne from 791 onward.

Around 800, Charlemagne, having won several victories against the Avars, established a frontier march in the region between the Enns and Raab rivers, called the Avar March, part of the marcha orientalis. The East Frankish margraviate was again lost to the invading Magyars at the 907 Battle of Pressburg, and re-established as the Bavarian March of Austria after King Otto I of Germany's victory at the 955 Battle of Lechfeld. In 976 Emperor Otto II enfeoffed the Babenberg count Leopold the Illustrious with the Austrian margraviate. A large-scale German settlement (Ostsiedlung) along the Danube down to the border with Hungary followed, which ultimately disrupted the Slavic continuity between the West Slavic (Slovak) and South Slavic (Slovene) lands.

=== House of Babenberg ===
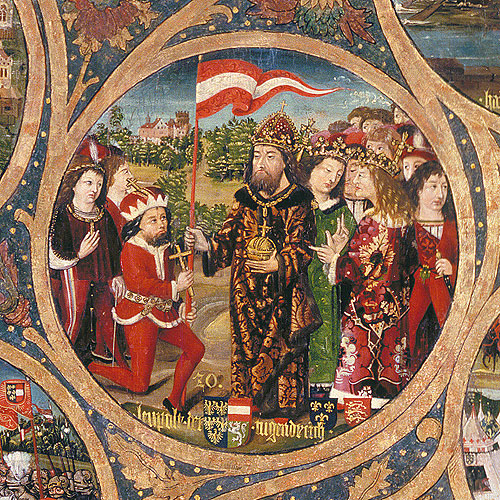
Leopold V is awarded the red-white-red banner by Emperor Henry VI, detail from the Babenberg Pedigree, Klosterneuburg

Although today closely associated with the Habsburg dynasty, Austria was, until 1246, a feudal possession of the younger House of Babenberg. Margrave Leopold the Generous (1136–1141) was a loyal vassal of the imperial House of Hohenstaufen in the struggle against the Bavarian Welf dynasty. In 1139, after King Conrad III of Germany deposed the Welf duke Henry the Proud, he gave the Bavarian duchy to his half-brother Margrave Leopold. Leopold's brother and successor Henry Jasomirgott was enfeoffed with Bavaria in 1141. In 1156, Hohenstaufen Emperor Frederick Barbarossa approached a settlement with the Welfs. At the 1156 Imperial Diet in Regensburg, Henry Jasomirgott had to renounce the Bavarian duchy in favor of Henry the Lion. In compensation, the Babenberg margraviate was elevated to an equal duchy, confirmed by numerous privileges granted by the Privilegium Minus on September 17th.

The new Austrian duke took his residence at Vienna at the site of the later Hofburg Palace. He also founded Schottenstift Abbey as the Babenberg proprietary church, settled with Irish monks. The Austrian lands prospered, due to their favorable location on the Danube, as an important trade route from Krems and Mautern via Vienna down to Hungary and the Byzantine Empire. For a short time, the Babenbergs came to be one of the most influential ruling families in the Empire, peaking under the reign of Leopold V the Virtous (1177–1194) and Leopold VI the Glorious (1194–1230). In 1186, they signed the Georgenberg Pact with the first and last Otakar duke Ottokar IV of Styria and, upon his death in 1192, acquired the adjacent Styrian lands in the south, which were ruled with Austria in personal union until 1918. They also expanded their territory into the old Bavarian lands west of the Enns River, along the Traun to the city of Linz, the future capital of Upper Austria.

In 1191, Duke Leopold V joined the Third Crusade and the siege of Acre. Once the city was conquered and occupied, he picked a fierce quarrel with King Richard the Lionheart, allegedly over Leopold's raising of his Babenberg banner beside the royal flags of Richard and Philip II of France. When the English king passed through Austria on his way home, Leopold had him abducted and arrested at Dürnstein Castle. Handed over to Emperor Henry VI, Richard was only released after paying an enormous ransom, and the duke used his share to lay out the Wiener Neustadt fortification near the Hungarian border. According to legend, the emperor granted him permission to bear the red-white-red colors that became the flag of Austria.

His son Leopold VI, sole ruler of the Austrian and Styrian lands from 1198, married the Byzantine princess Theodora Angelina and later married his daughter Margaret to Henry of Hohenstaufen, son of Emperor Frederick II, in 1225. Notable minnesingers like Reinmar von Hagenau and Walther von der Vogelweide were regular guests at the Vienna court and Middle High German poetry flourished. The poem Nibelungenlied probably arose in the Austrian lands.

However, Leopold's son, Duke Frederick II the Warlike, entered into fierce conflicts soon after his accession in 1230, not only with the Austrian nobility, but also with King Wenceslaus I of Bohemia, King Andrew II of Hungary and even with Emperor Frederick II for the alleged entanglement in the rebellion of the duke's brother-in-law Henry of Hohenstaufen. The latter earned him an Imperial ban and an expulsion from Vienna in 1236. Though he could later reconcile with the Emperor, the border conflict with Hungary culminated in several clashes of arms after 1242, after King Béla IV of Hungary marched into Austria to reconquer occupied lands. Duke Frederick was killed at the 1246 Battle of the Leitha River, whereby the Babenberg line became extinct in the male line.

=== The rule of King Ottokar ===
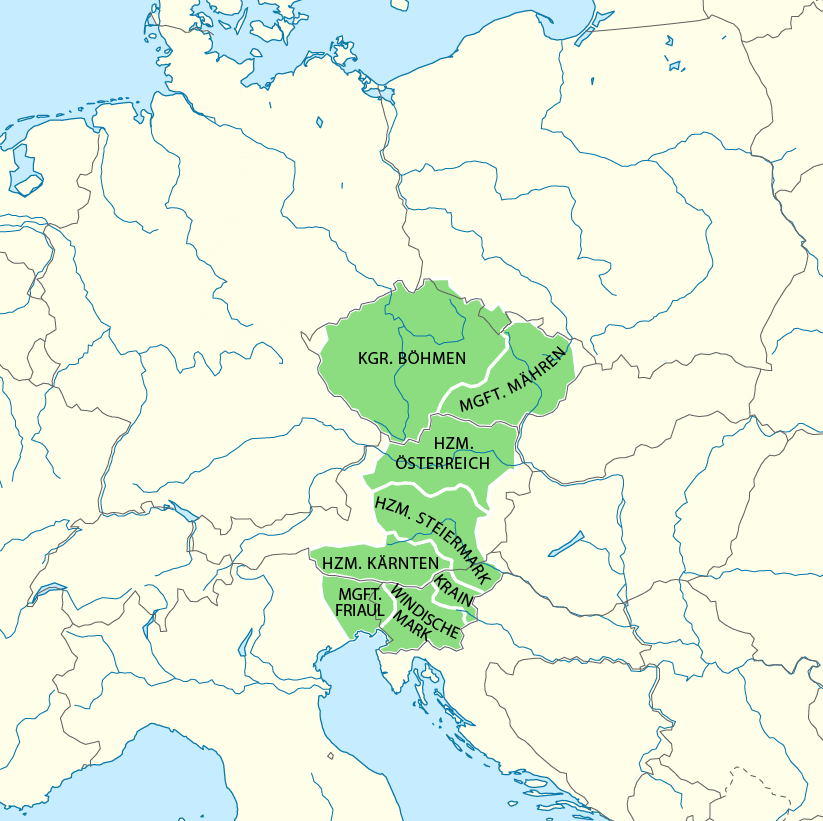
Ottokar's acquisitions until 1276, superimposed on modern European borders

According to feudal law, the immediate heritable fees fell back to the suzerain, the Holy Roman Emperor. However, Emperor Frederick II, in the last years of his rule, was weakened by the struggle against Pope Innocent IV, and was stuck in the Italian Wars between the Guelphs and Ghibellines. His death in 1250 and the death of his only surviving son King Conrad IV four years later ended the line of Hohenstaufen rulers, only eight years after the extinction of the Babenberg dynasty. The extinction led to the Great Interregnum, a period of several decades during which the status of the country's rulers was disputed. While in the following years several candidates were elected King of the Romans, none of them were able to control the Empire.

It was the ambitious Přemyslid ruler Ottokar II of Bohemia, son of King Wenceslaus I, who took the occasion to take over the rule in the "princeless" lands of late Duke Frederick II the Warlike. Referring to the Privilegium Minus, Pope Innocent IV, against the feudal principle of patrilineal inheritance, confirmed the hereditary rights of Frederick's sister Margaret, widow of Henry of Hohenstaufen, and his niece Gertrude, widow of Ottokar's elder brother Přemyslid Margrave Vladislaus of Moravia who died in 1247. Upon the death of Gertrude's second husband, Margrave Herman VI of Baden, in 1250, Ottokar invaded the Austrian lands, acclaimed by the local nobility. To substantiate his claims, he married Margaret (about 30 years his senior) in 1252. King Béla IV of Hungary contested this, referring to the Gertrude's third marriage with his relative Roman Danylovich and occupied the Styrian lands. However, Ottokar prevailed as he defeated the Hungarian troops at the Battle of Kressenbrunn. Bohemian king since 1253, he now was sole ruler of the Bohemian, Moravian, Austrian and Styrian lands—an anticipation of the early modern Habsburg monarchy after 1526.

In 1269, Ottokar also effectively controlled the Duchy of Carinthia, with Carniola and the Windic March further in the south. He controlled, in all, a Central European realm stretching from the Polish border in the Sudetes towards the Adriatic coast in the south. When he failed to be elected King of the Romans in 1273, he contested the election of the successful candidate, the Swabian count Rudolf of Habsburg. Nevertheless, Rudolf was able to secure his rule as the first actual German king after the Great Interregnum. By his Imperial authority he seized Ottokar's "alienated" territories and added them to his already extensive homelands in Swabia. King Ottokar was finally defeated and killed by the united Austrian and Hungarian forces in the 1278 Battle on the Marchfeld.

=== House of Habsburg ===
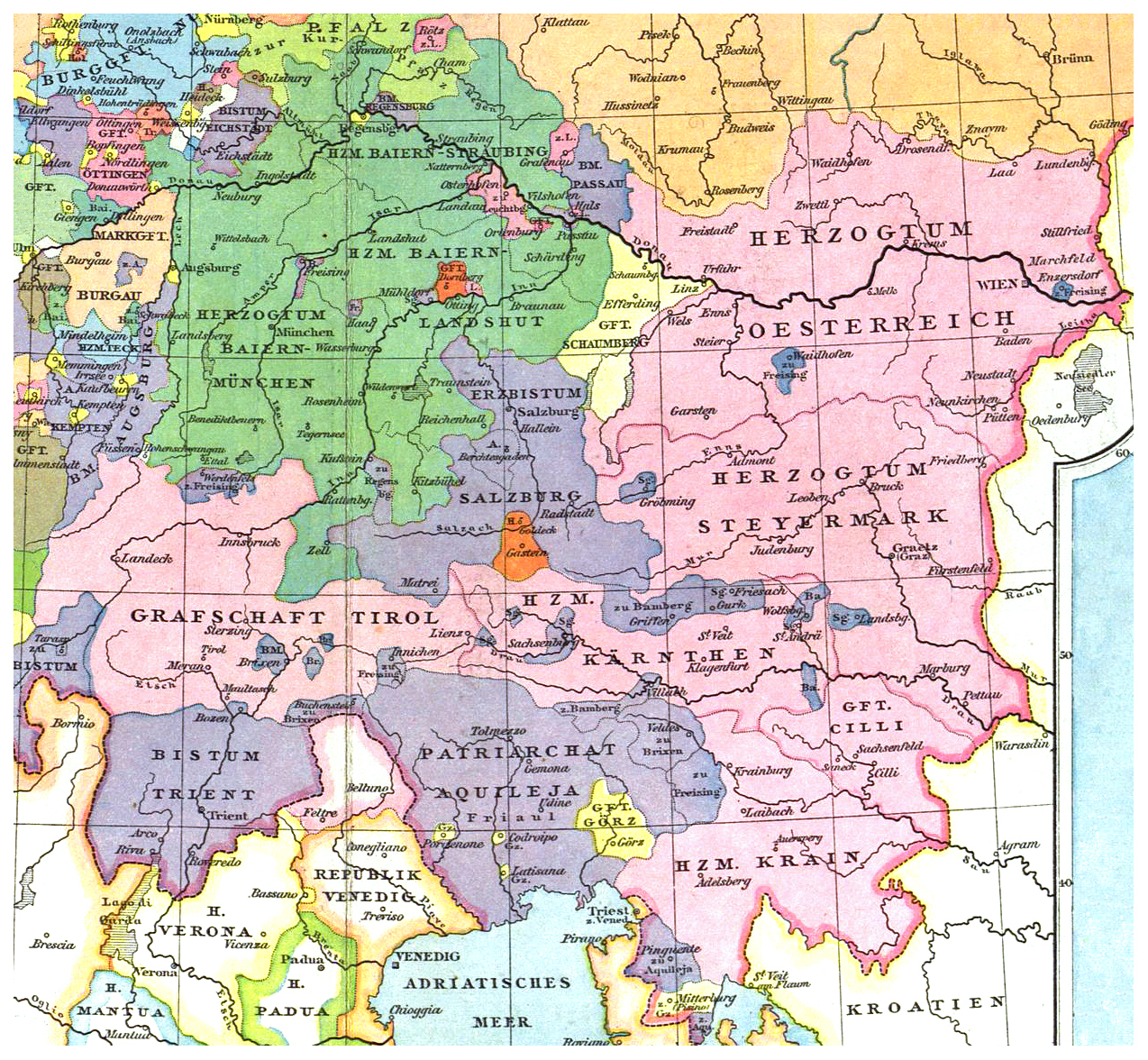
Habsburg domains in Austria, Styria, Carinthia, Carniola, Tyrol and the surrounding regions circa 1350

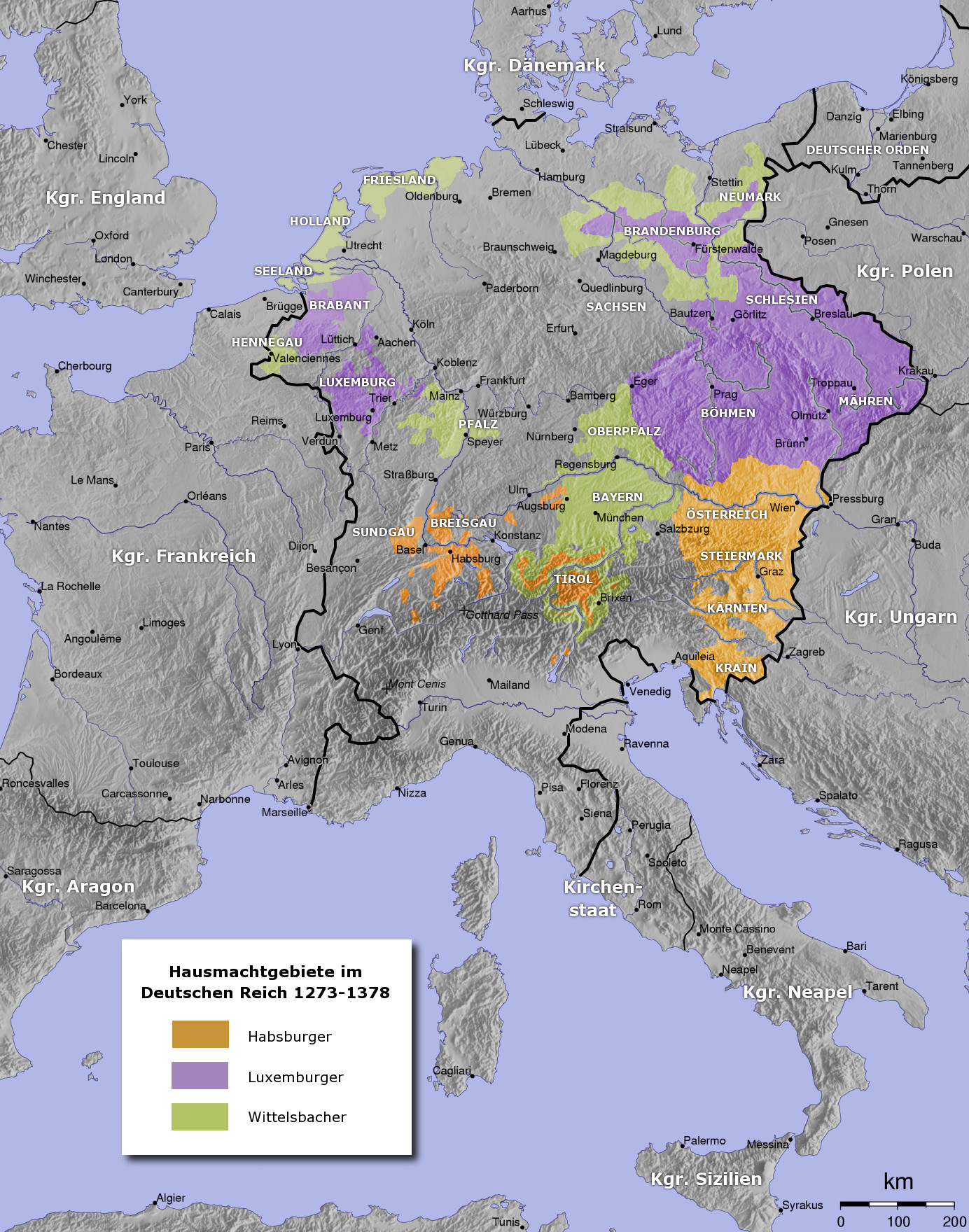
Habsburg (orange), Luxembourg (violet) and Wittelsbach (green) dominions within the Holy Roman Empire, 14th century

Rudolf married his daughter Judith off to Ottokar's son Wenceslaus II, who retained the Bohemian kingdom. Having reached an agreement with the prince-electors, he granted the Austrian domains to his sons Albert and Rudolf II at the 1282 Diet of Augsburg, elevating them to Princes of the Holy Roman Empire. The right of primogeniture was implemented with the Treaty of Rheinfelden one year later. Rudolf's descendants ruled Austria and Styria until 1918.

In the 14th and 15th centuries, the Habsburgs accumulated further provinces in the southeastern part of the Empire: the Duchy of Carinthia with the March of Carniola, initially ceded to the House of Gorizia, came under Habsburg rule in 1335; the County of Tyrol was ceded to Duke Rudolf IV of Austria by Countess Margaret in 1363. These territories, together, became known as the Habsburg 'Hereditary Lands', although they were sometimes referred to in sum as Austria. Rudolf established his residence at the Vienna Hofburg Palace and in 1358/59 he had the Privilegium Maius forged to elevate himself to a privileged "archduke" of the Empire, but failed to secure confirmation from the Emperor Charles IV.

The following two centuries were turbulent for the duchy. Under Habsburg rule, several inquisitorial persecutions against Waldensians were carried out, notably by the cleric Petrus Zwicker in the late 14th century. Following the brief, yet eventful, rule of Duke Rudolf IV, his brothers Albert III and Leopold III divided the Austrian domains between themselves, in accordance with the Treaty of Neuberg, signed in 1379. Albert retained Austria proper, while Leopold took the remaining territories. In 1402, there was another split in the Leopoldian line, when Duke Ernest took Inner Austria (i.e. the duchies of Styria, Carinthia, and Carniola) and Duke Frederick IV became the ruler of Tyrol and Further Austria. The partitions decisively weakened the Habsburg position, in favour of their rivals from the Luxembourg and Wittelsbach dynasties.

The Habsburg Albertinian line was again elevated to the Imperial throne in 1438. Duke Albert V of Austria was chosen King of the Romans as the successor to his House of Luxembourg father-in-law, Emperor Sigismund. Although Albert's reign spanned only one year, he was succeeded by his Leopoldian cousin, Duke Ernest's son, Frederick V, who eventually reunified the Habsburg territories, after the extinctions of the Albertinian line (1457) and the Elder Tyrolean line (1490). Duke Frederick was crowned Holy Roman Emperor (as Frederick III) in 1452; he formally acknowledged the elevation of Austria to an archduchy one year later, whereafter all Habsburg princes bore the archducal title. Only two non-Habsburgs , Charles VII, Holy Roman Emperor and Francis I, Holy Roman Emperor reigned the Empire between 1438 and 1806, when Emperor Francis II resigned.

== See also ==
- History of Austria
- List of rulers of Austria

== Sources ==
- Appelt, Heinrich (1977). "Die Bedeutung des Titels archidux palatinus Austriae". Festschrift Friedrich Hausmann. Graz: Akademische Druck- und Verlagsanstalt. pp. 15–20.
- Lhotsky, Alphons (1957). Privilegium maius: Die Geschichte einer Urkunde. Wien: Verlag für Geschichte und Politik.
- Sauter, Alexander (2003). Fürstliche Herrschaftsrepräsentation: Die Habsburger im 14. Jahrhundert. Ostfildern: Jan Thorbecke Verlag.
- Wilson, Peter H. (2016). Heart of Europe: A History of the Holy Roman Empire. Cambridge: Harvard University Press.
