= Gertrude of Austria =

13th-century German duchess

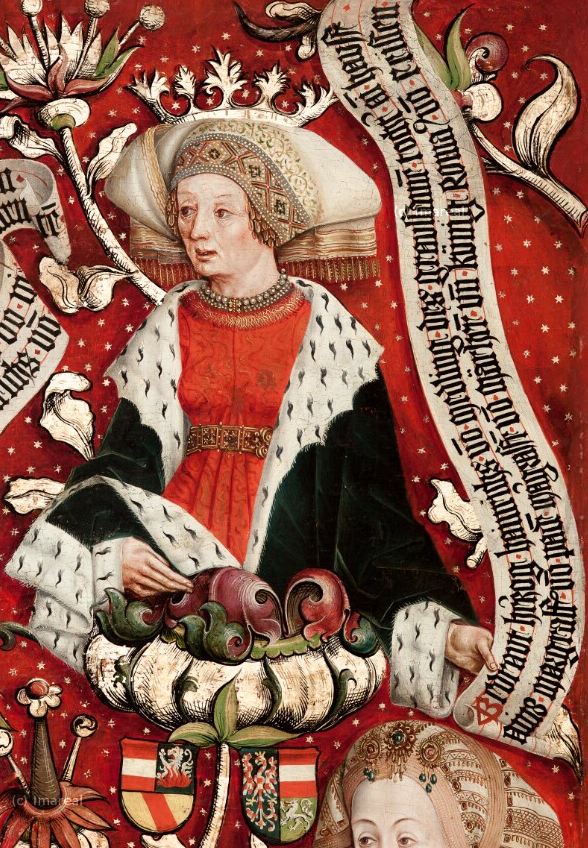
- Duchess Gertrud, Markgravine of Moravia and Baden (from the Babenberger Stammbaum kept in Klosterneuburg Abbey)

Duchess of Austria(disputed with Margaret)
- Reign: 15 June 1246-4 October 1250; 1254-1267(in parts of styria only)
- Predecessor: Frederick II of Austria
- Successor: ottokar of Bohemia
- Born: 1226
- Died: 24 April 1288 (aged 61–62); Seusslitz, Meissen, Saxony
- Noble family: Babenberg
- Spouses: Vladislaus III of Moravia (m. 1246, died 1247); Herman VI, Margrave of Baden (m. 1248, died 1250); Roman Danylovich (m. 1252)
- Issue: Frederick I, Margrave of Baden; Agnes of Baden, Duchess of Carinthia; Maria Romanovna
- Father: Henry II, Duke of Mödling
- Mother: Agnes, daughter of Hermann I, Landgrave of Thuringia

Gertrude of Austria (also named Gertrude of Babenberg) (c. 1226 – 24 April 1288) was a member of the House of Babenberg, Duchess of Mödling and later titular Duchess of Austria and Styria. She was the niece of Duke Frederick II of Austria, the last male member of the Babenberg dynasty. She was, according to the Privilegium Minus decree the first in line to inherit the Duchies of Austria and Styria after the death of childless Frederick, but these claims were disputed by her aunt Margaret of Austria, Queen of Bohemia.

== Early years ==
Gertrude was born in 1226 and was the only child of Henry II, Duke of Mödling, by his wife Agnes, daughter of Hermann I, Landgrave of Thuringia. Henry of Mödling was the second son of Leopold VI, Duke of Austria. In 1216, after the death of his older brother Leopold, Henry became his father's heir.

Henry died on 26 September 1228, only twenty years old and without male issue. Two years later, on 28 July 1230, Henry's father Duke Leopold VI also died and was succeeded by Frederick II, Leopold's third son. Because Babenberg Austria was inheritable by females according to the provisions of Privilegium Minus, Gertrude disputed Frederick's ascension, claiming Austria as her inheritance as the only child of Leopold VI's eldest son. Even so, Gertrude's claim was eventually bypassed in her uncle's favor.

Despite this negative turn of events, Gertrude inherited her father's Duchy of Mödling and was placed under the guardianship of her uncle, Frederick II, who, after two unhappy marriages, remained childless. This made Gertrude the primogenitural heiress of the entire Babenberg line of Dukes of Austria and Styria.

== Marriage to Vladislaus III of Moravia ==
Complicating Frederick II's hold over Austria was his long-standing quarrel with Frederick II, Holy Roman Emperor, during which he was placed under an imperial ban. In 1245, in a spectacular change of imperial politics, Frederick II of Austria became one of the emperor's most important allies when negotiations regarding the elevation of Vienna to a bishopric and of Austria (including Styria) to a Kingdom were initiated. One condition effecting a positive outcome was that the 19-year-old Duke's niece, Gertrude, would marry the 51-year-old Emperor who was a widower three times over. Though desirous of the union, Wenceslaus I of Bohemia voiced his concerns given a pre-existing agreement that Gertrude marry his eldest son and heir Vladislaus III of Moravia. Gertrude herself refused the marriage with the aged Emperor, citing his recent excommunication by the Pope. Other sources claim that she was in love with Vladislaus. After sending an army to Austria in order to pressure Duke Frederick II into agreeing to the union of Gertrude and Vladislaus, the two parties came to terms early in June 1245 in Verona.

On 15 June 1246 Duke Frederick II was killed in battle at Leitha, Hungary. King Wenceslaus quickly arranged the formal marriage ceremony of Gertrude and his heir, Vladislaus. Per hoc Wladislaus habebat Austriae ducatum cheered Bohemia and, supported by the rights of his wife and the prospect of inheriting the Bohemian throne, Vladislaus was recognized as Duke by the Austrian aristocracy. Shortly after their marriage, Vladislaus died on 3 January 1247 before he could take possession of the duchy.

== Marriage to Herman VI, Margrave of Baden ==
In 1248, in order to bolster her claims, the 22-year-old Duchess married Herman VI, Margrave of Baden. The following year Gertrude gave birth to a son Frederick I, Margrave of Baden. In celebration of the happy event, Gertrude gave 30 people in Alland, the place of her son's birth, extended farm lands which became the foundation of the agrarian community of the Allander Urhausbesitzer. In 1250 Gertrude had a second child, a daughter, whom she named Agnes after her maternal grandmother.

Herman was able to maintain only minimal control in the duchies, failing ultimately to defeat the opposition of the Austrian aristocracy. As a result, Gertrude and her children fled to Meissen in Saxony and her relationship with Herman deteriorated significantly. Gertrude was suspected of poisoning Herman when he died on 4 October 1250.

== Marriage to Roman Danylovich ==
Gertrude lost the favour of the curia and with it the chance to recover the Babenberg dominions of Austria and Styria when she refused to marry the brother of Count William II of Holland, Floris, who was also the favoured candidate of Pope Innocent IV. In the meantime, her aunt and competitor for the duchies of Austria and Styria, Margaret, married Ottokar of Bohemia, the second son and next heir of Wenceslaus I. The aristocracy accepted Margaret and Ottokar as the rulers of Austria.

On 12 July 1252, having lost most of her support, Gertrude formed an alliance with Béla IV of Hungary and married his relative, Roman Danylovich, Prince of Halicz, a member of the Rurikid dynasty. In 1253, Gertrude gave birth to her only child from this union, Maria Romanovna. However, after failing to establish himself as Duke of Austria, Roman left Gertrude and their daughter to return to Hungary. Shortly after the marriage was dissolved.

Eventually, in 1254, Gertrude received a portion of Styria, 400 silver marks annually, and the towns of Voitsberg and Judenburg as her residences. In 1267, as neither Gertrude nor her son Frederick forswore their claim to the duchies of Styria and Austria, King Ottokar II dispossessed them of their lands. Ottokar was largely motivated since he sought to remarry into the Hungarian royal house; he could not expect an heir with the significantly older Margaret who was past child bearing age. That same year, the death of Margaret made Gertrude the only legitimate heir to the Babenberg dynasty.

== Later life and death ==
On 8 September 1268, Gertrude's son Frederick, who had accompanied Conradin on his Italian expedition, was captured in Astura to the south of Anzio. Handed over to Charles of Anjou, he remained in degrading imprisonment in the Castel dell'Ovo in Naples until his public beheading in the Piazza del Mercato in Naples on 29 October. The following year, Gertrude was exiled and lost her claim to Windisch-Feistritz. Again, she found refuge with her family in Meissen.

Gertrude's other claims were ultimately lost when Rudolf I of Germany granted her duchies to his own sons in 1282. Six years later, on 24 April 1288, Gertrude died in the Poor Clare convent of Saint Afra near Seusslitz in Meissen. She was buried in this monastery.

== Legacy ==
Her daughter Agnes of Baden became her mother and brother's heir, but in 1279, renounced her rights to Baden and the Duchies of Austria and Styria. From her second marriage with Count Ulrich III of Heunburg, Agnes had five children, two sons (Frederick and Herman) and three daughters (Margaret, Elisabeth and Katharina). The sons died without heirs. The eldest daughter, Katharina, married the Styrian nobleman Ulrich of Sanneck, and their son Frederick I of Cilli eventually inherited his grandfather's estates. He founded the House of Cilli, which included Holy Roman Empress Barbara of Cilli whose daughter, Elizabeth of Luxembourg, married into the House of Habsburg.

Gertrude's youngest daughter, Maria Romanovna of Halicz, born from her third marriage, married in the second half of the 1260s Joachim Gutkeled, Ban of Slavonia from 1270 to 1272 (with short interruption) and from 1276 to 1277, and three times Master of the treasury between 1272 and 1275. He was also ispán, or head, of many counties, including Baranya and Pozsony. The couple produced only a daughter, Clara, who married Roland Borsa, who served as Voivode of Transylvania in 1282 and from 1284 to 1294; they had no children.

== See also ==
- List of Austrian consorts

== Bibliography ==
- Engel, Pál (1996). Magyarország világi archontológiája, 1301–1457, I [Secular Archontology of Hungary, 1301–1457, Volume I] (in Hungarian). História, MTA Történettudományi Intézete. ISBN 963-8312-44-0.
- Markó, László (2006). A magyar állam főméltóságai Szent Istvántól napjainkig: Életrajzi Lexikon [Great Officers of State in Hungary from King Saint Stephen to Our Days: A Biographical Encyclopedia] (in Hungarian). Helikon Kiadó. ISBN 963-547-085-1.
- Mika, Norbert (2008). Walka o spadek po Babenbergach 1246-1278 (in Polish). Racibórz: Wydawnictwo i Agencja Informacyjna WAW Grzegorz Wawoczny.
