= Wenceslaus I of Bohemia =

King of Bohemia from 1230 to 1253

Wenceslaus I
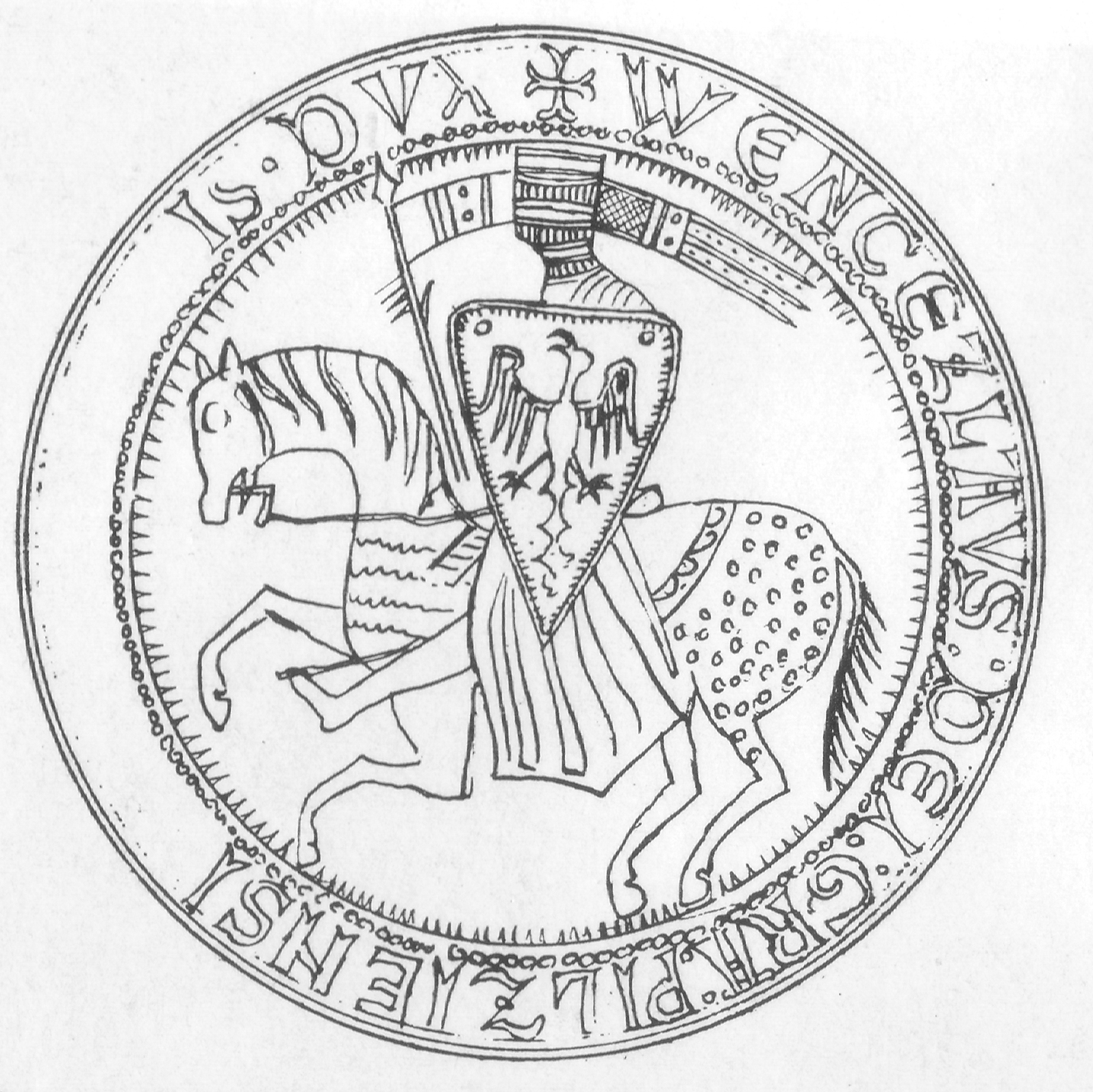
- Seal of Wenceslaus I

King of Bohemia
- Reign: 15 December 1230 – 23 September 1253
- Predecessor: Ottokar I
- Successor: Ottokar II
- Born: c. 1205; Kingdom of Bohemia
- Died: 23 September 1253 (aged c. 48); Králův Dvůr, Kingdom of Bohemia
- Spouse: Kunigunde of Swabia (m. 1224; died 1248)
- Issue more...: Vladislaus, Margrave of Moravia; Ottokar II, King of Bohemia; Beatrice, Margravine of Brandenburg
- Dynasty: Přemyslid
- Father: Ottokar I of Bohemia
- Mother: Constance of Hungary

Wenceslaus I (Czech: Václav I.; c. 1205 – 23 September 1253), called One-Eyed, was King of Bohemia from 1230 to 1253.

Wenceslaus was a son of Ottokar I of Bohemia and his second wife Constance of Hungary.

== Marriage and children ==
In 1224, Wenceslaus married Kunigunde of Hohenstaufen, third daughter of Philip of Swabia, King of Germany, and his wife Irene Angelina. Wenceslaus encouraged large numbers of Germans to settle in the villages and towns in Bohemia and Moravia. Stone buildings began to replace wooden ones in Prague as a result of the influence of the new settlers.

Wenceslaus and Kunigunde had five known children:

- Vladislaus III of Moravia (c. 1228 – 3 January 1247)
- Ottokar II of Bohemia (c. 1230 – 26 August 1278)
- Beatrice (c. 1231 – 27 May 1290), who married Otto III of Brandenburg
- Agnes (died 10 August 1268), who married Henry III of Meissen
- A daughter who died young

== Early reign ==
On 6 February 1228, Wenceslaus was crowned as co-ruler of the Kingdom of Bohemia with his father. On 15 December 1230, Ottokar died and Wenceslaus succeeded him as the senior King of Bohemia.

His early reign was preoccupied by the threat to Bohemia posed by Frederick II, Duke of Austria. The expansionism of Frederick caused the concern and protestation of several other rulers. In 1236, Holy Roman Emperor Frederick II was involved in a war against the Lombard League. The Emperor demanded Wenceslaus and other rulers of the Holy Roman Empire to lend him part of their own troops for his war effort. Wenceslaus led a group of princes who expressed their reluctance to divert any troops from the defense of their own territories, citing fear of invasion from the Duchy of Austria. They requested imperial intervention in the situation.

In June 1236, the Emperor imposed an imperial ban on the Duke of Austria. Troops dispatched against the Duke forced him to flee Vienna for Wiener Neustadt. He would continue to rule a rump state for the following year. The Emperor declared direct imperial rule in both Austria and the Duchy of Styria, also held by the fleeing Duke. Ekbert von Andechs-Meranien, former Bishop of Bamberg was installed as governor in the two Duchies. Ekbert would govern from February to his death on 5 June 1237. Wenceslaus was hardly pleased with this apparent expansion of direct imperial authority close to his borders. Wenceslaus and Duke Frederick formed an alliance against the Emperor. Frederick the Emperor chose to lift the ban in 1237 rather than maintain another open front. Wenceslaus managed to negotiate the expansion of Bohemia north of the Danube, annexing territories offered by Duke Frederick in order of forming and maintaining their alliance.

Wenceslaus and Frederick also found another ally in the person of Otto II, Duke of Bavaria. In June 1239, Wenceslaus and Otto left the Reichstag at Eger, abandoning the service of excommunicated Emperor Frederick II. Despite their intent to elect an anti-king, no such election would take place until 1246. In 1246, Henry Raspe, Landgrave of Thuringia, was elected King of Germany in opposition to Emperor Frederick II and Conrad IV of Germany.

== Mongol invasion ==
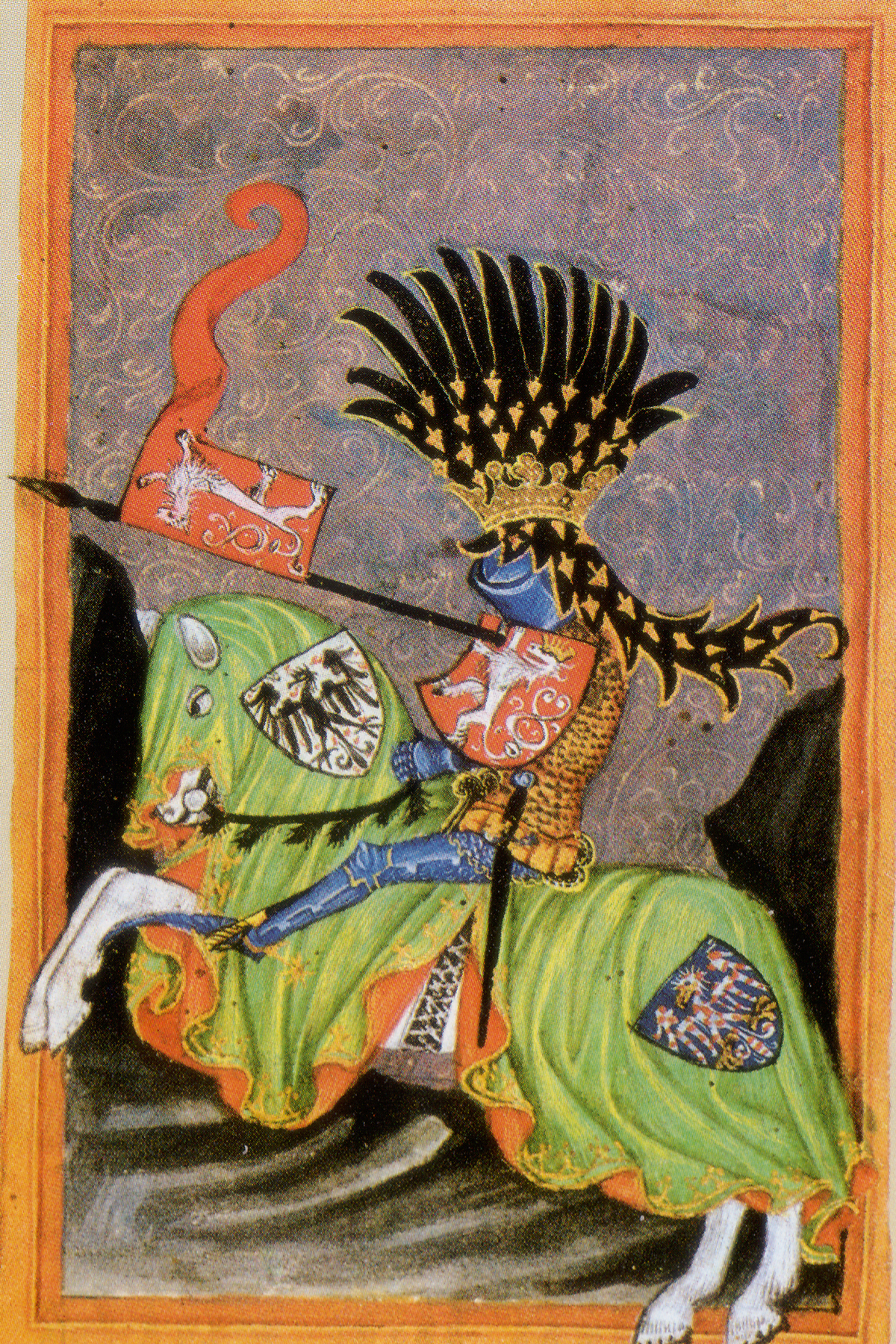
Depiction of Wenceslaus in the Codex Gelnhausen (early 15th century)

In 1241 Wenceslaus successfully repelled a raid on Bohemia by forces serving under Batu Khan and Subutai of the Mongol Empire as part of the Mongol invasion of Europe. The Mongols raided the Kingdom of Poland, Silesia and Moravia, led by Baidar, Kadan and Orda Khan with a force of around 20,000 Mongols, causing much destruction.

During the Mongol invasion of Poland, Duke Henry II the Pious of Silesia, Wenceslaus' brother in law, initially asked his help in fighting off the Mongols. However, as Wenceslaus was coming to his aid in Legnica with a force of 50,000 soldiers, impatience forced Henry II to attack the Mongols without Bohemia's help which resulted in the devastating Battle of Legnica. Following the Mongol victory, Wenceslaus fell back to protect Bohemia. He gathered reinforcements from Thuringia and Saxony along the way, before taking refuge in Bohemia's mountainous countries whose terrain would reduce the mobility of the Mongolian cavalry. After their failure against Wenceslaus' army, the Mongols led by Baidar and Kadan turned away from Bohemia and Poland and went southward to reunite with Batu and Subutai in Hungary, who had won a pyrrhic victory over the Hungarians at the Battle of Mohi.

When Subutai heard in 1242 that Grand Khan Ögedei had died the previous year, the Mongol army retreated eastward, because Subutai had three princes of the blood in his command and Genghis Khan had made clear that all descendants of the Khagan (Grand Khan) should return to the Mongol capital of Karakorum for the kurultai which would elect the next Khagan. Such was Wenceslaus' success against the invaders that chroniclers sent messages to Emperor Frederick II of his "victorious defense".

== Duchy of Austria for Přemyslids ==
On 15 June 1246, Frederick II, Duke of Austria, was killed in the Battle of the Leitha River against Béla IV of Hungary. His death ended reign of the Babenberg dynasty in Austria. The matter of his succession would result in years of disputes among various heirs. Wenceslaus' foreign policy became focused on acquiring Austria for the Přemyslid dynasty. Meanwhile, Emperor Frederick II managed to once again place Austria under direct imperial rule. However imperial governor Otto von Eberstein had to contend with an Austrian rebellion, preventing immediate benefits from the annexation of the Duchy.

The Privilegium Minus, the document which had elevated Austria to a Duchy on 17 September 1156, allowed for the female line of the House of Babenberg to succeed to the throne. Gertrude, Duchess of Austria, niece of the late Frederick II, thus was able to claim the Duchy in her own right. Wenceslaus arranged for her marriage to his eldest son, Vladislaus, Margrave of Moravia. Vladislaus was declared a jure uxoris Duke of Austria and managed to secure the support of part of the Austrian nobility. On 3 January 1247, Vladislaus died suddenly and the initial plan of Wenceslaus was negated. Gertrude continued her claim and proceeded to marry Herman VI, Margrave of Baden.

== The rebellion ==
In 1248, Wenceslaus had to deal with a rebellion of the Bohemian nobility, led by his own son Ottokar II. Ottokar had been enticed by discontented nobles to lead the rebellion, during which he received the nickname "the younger King" (mladší král). Wenceslaus managed to defeat the rebels and imprisoned his son. Ottokar II held the title of King of Bohemia from 31 July 1248 to November 1249.

By the end of 1250, both the Emperor and Herman VI were deceased. The latter having never been accepted by the Austrian nobles, Gertrude and their only son Frederick I, Margrave of Baden continued their claim. Wenceslaus led a successful invasion of Austria, completed by 1251. Wenceslaus released Ottokar II and named him Margrave of Moravia. Wenceslaus had Ottokar proclaimed Duke of Austria and acclaimed by the nobility. In order to secure dynastic rights to Austria, Wenceslaus had another female Babenberg proclaimed Duchess and betrothed to his son. Margaret, Duchess of Austria, was a sister of Duke Frederick II and an aunt of Gertrude. She was also the widow of Henry (VII) of Germany, who had died in 1242. However, Margaret was much older than Ottokar. Their marriage took place on 11 February 1252.

Wenceslaus did not enjoy his victory for long. He died on 23 September 1253 and Ottokar II succeeded him.

== Evaluation of the reign of Wenceslas I ==
Under the reign of Wenceslas I of Bohemia, the royal court came to cultivate lifestyles typical of contemporary Western Europe, including the culture of jousting and tournaments and the enjoyment of courtly poetry and songs. His government is associated with the establishment of Czech statehood, an increase of Czech political influence in Europe, the rise of Czech nobility, and continued development of urban life, trade and crafts.

Wenceslas, like his father and son, supported the arrival of ethnic Germans into the country. He was also the first to allow privileges to the Jews; however, they were expected to pay considerable sums of money for them.

== Cities founded by Wenceslaus ==
- Jihlava, 1233
- Brno, 1238
- Olomouc, c. 1240
- Old Town, Prague, c. 1240
- Stříbro, c. 1240
- Loket, c. 1250
- Žatec, c. 1250
- Cheb, c. 1250
- Přerov, 1252

== Sources ==
- Dvornik, Francis (1962). The Slavs in European History and Civilization. Rutgers University Press.
- Krofta, Kamil (1968). "Bohemia to the Extinction of the Premyslids". In Tanner, J.R.; Previte-Orton, C.W.; Brooke, Z.N. (eds.). The Cambridge Medieval History. Vol. VI. Cambridge University Press.
- Lyon, Jonathan R. (2013). Princely Brothers and Sisters: The Sibling Bond in German Politics, 1100-1250. Cornell University Press.
- Poole, Austin Lane (1968). "Germany in the Reign of Frederick II". The Cambridge Medieval History. Vol. VI. Cambridge University Press.
- Sturner, Wolfgang (1992). Friedrich II:Teil 1 Die Konigscheffschaft in Sizilien un Deutschland 1194-1220 (in German). Wissenschaftliche Buchgesellschaft.
- Wihoda, Martin (2015). Vladislaus Henry: The Formation of Moravian Identity. Translated by Millerova, Katerina. Brill.

Regnal titles
Preceded by Ottokar I	King of Bohemia; 1230–1253	Succeeded by Ottokar II
