= Frederick II of Austria =

Duke of Austria and Styria from 1230 to 1246

Frederick II
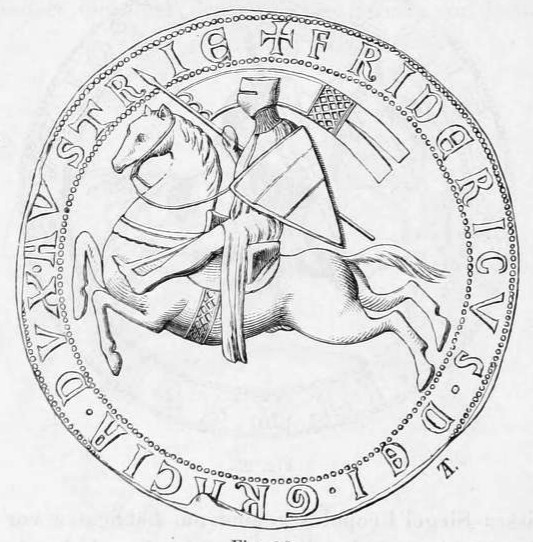
- Seal of Frederick, by God's grace Duke of Austria

Duke of Austria and Styria
- Reign: 1230–1246
- Predecessor: Leopold VI
- Successor: Rudolf of Habsburg
- Born: 25 April 1211; Wiener Neustadt
- Died: 15 June 1246 (aged 35); Battle of the Leitha River
- Burial: Heiligenkreuz Abbey
- Spouse: Sophia Laskarina; Agnes of Merania
- House: House of Babenberg
- Father: Leopold VI
- Mother: Theodora Angelina

Frederick II (German: Friedrich II.; 25 April 1211 – 15 June 1246), known as Frederick the Quarrelsome (Friedrich der Streitbare), was Duke of Austria and Styria from 1230 until his death. He was the fifth and last Austrian duke from the House of Babenberg, since the former margraviate was elevated to a duchy by the 1156 Privilegium Minus. He was killed in the Battle of the Leitha River, leaving no male heirs.

== Family ==
Born in Wiener Neustadt, Frederick was the second surviving son of the Babenberg duke Leopold VI of Austria and Theodora Angelina, a Byzantine princess. The death of his elder brother Henry in 1228 made him the only heir to the Austrian and Styrian duchies.

His first wife was Byzantine princess Eudokia Laskarina, (referred to as Sophia), a daughter of emperor Theodore I Laskaris and his first wife Anna Komnene Angelina. They were divorced by 1222. Frederick secondly married Agnes of Merania in 1229, an heiress of the extinct noble House of Andechs whose dowry included large possessions in Carniola and the Windic March. From 1232 Frederick styled himself Dominus Carniolae ("Lord of Carniola"). However, the marriage was dissolved due to childlessness in 1243.

== Reign ==
Frederick succeeded his father in 1230. Proud of his Byzantine descent, the young duke soon was known as the Quarrelsome because of his harsh rule and frequent wars against his neighbors, primarily with Hungary, Bavaria and Bohemia. Even the Austrian Kuenring ministeriales, which had so far been faithful to the ruling house, started an insurgency as soon as his reign began.

According to the Weltchronik of Jans der Enikel, Frederick had gone to the court of Emperor Frederick II by his summon, leading a procession of 200 knights wearing the triband colors of Austria. When he approached the Emperor, he was enthusiastically invited—by both command and request of Emperor Frederick—to eat bread with him. The Duke refused, stating he brought his own gold. But the Emperor insisted without prevailing. Thus instead he ordered that no one in the town sell the Duke firewood for his kitchen. Duke Frederick instead sought a house to buy and when the Emperor learned of this, forbade it. Duke Frederick then instructed his marshal to go out late at night and buy some nuts so that his food could be prepared. Duke Frederick had impressed the Emperor so much that he allowed him the sale of firewood and whatever he wishes. Afterwards, the Duke asked to be shown the Emperor's assassins, which he was allowed. They moved onto the town's tower, which stood 50 cubics tall, and brought out two of his assassins. The Emperor then told one to jump down and without a thought, the man leapt and fell to his death. Immediately, Duke Frederick was impressed by the sheer loyalty of these men and the Emperor stopped the other man from jumping. The experience convinced the Duke of the Emperor's power.

Most dangerous were his disputes with the Hohenstaufen Emperor Frederick II in the course of the rebellion of the emperor's son Henry (VII), husband of Frederick's sister Margaret. Not only had the duke refused to appear at the 1232 Reichstag diet in Aquileia, appealing to the Austrian Privilegium Minus privileges, and displeased the emperor by picking quarrels with King Béla IV of Hungary, he furthermore seemed to be involved in his brother-in-law Henry's conspiracy. When he again refused to attend the 1235 diet in Mainz, Emperor Frederick II finally ostracized him and gave permission to King Wenceslaus I of Bohemia to invade the Austrian lands. Vienna opened its gates for the united Bohemian and Bavarian forces and during the years of Frederick's ban even became an imperial free city, where the emperor had his son Conrad IV elected King of the Romans in 1237. However, the expelled duke managed to maintain his position as the ruler of an Austrian rump state at his Wiener Neustadt residence. In the same year, Frederick enacted the Landrecht Law, which required all subjects to defend the country in the case of invasion.

In 1239, in a spectacular change in imperial politics, Duke Frederick became one of the emperor's most important allies. In 1241, Duke Frederick was one of the very few Western European commanders who faced the Mongols when they invaded Austria. After the Mongols started pillaging Hungary and Croatia, King Bela IV asked the papacy and the Western European rulers for help. Duke Frederick sent a very small expeditionary force of knights to assist the Hungarians. He and his knights managed to defeat a small Mongolian raiding party during the initial stages of the Battle of Mohi, but they soon left after inter-conflicts with King Bela IV and the Cumans in the region. He would meet the Mongols again, this time in his own country. After the defeat of Hungary, the Mongols now set their sights on Vienna. A minor raiding squadron started pillaging Korneuburg near Vienna on the eastern bank of the Danube, or maybe Wiener Neustadt west of the Danube and 50 km southwest of Vienna, but Duke Frederick together with his knights and foreign allies, defeated them and drove them out. The Austrians would again defeat the Mongols in the River Morava in Theben. Afterwards, the Mongols never again tried to invade Austria.

The conflict with Bohemia was settled by the engagement of his niece Gertrude of Babenberg with King Wenceslaus' eldest son Margrave Vladislaus of Moravia. Negotiations with the emperor about the elevation of Vienna to a bishopric and of Austria (including Styria) to a kingdom were initiated, however, on condition that the duke's niece Gertrude now would have to marry the fifty-year-old emperor, who moreover had recently been banned by Pope Gregory IX and needed allies. In 1245 the terms were arranged, but the willful young girl, then in her late teens, refused to appear in the consummation ceremony at the diet of Verona. In the year before his death, Duke Frederick finally succeeded in gaining the rule over the March of Carniola from the Patriarchate of Aquileia, but upon his death it fell to the Carinthian duke Bernhard von Spanheim.

Duke Frederick's ambitious plans were dashed when he died at the Battle of the Leitha River, in another border conflict he had picked with the Hungarian king Béla IV. He is buried at Heiligenkreuz Abbey. Since Duke Frederick was the last of the male Babenberg descendants, Emperor Frederick claimed Austria and Styria as imperial fiefs, and added them to the Staufen dynastic domain allodial possessions for his namesake grandson, the only surviving child of Henry (VII) and Margaret. The emperor sent imperial officials to govern Austria and Styria and even acquired the sizable Babenberg fortune. With Emperor Frederick’s death in 1250 however, and the subsequent decline of the Staufen, none of his family were able to press their claim and Austria and Styria were caught between several claimants over the next decades.

== Legacy ==
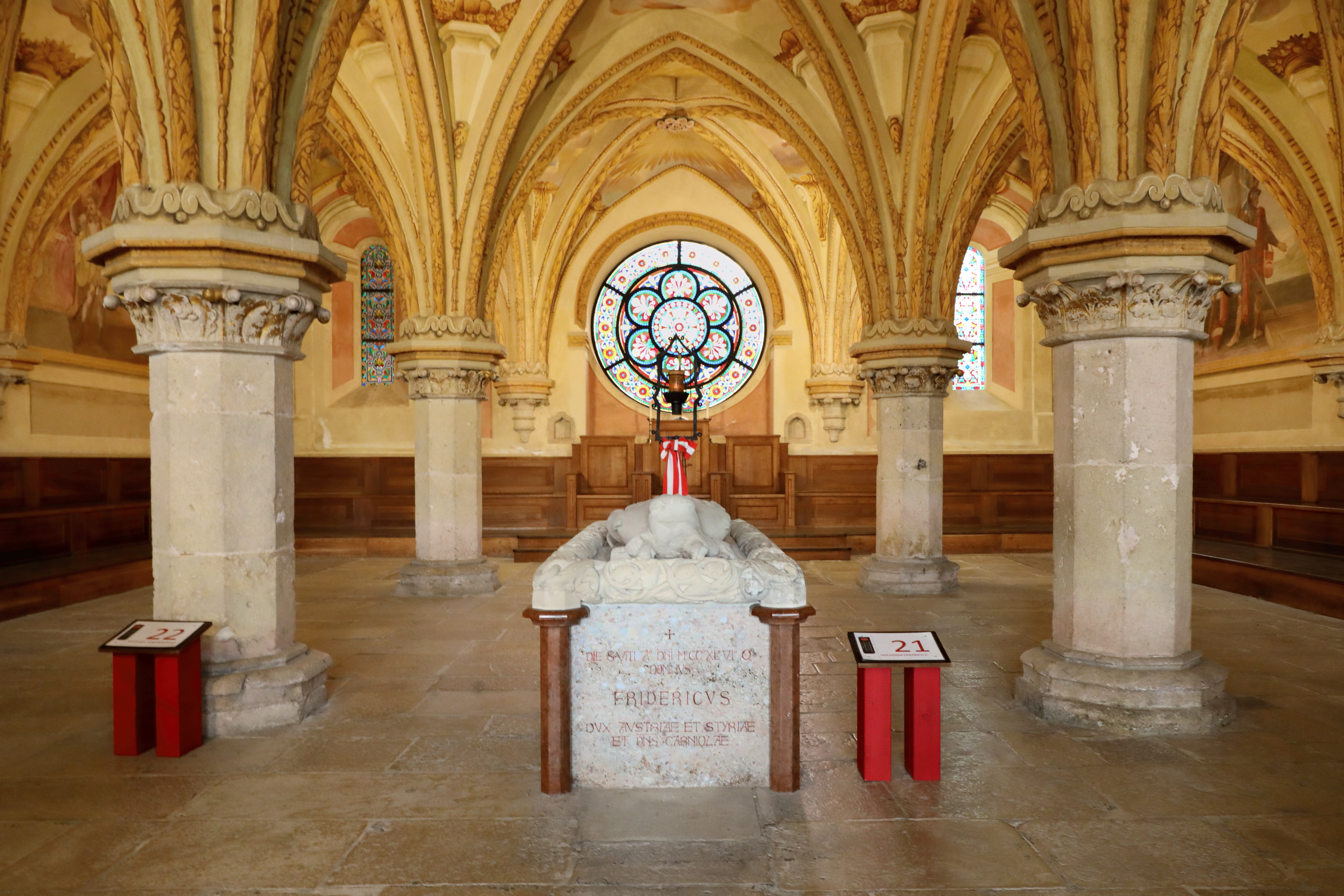
Frederick's tomb in the Heiligenkreuz chapter hall

As the Austrian Privilegium Minus of 1156 allowed women to inherit, Frederick's sister Margaret and his niece Gertrude would have been entitled to the throne. Shortly after the death of her uncle, Gertrude first married her fiancé Vladislaus of Moravia, who nevertheless died in the next year, then Margrave Herman VI of Baden, who did not manage to maintain his position in Austria, and finally in 1252 Prince Roman Danylovich, a younger brother of Knyaz Lev I Rurik, son-in-law of the Hungarian king, who also ended in divorce in 1253.

In the same year the Bohemian Přemyslids made a second attempt to confirm their claims to the Austrian and Styrian duchies by arranging the marriage between Gertrude's aunt Margaret of Babenberg and King Wenceslaus' son Ottokar II, more than twenty years her junior. Subsequently, Austria became a field of conflict between the Přemyslids and the Hungarian Árpád dynasty, in which Ottokar at first would prevail defeating King Béla at the 1260 Battle of Kressenbrunn, until finally being overthrown by the Habsburg king Rudolf I of Germany at the Battle on the Marchfeld in 1278.

As the last Babenberg duke, Frederick the Quarrelsome signifies the end of an era in the history of Austria, beginning with the enfeoffment of Margrave Leopold I in 976. With his overambitious plans, which were frequently foiled by his erratic character, he somewhat resembled his later Habsburg successor Duke Rudolf IV. According to the 18th-century historian Chrysostomus Hanthaler, Frederick was the first Austrian duke utilizing the red-white-red coat of arms after his accession—an attempt to prevail against the reluctant local nobles and to stress his autonomy towards Emperor Frederick II. The triband is first documented in a seal on a deed issued on 30 November 1230, confirming the privileges of Lilienfeld Abbey. The medieval chronicler Jans der Enikel reports that the duke appeared in a red-white-red ceremonial dress at his 1232 accolade in the Vienna Schottenstift.

== Sources ==
- Angold, Michael (2011). "The Latin Empire of Constantinople, 1204–1261: Marriage Strategies". Identities and Allegiances in the Eastern Mediterranean after 1204. Farnham: Ashgate Publishing Limited. pp. 47–68. ISBN 978-1409410980.
- Beller, Steven (2007). A Concise History of Austria. New York: Cambridge University Press. ISBN 978-0521478861.
- Fastlinger, Maximilianus, ed. (1920). Passau Necrologies, Volume 2. Berlin: Böhlau.
- Graeme Dunphy, R. (2003). History as Literature: German World Chronicles of the Thirteenth Century in Verse. Michigan: Western Michigan Univ. ISBN 978-1580440424.
- Gravett, Christopher (1997). German Medieval Armies 1000–1300. Oxford: Osprey Publishing. ISBN 978-1855326576.
- Lechner, Karl (1976). Die Babenberger: Markgrafen und Herzoge von Österreich 976–1246. Vienna: Böhlau. ISBN 978-3205085089.
- Leeper, Alexander W. (1941). History of Medieval Austria. London: Oxford University Press. ISBN 978-0404153472.
- Lingelbach, William E. (1913). The History of Nations: Austria-Hungary. New York: P. F. Collier & Son Company. ASIN B000L3E368.
- Loud, Graham A.; Schenk, Jochen, eds. (2017). The Origins of the German Principalities, 1100–1350: Essays by German Historians. Routledge.
- Lyon, Jonathan R. (2013). Princely Brothers and Sisters: The Sibling Bond in German Politics, 1100–1250. Cornell University Press.186
- Pohl, Walter (1995). Die Welt der Babenberger. Graz: Verlag Styria. ISBN 978-3222123344.
- Previté-Orton, C. W. (1937). A History of Europe: From 1198 to 1378. London: Methuen & Company Ltd. ISBN 978-0416435207.
- Rickett, Richard (1985). A Brief Survey of Austrian History. Vienna: Prachner. ISBN 978-3853670019.
- Vaníček, Vratislav (2000). Velké dějiny zemí Koruny české II. 1197–1250. Praha: Paseka. p. 341. ISBN 8071852732.
- Verber, Václav (2002). Dějiny Rakouska. Praha: Nakladatelství Lidové noviny. p. 107. ISBN 8071064912.

Frederick II of Austria House of Babenberg Born: 1211 Died: 1246
Regnal titles
Preceded by Leopold VI	Duke of Austria and Styria; 1230–1246	Vacant Interregnum Title next held by Rudolf of Habsburg
