= Ulrich IV of Pfannberg =

Ulrich IV, Count of Pfannberg
- Born: c. 1260
- Died: before 1318
- Buried: Rein Abbey
- Noble family: House of Pfannberg
- Spouse: Margaret of Heunburg
- Issue: Ulrich V, Count of Pfannberg
- Father: Henry, Count of Pfannberg
- Mother: Agnes of Plain

Ulrich IV of Pfannberg (c. 1260 – before 1318) was Count of Pfannberg from 1287 until his death.

== Life ==
Ulrich was a son of Count Henry of Pfannberg and his wife Agnes of Plain. He was first mentioned by name in 1278, together with his older brother Herman, in a document archived at St. Paul's Abbey in the Lavanttal.

After Herman died in 1287, Ulrich inherited his possessions, except Traberg (Unterdrauburg and Dravograd), which remained in the hands of Herman's widow Elisabeth, née Countess of Heunburg, because Ulrich was in a tight financial situation and could not afford to pay her a pension.

Ulrich married in 1287 or early 1288, to Margaret of Heunburg. On the Sunday before Ascension Day he confirmed at Bleiburg that his father-in-law, Count Ulrich II of Heunburg, had paid Margaret's dowry of 1000 silver marks and that he and Margaret would renounce any claims on the inheritance of his in-laws. A consequence of this marriage was that when the Heunburg family died out in the male line in 1322, a significant portion of their possessions were inherited by the House of Pfannberg.

Ulrich's grandfather had been an energetic man, who had achieved the rank of Count for his family, and his father Henry had been a famous knight with leadership qualities. By contrast, the chroniclers hardly mention Ulrich IV. Ottokar aus der Gaal mentions in his Styrian rhyming chronicle that Ulrich IV participated in the rebellion against Duke Albert of Austria in late 1291 and early 1292 and had been a member of the delegation sent to Archbishop Conrad of Salzburg to persuade him to join the rebellion. He does not appear to have distinguished himself by his bravery and, unlike his ancestors, who had often been at war with the clergy, Ulrich IV was very generous towards the church and the monasteries, which obviously worsened his financial difficulties and drove him to mortgage almost all of his possessions.

Ulrich IV probably accompanied Duke Albert on his ill-fated campaign in Hungary in 1291. Later that year a rebellion broke out in Styria, because Duke Albert refused to confirm the privileges of the Estates. His father-in-law was probably the driving force behind this refusal, since Albert himself did not play a major rôle in this conflict. The rebellion collapsed in March 1292, after Albert captured Bruck an der Mur and took the rebel leader Frederick of Stubenberg prisoner. Ulrich IV did not participate in the rebellion against Duke Meinhard II of Carinthia in late 1292 and early 1293.

In 1292, donations by the Counts of Pfannberg to Rein Abbey were recorded.

On 30 May 1292 at Greiffen, his father-in-law, Count Ulrich II of Heunberg, sold a manor named Rain in Rakkonik (this was most likely the manor now known as Rainhof in Raggane, north-east of Sankt Paul im Lavanttal) to abbot Conrad of the St. Paul's Abbey and promised he would plead with Ulrich IV to allow this sale, as Ulrich IV was still liege lord of this and many other possessions east of the river Lavant, for example Puhelarn manor in Unterpichling (which was later acquired by St. Paul's Abbey) and Dachberg, Mühldorf, Lindhof, Götzendorf and Hundsdorf, as well as the castles at Rabenstein, Loschental and Lavamünd.

Ulrich's brother Rainold, the abbot of Rein Abbey, died on 21 December 1292. His death made life difficult for Ulrich. Life became even more difficult when in 1293 Duke Albert took his parents-in-law prisoner and banished them to Wiener Neustadt. Ulrich spent a lot of money trying to release them, and was continuously strapped for cash.

On 5 July 1294 at Judenburg castle, Ulrich IV and his wife Margaret pledged their princely fief, the castle at Sankt Peter-Freienstein, two large manors in Tolling and Welen, and justice over the area from Hohenward and Chieneinöde to the river Kalten Rinne at Röthelstein to Abbot Henry of Admont.

Ulrich IV died before 1318 and was buried at Rein Abbey.

== Marriage and issue ==
Ulrich IV was married to Margaret, the daughter of Count Ulrich II of Heunburg and Countess Agnes of Baden-Austria and they had the following children:

- Ulrich V (1287-1354)
- Elizabeth (1290-1363), married before 1332 to Henry of Montpreis (died before 1363)
