= Kunigunde of Hohenstaufen =

Queen of Bohemia from 1230 to 1248

Queen consort of Bohemia
- Tenure: 1230–1248
- Coronation: 6 February 1228
- Born: February or March 1202; Swabia, Germany
- Died: 13 September 1248 (aged 47–48); Prague, Bohemia
- Burial: Convent of St Agnes of Bohemia in Prague
- Spouse: Wenceslaus I of Bohemia (m. 1224)
- Issue: Vladislaus, Margrave of Moravia; Ottokar II of Bohemia
- House: Hohenstaufen
- Father: Philip of Swabia
- Mother: Irene Angelina

Kunigunde of Hohenstaufen or Kunigunde of Swabia (German: Kunigunde von Staufen or Kunigunde von Schwaben, Czech: Kunhuta Štaufská or Kunhuta Švábská) (February/March 1202 – 13 September 1248) was the third daughter of Philip, Duke of Swabia and his wife, Irene Angelina.

== Family ==
She and her three sisters were orphaned in 1208; that year, her father was murdered by Count Otto VIII of Wittelsbach, and a few months later her mother died following the birth of a fifth daughter, who did not live either.

== Marriage and children ==
Kunigunde soon moved to Prague, where her fiancé Wenceslaus lived. He was the eldest surviving son of Ottokar I of Bohemia and his second wife Constance of Hungary. In 1224, Kunigunde married Wenceslaus. They were crowned in 1228.

In 1230, Wenceslaus succeeded his father as King of Bohemia, with Kunigunde as his queen consort. However, Queen Kunigunde seems to be not important in politics, although she founded many monasteries. They had issue:

- Vladislaus III of Moravia (c. 1228 – 3 January 1247).
- Ottokar II of Bohemia (c. 1230 – 26 August 1278).
- Beatrice of Bohemia (c. 1231 – 27 May 1290), married Otto III, Margrave of Brandenburg.
- Agnes of Bohemia (died 10 August 1268), married Henry III, Margrave of Meissen.
- An unnamed daughter, who died young.

When Wenceslaus' childless brother Přemysl, Margrave of Moravia died in 1239, the sons of Wenceslaus and Kunigunde represented the only chance for the survival of the House of Přemysl. The first-born son Vladislaus died in 1247. His mother probably mourned for him less than his father, who was heartbroken.

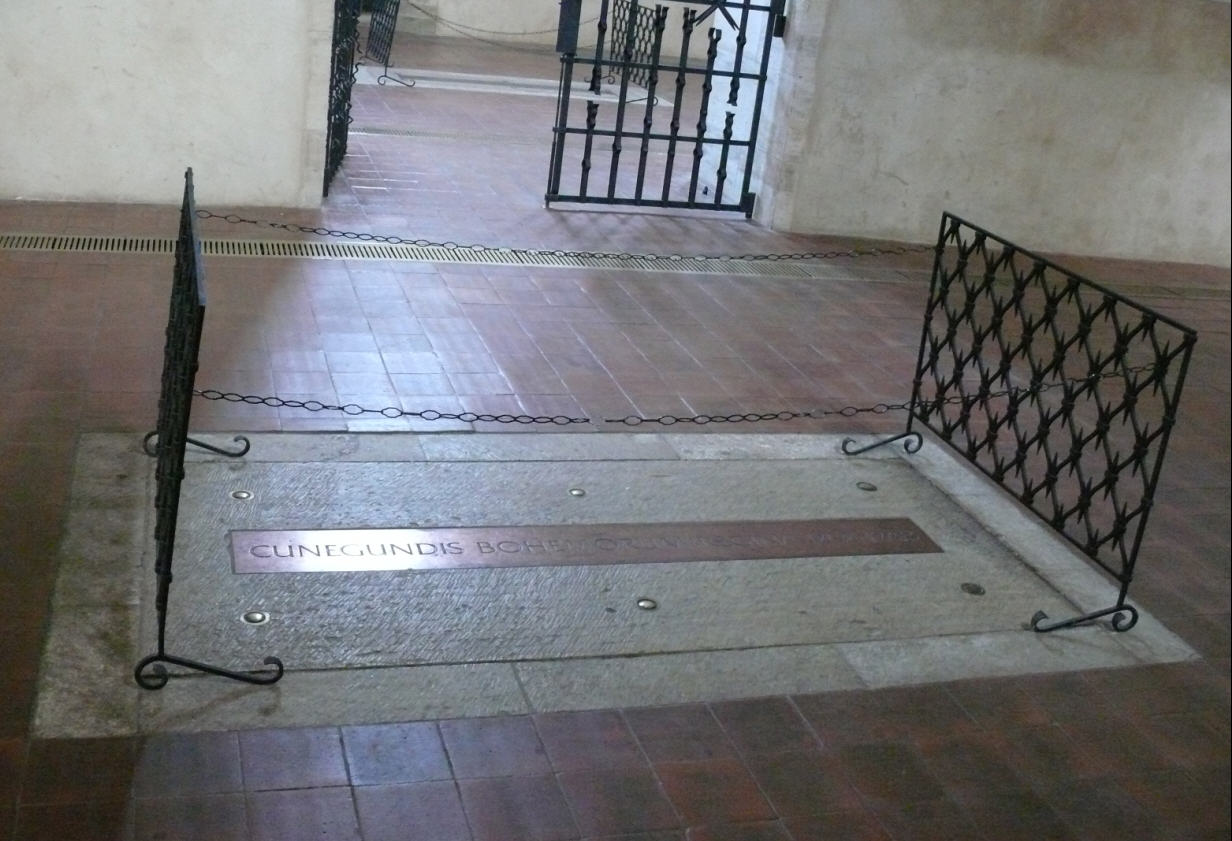
Kunigunde's tomb at the Convent of St Agnes of Bohemia

In 1248, the younger son Přemysl was enticed by discontented nobles to lead a rebellion against his father. Queen Kunigunde stayed in Prague, but died during this revolt on 13 September 1248. Neither husband nor son attended her funeral. She was buried in the St Agnes Convent.

The rebellion was defeated and Ottokar was imprisoned by his father, but released shortly afterwards.

== Sources ==
- Sturner, Wolfgang (1992). Friedrich II:Teil 1 Die Konigscheffschaft in Sizilien un Deutschland 1194-1220 (in German). Wissenschaftliche Buchgesellschaft.
- Wihoda, Martin (2015). Vladislaus Henry: The Formation of Moravian Identity. BRILL. ISBN 978-9004303836.
- Druhé pokračování Kosmovy kroniky. Praha: Svoboda. 1974. OCLC 3097148.

Kunigunde of Hohenstaufen House of Hohenstaufen Born: 1200? Died: 13 September 1248
Royal titles
| Preceded by Constance of Hungary | Queen consort of Bohemia; 1230–1248 | Vacant Title next held by Margaret of Austria |
