= Chrysostomus Hanthaler =

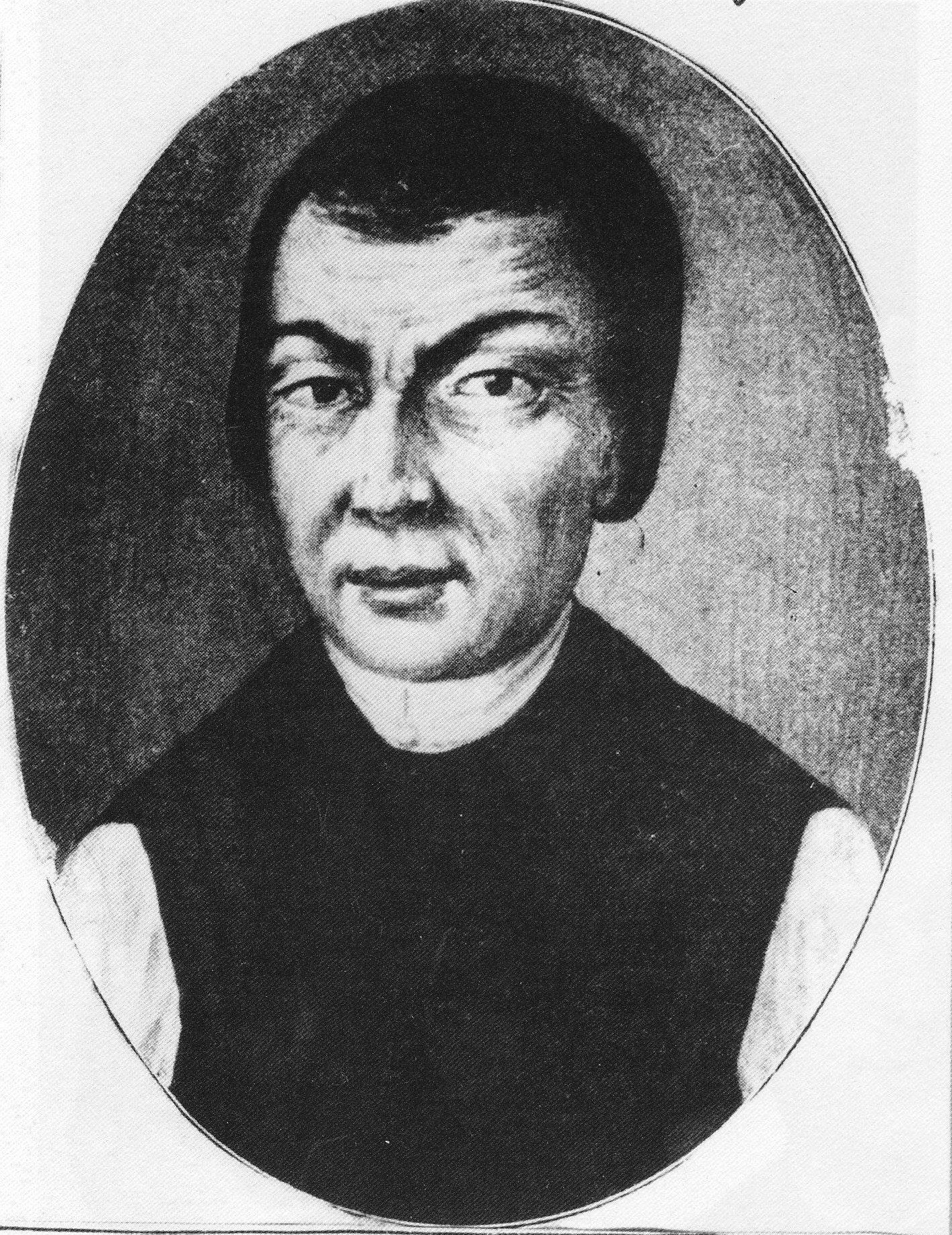

Chrysostomus Hanthaler (b. Ried, Upper Austria, 14 February 1690; d. in the Cistercian monastery of Lilienfeld in Lower Austria, 2 September 1754) was a Cistercian historian and numismatist.

== Biography ==
Having finished his theological studies in Salzburg, he made his profession in 1716 and subsequently devoted himself to historical research.

He was part of the renewal in monastic scholarship initiated by the French Maurists. Closer to home, it was Bernard Pez in Melk and Gottfried Bessel in Göttweig who inspired Hanthaler. The archives and rich library in Lilienfeld offered a useful field for his activity.

== Works ==
On becoming librarian, Hanthaler made it his first task to compile a reliable catalogue and then collected all documents bearing on the history of Lilienfeld and of Austria. Copies and impressions of memorial tablets, seals, and coins were reproduced until his transcripts and compilations filled twenty-two folio volumes. From this matter he composed the Fasti Campililienses in two large volumes (Linz, 1747–1754): this monumental work was a history of Lilienfeld from the thirteenth century to the end of the Middle Ages, a history of the Babenberg dynasty, and also of the Steyer region. His death delayed the completion of his great compilation project. On the suppression of the monastery in 1789, the manuscript was brought to the Imperial Library at Vienna, but the copper plates and prints were sold. Subsequently both came into the hands of Abbot Ladislaus Pyrker, who published the last two volumes under the title of Fastorum Campiliensium Chrysostomi Hanthaler continuatio seu Recensus genealogico-diplomaticus archivi Campiliensis (Vienna, 1819–20), together with two appendices containing descriptions of the tombstones and extracts from the necrology of the monastery.

Hanthaler left behind numerous other writings. These included:

- Grata pro gratiis memoria eorum, quorum pietate Vallis de campo liliorum et surrexit et crevit (Linz, 1744)
- a memorandum book
- Exercitationes faciles de numis veterum (Nuremberg and Vienna, 1753), an introductory manual on numismatics for amateur collectors

Four chronicles of the Babenbergs, which Hanthaler listed in his Fasti in ancient sources, were in fact his own work. These were:

- Ortilonis de Lilienfeld Liber de exordio Campililii
- Notulae anecdotae e chronica stirpis Babenbergicae, quam Aloldus de Peklarn capellanus conscripsit, excerptae
- Chronicon Ricardi canonici Newnburgensis
- Chronicon Fridrici bellicosi of the Dominican Pernold
