= Vladislaus III of Moravia =

Vladislaus III, also called Vladislaus Henry III (c. 1227 – 3 January 1247), was the margrave of Moravia and duke of Austria from 1246 until 1247.

Vladislaus was born around 1227. A member of the Přemyslid dynasty, he was the eldest son and heir of Wenceslaus I, King of Bohemia, and his wife Kunigunde, daughter of Philip of Swabia, King of Germany. His younger brother was the latter King Ottokar II. He was named after his uncle and great uncle, who were also margraves of Moravia. When his other uncle, Přemysl, died in 1239, Wenceslaus took control of Moravia. In 1246, he appointed Vladislaus margrave. Pope Innocent IV wrote a letter to Vladislaus on 24 November 1246 concerning the activity of the papal collector Gotfryd.

As Duke Frederick II of Austria was without a male heir, Wenceslaus sought to acquire the Duchy of Austria by arranging the marriage of Vladislaus with the late duke's niece Gertrude, daughter of Duke Henry II of Mödling, second son of Duke Leopold VI of Austria. Frederick was forced to consent to this arrangement under duress. In 1246, however, Frederick reneged, alleging that the couple was related within the prohibited degree. Wenceslaus obtained a dispensation from the pope. The wedding took place after Frederick's death later that year. He was recognized as duke and is so titled in contemporary Austrian sources. He received the homage of the Austrian nobility, but died suddenly on 3 January 1247, before he could take possession of the duchy. His death was most likely natural. He had no children in his short marriage. According to the Anonymous Austrian Chronicle:

M^{o}.cc.xlvj^{o}. Rex Bohemie misit filium suum in Austriam. Hic dux Gerdrudim filiam ducis Heinrici de Medlico in uxorem [habuit].
M^{o}.cc.xlvij. Filius regis Bohemie dux Austrie obiit.

[1246] The king of Bohemia sent his son into Austria. This duke took to wife Gertrude, daughter of Duke Henry of Mödling.
[1247] The duke of Austria, the son of the king of Bohemia, died.

The Annals of Prague give substantially the same account:

Fridricus, dux Austriae, ab Ungaris in bello occisus est, et filia fratris sui senioris Henrici, quondam ducis Austriae, cum Wladislao, filio regis Bohemiae, matrimonium contraxit, et per hoc Wladislaus habebat Austriae ducatum.
Wladislaus obiit, filius regis Wenceslai, qui Fridrico successerat in Austriae ducatu.

[1246] Frederick, duke of Austria, was killed by the Hungarians in the war, and the daughter of his elder brother Henry, formerly duke of Austria, contracted marriage with Vladislaus, the son of the king of Bohemia, and by this Wladislaus held the duchy of Austria.
[1247] Vladislaus, the son of King Wenceslaus, who succeeded Frederick in the Austrian duchy, died.

Vladislaus was succeeded in Moravia by his younger brother, who soon rebelled against their father. After his death, she married Prince Roman Danylovych. As a result, central Europe was plunged into the War of the Babenberg Succession.
