= Babichev =

Babichev (Russian: Бабичев) is a Russian masculine surname, its feminine counterpart is Babicheva. It may refer to

- Maxim Babichev (born 1986), Belarusian handball player
- Mikhail Babichev (born 1995), Belarusian professional footballer
- Roman Babichev (born 1975), Russian football player
