= Burg Mannsberg =

Castle in Austria

Coordinates: 46°47′51″N 14°29′32″E

- Carinthia, Austria
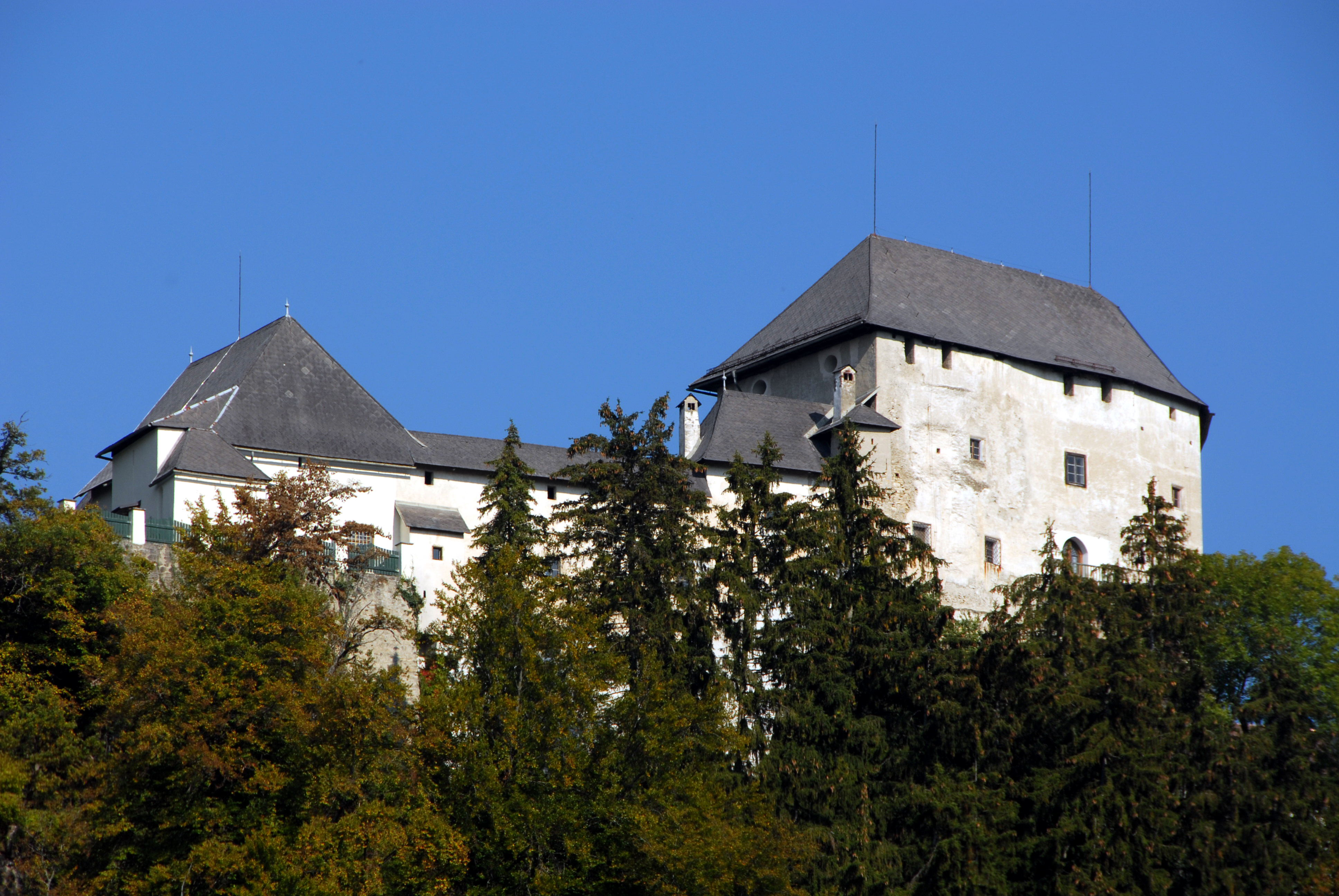
- Mannsberg Castle

Site information
- Type: Castle

Burg Mannsberg is a castle in Carinthia, Austria.

== See also ==
- List of castles in Austria
