= Roman Danylovich =

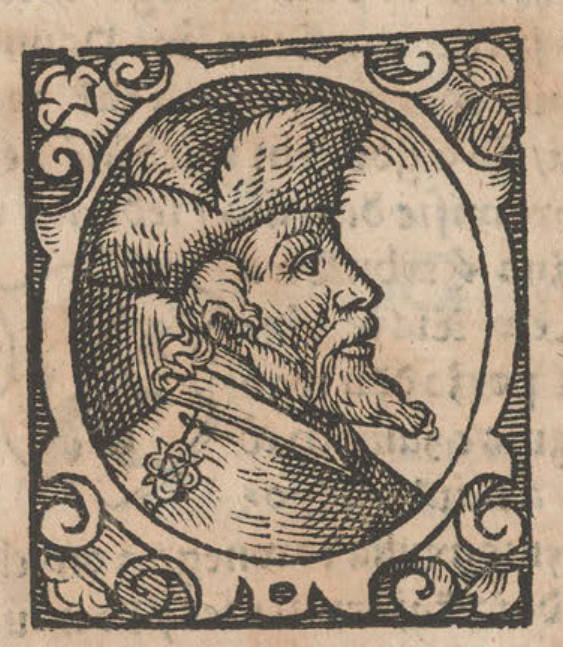
- Born: c. 1230
- Died: c. 1261
- Occupation: monarch
- Spouse: Gertrude of Austria
- Children: Maria Romanovna of Halicz
- Parents: Daniel of Galicia (father); Anna Mstislavna of Novgorod (mother)

Roman Danylovich (Old Ruthenian: Романъ; died after 1258) was the Prince of Black Ruthenia (Novogrudok) 1254–1258, Prince of Slonim.

He was born as a younger son of Daniel of Galicia, a powerful prince of lands east from Poland and later king of those regions, which was usually called Volhynia or Ruthenia (roughly, near modern Belarus and Ukraine). His mother was Anna Mstislavna of Novgorod, daughter of Mstislav the Bold (died before 1252).

In 1252, he was married to Gertrude, Duchess of Austria as her third husband. During that time he resided in the castle of Himberg and participated in her attempts to get the power in her duchy, under rivaling claimants. However, already next year they ended up in divorce and Roman returned to Rus' where Lithuanian duke Mindaugas awarded him with control over the region of Black Ruthenia, including the cities of Novogrudok, Slonim and Vovkovysk. In 1258 Mongol leader Boroldai forced Roman along with his uncle Vasylko Romanovych of Volhynia and other princes of modern-day Ukraine to join a campaign against Lithuania, during which the prince fell in battle.

== Marriage and issue ==
Roman was married twice:

1. Gertrude, Duchess of Austria (born c. 1223 - died c. 1288 or died 24 April 1299), married 27 June 1252 (divorced 1253)
2. Elena Glebovna of Volkovysk (born after 1288), married c. 1255

He had the following issue:

- Vasilko Romanovich (born c. 1256, died after 1282) [2m.], Prince of Slonim; he may (or may not) have been grandfather of Prince Daniel Ostrogski
- Mikhail Romanovich [parentage uncertain], Prince of Drutsk; his alleged descendants include Princes Drutski, Drutskoy-Sokolinski, Konoplya-Sokolinski, Drutski-Ozeretski, Drutski-Prikhabski, Babichev, Drutski-Lubetski, Drutski-Gorski, and Putyatin.
- Maria Romanovna [1m.], married Joachim, son of Baron Stefan of Zagreb
- Maria, married Prince of Turov Yaroslav Yuriyovych
