= Ottokar II of Bohemia =

King of Bohemia from 1253 to 1278

Ottokar II
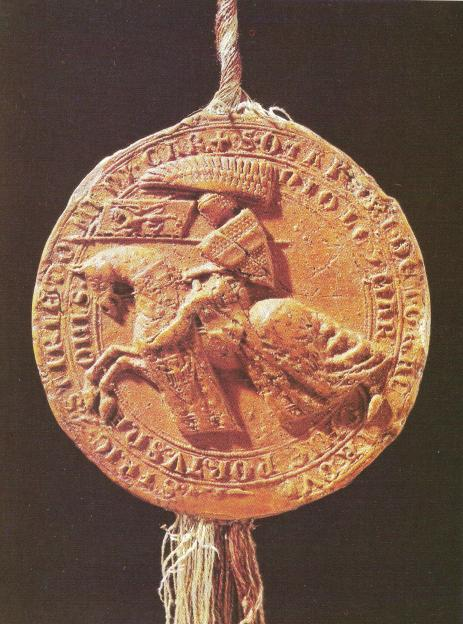
- Ottokar's royal seal

King of Bohemia
- Reign: 23 December 1253 – 26 August 1278
- Coronation: 1261, Prague
- Predecessor: Wenceslaus I
- Successor: Wenceslaus II
- Born: c. 1233; Městec Králové, Bohemia
- Died: 26 August 1278 (aged c. 44–45); Dürnkrut, Austria
- Burial: Saint Vitus Cathedral
- Spouses: Margaret of Austria (m. 1252; ann. 1260) Kunigunda of Slavonia (m. 1261)
- Issue more...: Kunigunde of Bohemia; Wenceslaus II of Bohemia; Nicholas I of Troppau (illeg.)
- Dynasty: Přemyslid
- Father: Wenceslaus I of Bohemia
- Mother: Kunigunde of Hohenstaufen

Ottokar II (Czech: Přemysl Otakar II.; c. 1233, in Městec Králové, Bohemia – 26 August 1278, in Dürnkrut, Lower Austria), the Iron and Golden King, was a member of the Přemyslid dynasty who reigned as King of Bohemia from 1253 until his death in 1278. He also held the titles of Margrave of Moravia from 1247, Duke of Austria from 1251, and Duke of Styria from 1260, as well as Duke of Carinthia and landgrave of Carniola from 1269.

With Ottokar's rule, the Přemyslids reached the peak of their power in the Holy Roman Empire. His expectations of the imperial crown, however, were never fulfilled.

Ottokar was the second son of King Wenceslaus I of Bohemia (reigned 1230–1253). Through his mother, Kunigunde, daughter of Philip of Swabia, he was related to the Holy Roman Emperors of the Hohenstaufen dynasty, which became extinct in the male line upon the execution of King Conradin of Sicily in 1268.

Named after his grandfather King Přemysl Ottokar I, he was originally educated for the role of an ecclesiastical administrator, while his elder brother Vladislaus was designated heir of the Bohemian kingdom. He was possibly educated by the Bohemian chancellor Philip of Spanheim, who would later become a rival for the rule of the Duchy of Carinthia.

== Rise to power ==
When his brother Vladislaus died in 1247, Ottokar suddenly became the heir to the Bohemian throne. According to popular oral tradition, he was profoundly shocked by his brother's death and did not involve himself in politics, becoming focused on hunting and drinking. His father appointed the new heir as Margrave of Moravia, and Ottokar took up residence in Brno, where he was occupied with the reconstruction of the Moravian lands devastated by Mongol raids of 1242.

In 1248, some discontented nobles who supported Emperor Frederick II enticed Ottokar into leading a rebellion against his father King Wenceslaus. During this rebellion he was elected "the younger King" (mladší král) on 31 July 1248 and temporarily expelled his father from Prague Castle. Přemysl Ottokar II held the title of King of Bohemia until November 1249. However, Pope Innocent IV excommunicated Ottokar, whereafter Wenceslaus finally managed to defeat the rebels and imprisoned his son at Přimda Castle.

Father and son eventually reconciled to assist the king's aim of acquiring the neighbouring Duchy of Austria. The last Babenberg duke, Frederick II, had been killed in 1246 at the Battle of the Leitha River, sparking the War of the Babenberg Succession. King Wenceslaus had initially attempted to acquire Austria by marrying his heir, Vladislaus, to the last duke's niece Gertrude of Babenberg. That marriage came to an end after half a year with Vladislaus's death in January 1247, and in 1248 Gertrude married the Zähringen margrave Herman VI of Baden. At the death of the last of the Babenberg male line in 1246, Emperor Frederick II seized the duchy as an imperial fief and with it, the sizable Babenberg treasure, installing imperial officials in the Austrian lands and naming his grandson Henry as Duke of Austria and Styria. The Emperor died in late 1250, however, and his grandson was unable to fully establish himself in Austria without his grandfather’s support.

Wenceslaus released Přemysl Ottokar very soon and in 1251 again made him Margrave of Moravia and installed him, with the approval of the Austrian nobles, as governor of Austria. The same year Ottokar entered Austria, where the estates acclaimed him as Duke. To legitimize his position, Přemysl Ottokar married the late Duke Frederick II's sister Margaret of Babenberg, who was his senior by 30 years and the widow of the Hohenstaufen king Henry (VII) of Germany. Their marriage took place on 11 February 1252 at Hainburg.

In 1253, King Wenceslaus died and Přemysl Ottokar succeeded his father as King of Bohemia. After the death of the German King Konrad IV in 1254 while his son Conradin was still a minor, Ottokar also hoped to obtain the Imperial dignity – as King of the Romans – for himself. However, his election bid was unsuccessful and Count William II of Holland, the German anti-king since 1247, was generally recognised.

== Building an empire ==
At the peak of his power, Ottokar II's realm stretched from the Sudetes to the Adriatic Sea.

Feeling threatened by Ottokar's growing regional power beyond the Leitha River, his cousin King Béla IV of Hungary challenged the young king. Béla formed a loose alliance with the Wittelsbach duke Otto II of Bavaria and tried to install his own son Stephen as Duke of Styria, which since 1192 had been ruled in personal union with Austria under the terms of the Georgenberg Pact of 1186. Papal mediation settled the conflict : the parties agreed that Ottokar would yield large parts of Styria to Béla in exchange for recognition of his right to the remainder of Austria.

Subsequently, King Ottokar II led the two crusade expeditions against the pagan Old Prussians (1254–1255 and 1268). Königsberg (now Kaliningrad, Russia), founded in 1255 by the Teutonic Order, was named in his honour and later became the capital of the Duchy of Prussia.

After a few years of peace the conflict with Hungary resumed: Ottokar defeated the Hungarians in July 1260 at the Battle of Kressenbrunn, ending years of disputes over Styria with Béla IV. Béla now ceded Styria back to Ottokar, and his claim to those territories was formally recognized by Richard of Cornwall, then king of Germany and nominal ruler of all the German lands. This peace agreement was also sealed by a royal marriage. Ottokar ended his marriage to Margaret and married Béla's young granddaughter Kunigunda of Halych, who became the mother of his children. The youngest of them became his only legitimate son, Wenceslaus II.

During the Imperial Imperial interregnum of 1250 to 1273, Ottokar could increase his personal influence while Richard of Cornwall and Alfonso of Castile jostled to attain the Imperial dignity. In 1266 he occupied the Egerland in north-west Bohemia, and in 1268 he signed an inheritance treaty with the Sponheim duke Ulrich III of Carinthia, succeeding him in Carinthia, Carniola and the Windic March the next year. In 1272 he also acquired Friuli. His rule was once again contested by the Hungarians on the field of battle. After another victory, Ottokar became the most powerful king within the Empire.

== The path to the final battle ==
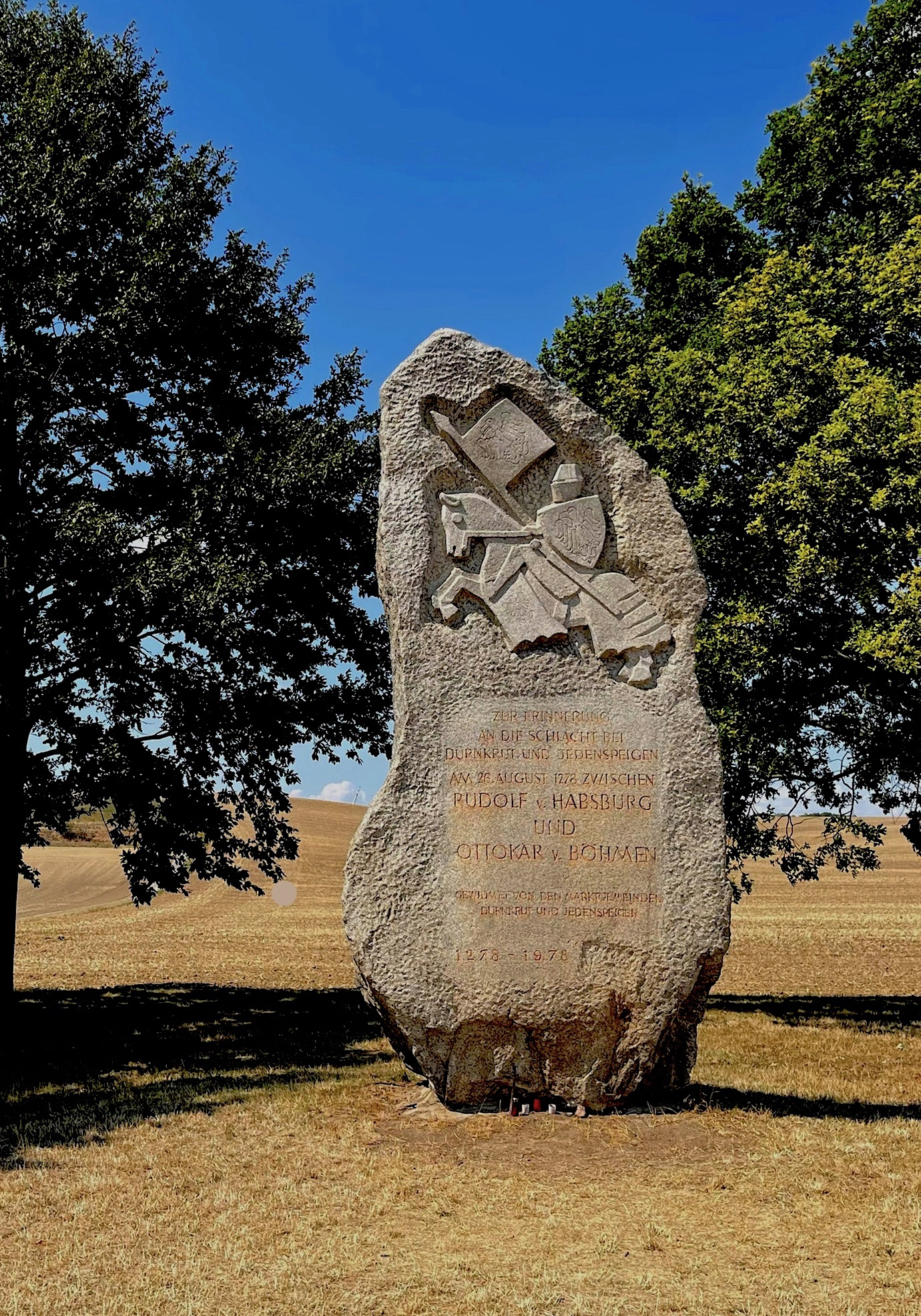
Monument to the battle on the Moravian Field near Dürnkrut in 1278

After Richard of Cornwall died in April 1272 and Pope Gregory X rejected the claims raised by Alfonso of Castile, a new election for the Imperial German throne took place in 1273. However, the Bohemian king again failed to win the Imperial crown, as the electors voted for the "little count" Rudolf of Habsburg, Ottokar's last and finally victorious rival.

Přemysl Ottokar refused to acknowledge Rudolf's election, and urged the Pope to adopt a similar policy. At a convention of the Imperial Diet at Nuremberg in 1274, Rudolf decreed that all Imperial lands that had changed hands since the death of the last Hohenstaufen emperor Frederick II must be returned to the crown. This would have deprived Ottokar not only of the Egerland, but also of the Austrian, Styrian, and Carinthian duchies. In 1275 Rudolf placed Ottokar under the Imperial ban and besieged his Hofburg residence in Vienna, while a rebellion led by the Vítkovci noble Záviš of Falkenstein disrupted the Bohemian lands. This compelled Přemysl Ottokar in November 1276 to sign a new treaty by which he gave up all claims to Austria and the neighboring duchies, retaining for himself only Bohemia and Moravia. Ottokar's son Wenceslaus became betrothed to Rudolf's daughter Judith. There followed an uneasy peace.

Two years later, the Bohemian king made a last attempt to recover his lost lands by force. Přemysl Ottokar again found allies in Bavaria, Brandenburg and Poland. He collected a large army to meet the forces of Rudolf and his ally King Ladislaus IV of Hungary in the Battle on the Marchfeld on 26 August 1278, where he was defeated and killed. Rudolf had his body laid out in state at the Minorites Church in Vienna. (In 1297 Ottokar's mortal remains were finally transferred to St. Vitus Cathedral in Prague.) His 6-year-old son Wenceslaus II succeeded him as King of Bohemia.

== Marriage and children ==
On 11 February 1252, Přemysl Ottokar II married Margaret of Austria. Margaret was 26 years older than he, and the couple's childless marriage ended with an annulment. On 25 October 1261, Ottokar married Kunigunda of Slavonia. They had six children:

- Kunigunde (January 1265 – 27 November 1321), married Boleslaus II of Masovia
- Agnes of Bohemia, Duchess of Austria (5 September 1269 – 17 May 1296), married Rudolf II, Duke of Austria
- Wenceslaus II (17 September 1271 – 21 June 1305)
- Margaret (died in childhood)
- Two unnamed sons (died in childhood)

Ottokar also had two extramarital sons and daughters. The most important was his firstborn, Nicholas. He was never accepted as heir apparent to the Bohemian crown by the sitting pope, but was given the Duchy of Opava as fief in 1269. Other illegitimate children include John, provost of Vyšehrad Chapter.

== Legacy ==
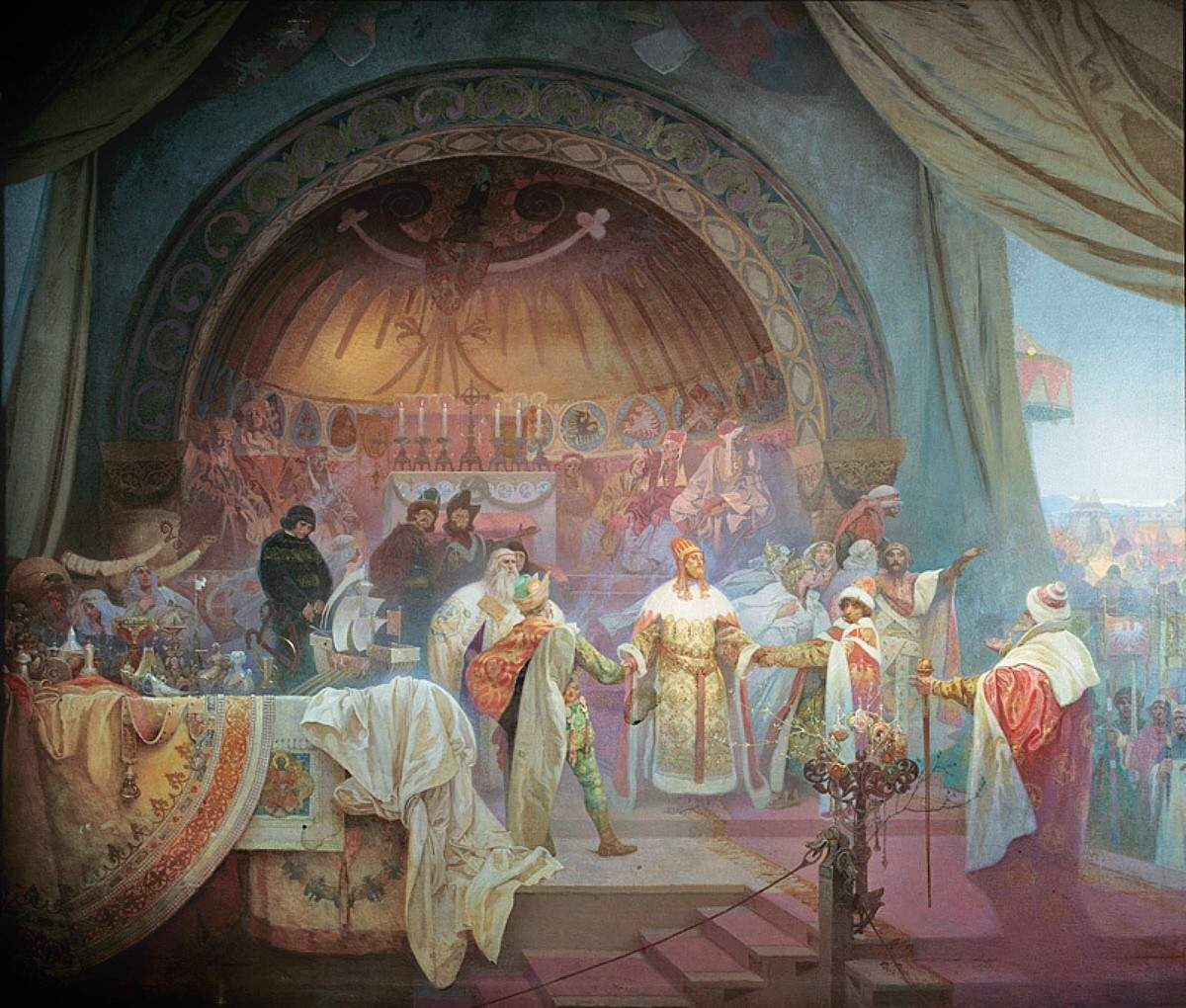
In the painting, Přemysl Otakar II: The Union of Slavic Dynasties (1924), part of Alphonse Mucha's 20-canvas work The Slav Epic, Ottokar is depicted at his niece's wedding celebration, forging alliances with other Slavic rulers in attendance.

Přemysl Ottokar is considered one of the greatest kings of Bohemia, along with Charles IV. He was a founder of many new towns (about 30 — not only in Bohemia, Moravia and Silesia, but also in Austria and Styria) and incorporated many existing settlements through civic charters, giving them new privileges. He was a strong proponent of trade, law and order. Furthermore, he instituted open immigration policies through which skilled German-speaking immigrants settled in major cities throughout his domains. As noted, the historic East Prussian city of Königsberg (King's Mountain) was named in his honor as a tribute to his support of the Teutonic Knights in their war with the pagan Old Prussians.

As Czech traditional law was different from that of his other domains, many principles introduced during his reign formed core of the Czech law for the following centuries. From his time stems the oldest preserved source of Czech law, Zemské desky, and also the oldest written Czech communal law, recorded in the founding deeds of the respective towns. By supporting the city of Jihlava (German: Iglau) with its mines, he laid foundation of the silver wealth of later Bohemian kings. Privileges of civic charters usually excluded the towns from obedience to the traditional courts held by members of nobility. This can be seen as a step towards equality and a precursor of modern civil law.

In the country, Ottokar's introduction of the Law of Emphyteusis into the Czech law is sometimes interpreted as "Germanization". In fact it was creative, for it freed subjects from feudal obligations, except for rent — and tax, if such was levied. Free selling and leaving of estates could also be bought and soon became common. Thus, Ottokar can be reckoned an early Bohemian ruler who furthered Bohemian rights in medieval times. This change of legal environment in Bohemia was introduced by systematic founding of villages chartered under this law.

He issued also a general privilege to the Jews (1254), which established principles of integration of the Jews into the Czech society until 1848. The Jews were now eligible for various positions, such as servants of crown, thereby being somewhat less subject to discrimination. Instead of being able to claim only the support of individual lords, the Jews could from then on claim support of any royal officer.

Ottokar followed with a systematic policy of strengthening his domains by building fortifications. Besides supporting towns, he built many fortresses himself — Zvíkov Castle, Křivoklát Castle or Bezděz Castle in Bohemia, and the famed Hofburg Palace in Vienna — and also induced his vassals to build castles. A sign of rising strength of Bohemia, it was also a reaction to the Mongol raids of the 13th century (see Béla IV of Hungary). Conflict for the title of ownership to these fortified places built by members of nobility was probably the source of an uprising in 1276, which cost Ottokar the Austrian lands, and two years later (in an attempt for reconquest) his life.

Some of the fortresses built by Ottokar were for centuries the strongest in Bohemia. Ironically, Bezděz Castle served as a prison for his son Wenceslaus II of Bohemia for short time after Ottokar's death. The castle housed Bohemian legal records Zemské desky and many spiritual and temporal treasures during the destructive civil strife of the Hussite wars (1419–1434) in Bohemia. It was conquered in 1620, during the 30 Years' War, but by then it was long deserted, and in that state was defended by rebelling subjects against an Imperial army.

Before his conflict with Rudolf of Habsburg, Ottokar exacted influence over a number of relatives, allies and vassals in Germany, such as the Margraviate of Brandenburg — and spiritual principalities, including the Archbishopric of Salzburg and the Patriarchate of Aquileia. After the death of Konradin in 1268 he was an heir of the House of Hohenstaufen's claim to the imperial crown. However, he did not raise this claim, remaining content with informal influence in Germany. In 1267 he was appointed protector of the royal domains (of the Holy Roman Empire) east of the Rhine by the German king, Richard of Cornwall. He held this office till 1273.

Ottokar is a significant figure in history and legend. In the Divine Comedy by Dante, Ottokar is seen outside the gates of Purgatory, in amiable companionship with his imperial rival Rudolf. He is also the protagonist of a tragedy by the 19th-century Austrian playwright Franz Grillparzer, titled König Ottokars Glück und Ende.

There is a statue dedicated to him.

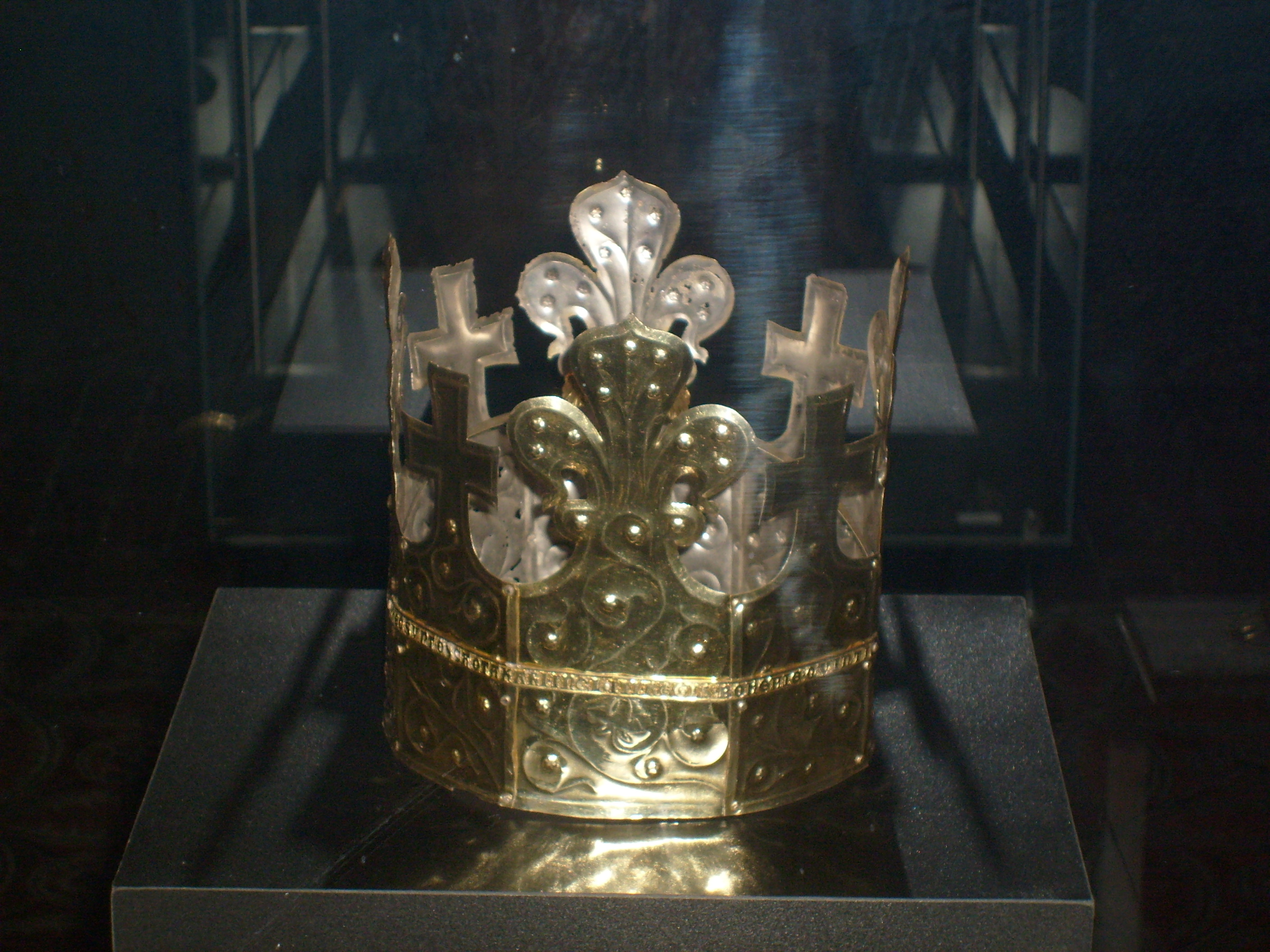
Burial crown of Ottokar II of Bohemia at Prague Castle

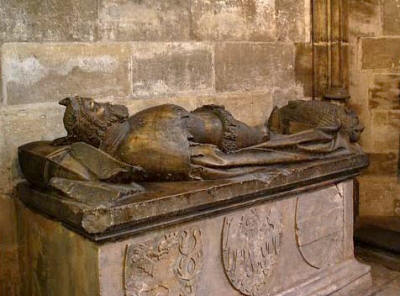
Tomb of Ottokar II in St. Vitus Cathedral, Prague

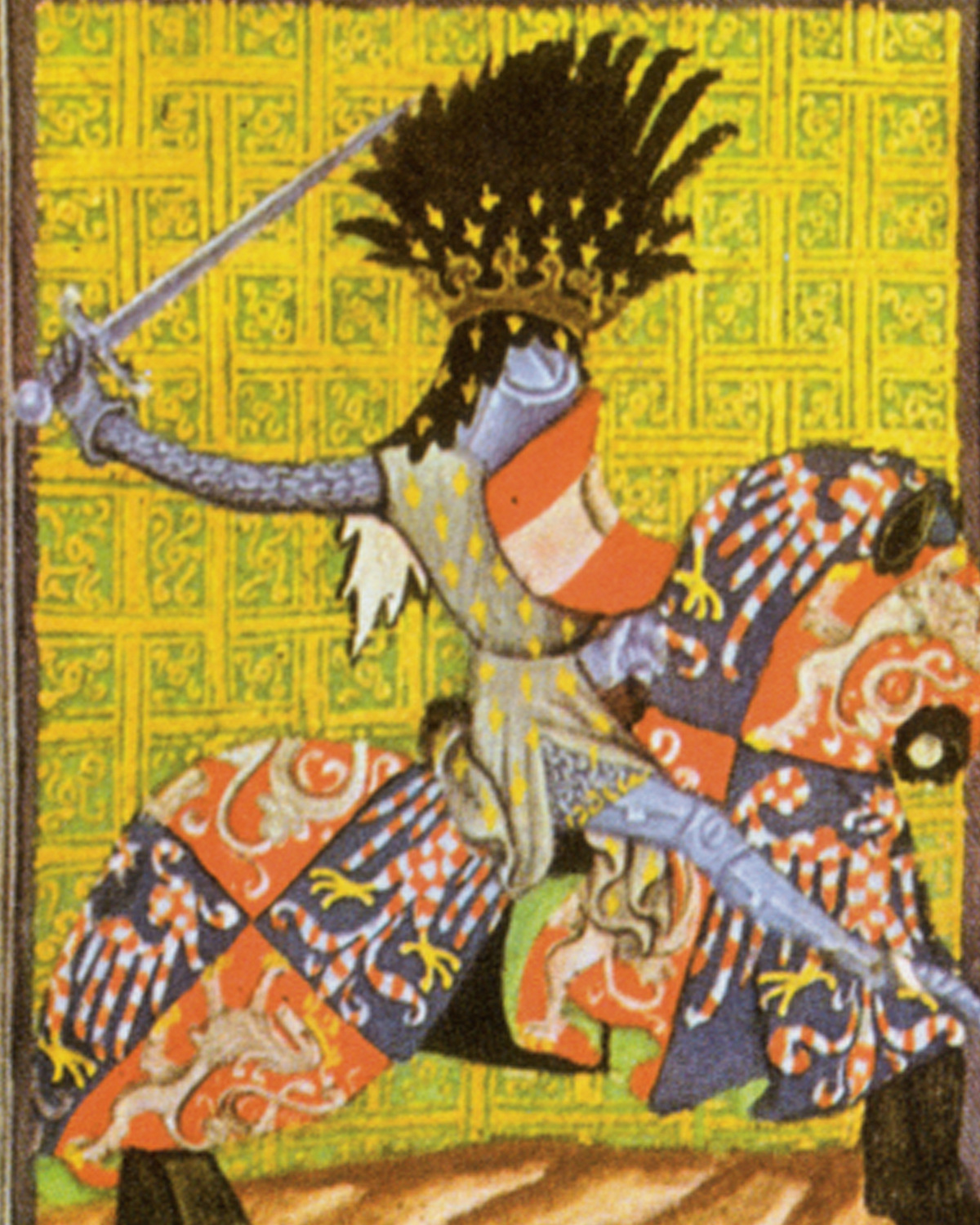
Ottokar II Přemysl in a miniature from the Gelnhausen Codex

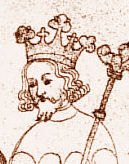
Depiction in the Zbraslav Chronicle by Peter of Zittau, 14th century

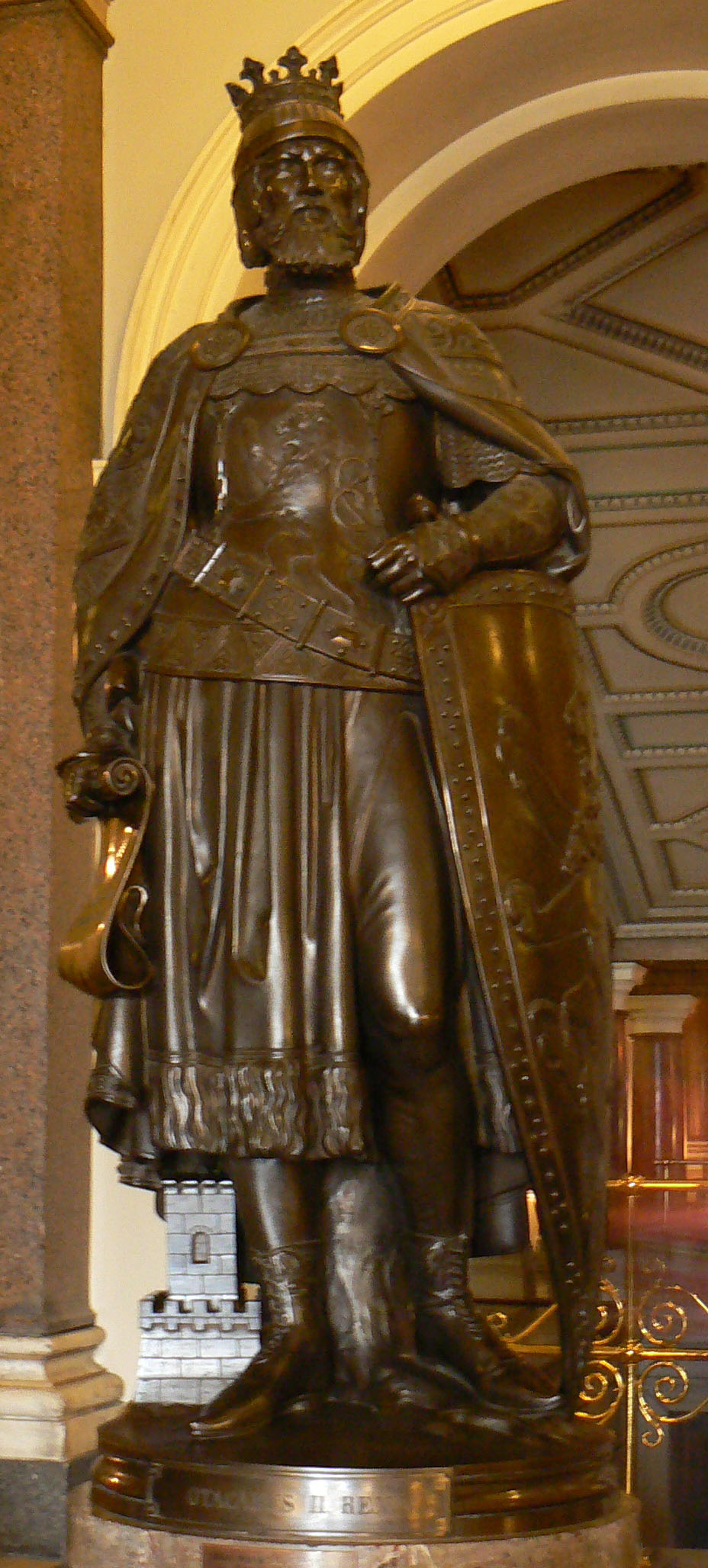
Otacarvs II. rex, statue by Ludwig von Schwanthaler (1847) placed at the National Museum in Prague (symbol of keep at his right foot is reminiscent of the many castles and towns, which he founded)

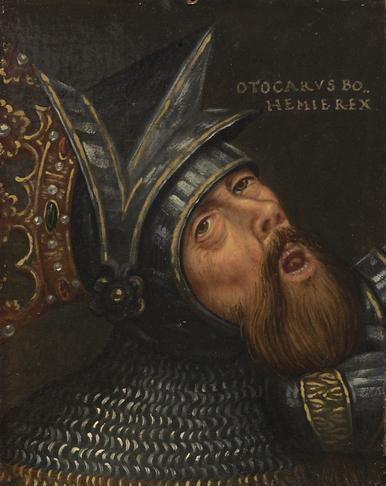
Ottokar II of Bohemia

== Sources ==
- Engel, Pál (2005). Realm of St. Stephen: A History of Medieval Hungary. I.B. Tauris.
- Gladysz, Mikolaj (2012). The Forgotten Crusaders: Poland and the Crusader Movement in the Twelfth and Thirteenth Century. Brill.
- Haverkamp, Alfred (1988). Medieval Germany 1056–1273. Translated by Braun, Helga; Mortimer, Richard. Oxford University Press.
- Kuthan, Jiří (1996). Přemysl Ottokar II (in German). Translated by Cemus, Petronilla; Reinerova, Lenka; Sedmidubska, Ursel. Bohlau Verlag Wien.
- Sedlar, Jean W (1994). East Central Europe in the Middle Ages, 1000–1500. Vol. III. University of Washington Press.
- Tucker, Spencer C., ed. (2010). A Global Chronology of Conflict: From the Ancient World to the Modern Middle East. Vol. I. ABC-CLIO.
- Veszpremy, Laszlo; Schaer, Frank, eds. (1999). Deeds of the Hungarians. Central European University Press.

Ottokar II of Bohemia House of Přemyslid Born: c. 1233 Died: 26 August 1278
Regnal titles
Preceded by Wenceslaus I	King of Bohemia; 1253–1278	Succeeded by Wenceslaus II
Preceded by Frederick II	Duke of Austria and Styria; 1251/1260–1276	Succeeded by Rudolf I
Preceded by Ulrich III	Duke of Carinthia; Margrave of Carniola; 1269–1276	Succeeded by Rudolf I
