= Komořany =

- Cadastral Area of Prague
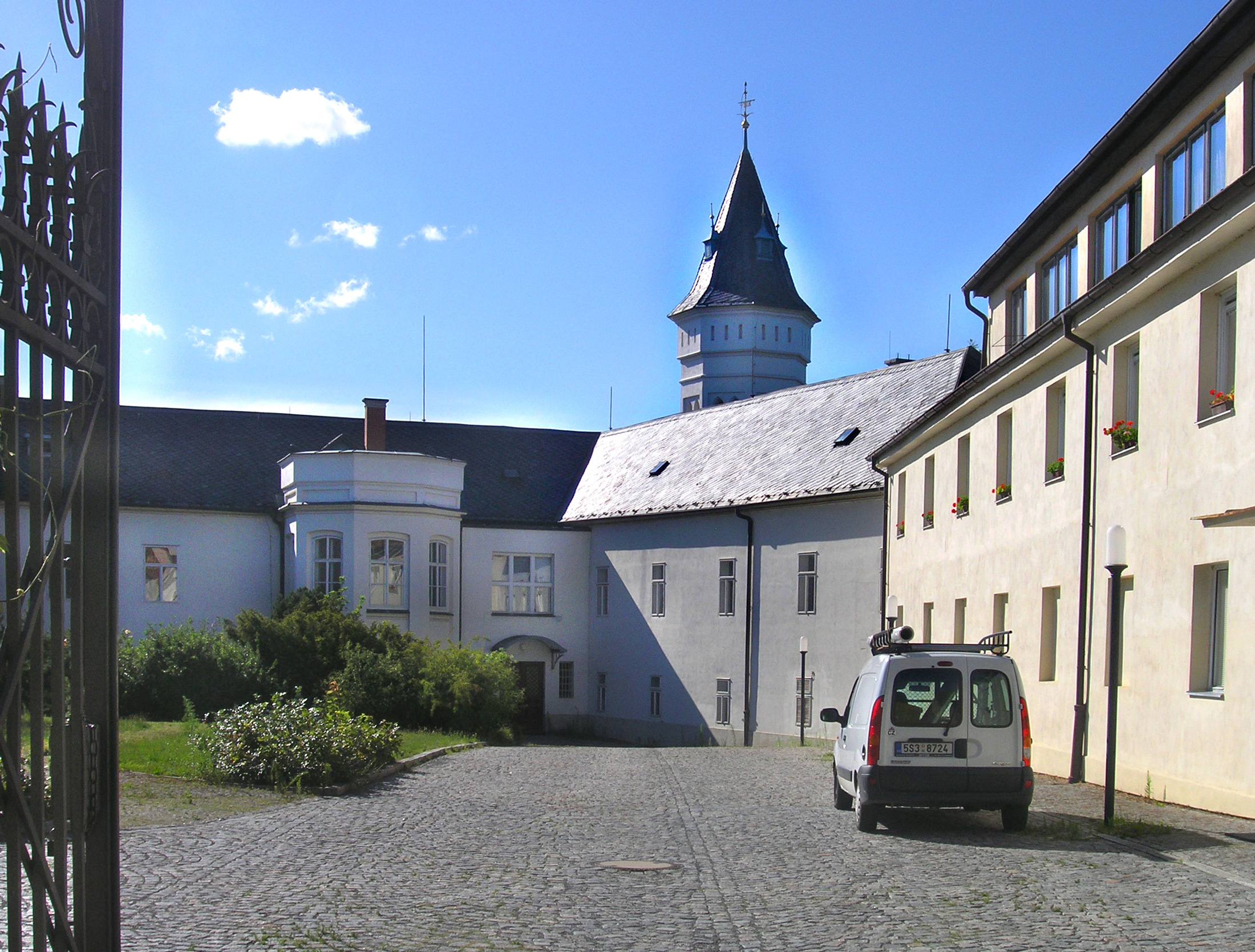
- Courtyard of Komořany château

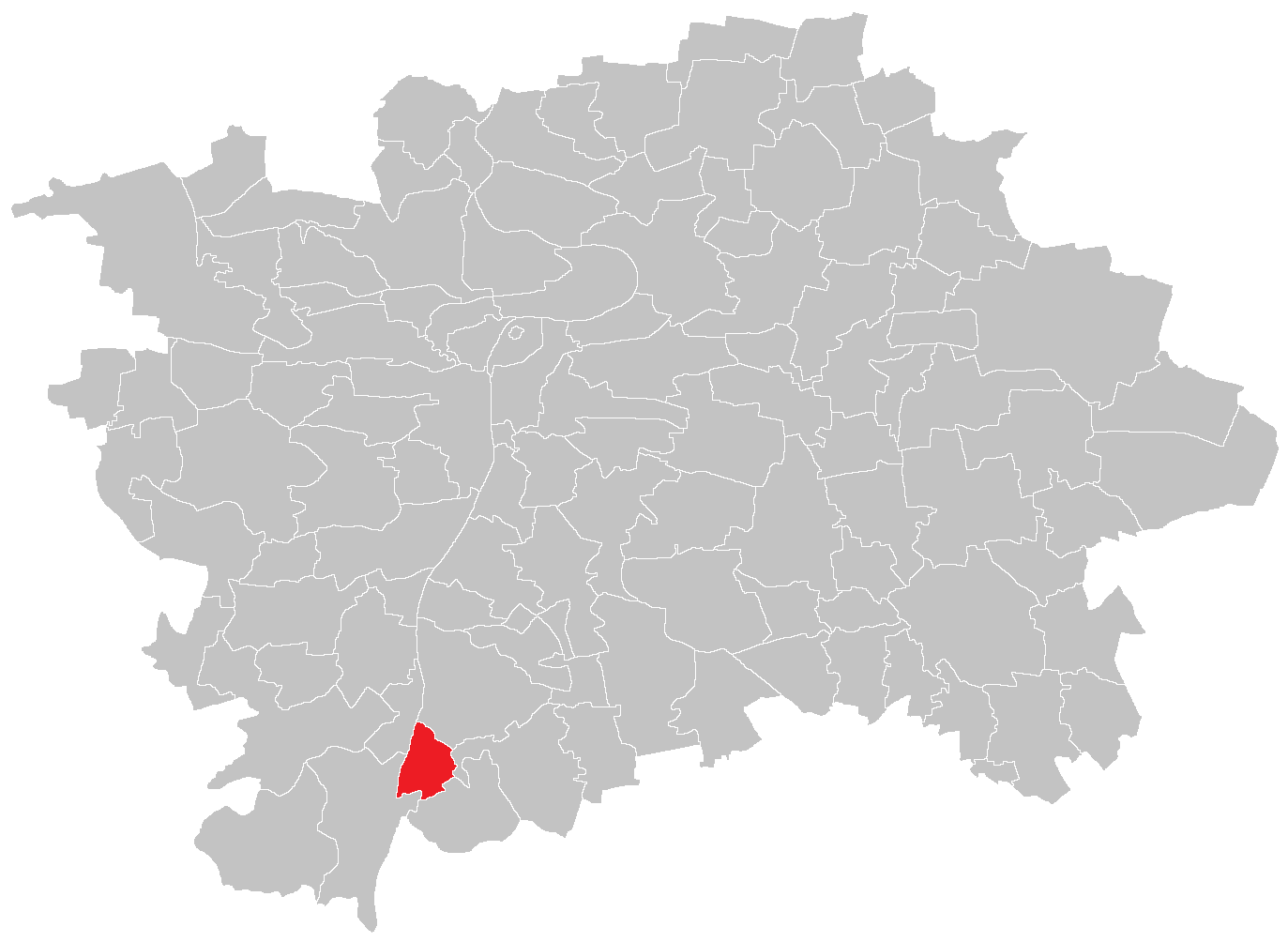
- Location of Komořany in Prague
- Coordinates: 50°59′25″N 14°24′38″E
- Country: Czech Republic
- Region: Prague
- District: Prague 12

Area
  - Total: 2.08 km^{2} (0.80 sq mi)

Population (2021)
  - Total: 1,885
  - Density: 906/km^{2} (2,350/sq mi)
- Time zone: UTC+1 (CET)
  - Summer (DST): UTC+2 (CEST)
- Postal code: 143 00

Komořany (German: Komoran) is a former village which is now a cadastral subdivision of the municipal district of Prague 12.

== History ==
Komořany was recorded in 1088 as "Comoraz", a settlement belonging to the Vyšehrad Chapter. The name derives from komora (in the sense of royal or aristocratic property, rent or income), referring to the land on which the villagers dwelt. Other records indicate that the land (or parts of it) was owned by Wenceslas II (until 1304), the Scholastic Dobeš (until 1332), the Zbraslav monastery (until 1436), George of Poděbrady until 1470)) and Václav Šturm of Hyršfeldu (who added the title seat to the village, after 1589). In 1638 it became the property of the Zbraslav monastery. In 1785, however, the Zbraslav monastery was closed, and Komořany devolved to the secular trust, which sold the Komořany chateau, grounds and sheepfold to the Prince of Oettingen-Wallerstein 40 years later. In 1866, it was sold to an Albertan knight.

In the meantime, the Komořany cadastral municipality was created, and in the 19th century, they formed a shared political community with Točná. For that reason, in Malý Otto's dictionary of 1904, Komořany is listed simply as a chateau near the village of Točná. Komořany became an independent community on 20 May 1957,. On 14 June 1964 the villages of Komořany and Modřany were amalgamated as a town, which was subsequently annexed to Prague 4 on 1 January 1968. At that time, Komořany had 1,107 residents and 133 residences. In the 1990 administrative reform of Prague's districts, Komořany became part of the district of Prague-Modřany, which was renamed Prague 12 in 1994.

== Geography ==
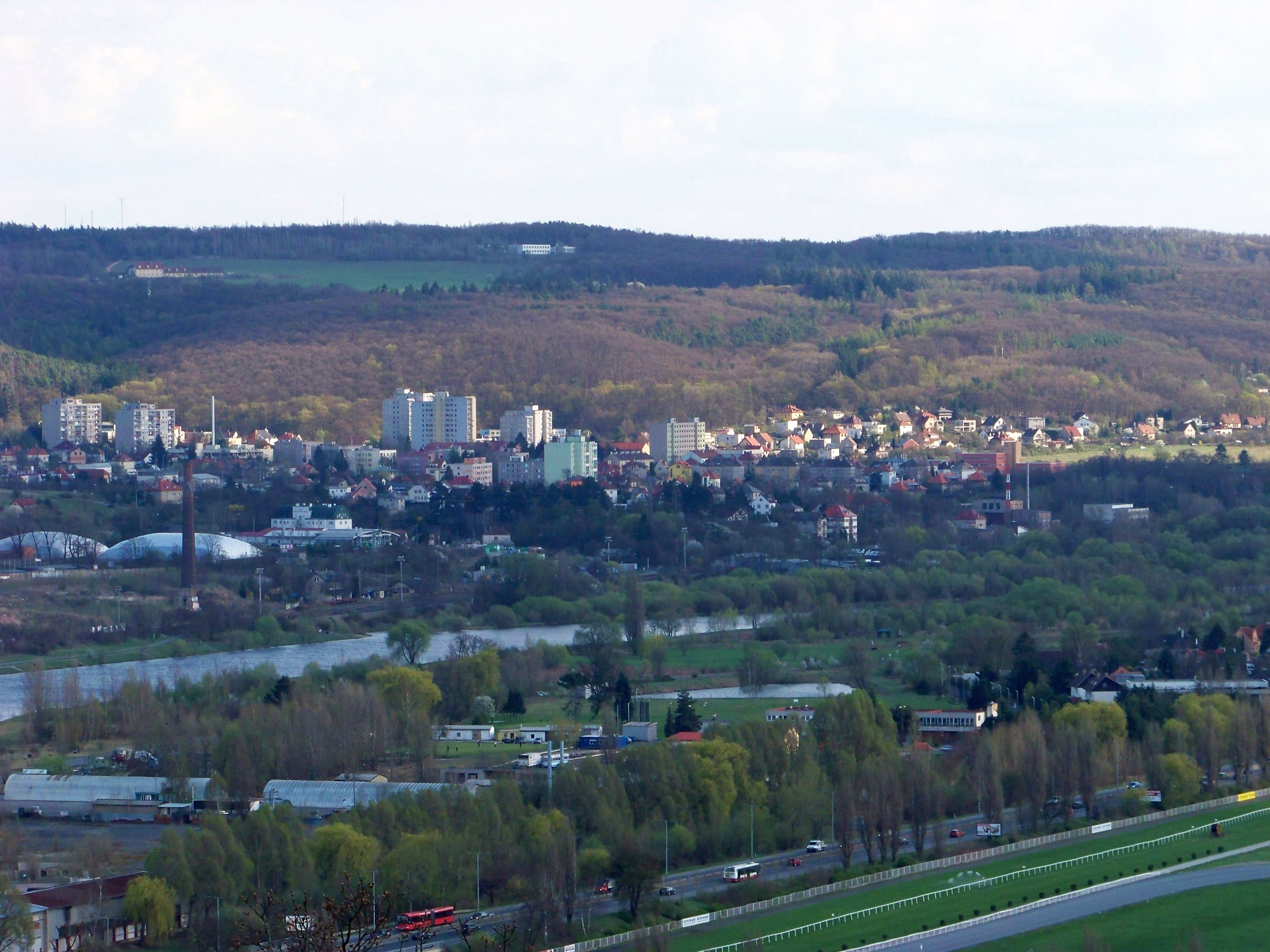
View of Komorany from Chuchle

The main thoroughfare through Komořany is Komořanská street. The unnamed square formed by Kyslíková, Komořanská and Revoluce streets forms Komořany's natural center. However, that square, the Sigma Modřany industrial park, and the northeastern part of the Komořany housing estate all technically fall within Modřany's cadastral subdivision, despite being separated from Modřany by a wooded creek valley.

The territory of Komořany is bounded on the west by the Vltava river's right bank. The Komořanská stream bisects the municipality, flowing into the Vltava. To the south, the unnamed creek which flows from Točná separates Komořany from Závist. This area has many cottages and garden plots, as does the area on the edge of the Modřany Gully park.

The headquarters of the Czech Hydrometeorological Institute is located in the south-eastern part of Komořany, next to the chateau and the Šabatka estate. In 2000, the estate was renovated into an equestrian center, which is now the home of the Epona Praha equestrian club.

Railway line 210 passes through Komořany on the right bank of the Vltava, connecting Prague with Vrané nad Vltavou. The Praha-Komořany railway station opened in 1997, replacing the nearby Prague-Modřany station, which had been closed to passenger traffic in 1991. A spur line to the Sigma Modřany industrial park carried passenger traffic during a brief period in 1995 while Komořanská street was under reconstruction. Komořany is served by bus lines 165 and 139, with some 165 buses continuing on to Závist and Zbraslav.

The southern part of Komořany is bisected by Prague's Outer Ring Road. The ring road crosses the Vltava river valley above grade - a structure known as the Radotínský Bridge. The east of the bridge lands in Komořany, where an unfinished intersection awaits the completion of the Komořany bypass, before continuing on into the east portal of the Komořany tunnel. There was a dispute over the partial construction of the intersection, fueled by controversy over construction of the bypass itself and irregularities in the building permits.

== Demographics ==
Historical population

Year	Pop.	±%
1961	1,178	—
1970	1,107	−6.0%
1980	1,711	+54.6%
1991	2,077	+21.4%

Year	Pop.	±%
2001	1,742	−16.1%
2011	1,869	+7.3%
2021	1,885	+0.9%

Source: Censuses

== Photo gallery ==
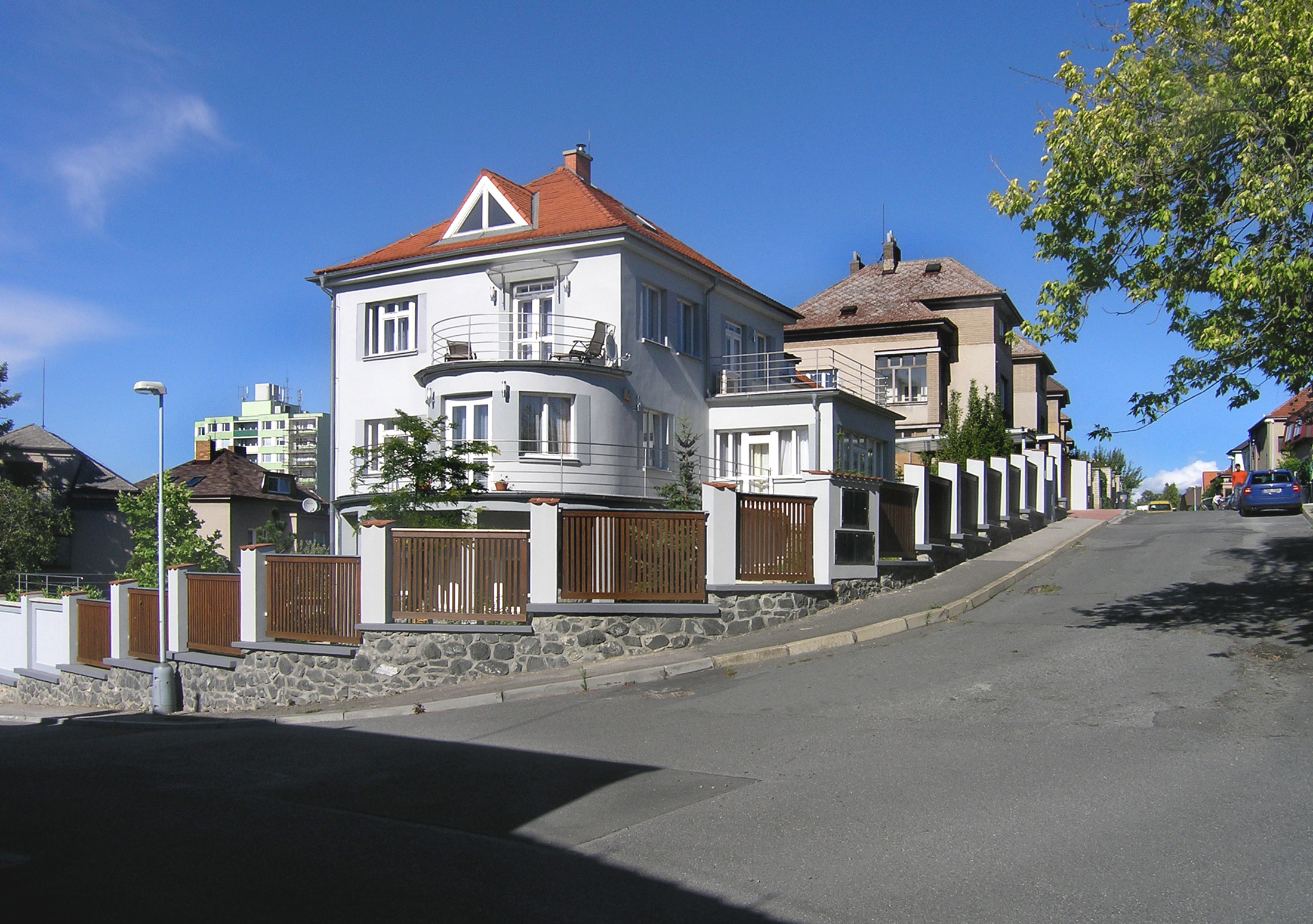
Villas on Okružní street

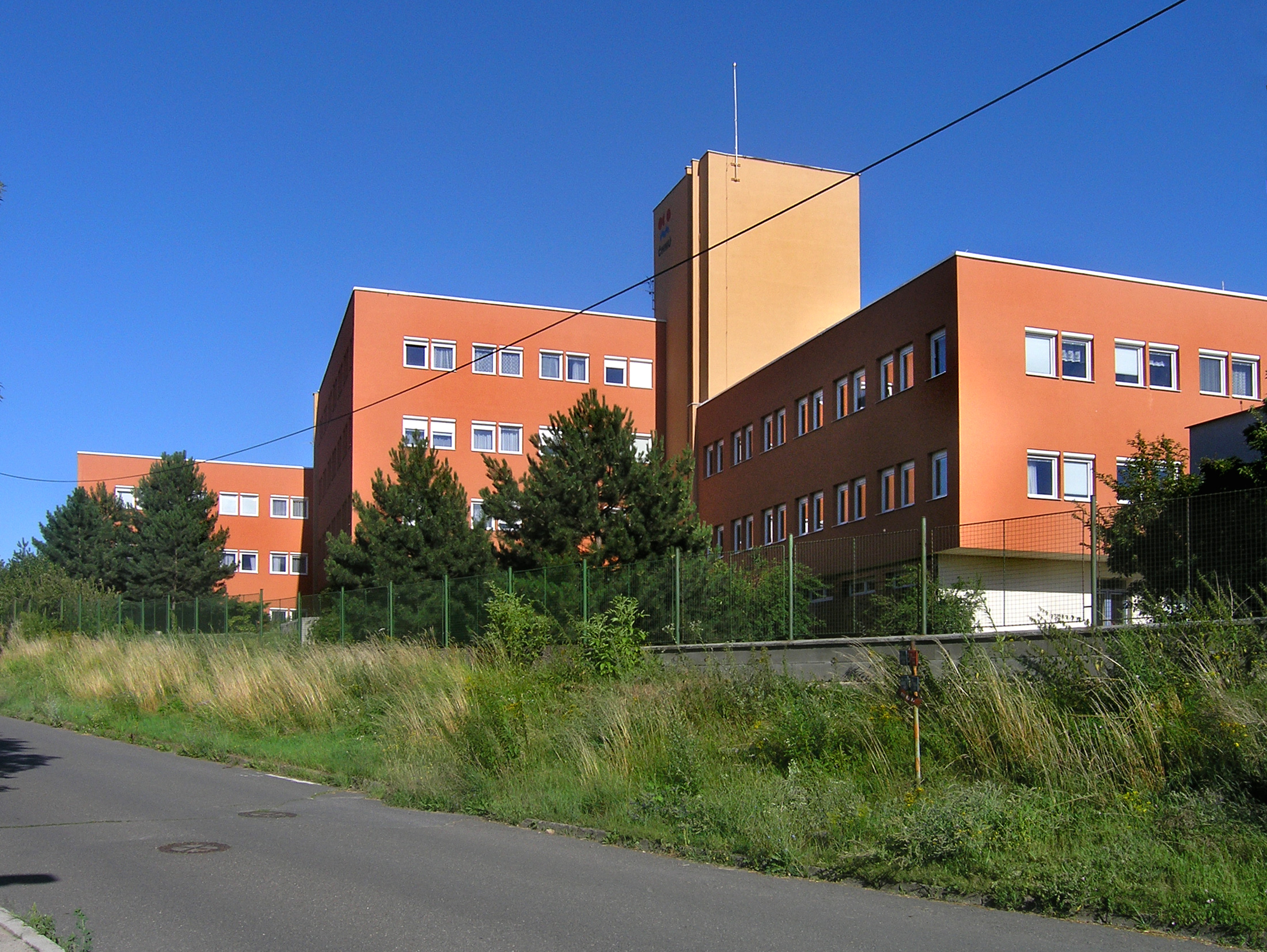
Czech Hydrometeorological Institute

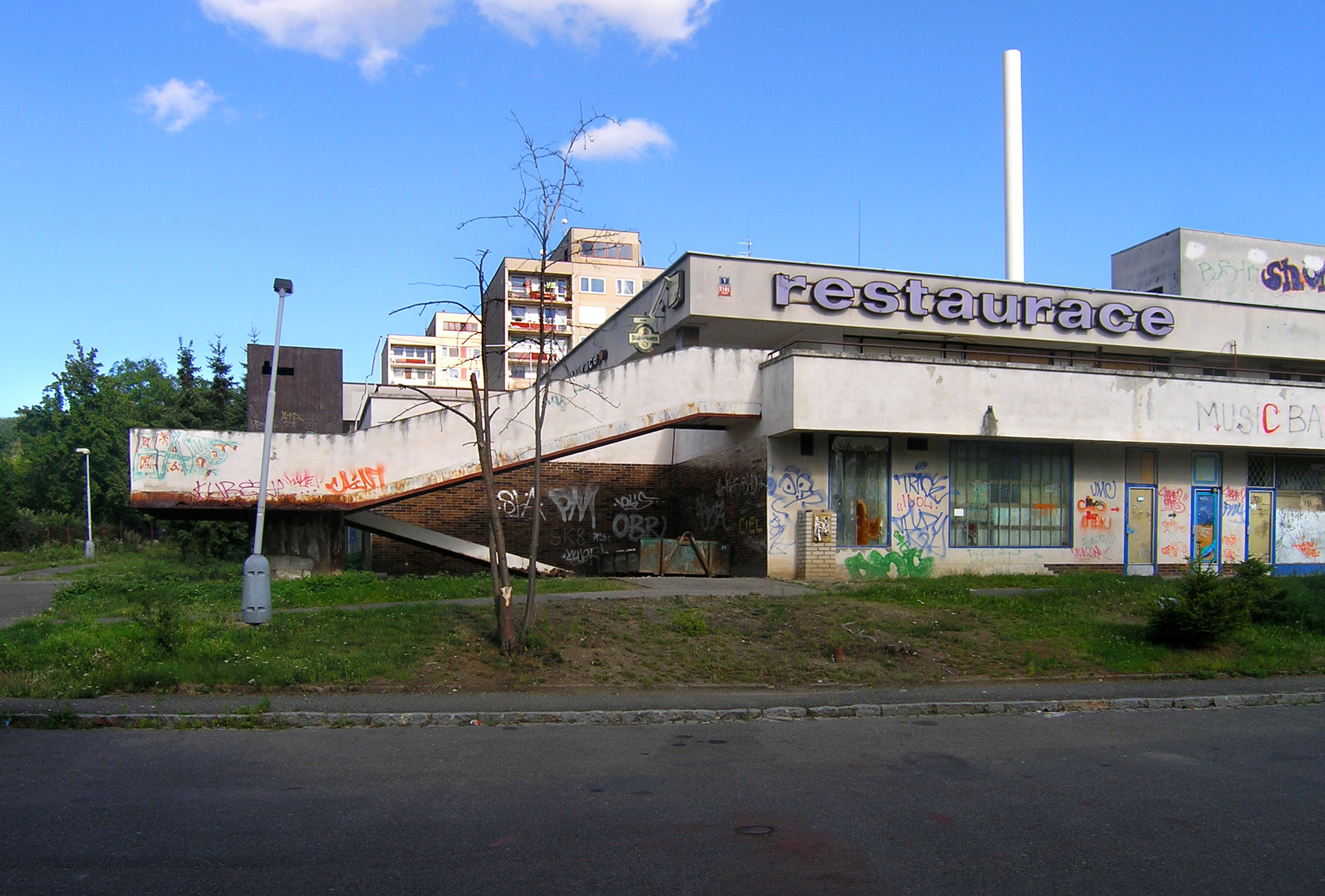
Abandoned shopping centre (reconstructed in 2008)

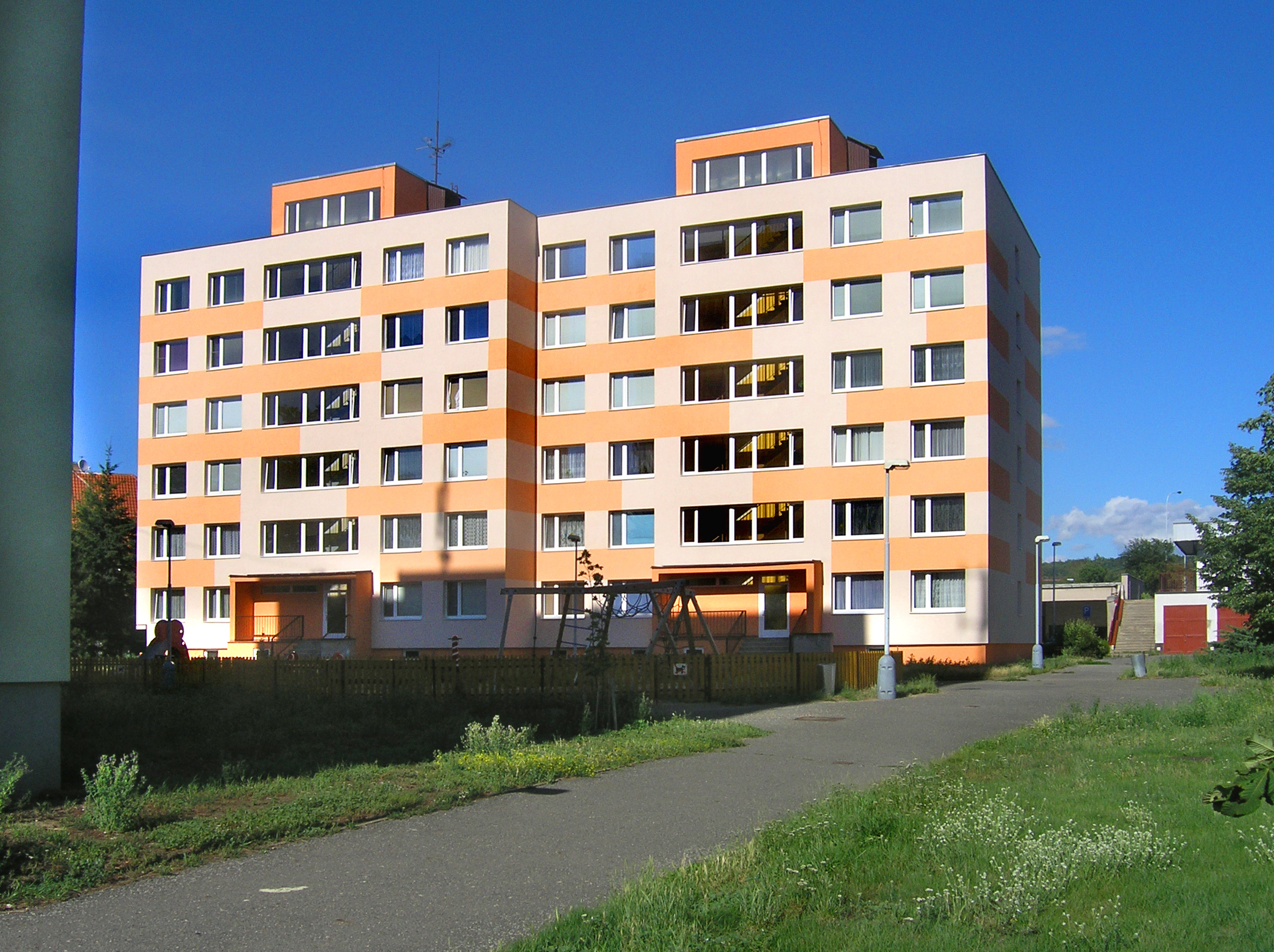
U Vlečky housing estate

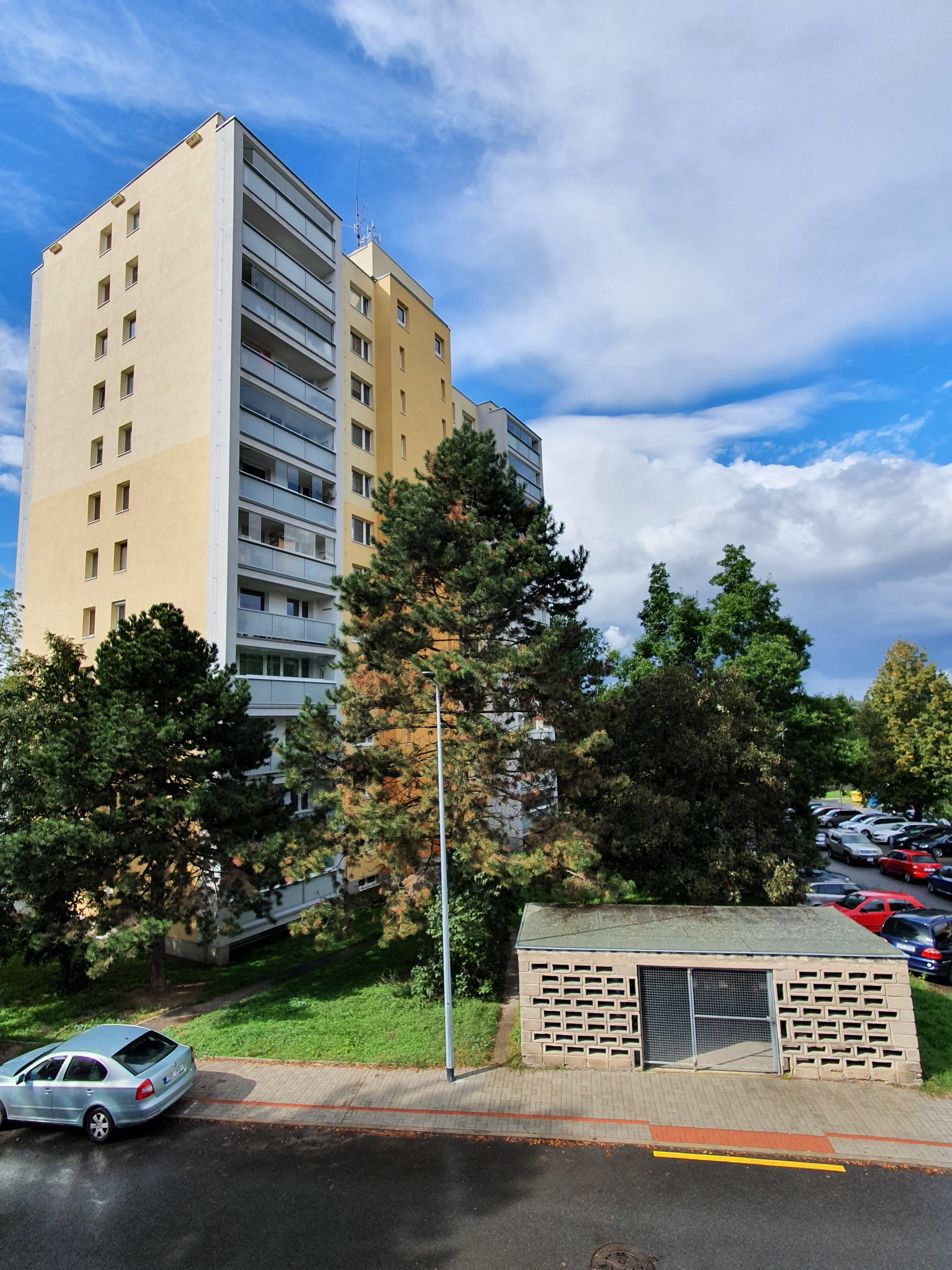
Za Sídlištěm street
