= Zbraslav Monastery =

Czech monastery (1292–1789)

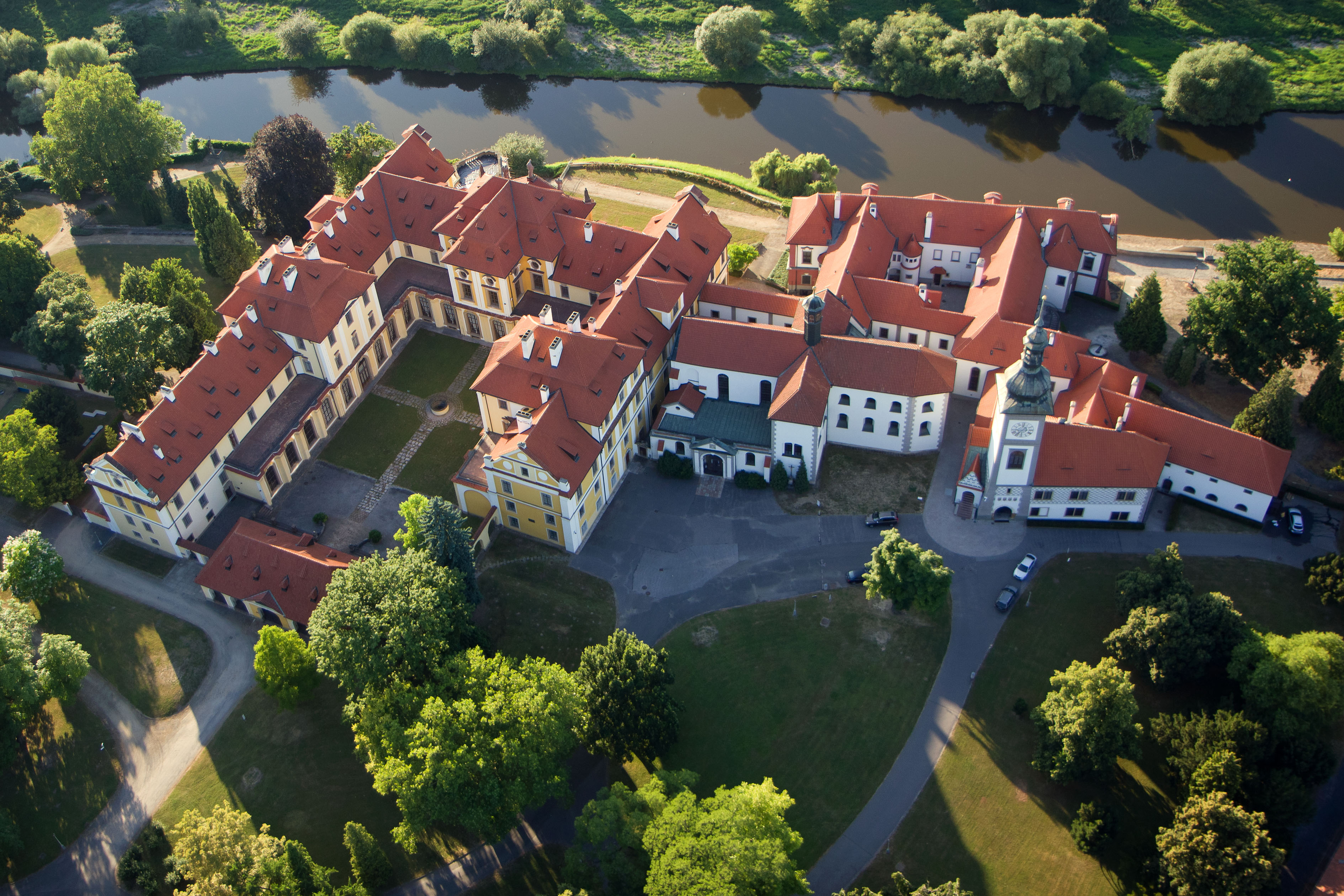
The buildings of the former Zbraslav abbey

The Cistercian Abbey of Zbraslav (Latin: Aula Regia, Czech: Zbraslavský klášter, German: Kloster Königsaal) located in Zbraslav near Prague (today part of Prague) was one of the most significant monasteries of the Cistercian Order in the Kingdom of Bohemia (present-day Czech Republic). Founded by King Wenceslaus II of Bohemia in 1292 it became the royal necropolis of the last members of the Přemyslid dynasty. The abbey was abolished by the Bohemian King and Holy Roman Emperor Joseph II in 1789. The best-known abbot of this monastery was Peter of Zittau († 1339) who wrote the Zbraslav Chronicle (Latin: Chronicon Aulae Regiae), the most important historical source for the history of Bohemia in the first half of the 14th century. The Zbraslav abbey is also known for the Madonna of Zbraslav, an outstanding Gothic painting from the 1340s.

== See also ==
- Czech Gothic architecture
- Czech Baroque architecture
