= Polní Voděrady =

- Municipality
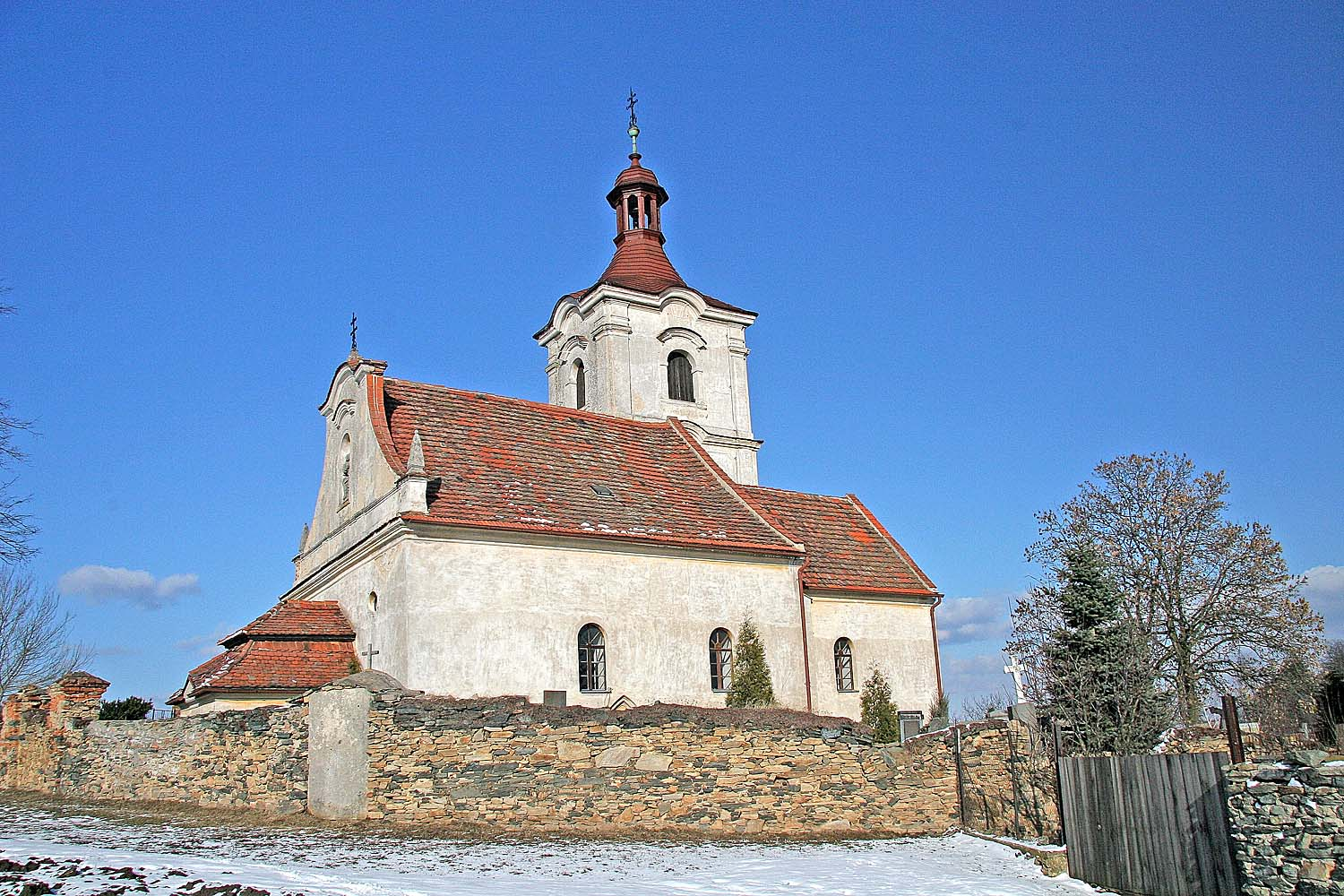
- Church of the Visitation of the Virgin Mary

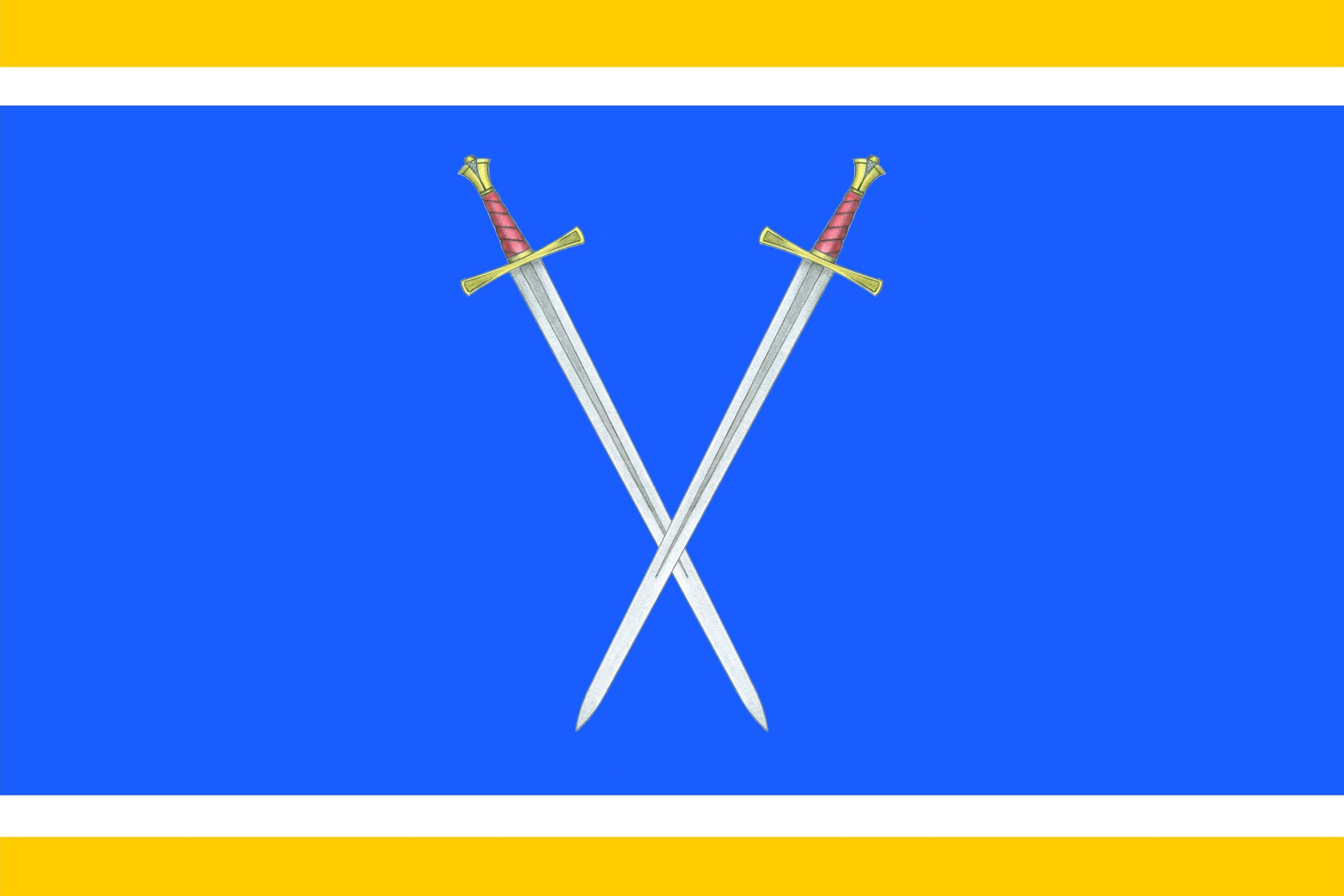
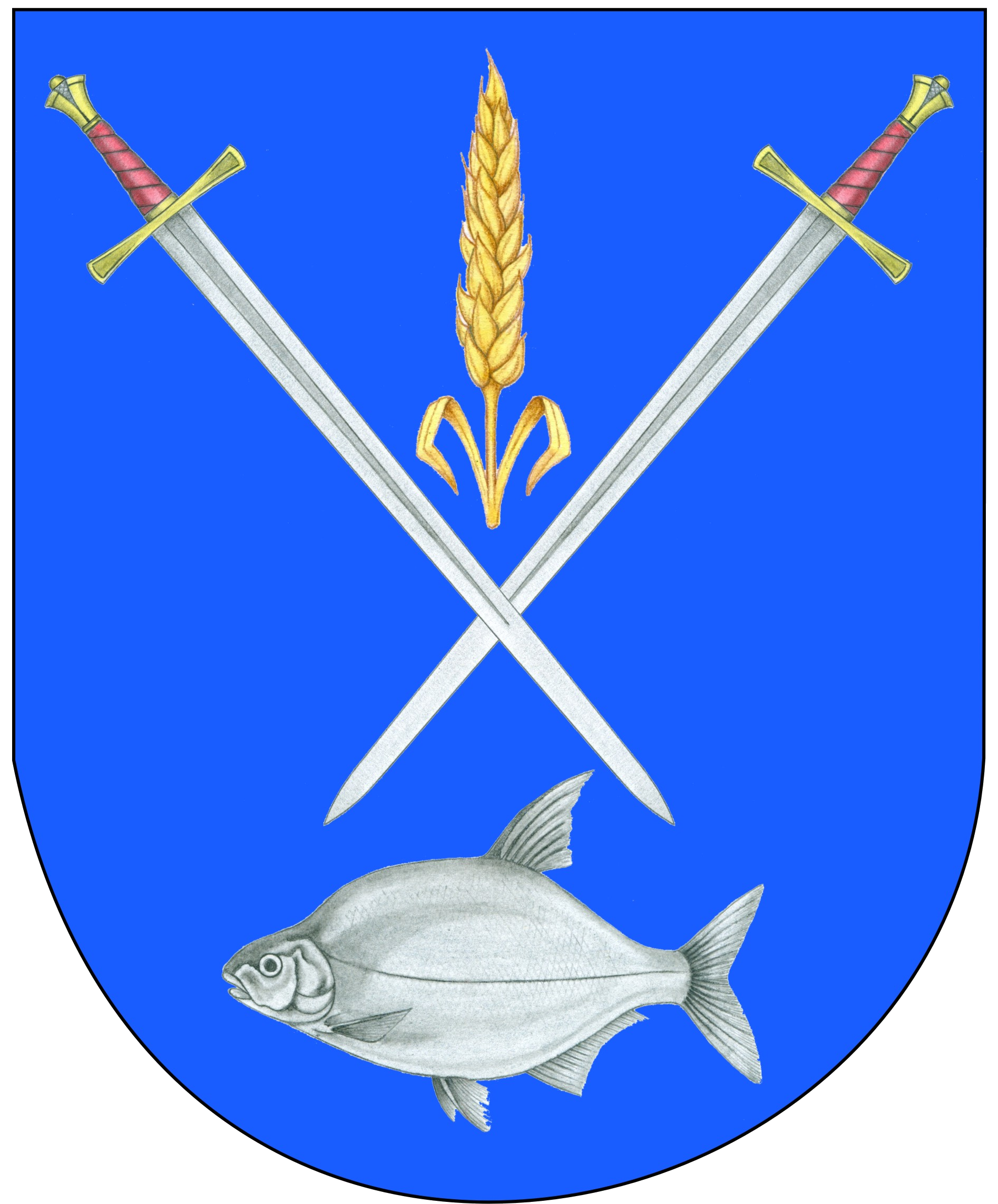
- Flag Coat of arms

- Location in the Czech Republic
- Coordinates: 49°59′33″N 15°5′43″E
- Country: Czech Republic
- Region: Central Bohemian
- District: Kolín
- First mentioned: 1088

Area
  - Total: 4.07 km^{2} (1.57 sq mi)
- Elevation: 305 m (1,001 ft)

Population (2026-01-01)
  - Total: 209
  - Density: 51.4/km^{2} (133/sq mi)
- Time zone: UTC+1 (CET)
  - Summer (DST): UTC+2 (CEST)
- Postal code: 280 02
- Website: www.polnivoderady.cz

Polní Voděrady is a municipality and village in Kolín District in the Central Bohemian Region of the Czech Republic. It has about 200 inhabitants.

It is located about 8 kilometres (5 mi) southwest of Kolín and 49 kilometres (30 mi) east of Prague.

== History ==
The first written mention of Polní Voděrady is from 1088, when it was owned by the Vyšehrad Chapter.

== Demographics ==
Historical population
Year	Pop.	±%
1869	434	—
1880	446	+2.8%
1890	445	−0.2%
1900	436	−2.0%
1910	443	+1.6%
1921	403	−9.0%
1930	400	−0.7%
1950	310	−22.5%
1961	303	−2.3%
1970	237	−21.8%
1980	206	−13.1%
1991	154	−25.2%
2001	129	−16.2%
2011	159	+23.3%
2021	208	+30.8%
Source: Censuses
