= Zlonín =

- Municipality
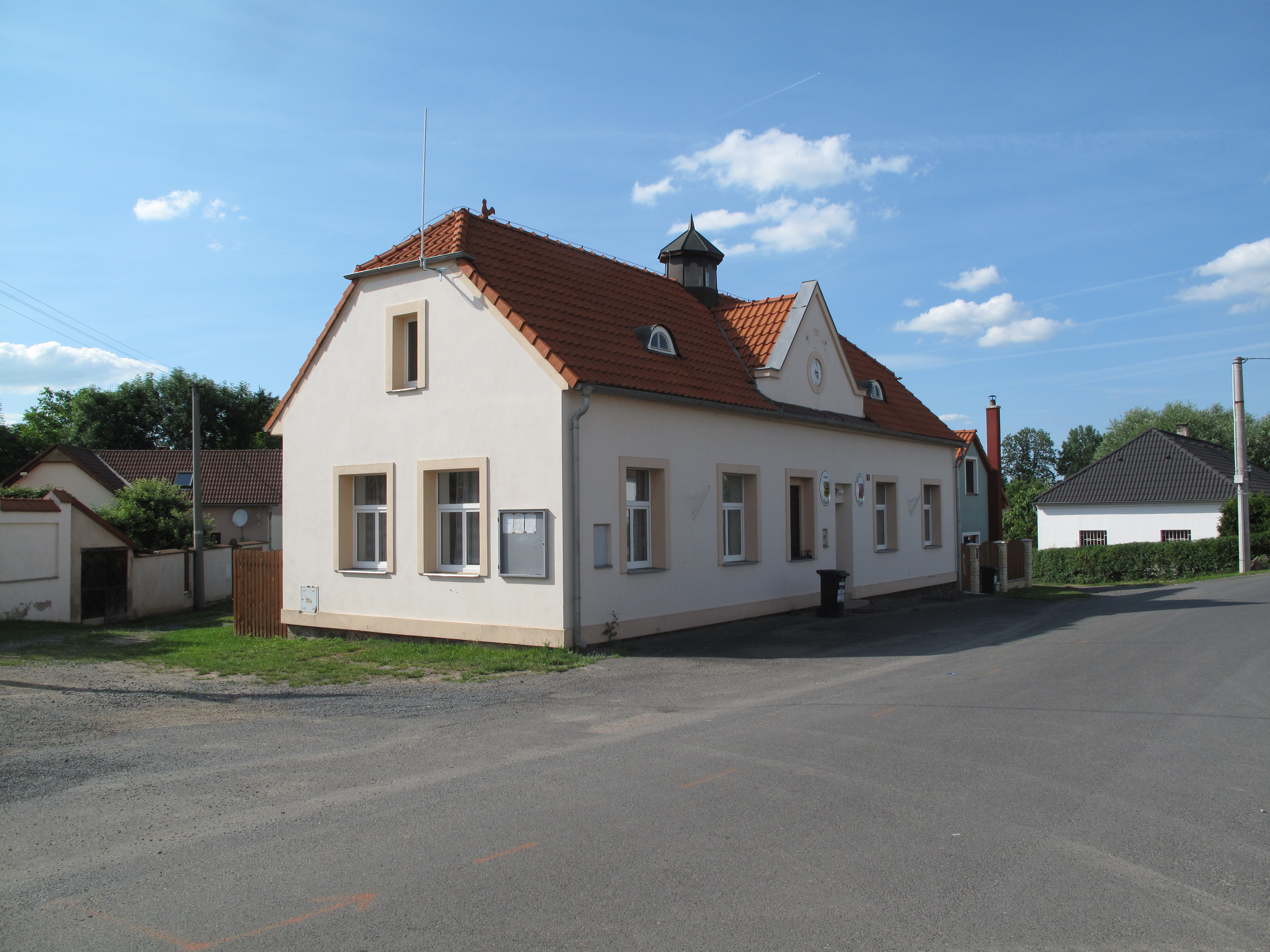
- Municipal office

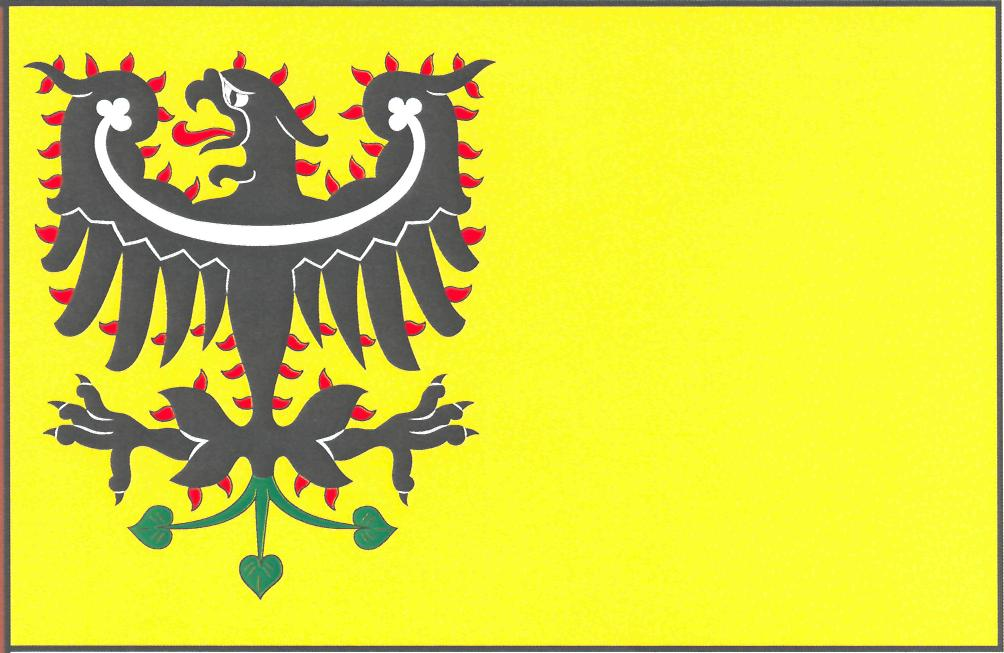
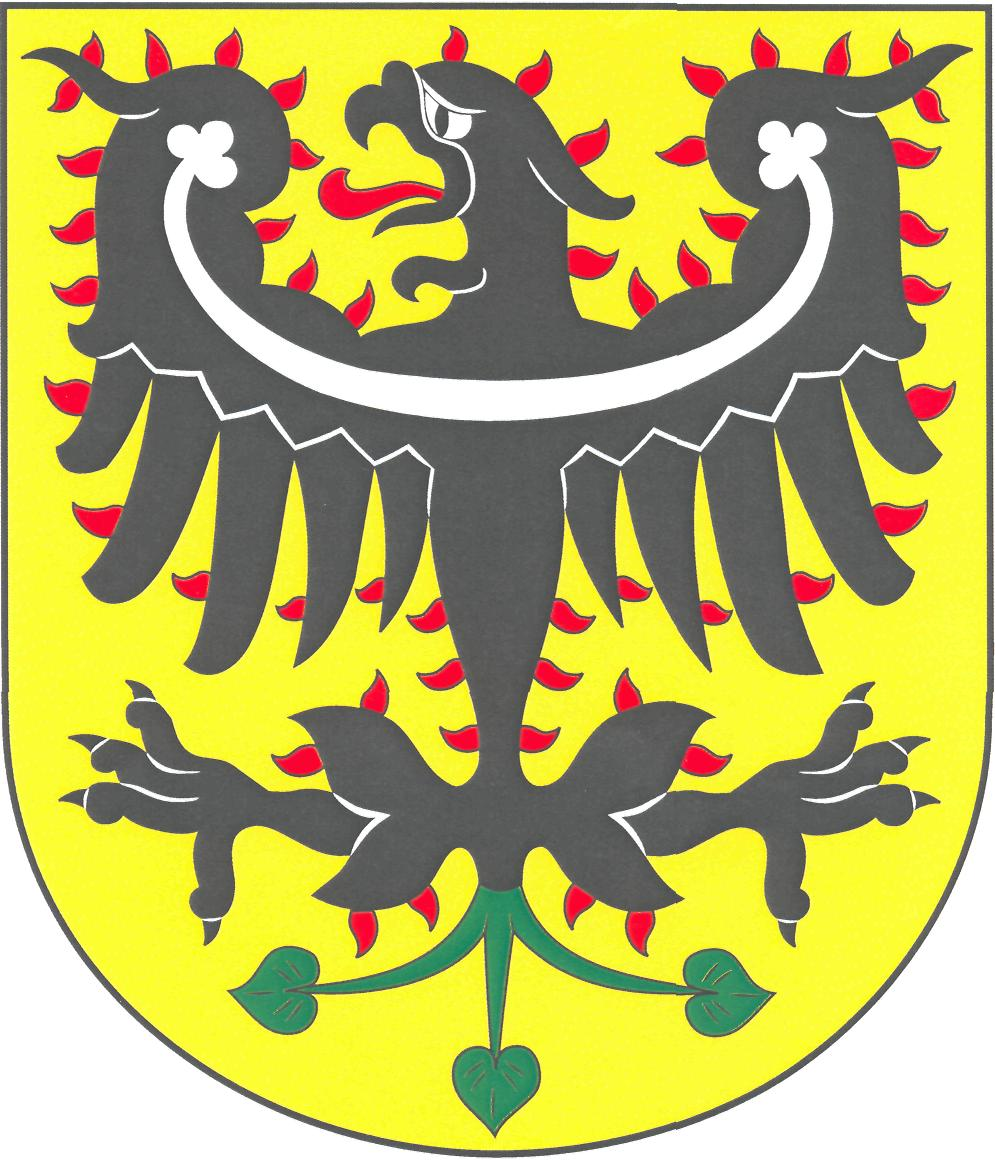
- Flag Coat of arms

- Location in the Czech Republic
- Coordinates: 50°12′57″N 14°30′28″E
- Country: Czech Republic
- Region: Central Bohemian
- District: Prague-East
- First mentioned: 1367

Area
  - Total: 3.09 km^{2} (1.19 sq mi)
- Elevation: 195 m (640 ft)

Population (2026-01-01)
  - Total: 1,421
  - Density: 460/km^{2} (1,190/sq mi)
- Time zone: UTC+1 (CET)
  - Summer (DST): UTC+2 (CEST)
- Postal code: 250 64
- Website: www.zlonin.cz

Zlonín is a municipality and village in Prague-East District in the Central Bohemian Region of the Czech Republic. It has about 1,400 inhabitants. As of 2025, the municipality has the youngest population in the country.

== Etymology ==
The name is derived from the personal name Zloňa, meaning "Zloňa's".

== Geography ==
Zlonín is located about 12 kilometres (7 mi) north of Prague. It lies in a flat agricultural landscape in the Central Elbe Table. The stream Zlonínský potok flows through the municipality.

== History ==
The first written mention of Zlonín is from 1367, when the village was owned by the Vyšehrad Chapter. Between 1436 and 1578, it was owned by various lesser noblemen and burghers. From 1578 until the establishment of a sovereign municipality in the mid-19th century, Zlonín belonged to the Dejvice estate and shared its owners.

== Demographics ==
As of 31 December 2025, with an average age of 31.5 years, the municipality has the youngest population in the Czech Republic.

Historical population

| Year | Pop. | ±% |
|---|---|---|
| 1869 | 287 | — |
| 1880 | 281 | −2.1% |
| 1890 | 264 | −6.0% |
| 1900 | 282 | +6.8% |
| 1910 | 317 | +12.4% |

| Year | Pop. | ±% |
|---|---|---|
| 1921 | 321 | +1.3% |
| 1930 | 383 | +19.3% |
| 1950 | 296 | −22.7% |
| 1961 | 302 | +2.0% |
| 1970 | 263 | −12.9% |

| Year | Pop. | ±% |
|---|---|---|
| 1980 | 219 | −16.7% |
| 1991 | 219 | +0.0% |
| 2001 | 219 | +0.0% |
| 2011 | 382 | +74.4% |
| 2021 | 1,202 | +214.7% |

Source: Censuses

== Transport ==
The I/9 road (which connects the D8 motorway with Česká Lípa and the Czech–German border) runs along the western municipal border.

Zlonín is located on the railway lines Prague–Mělník and Prague–Mladá Boleslav.

== Sights ==
There are no protected cultural monuments in the municipality.
