= Vrutice =

- Municipality
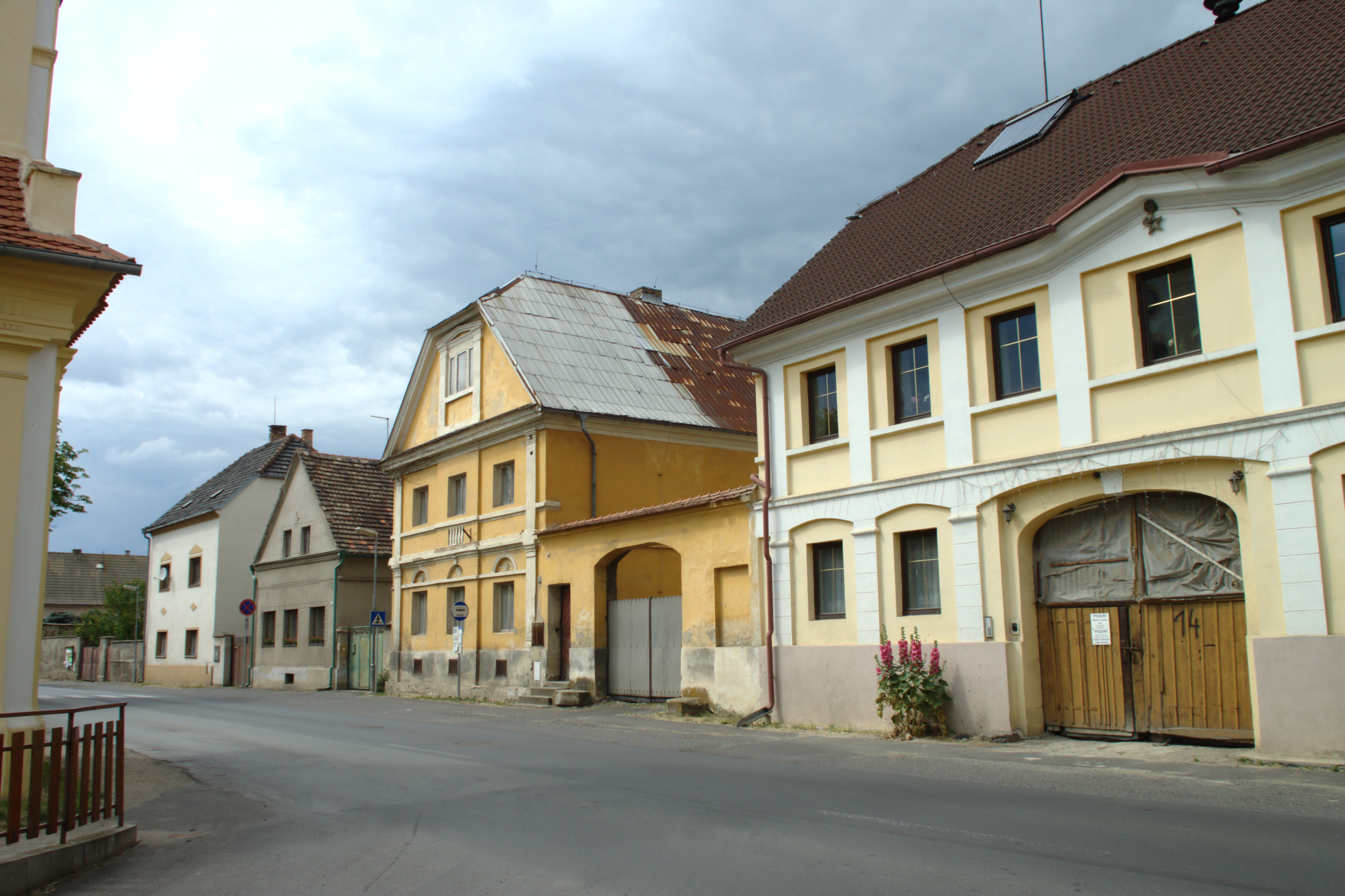
- Main street

- Flag Coat of arms

- Location in the Czech Republic
- Coordinates: 50°30′8″N 14°17′23″E
- Country: Czech Republic
- Region: Ústí nad Labem
- District: Litoměřice
- First mentioned: 1088

Area
  - Total: 7.01 km^{2} (2.71 sq mi)
- Elevation: 166 m (545 ft)

Population (2026-01-01)
  - Total: 321
  - Density: 45.8/km^{2} (119/sq mi)
- Time zone: UTC+1 (CET)
  - Summer (DST): UTC+2 (CEST)
- Postal codes: 411 47, 413 01
- Website: www.vrutice.cz

Vrutice is a municipality and village in Litoměřice District in the Ústí nad Labem Region of the Czech Republic. It has about 300 inhabitants.

Vrutice lies approximately 13 kilometres (8 mi) east of Litoměřice, 25 km (16 mi) south-east of Ústí nad Labem, and 48 km (30 mi) north of Prague.

== Administrative division ==
Vrutice consists of two municipal parts (in brackets population according to the 2021 census):

- Vrutice (220)
- Svařenice (98)

== History ==
The first written mention of Vrutice is from 1088, when it was owned by the Vyšehrad Chapter.

== Demographics ==
Historical population
Year	Pop.	±%
1869	525	—
1880	616	+17.3%
1890	618	+0.3%
1900	573	−7.3%
1910	546	−4.7%
1921	577	+5.7%
1930	605	+4.9%
1950	372	−38.5%
1961	399	+7.3%
1970	380	−4.8%
1980	332	−12.6%
1991	260	−21.7%
2001	252	−3.1%
2011	301	+19.4%
2021	318	+5.6%
Source: Censuses
