= Statue of Přemysl Otakar II =

The statue of Přemysl Otakar II is a bust dedicated to Přemysl Otakar II of Bohemia.

== Description ==
The statue of Přemysl Otakar II is situated in Vysoké Mýto. Vysoké Mýto is a small town in the region of Pardubice. This statue is the only one in the Czech Republic. The author of the statue is Karel Bureš, a native of Vysoké Mýto. The statue is 6 metres tall. The statue itself is 2 and half metres and the rest is a pedestal. It is called the Founder of the Town. The statue is from iron. The model of this statue was done in 2010 and people should have decided where the statue should be located. The project started with the help of a civic association. It was financed by public collection. Contributions were made by some well-known people, for example, the former minister of transport Vít Bárta or president of the Czech Republic Václav Klaus. (Andrle, Klíma 4.12.2012)

Přemysl Otakar II

Přemysl Otakar II (1233 – 26. 8. 1278) is well known as an iron and golden king. The king ruled from 1253 to 1278. Přemysl was very rich and famous thanks for his wealth and power. He wanted the crown of the Holy Roman Empire but he was unsuccessful. He is a founder of many Czech cities called royal dowry towns. One of them is Vysoké Mýto. Přemysl Otakar II died in 1278 in the battle in the Moravian field. (Čornej, Lockerová, Major 1992: 26-27)

Unveiling ceremony of the statue

Many famous people participated in the unveiling ceremony, for example, the president of the Czech Republic, Vít Bárta, Miloš Zeman and mayors of other royal dowry towns. Apart from the respected guests, thousands of local inhabitants were present. The statue was erected on 8 September 2012, during the 750 years' anniversary of the establishment of the city.
