= Zbraslav Chronicle =

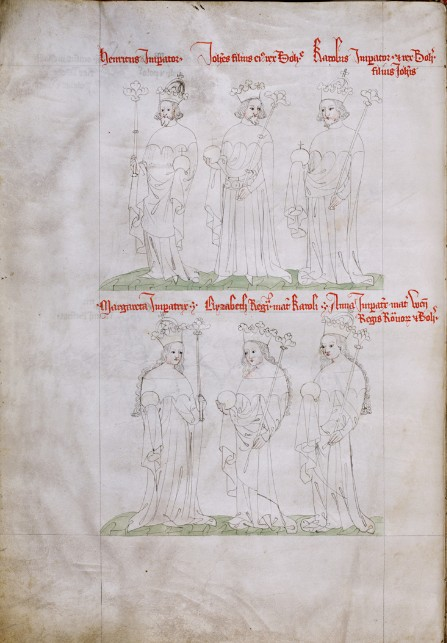
Luxembourg dynasty depicted in a manuscript of the chronicle from the 14th century

Zbraslav Chronicle (also Chronicle of Zbraslav or Chronicon Aulae Regiae) is the work of two abbots of the Cistercian monastery of Zbraslav (Aula Regia), Otto of Thuringia and Peter of Zittau. It was written in Latin in 1305–1338. It encompasses the rule of five Bohemian kings, Ottokar II, Wenceslaus II, Wenceslaus III, Henry of Bohemia and John of Bohemia. Only few manuscripts of the original chronicle exist to this day, with the most prominent being the Jihlava manuscript.

== Authors ==
The initiator of the chronicle was Otto of Thuringia. Little is known about his personal life, save what is stated in the chronicle itself. He was presumably born in Thuringia, then a German-speaking part of the Holy Roman Empire. He likely belonged to the original group of Cistercian monks from Sedlec Abbey that founded Zbraslav Abbey at the behest of King Wenceslaus II of Bohemia, and that he was 1297 elected to be its second abbot (although he resigned on his post mere two and a half years after his election). The first 51 chapters of the chronicle were written by him, but his death in 1316 prevented him from completing the work.

Peter of Zittau was, as well as his predecessor Otto, of German origin, as he was born in the city of Zittau (then a part of Bohemian Upper Lusatia, now a part of German Saxony). He wrote all of the remaining chapters of the chronicle and is regarded as one of the most relevant chroniclers in Czech history altogether. He witnessed many of the events he later described, such as the crowning of young Wenceslaus II in 1297, his burial in 1305, and perhaps most importantly the negotiations between the Holy Roman Emperor Henry VII and the current abbot of Zbraslav monastery Conrad, which resulted in the replacement of King Henry of Bohemia with young John from the House of Luxembourg, which ruled the kingdom for the century to come.

Peter was a learned scholar and a diplomat. He often assisted Elizabeth, the future queen and a member of the Premyslid dynasty, and took part in negotiating her betrothal to John of Bohemia. He later attended their wedding in Speyer, which the chronicle describes. After being elected abbot in 1316, he gained knowledge of Czech and European politics, and the chronicle is a source for the 13th and 14th centuries.

Many chapters reflect his personal and often emotional involvement in the described matter (be it the glorification of Queen Elizabeth, despite her lackluster claim to the Bohemian throne, or demonification of King Henry of Bohemia, whose rule was disadvantageous to the clergy), and events he likely deemed important are accompanied by moralising or emotionally touching poetry from Peters own pen.

== Content ==
The chronicle is divided into three books, with the first one being the longest.

=== Book one ===
The first 51 chapters of the first book come from the pen of Abbot Otto. His intention was the creation of a historia fundationum, a work depicting the legendary founding of the monastery, as writing such books was customary among Benedictine and Cistercian monasteries. Therefore, it lacks the annalic character of the second and third books, and focuses mainly on the creation of a legend, surrounding the founder of the monastery, Wenceslaus II.

The tragic end of the rule of King Ottokar II is laid forth. The consequent captivity of King Wenceslaus II in Brandenburg is depicted in an almost hagiographic character, with the hardships he had to endure there resembling martyrdom (it is likely, however, to be a construct made by Abbot Otto, created to elevate the abbey's founder Wenceslaus II upon a higher spiritual level, as no other contemporary source depicts Wenceslaus's captivity to be this cruel). Chronicler Otto´s work also offers an insight into Wenceslaus's troubled mind and tries to depict Wenceslaus's spiritual life, too.

Later, Wenceslaus's return to Bohemia and his entire rule and death are depicted. This, however, had to be finished by Peter, as Abbot Otto died before finishing his work. Peter then depicts the king's life and state of the Bohemian kingdom until 1305, when King Wenceslaus II died and was succeeded by his only son, Wenceslaus III. Following the murder of Wenceslaus III in 1306, we are acquainted with the turbulent era of dynastic interregnum, when the kingdom is ruled by Wenceslaus's appointed steward, now ruling king, Henry of Bohemia, and his wife, Anne, elder daughter of King Wenceslas II.

As was written already, Peter was displeased with Henry and his rule, and the chronicle reflects his opinion accordingly. The first book ends with the dethroning of Henry of Bohemia and with the early rule of his successor, John of Bohemia and his wife, Elizabeth of Bohemia with the year 1316.

=== Book two ===
The second book takes on a more annalistic character, as the necessity for a founding legend fades following the completion of the first book and the death of Wenceslaus II. While the second book appears less structured (adhering to the chronological flow of events rather than presenting thematically aligned chapters) it adopts a broader, more worldly perspective. This shift is evident as we follow the escapades of King John, predominantly outside Bohemia, and gain insight into the ongoing struggle for the imperial throne between Frederick the Fair of Austria and Louis of Bavaria, of papal intervention in the clash, of the papal schism and of the foreign policy of King John. The second book has 34 chapters and ends in 1333, with the death of Władysław I Łokietek of Poland.

=== Book three ===
The third book follows the annalic structure of the second book. It is, however, rather short, as it comprises merely 14 chapters, and ends in the year 1337, one year before the death of Peter Zittauer. We are given further information on the topic of papal schism. A part of the crusade launched upon Lithuania is also described, with both King John and his son Charles taking part. The book ends with a final expression of dissatisfaction of Peter Zittauer with the high taxes King John imposed upon the clergy and cities.

== Editions and translations ==
Due to its independence and thematic uniqueness (since few other texts depict the chosen era of Bohemian history in such detail without relying on the Chronicon as a source), the chronicle became a significant source of knowledge even among its contemporaries. Notably, chroniclers such as Francis of Prague referenced it as early as 1337, even before the passing of Peter of Zittau.

The second book of the chronicle was independently published in 1602 by an imperial publisher Marquard Freher. The chronicle in its entirety was then published in 1784 by Gelasius Dobner in the fifth volume of his Monumenta historica Bohemiae and in 1875 by Johann Loserth in the eight volume of his Fontes rerum Austriacarum. The last publication of the Latin original is a part of Joseph Emler´s Fontes rerum Bohemicarum, volume IV.

Since then, Zbraslav Chronicle has been translated and published several times, mostly in the Czech language, as in 1902 by J. V. Novák or in 1952 by Zdeněk Fiala. In 2014, a German translation by Stefan Albrecht was also published. However, the absence of an English translation restricts the chronicle's accessibility and broader scholarly engagement.

== Literature ==
- Fiala, Zdeněk (ed.); Mertlík, Rudolf a Heřmanský, František (transl.). Zbraslavská kronika: Chronicon Aulae Regiae (in Czech). Prague: Svoboda, 1975.
- Nechutová, Jana. Latinská literatura českého středověku: do roku 1400. Prague: Vyšehrad, 2000. 365 pp. ISBN 80-7021-305-1.
- Mediaevalia Historica Bohemica, roč. 2017, č. 20/1. ISSN 0862-979X. Dostupné z: https://www.hiu.cas.cz/user_uploads/vydavatelska_cinnost/periodika/mediaevalia_historica_bohemica/mhb_20_1_2017_fin.pdf
- Pumprová, Anna; Jan, Libor, eds. (2022). Cronica Aule regie. Die Königsaaler Chronik (in Latin and German) (Monumenta Germaniae historica. Scriptores XL ed.). Wiesbaden: Harrassowitz Verlag. ISBN 9783447107556.
