= Zbraslav =

- Municipal District of Prague; Cadastral Area of Prague
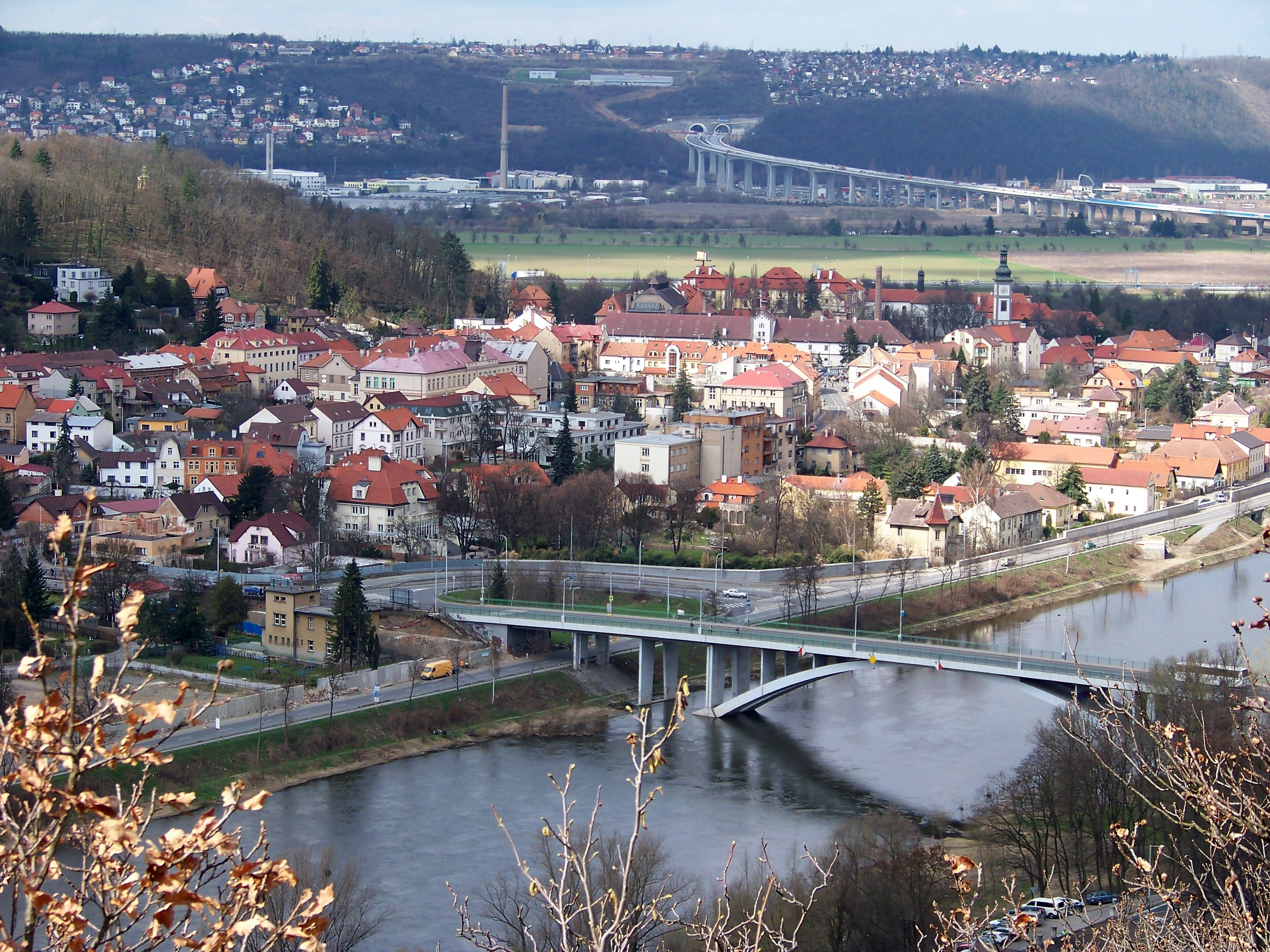
- Zbraslav from the right bank of the Vltava

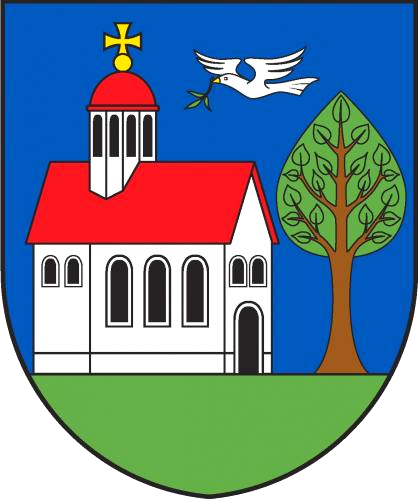
- Flag Coat of arms

- Location within Prague
- Coordinates: 49°58′30″N 14°23′16″E
- Country: Czech Republic
- Region: Prague, the Capital City

Area
  - Total: 9.85 km^{2} (3.80 sq mi)

Population (2021)
  - Total: 10,140
  - Density: 1,030/km^{2} (2,670/sq mi)
- Time zone: UTC+1 (CET)
  - Summer (DST): UTC+2 (CEST)
- Postal code: 156 00
- Website: http://www.mc-zbraslav.cz

Zbraslav (Czech pronunciation: [ˈzbraslaf]; German: Königsaal; Latin Aula Regia) is a municipal district and cadastral area of Prague. The southernmost district of Prague, it lies on the Vltava River in the national administrative district of Prague 16.

The former independent municipality of Zbraslav is now one of two cadastral areas in the Prague-Zbraslav Municipal District. The other is Lahovice.

== History ==
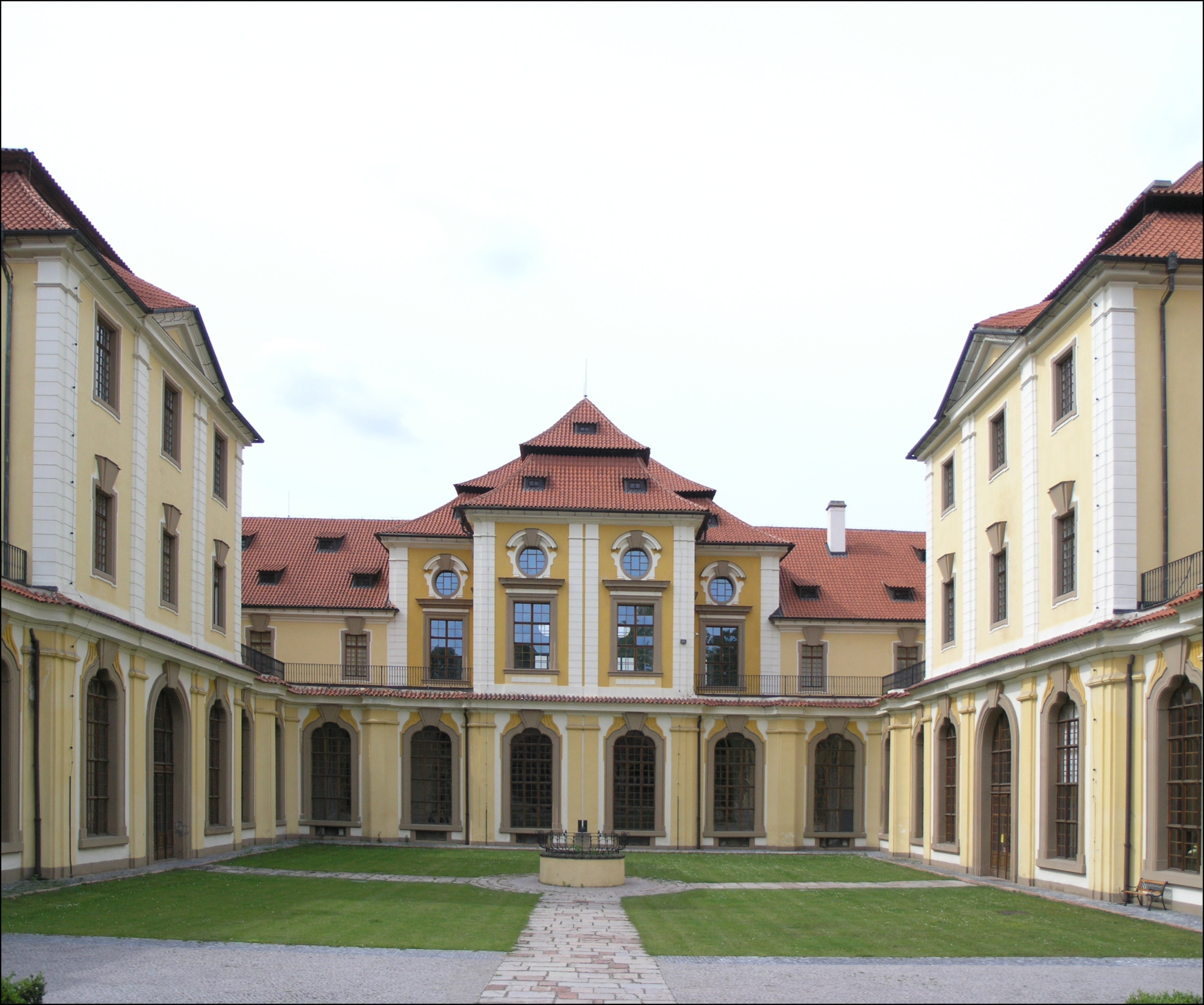
Zbraslav Château

Zbraslav was founded in 1118. In the 13th century, the king Wenceslaus II of Bohemia founded here a very influential Cistercian abbey which was called Aula regia in Latin. The medieval monastery became the burial place of Bohemian kings. The Madonna of Zbraslav (a masterpiece of Bohemian Gothic fine art) was painted for this monastery in the 1340s.

In 1935, V. Bulgakov founded an important Russian museum here with collections dedicated to Russian emigrants, but the museum was closed and confiscated by the Communists before 1948.

In 1924, Žabovřesky and Záběhlice were joined to Zbraslav. In 1967, Zbraslav was promoted to a town. Zbraslav was merged into the city of Prague in 1974. It used to house the Chinese and Japanese collections of the National Gallery in Prague in the building of former monastery.

== Demographics ==
Historical population
Year	Pop.	±%
1869	2,925	—
1880	2,868	−1.9%
1890	3,195	+11.4%
1900	3,286	+2.8%
1910	3,604	+9.7%
1921	3,727	+3.4%
1930	4,887	+31.1%
1950	5,534	+13.2%
1961	6,006	+8.5%
1970	6,226	+3.7%
1980	7,181	+15.3%
1991	7,530	+4.9%
2001	7,838	+4.1%
2011	9,995	+27.5%
2021	10,140	+1.5%
Source: Censuses

== Notable people ==
- Petr Žitavský (1270–1339), abbot of the Zbraslav Monastery, politician and author of the Zbraslav Chronicle
- Vladislav Vančura (1891–1942), novelist; lived here from 1921
- Jaromír Vejvoda (1902–1988), songwriter; his home is now a restaurant called Škoda Lásky with paraphernalia relating to him
