= Czech Hydrometeorological Institute =

Central state office in the Czech Republic

- Český hydrometeorologický ústav ČHMÚ
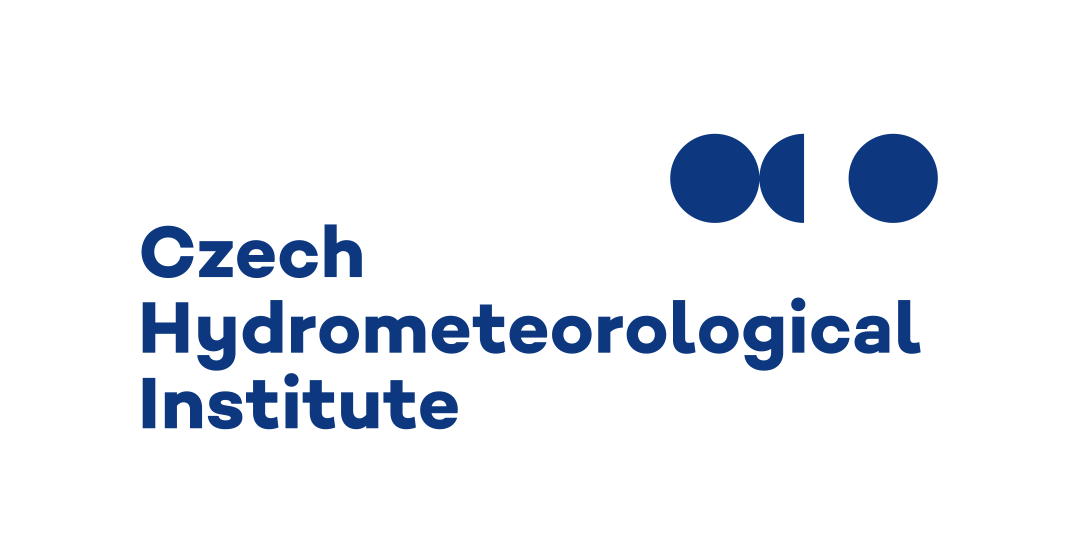

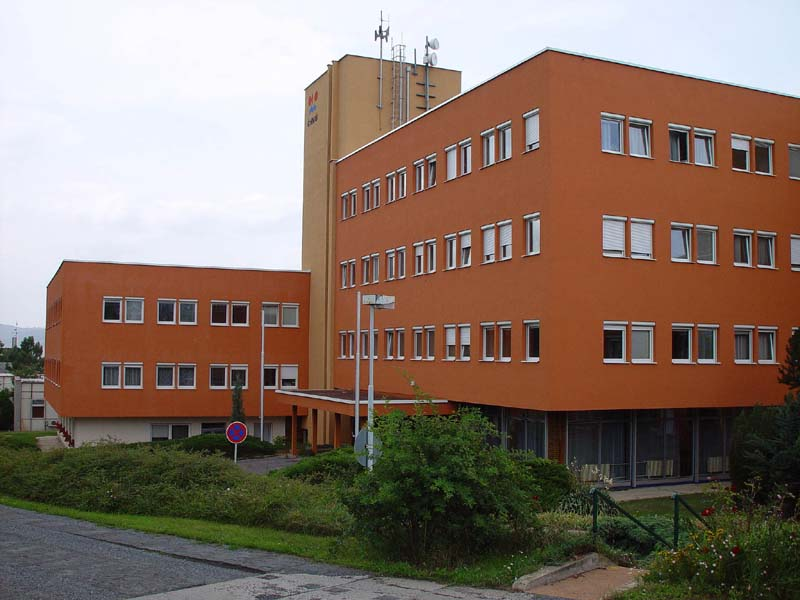
- Headquarters

Agency overview
- Formed: 1 January 1954
- Jurisdiction: Czech Republic
- Headquarters: Prague-Komořany
- Parent agency: Ministry of the Environment
- Website: www.chmi.cz

The Czech Hydrometeorological Institute (CHMI; Czech: Český hydrometeorologický ústav (ČHMÚ)) is the central state office of the Czech Republic in the fields of air quality, meteorology, climatology and hydrology. It is an organization established by the Ministry of the Environment of the Czech Republic. The head office and centralized workplaces of the CHMI, including the data processing, telecommunication and technical services, are located at the Institute's own campus in Prague.

== History ==
The National Meteorological Institute was established in 1919 shortly after Czechoslovakia was established at the end of World War I. On 1 January 1954, the National Meteorological Institute was united with the hydrology service and the Czech Hydrometeorological Institute was established. Its charter was amended in 1994 and in 1995 by the Ministry of the Environment of the Czech Republic.

== Structure ==
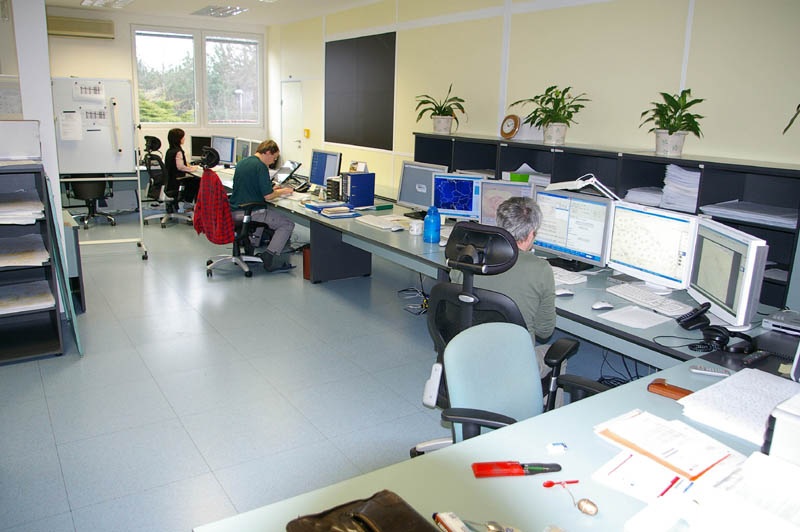
Meteorologists at the CHMI

The CHMI is made up of three specialized sections (meteorology and climatology section, hydrology section, and air quality section) with two support sections (finance and administration and Information technology (IT) section), and finally, the director section.

In addition to the central office in Prague-Komořany, the CHMI has a regional offices (branches) in six other Czech cities, not all sections are represented in each branch. Those other offices are in Brno, Ostrava, Plzeň, Ústí nad Labem, Hradec Králové, and České Budějovice.

=== Air pollution dispersion modelling activities ===
The Air Quality division has seven departments:

- Air Quality Information System
- Emission and Sources
- Modelling and Expertise Pool
- National Inventorization System
- Air Quality Monitoring
- Central Air Quality Laboratory
- Calibration Laboratory

The work of the Modelling and Expertise Pool department is focused upon: the development of air pollution dispersion models; the application of such models in the preparation of expert reports and opinions; forecasts of air quality control; the processing of operating information on pollutant concentrations obtained by the Airborne Monitoring section.

The SYMOS97 air pollution dispersion model was developed at the CHMI. It models the dispersion of continuous, neutral or buoyant plumes from single or multiple point, area or line sources. It can handle complex terrain and it can also be used to simulate the dispersion of cooling tower plumes.

== See also ==
- List of atmospheric dispersion models
- FMI, the Finnish Meteorological Institute
- KNMI, the Royal Dutch Meteorological Institute
- NILU, the Norwegian Institute for Air Research
- Swedish Meteorological and Hydrological Institute
- Royal Meteorological Society
