= Madonna of Zbraslav =

14th-century painting

- Zbraslavská madona (Czech)
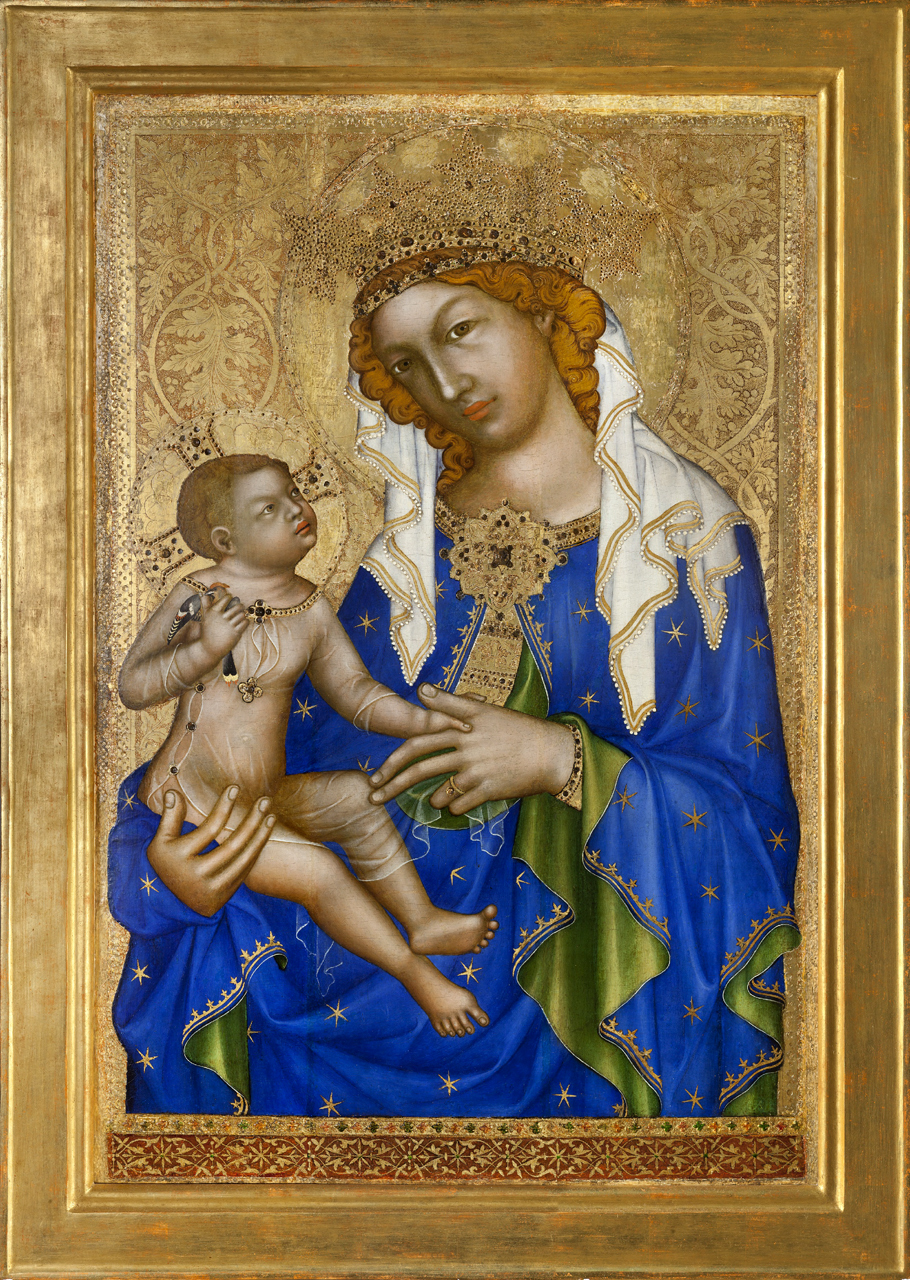
- Artist: Unknown
- Year: c. 1345
- Type: Tempera, beech-wood on both sides covered with canvas
- Dimensions: 89 cm × 60.5 cm (35 in × 23.8 in)
- Location: National Gallery in Prague
- Owner: Roman-Catholic deanery in Zbraslav

The Zbraslav Madonna (c. 1345) comes from the parish church of St James the Greater in Zbraslav. It is on long-term loan at the permanent exhibition of the National Gallery in Prague.

== History of the painting ==
The Cistercian abbey in Zbraslav near Prague was founded by king Wenceslaus II in imitation of the royal necropolis of Saint Denis near Paris. Elisabeth of Bohemia, mother of Emperor Charles IV was also buried in the monastery. Although the origin of this picture is not known and its existence is not recorded in any written documents, comparative analyses have shown that it dates from the period between 1340 and 1360. The early character of the engraved drawing and the pentiments that have been revealed prove that it isn’t a later copy. The story that the picture was dedicated to the monastery by its founder Wenceslaus II (1278–1305) dates from the late 18th century. In the past, there was an excerpt of poetry on the rear side of panel, glorifying the Virgin Mary that was misinterpreted by preceding generations of historians. In 1420 the monastery was burned down by the Hussites and the picture was reputedly found two hundred years later in the rubble, restored and exhibited in a newly built church in 1654. Its current state follows restoration in 1945, and in the 1990s old areas of retouching and overpainting were removed.

== Description and context ==
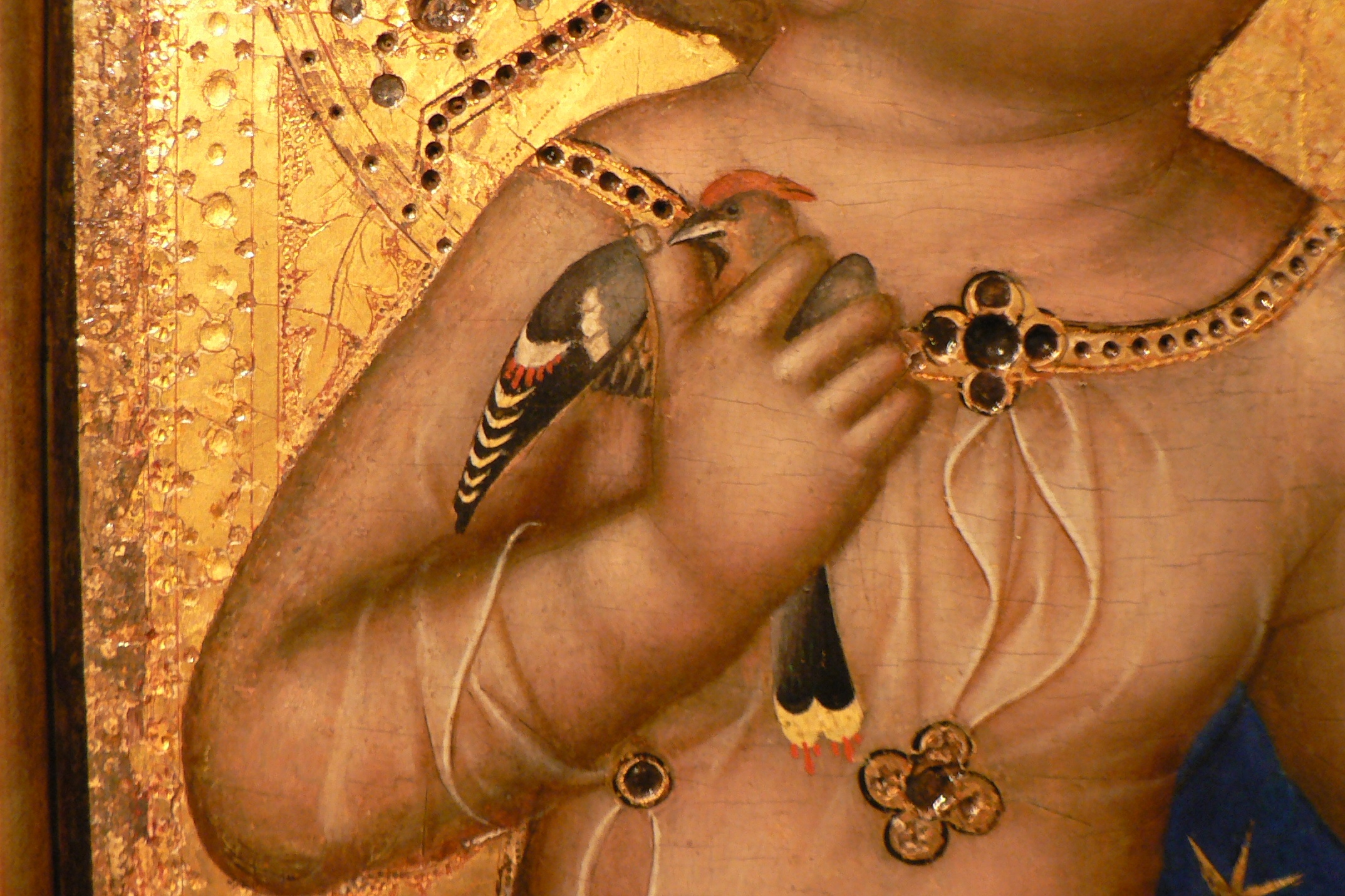
Infant Jesus holding a Bohemian waxwing

The picture is painted in tempera on a chalk base with an engraved drawing outlined in black. It is on a lime-wood panel and measures 89 x 59.5 cm. Compared with older Italian-Byzantine models, the drawing is suppressed and the painter models volume using the technique of thin, glazed paint layers of colour gradation in the incarnates. The Madonna has a gold-embroidered white cloak and a blue cloak with green lining decorated with gold stars. The Madonna's cloak and white veil and the transparent shirt of the child are decorated along their hems with gold embroidery. The crown is decorated with curly leaves. The stones and pearls on the crown, halos, hems and clasp were mounted later on, while the background was also subsequently gilded over. The ring on the Madonna’s finger refers to the mystic betrothal of Christ and Mary that symbolises the Christian Church. This allegorical identification of Mary with the Church is characteristic of the Cistercian context and stems from the preaching of St Bernard of Clairvaux.

In its composition, the picture has much in common with the Madonna of Veveří type and the later Madonna of Rome. At the same time, however, it also repeats several motifs from earlier Marian pictures. Its colour palette recalls the painting of Tomasso da Modena. The motif of the Infant Jesus holding a goldfinch or waxwing (here) was widespread through Italy from the early 14th century and appears in the Rajhrad Breviary of Queen Elizabeth Richeza of Poland. In contrast to the older Italian-Byzantine type of Madonna, the Hodegetria in which the mother presents the child as an object of worship, in this composition there is a tangible shift to a more human and intimate relationship between the mother and child that corresponds more to the ideas of believers around the mid-14th century.

The Zbraslav Madonna was one of the most celebrated Marian pictures in Bohemia. It was originally intended for the church of the Cistercian monastery, where Bohemian kings from the Přemyslid dynasty were buried. Some people believe that Charles IV himself commissioned the picture. The Zbraslav Madonna was greatly revered and there exist many copies of it, dating mainly from the Baroque period. The Zbraslav Madonna was consecrated as the 43rd chapel of the Holy Route from Prague to Mladá Boleslav that was established by the Jesuits between 1674 and 1690.

== Bibliography ==
- Jiří Fajt, Štěpánka Chlumská, Čechy a střední Evropa 1220-1550, Národní galerie v Praze 2014, ISBN 978-80-7035-569-5, pp. 24–28.
- Jiří Fajt, Jan Royt: České gotické umění, Karolinum Press, Praha 2002.
- Jan Royt, Medieval Painting in Bohemia, Karolinum Press, Praha 2003 ISBN 8024602660.
- Jaroslav Pešina: Česká gotická malba, Odeon, Praha 1972.
- Antonín Matějček, Jaroslav Pešina, Česká malba gotická, Melantrich, Praha 1950, pp. 58–61.
