= Peter of Zittau =

Peter of Zittau (Czech: Petr Žitavský; c. 1275–1339) was a Bohemian churchman and historian. Born in Zittau, he entered the Cistercian monastery of Aula Regia (Zbraslav), founded by Wenceslaus II in 1292, and became the monastery's official historian. He is the primary author of the Chronicon Aulae Regiae. Esteemed by his colleagues, in 1316 Peter was elected the second abbot of Aula Regia. In this capacity he took part in the election of King John and staunchly opposed Henry of Carinthia. He later grew disenchanted with John, but wrote a lengthy lament for the passing of his wife, Elizabeth, the "true heiress of Bohemia" (vera heres Boemiae), in 1330.

== Sources ==
- Bjork, Robert E., ed. (2010). "Peter of Zittau (c.1275–1339)". The Oxford Dictionary of the Middle Ages. Oxford: Oxford University Press.
- Honemann, Volker (2001). "Peter (Petrus) von Zittau". Neue Deutsche Biographie. Vol. 20. Berlin: Duncker & Humblot. pp. 232–33.
- Innocenti, Marco (2002). "Peter von Zittau". Biographisch-Bibliographisches Kirchenlexikon. Vol. 20. Nordhausen: Traugott Bautz. pp. 1168–74.
- Loserth, Johann (1887). "Peter von Zittau". Allgemeine Deutsche Biographie. Vol. 25. Leipzig: Duncker & Humblot. pp. 476–78.
- Péporté, Pit (2011). Constructing the Middle Ages: Historiography, Collective Memory and Nation-Building in Luxembourg. Leiden: Brill.
