= Vyšehrad Chapter =

Coordinates: 50°03′52″N 14°25′05″E

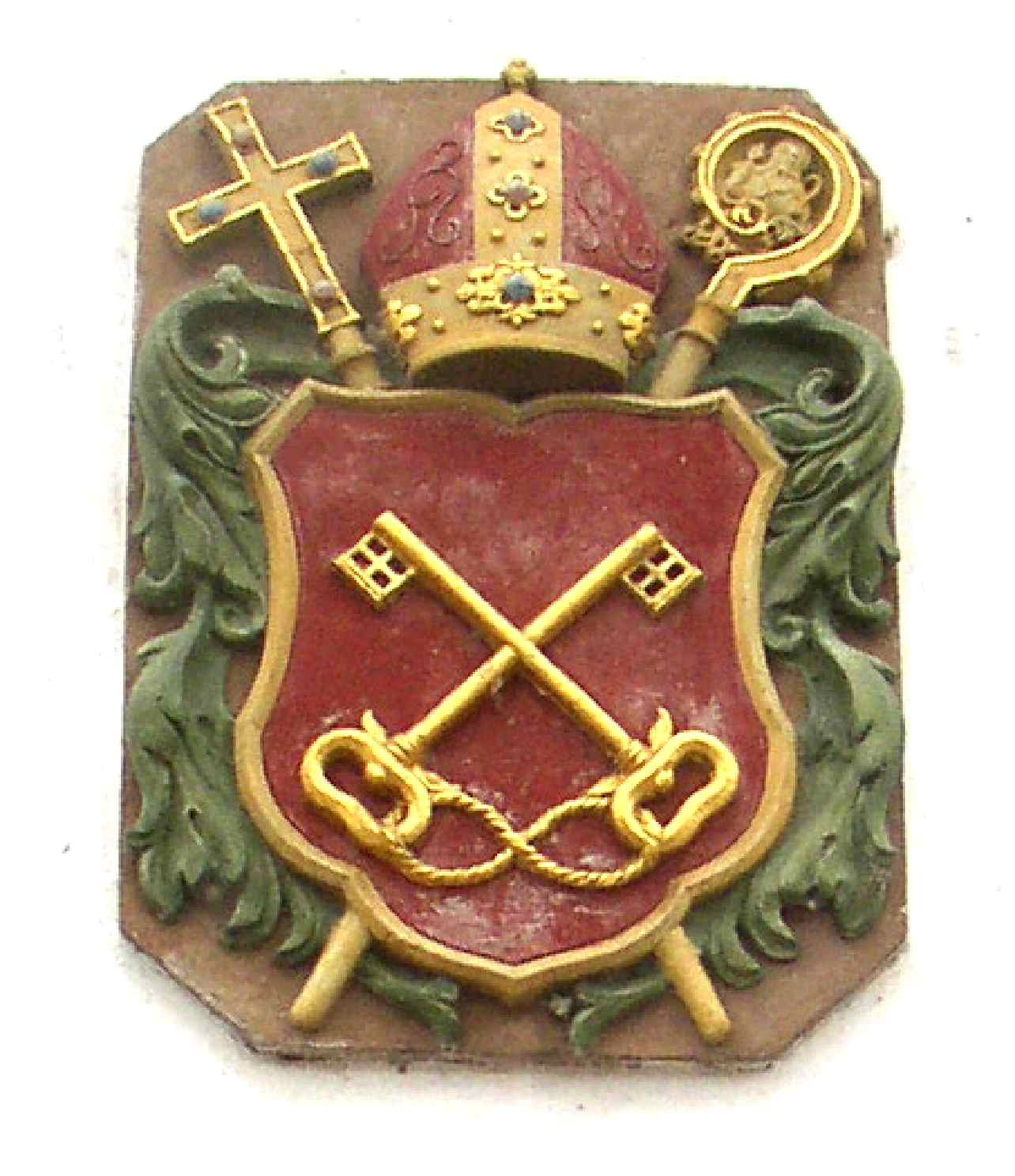
The coat of arms of the Vyšehrad Chapter

The Vyšehrad Chapter (Czech: Vyšehradská kapitula), officially the Royal Collegiate Chapter of Ss. Peter and Paul at Vyšehrad (Czech: Královská kolegiátní kapitula sv. Petra a Pavla na Vyšehradě), is a collegiate chapter established at the church dedicated to Saints Peter and Paul in Vyšehrad (now in Prague) around 1070 by Vratislaus II, the first king of Bohemia.

== Sources ==
- Sommer, Petr; Třeštík, Dušan; Žemlička, Josef; Opačić, Zoë (2007). "Bohemia and Moravia". In Berend, Nora (ed.). Christianization and the Rise of Christian Monarchy: Scandinavia, Central Europe and Rus', c.900-1200. Cambridge University Press. pp. 214–262. ISBN 978-0-521-87616-2.
- Wolverton, Lisa (2001). Hastening Toward Prague: Power and Society in the Medieval Czech Lands. University of Pennsylvania Press. ISBN 0-8122-3613-0.
