= Conrad I of Sanneck =

Conrad of Sanneck
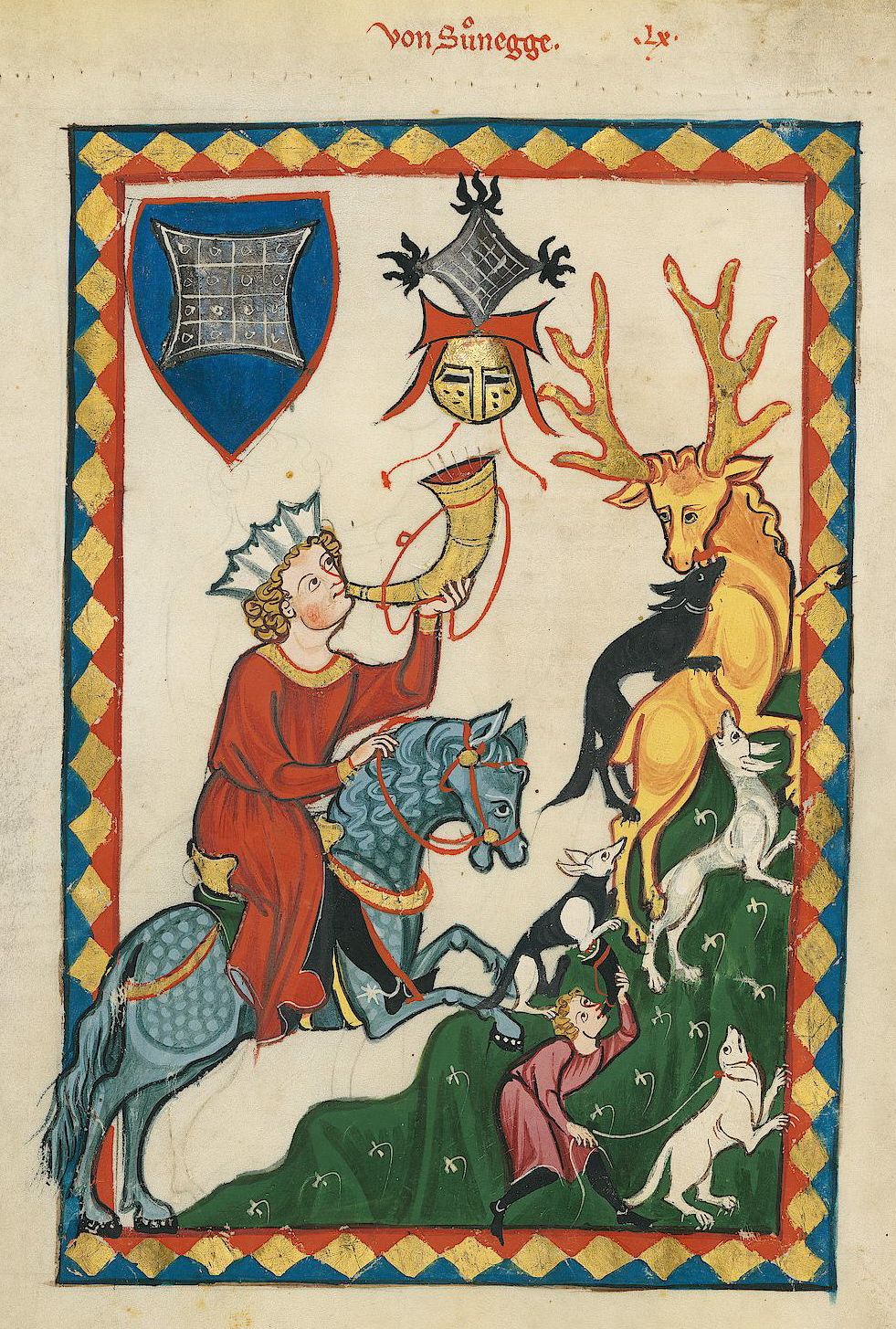
- "The One from Sanneck" (der von Sounegge) from Codex Manesse is generally considered as a depiction of Conrad I.

Lord of Žovnek
- Reign: around 1220 - 1255
- Predecessor: Gebhard II of Sanneck
- Successor: Liutpold III of Sanneck
- Born: Žovnek Castle
- Noble family: House of Sanneck
- Issue: Liutpold III; Conrad II; Gebhard III; Ulrich of Sanneck
- Father: Gebhard II of Sanneck

Conrad I of Sanneck (German: Conrad von Sanneck, Slovene: Konrad Žovneški; ? – before 1255), Lord of Žovnek (Sanneck, in German), was a free noble in the March of Savinja in the Holy Roman Empire, in what is now Slovenia. He was an ancestor of the House of Celje, founded by his grandson Frederick.

He was born to the free noble (roughly equivalent to a baron) Gebhard II of Sanneck. Little is known of his youth. He flourished between 1220 and 1241, when his name is present in various sources, showing that he was the owner of large allods in the Savinja Valley, then part of the March of Carniola. In 1237, the Patriarch of Aquileia Berthold of Andechs-Merania invested him with several fiefs in Carniola and in the Windic March. Sources show that Conrad had a relatively large number of vassals, among whom the Auersperg family.

It was Conrad who first used the traditional coat-of-arms of the House of Sanneck, two red stripes on a silver shield.

Conrad was mentioned by the minnesanger Ulrich von Liechtenstein in his Frauendienst as a participant of the tournament in Friesach in Carinthia. Conrad very likely wrote poetry himself, being considered the same person as "the Knight from Sanneck" mentioned in the famous Liederhandschrift (book of poetry), known as the Codex Manesse.

== Family ==
Conrad married the noblewoman Sophie of Pfannberg-Peggau. They had six children:

- Conrad II of Sanneck
- Liutpold III of Sanneck
- Gebhard III of Sanneck
- Ulrich of Sanneck, who eventually became his father's sole heir
- Sophia
- Gertrud

== Family tree ==
Herman VI, Margrave of Baden	Gertrude of Austria
Conrad I of Sanneck ∞ Sophie of Pfannberg-Peggau	2.Ulrich II, Count of Heunburg	Agnes of Baden	1.Ulrich III, Duke of Carinthia
Ulrich of Sanneck	Catherine of Heunburg	Margaret of Heunburg	Ulrich IV, Count of Pfannberg
Wladislaw I of Poland	Frederick I of Celje ∞ Diemut of Wallsee	Stephen II, Ban of Bosnia	Ulrich V of Pfannberg
Casimir III of Poland	Ulrich I of Celje ∞ Adelaide of Ortenburg	Hermann I of Celje	Catherine of Bosnia	Elizabeth of Poland	Charles I of Hungary
Anna of Poland	William of Celje	Hermann II of Celje ∞ Anna of Schaunberg	Elizabeth of Bosnia	Louis of Hungary
Frederick II, Count of Celje ∞ Elizabeth of Frankopan	2.Barbara of Celje	Sigismund of Bohemia	1.Mary, Queen of Hungary
Ulrich II of Celje ∞ Katarina Branković
2.Anna of Cilli	Władysław II Jagiełło	1.Jadwiga of Poland
