= Frederick I, Count of Celje =

Styrian free noble (roughly equivalent to a baron)

Frederick I of Celje
- Frederick's coat of arms, combining the white-red stripes of the Free Lords of Sanneck and the three stars of the Counts of Heunburg (Vovbre)

Count of Celje
- Reign: April 1341 - 1359
- Predecessor: title established
- Successor: Hermann I
- Born: Žovnek Castle
- Noble family: House of Celje
- Spouse: Diemut of Wallsee
- Issue: Ulrich I Hermann I
- Father: Ulrich of Sanneck
- Mother: Catherine of Heunburg

Frederick I of Celje, also Frederick I of Cilli (German: Friedrich I. von Cilli, Slovene: Friderik I. Celjski; c. 1300 – 21 March 1359), was a Styrian free noble (roughly equivalent to a baron) who became the first Count of Celje, founding a noble house that would dominate Slovenian and Croatian history in the first half of the 15th century.

Born as Frederick, Lord of Žovnek (Sanneck) and baron of Savinja (Soune) in the Holy Roman Empire, he inherited vast estates in Carinthia, Carniola and Styria upon the extinction of the Counts of Heunburg. These included the Celje Castle, located at a strategic position in the center of the Savinja Valley, guarding a main transit route connecting Lower Styria with Carniola, as well as guarding the border with Hungary. The castle was fairly close to the ancestral seat of the Lords of Sanneck, and was thus made into their new residence. In 1341, Frederick was granted the title of Count of Celje (Cilli, in German) by Emperor Louis IV. The coat of arms of the House of Heunburg, three yellow stars on a blue background, were incorporated in the coat of arms of the Counts of Celje, and are now part of the Coat of Arms of Slovenia.

== Life and achievements ==
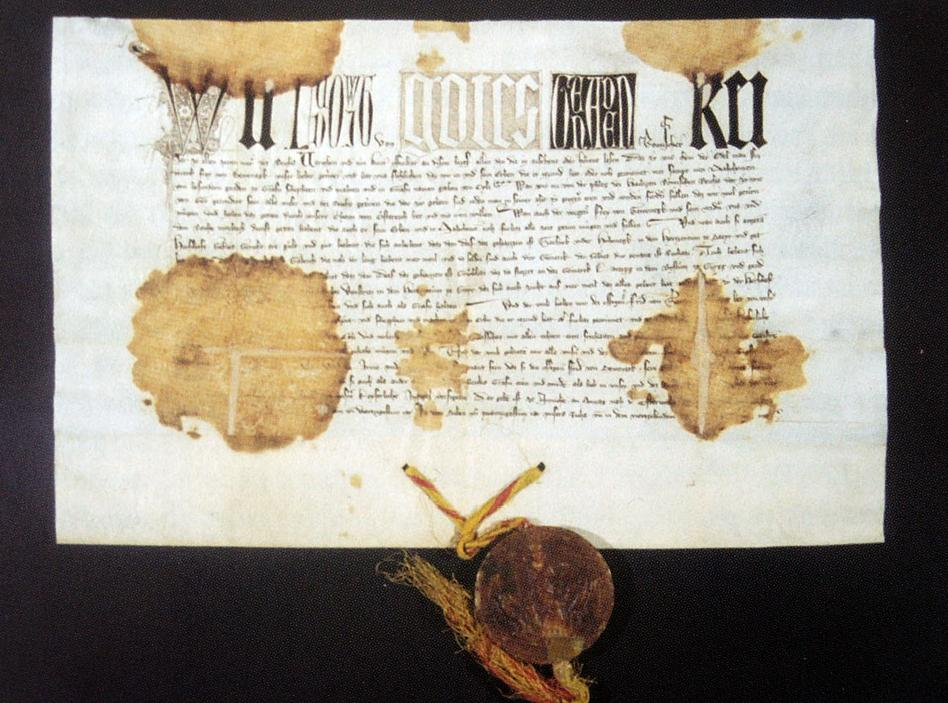
The document issued by Emperor Louis IV. of Bavaria in 1341, raising Frederick of Sanneck to the rank of Count of Celje (Cilli)

Frederick was the son of Ulrich of Sanneck, Lord of Žovnek. His father was a free noble in the March on the Savinja, a region fragmented among various small estates, which was contested between the House of Gorizia-Tyrol and the Habsburgs. Frederick's father took the side of the Habsburg dukes of Styria, becoming their vassal. His allegiance was instrumental in the incorporation of the Savinja Valley into the Duchy of Styria and thus into the Habsburg domains.

Frederick's mother was Catharine, the firstborn daughter of Ulrich II Count of Heunburg and of Agnes of Baden. Ulrich of Heunberg owned important estates in Carinthia, Carniola and Styria, while Agnes was the titular heiress of the House of Babenberg through her mother Gertrude of Austria.

Both of Frederick's parents died around 1315, and he became the head of the house. In 1322, the male line of the Counts of Heunburg became extinct, and Frederick inherited the estates from his maternal uncle Hermann. However, he had to contend the inheritance with his cousin Ulrich V. of Pfannberg, son of Count Hermann's younger sister Margaret. He also had to deal with the dowager countess Elizabeth, daughter of the powerful Albert II of Gorizia, who claimed part of her late husband's estates. After a protracted legal and military struggle, Frederick prevailed with the help of his brother-in-law Ulrich von Walsee, captain (governor) of Styria, who enjoyed the support of the reigning duke Otto the Merry. By 1333, Frederick was in possession of almost all of the Heunburg estates.

Frederick followed his father's policy of allegiance to the Habsburgs. In the early 1330s, he was named captain (governor) of Carniola and the Windic March, preparing the ground for a smooth transition of power from duke Henry of Bohemia, the last male member of the Gorizia-Tyrol dynasty, to the Habsburgs. When the Habsburgs did take over Carniola in 1335, Frederick was confirmed in his position. He successfully fought against the forces of Charles of Luxembourg who tried to seize Carinthia on behalf of his brother John Henry who was married to countess Margaret of Tyrol, the only surviving child of the late duke Henry of Carinthia. In this fight, many of Frederick's estates in Styria were devastated by the incursions of the Hungarian king Charles Robert, an ally of the Luxembourgs. As a reward for his loyalty, the Habsburgs gave their consent for Frederick's elevation to the status of count. In April 1341, he was granted the title of Count of Celje by the Holy Roman Emperor Louis IV in a ceremony in Munich.

Shortly before his death, he took part of a diplomatic mission on behalf of Albert II, Duke of Austria and the Hungarian king Louis the Great to the papal court in Avignon.

== Policy of expansion ==
Slovenian historian Milko Kos called Frederick "the first architect of the Celje glory", claiming that "he possessed all those abilities in statesmanship that would characterize his greatest successors".

By the time of his death, he was one of the most powerful feudal lords in the territory of present-day Slovenia, rivaled only by his Habsburg liege lords, the Albertine line of the Counts of Gorizia and the Counts of Ortenburg. Frederick pursued a strategy of alliance with the latter: his first born son Ulrich would marry Adelaide, daughter of Count Albert I of Ortenburg, while her brother and Albert's successor Otto VI married Frederick's daughter anna. The arrangement would prove very beneficious to the Counts of Celje, as they would inherit all Ortenburg possessions in Carinthia and Carniola after the death of Frederick's grandson and namesake Frederick III of Ortenburg in 1418.

Frederick's fiefs and allods covered almost the entire territory of the former March on the Savinja (now firmly part of the Duchy of Styria), safe for scattered ecclesiastical lands. In addition to that, he acquired vast areas in the wealthy Krka Valley and the Heunburg original territories around Heunburg (Vovbre, in Slovene) in southeastern Carinthia. In 1328, he purchased his first estate in Carniola, Smlednik, followed by Krško, Mirna and Trebnje in the Windic March, while Vipava was leased to him by the Habsburgs.

He was succeeded by his sons Ulrich and Hermann I.

== Marriage and children ==
Frederick married Diemut of Wallsee. Four of their children survived into adulthood:

- Ulrich, married countess Adelaide of Ortenburg, had issue;
- Hermann, married Catherine of Bosnia, had issue;
- Anna, married count Otto IV of Ortenburg, had issue;
- Catherine, married Albert III of Gorizia, no issue.

== Family tree ==
Hermann of Baden	Gertrude of Austria
Conrad I of Sanneck	2.Ulrich II, Count of Heunburg	Agnes of Baden	1.Ulrich III, Duke of Carinthia
Ulrich of Sanneck	Catherine of Heunburg	Margaret of Heunburg	Ulrich IV, Count of Pfannberg
Wladislaw I of Poland	Frederick I of Celje	Ulrich V of Pfannberg
Casimir III of Poland	Ulrich I of Celje	Hermann I of Celje	Catherine of Bosnia	Elizabeth of Poland ∞ Charles I of Hungary
Anna of Poland	William of Celje	Hermann II of Celje	Elizabeth of Bosnia	Louis of Hungary
Frederick II, Count of Celje	2.Barbara of Celje	Sigismund of Bohemia	1.Mary, Queen of Hungary
Ulrich II, Count of Celje
2.Anna of Cilli	Władysław II Jagiełło	1.Jadwiga of Poland
