= Ulrich I of Celje =

Styrian nobleman and condottiere

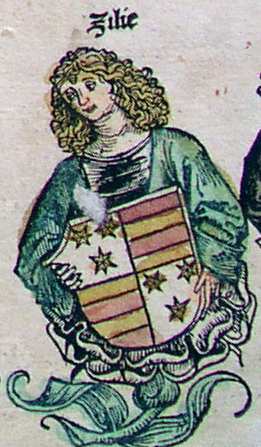
- Ulrich's coat of arms

Count of Celje
- Reign: 1359/60 – 1368
- Predecessor: Frederick I of Celje
- Successor: Hermann I of Celje and William of Celje
- Noble family: House of Celje
- Spouse: Adelaide of Ortenburg
- Issue: William of Celje
- Father: Frederick I
- Mother: Diemut of Walsee

Ulrich I (German: Ulrich von Cilli, Slovene: Ulrik Celjski; around 1331 – 1368), Count of Celje, was a Styrian nobleman and condottiere, who was head of the House of Celje between 1359 and 1368, together with his younger brother Hermann I. During his reign, the House of Celje became one of the most powerful noble houses in the territory of present-day Slovenia, and laid the basis for its expansion to neighboring Slavonia and Croatia in the next generation. Ulrich's skills as a military commander are usually credited for the House of Celje's acceptance into the circles of the Central European high nobility in the second half of the 14th century. His life was immortalized in the poem Von graff Ulrichen von Tzili (On the Count Ulrich of Cilli) by the 14th century Austrian poet Peter Suchenwirt.

== Life and achievements ==
Little is known of Ulrich's early life. He was the firstborn son of Frederick, first Count of Celje, and his wife Diemut Wallsee. Frederick had inherited the Celje Castle and the surrounding estates through his mother Catherine, daughter of the last Carinthian Count of Heunburg (Vovbre, in Slovene) and Agnes of Baden, the unsuccessful claimant to the Babenberg inheritance.

The Counts of Celje owed their success to the allegiance to the Habsburgs. Like his father before him, Ulrich served as the Landeshauptmann (governor) of the Habsburg Duchy of Carniola from 1362.

Ulrich served as a condottiere, a military contractor lending his services to more powerful lords. He began his military career as a teenager when he joined the expedition of Hungarian king Louis the Great against the Venetians in Dalmatia in 1346, participating in the unsuccessful siege of Zadar. In 1348, he fought in the service of Louis V, Duke of Bavaria in Tyrol and in Brandenburg.

Despite beginning his career fighting against John Henry of Moravia in Tyrol, Ulrich eventually established strong ties with the Luxembourg rulers of Bohemia and Germany: in 1354, he took part in the expedition of the Holy Emperor Charles IV to Italy. Likewise, he had strong ties to Louis the Great of Hungary, fightzing on his side against Venice in 1354–55, in the siege of Treviso. Between 1359 and 1365, he took part of his expeditions to Serbia, Bulgaria and Southern Italy. In 1362–63, he fought on the side of the Habsburg duke Rudolf IV in Friuli and in Tyrol; in reward for his service, he was pawned with Kamnik in Carniola, and Žalec and Vojnik in Styria: the latter two would remain in the possession of his descendendants until the House of Cilli would die out in 1456.

The connection with the Hungarian and Polish king Louis proved fruitful. Ulrich's younger brother Hermann married Catherine of Bosnia, king Louis's sister in law, while Ulrich's son William married Anna of Poland, the daughter of Casimir the Great, the last Piast king of Poland. These marriages elevated the Counts of Celje into the circles of Central European royalty. At the same time, the settlement was convenient for Louis the Great who succeeded Casimir as King of Poland: Casimir's daughter, who might have otherwise claimed the throne for her children, was married off to Louis's loyal junior ally far away from Poland, thus neutralizing a potential challenge to his legitimacy in a problematic succession.

== Marriage and issue ==
Ulrich married Adelaide of Ortenburg, daughter of the powerful Carinthian count of Ortenburg. The marriage strengthened the alliance between the two houses. Only one son, William, survived into adulthood from this union. He married Anna of Poland, and had one daughter, Anna of Celje, who would become Polish queen consort by her marriage to Vladislav II.

== Family tree ==
Ulrich of Sanneck ∞ Catherine of Heunburg
Wladislaw I of Poland	Frederick I of Celje ∞ Diemut of Walsee	Stephen II of Bosnia
Casimir III of Poland	Ulrich I, Count of Celje	Hermann I of Celje	Catherine of Bosnia	Elizabeth of Poland ∞ Charles I of Hungary
Anna of Poland, Countess of Celje	William of Celje	Hermann II of Celje ∞ Anna of Schaunberg	Elizabeth of Bosnia	Louis I of Hungary and Poland
Anna of Celje	Władysław II Jagiełło	Frederick II of Celje ∞ Elizabeth of Frankopan	2.Barbara of Celje	Sigismund, Holy Roman Emperor	1.Mary of Hungary	Jadwiga of Poland
Ulrich II, Count of Celje ∞ Katarina Branković
Elizabeth of Celje ∞ Matthias Corvinus

== Ancestry ==
Ancestors of Ulrich I of Celje

8. Conrad I of Sanneck
4. Ulrich of Sanneck
9. Sophie of Pfannberg-Peggau
2. Frederick I of Celje
10. Ulrich II of Heunburg
5. Catherine of Heunburg
11. Agnes of Baden
1. Ulrich I, Count of Celje
12. Eberhard III. of Walsee
6. Ulrich I. of Walsee-Graz
13. Adelaide of Waldburg
3. Diemut of Wallsee
14. Dietrich of Rohrau
7. Diemut of Rohrau
15. Diemut of Feldsburg
