= Frederick II, Count of Celje =

Croatian nobleman (1379–1454)

- Count of Celje, Zagorje and Ortenburg, Lord of the Slovene March; Prince of the Holy Roman Empire
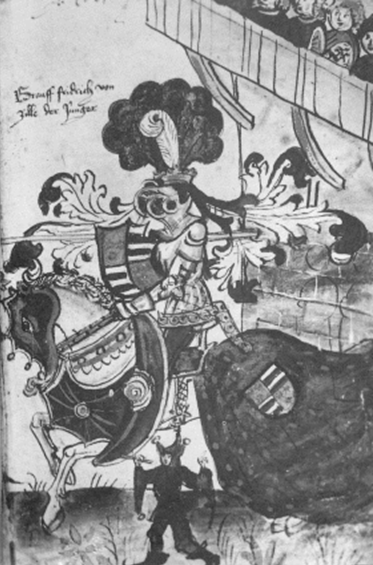
- Frederick II, Count of Celje

Ban of Slavonia
- Reign: 1445–1454
- Predecessor: Matko Talovac
- Successor: Ulrich II, Count of Celje
- Born: 17 January 1379
- Died: 13 June 1454 (aged 75); Žovnek Castle
- Noble family: House of Celje
- Spouses: Elizabeth of Frankopan; Veronika of Desenice
- Issue: Ulrich II, Count of Celje
- Father: Hermann II, Count of Celje
- Mother: Anna of Schaunberg

Frederick II (Slovene: Friderik II. Celjski; Croatian: Fridrik II. Celjski; German: Friedrich II Graf von Cilli) (17 January 1379 – 13 or 20 June 1454) was a Count of Celje and Ban of Croatia, Slavonia and Dalmatia.

== Early life ==
Born on 17 January 1379, Frederick was the son of Hermann II, Count of Celje, and Anna of Schaunberg.

== Marriages ==
Frederick II married Elizabeth of Frankopan and, after her death in 1422, Veronika of Desenice. The famous Eberhard Windbeck chronicle gives a detailed report on the circumstances of Elizabeth of Frankopan's death, which in the chronicle is described as murder and placed in the year 1424. He caused a stir when, in 1422, he allegedly murdered his first wife, Elisabeth of Frangepán, so that he could marry his lover, Veronika of Desenice. The Frangepáns brought charges against him to King Sigismund, who had him convicted and given him into custody by his father, who imprisoned him in Obercilli Castle and had Veronika strangled in Osterwitz Castle. His father also disowned him from his inheritance, but when his younger brother Hermann died suddenly in 1426, Frederick once again became the heir to the Cillei estate. He was soon pardoned, and at the end of 1426, his appointment as voivode of Transylvania was even discussed. From 1445, he held the title of Slavonian and from 1453 Croatian Ban.

== Ancestry ==
Ancestors of Frederick II, Count of Celje

8. Frederick I, Count of Celje
4. Hermann I of Celje
9. Diemut of Wallsee
2. Hermann II, Count of Celje
10. Stephen II, Ban of Bosnia
5. Catherine of Bosnia, Countess of Cilli
11. Elizabeth of Kuyavia
1. Frederick II, Count of Celje
12. Henry V, Count of Schaunberg
6. Henry VII, Count of Schaunberg
13. Anna of Truhendingen
3. Anna of Schaunberg
14. Meinhard VI, Count of Gorizia
7. Ursula of Schoeneck
15. Catherine of Pfannberg

=== Family tree ===
Ulrich of Sanneck	Catherine of Heunburg
Frederick I, Count of Celje ∞ Diemut of Walsee	Władysław I Łokietek	Stephen II, Ban of Bosnia
Casimir III the Great	Ulrich I, Count of Celje ∞ Adelaide of Ortenburg	Hermann I of Celje	Catherine of Bosnia, Countess of Cilli	Elizabeth of Poland, Queen of Hungary ∞ Charles I of Hungary
Anna of Poland, Countess of Celje	William, Count of Celje	Hermann II, Count of Celje ∞ Anna Schaunberg	Elizabeth of Bosnia	Louis I of Hungary
2.Anna of Celje	Władysław II Jagiełło	Frederick II, Count of Celje ∞1.Elizabeth of Frankopan; 2.Veronika of Desenice	2.Barbara of Cilli	Sigismund, Holy Roman Emperor	1.Mary, Queen of Hungary	1.Jadwiga of Poland
Ulrich II, Count of Celje ∞ Katarina Branković

== See also ==
- Counts of Celje
- Skrad castle
