= Ulrich of Sanneck =

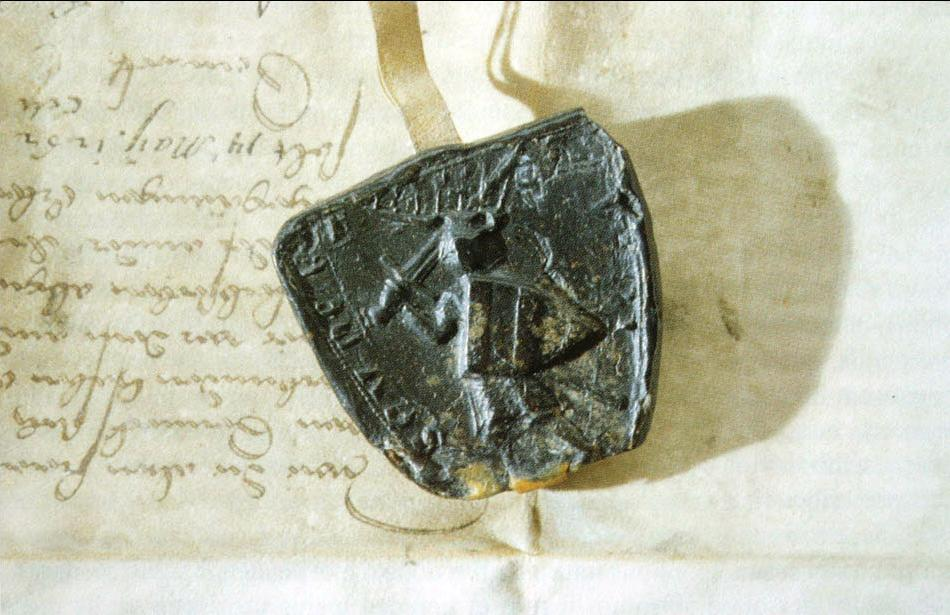
- Seal of Ulrich of Sanneck

Lord of Žovnek
- Reign: around 1286 - 1316
- Predecessor: Liutpold III of Sanneck
- Successor: Frederick I, as Count of Celje
- Born: Žovnek Castle
- Noble family: House of Sanneck
- Spouses: Anne of Sternberg, Catherine of Heunburg
- Issue: Frederick I of Celje
- Father: Conrad I of Sanneck

Ulrich of Sanneck (German: Ulrich von Sanneck, Slovene: Ulrik Žovneški; around 1255 – 1316), Lord of Žovnek (Sanneck, in German), was a free noble (roughly equivalent to a baron) in the March of Savinja in what was then the Holy Roman Empire and is now in Slovenia. During the struggle between Henry, Duke of Carinthia and the Habsburg rulers of Austria and Styria, he sided with the latter. By accepting the Habsburgs as his liege lords, he was instrumental in transferring the lordship over the Savinja region from the Meinhardiner-dominated Carniola to Habsburg Styria. His second marriage with the noblewoman Catherine of Heunburg would enable their son to claim the Heunburg inheritance in Carinthia and in the Savinja Valley, including the strategically important Celje Castle. This union of the Sanneck (Žovnek) and Heunburg (Vovbre) noble houses would give birth to the House of Celje.

== Life ==
Earlier historians believed there were two Ulrichs of Sanneck in the second half of the 13th century, Ulrich I and Ulrich II. Since at least the 1960s, however, the consensus has shifted, and it is now believed there was one single nobleman with that name. It is now considered that Ulrich was a younger son of Conrad I of Sanneck, a free noble in the March of Savinja, a strategically important border region fragmented among many small estates and contested by larger dynasties, such as the Babenbergs, the Spanheims and the Přemyslids. In 1278, Ulrich fought in the Battle of Marchfeld on the side of king Rudolf I against Ottokar II, king of Bohemia and the recently deposed duke of Austria and Styria. After defeating Ottokar, the Habsburgs and the House of Gorizia-Tyrol divided the spoils among themselves, with Austria and Styria going to the former, and Carinthia and Carniola to the latter; the Savinja Valley became a buffer zone between the two domains. The Lords of Sanneck sought to increase their power by balancing between the two houses.

After the death of his older brothers Conrad II around 1262 and Luitpold around 1286, Ulrich remained the sole heir of the Sanneck estates centered around Žovnek Castle in the Upper Savinja Valley. Following the death of his younger brother Gebhard III around 1292, Ulrich remained the sole Lord of Sanneck. After the death of his first wife, Anne of Sternberg, he married Catherine of Heunburg, the firstborn daughter of Ulrich II Count of Heunburg and Agnes of Baden, the titular heiress of the House of Babenberg through her mother Gertrude of Austria.

In 1308, Ulrich took the side of Albert of Habsburg and his sons Rudolph and Frederick in their feud against Henry of Gorizia-Tyrol over the inheritance of the Bohemian throne. By handing over his lands to the Habsburgs and receiving them back from them as a fief, Ulrich became a Habsburg vassal, significantly weakening Henry's position in the strategically important region between Styria and Carniola. In the peace treaty of 1308, confirmed in 1311, the Savinja Valley was finally incorporated into Habsburg Styria.

Ulrich died around 1316. His son Frederick would successfully claim his mother's inheritance in southeastern Carinthia and in Savinja, including the Celje Castle, thus doubling his possessions and paving the way for the rise of the House of Celje.

== Family tree ==
Herman VI, Margrave of Baden | Gertrude of Austria
Conrad I of Sanneck | 2.Ulrich II, Count of Heunburg | Agnes of Baden | 1.Ulrich III, Duke of Carinthia
Ulrich of Sanneck | Catherine of Heunburg | Margaret of Heunburg | Ulrich IV, Count of Pfannberg
Wladislaw I of Poland | Frederick I of Celje | Stephen II, Ban of Bosnia | Vladislav of Bosnia | Ulrich V of Pfannberg
Casimir III of Poland | Ulrich I of Celje | Hermann I of Celje | Catherine of Bosnia | Elizabeth of Poland | Charles I of Hungary
Anna of Poland | William of Celje | Hermann II of Celje | Elizabeth of Bosnia | Louis of Hungary
Frederick II, Count of Celje | 2.Barbara of Celje | Sigismund of Bohemia | 1.Mary, Queen of Hungary
Ulrich II of Celje
2.Anna of Cilli | Władysław II Jagiełło | 1.Jadwiga of Poland
