= William, Count of Celje =

Styrian nobleman

William of Celje
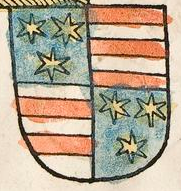
- William's coat of arms

Count of Celje
- Reign: 1385 – 1392
- Predecessor: Hermann I of Celje
- Successor: Hermann II of Celje
- Noble family: House of Celje
- Spouse: Anna of Poland
- Issue: Anna of Celje
- Father: Ulrich I
- Mother: Adelaide of Ortenburg

William of Celje (German: Wilhelm von Cilli, Slovene: Viljem Celjski; c. 1361 – 19 August 1392), also William of Cilli, Count of Celje, was a Styrian nobleman who was married to Anna of Poland, daughter of the Polish king Casimir the Great. He was the co-ruler of the House of Celje together with his uncle Hermann I until 1385 and then with his cousin Hermann II until his death. William's only daughter, Anna of Celje, married the Polish King Władysław II Jagiełło in order to strengthen his claim to the Polish throne.

== Life ==
William was the only child of Ulrich I, Count of Celje and Adelaide of Ortenburg. The date of his birth is unknown, but was probably in the early 1360s. After his father's death in 1368, William was raised by his uncle Hermann I of Celje. Hermann ruled in his nephew's name, and upon William's coming of age, they ruled jointly. After Hermann's death in 1385, William continued to rule with his cousin, Hermann's namesake son. This was in accordance with the family tradition which avoided splitting the estates by having male members of the family rule together.

William also continued the family tradition of allegiance to the Habsburgs who had become the Celjes' liege lords in the early 1300s. It was, however, during his rule that the Counts of Celje strengthened their positions by developing family and political connections stretching far beyond their native region, thus rapidly emancipating themselves from the Habsburg tutelage.

Together with his uncle Hermann I and his cousin Hermann II, William took part in the crusade against Samogitians in 1377, as part of the entourage of Duke Albert III of Austria. Like his father and grandfather before him, he served as Landeshauptmann (governor) of the Habsburg Duchy of Carniola between 1389 and 1390. In 1387, he was enfeoffed with the castle and estate of Dravograd by the Habsburg duke Albert III, further expanding the Celje's possessions along the Drava River in southern Carinthia.

William fell ill during an expedition against the Ottomans. He died in Vienna, and was buried in the Minorite Church in Celje.

== Marriage and children ==
In 1373, William was betrothed to Elizabeth of Gorizia, daughter of the imperial prince Meinhard, count of Gorizia and palatine count in Carinthia. However, Elizabeth died young, and William eventually married the daughter of the late Polish king Casimir the Great.

William's father Ulrich had been a mercenary military commander in the service of the Hungarian king Louis I. When Louis inherited the Polish crown, Casimir's daughter (and Louis's cousin) Anna was betrothed to William. The marriage took place on April 6, 1380. A daughter, Anna, was born in the marriage. She would eventually marry king Vladislav II of Poland.

William died in 1392 without sons, and was succeeded by his cousin Hermann II, who became the sole ruler of the House of Celje.

== Family ties with the Polish monarchs ==
William's uncle and caretaker Hermann was the brother-in-law of the Hungarian king Louis of Anjou. In 1370, Louis succeeded his uncle Casimir the Great as King of Poland (Louis's mother Elizabeth was Casimir's sister). Casimir had died without sons, he did however have two daughters who survived into adulthood. One of them, Anna, was still alive at the time of her father's death. At the time of Louis's ascension to the Polish throne, Anna was only four, and thus in no position to threaten Louis's claim. In order to neutralize any possible future threat from her part (or by a husband or son of hers), Louis, who was now her caretaker, decided to betroth her to a loyal, faraway and relatively unimportant ally. The House of Celje could only benefit from marrying a princess of royal blood, but they were in no position to challenge Louis's kingship. In 1380, at the age of fourteen, Anna was married to William. ∞v married William's daughter Anna, the only surviving granddaughter of the last Piast king Casimir the Great.

William was thus both the son-in-law and the father-in-law of a Polish king; however, Casimir III died before his marriage to Anna of Poland, and her daughter's marriage to Vladislav II took place after his death.

Ulrich of Sanneck ∞ Catherine of Heunburg
Frederick I of Celje ∞ Diemut of Wallsee	Stephen II of Bosnia	Elizabeth of Poland ∞ Charles I of Hungary
Casimir III of Poland	Ulrich I of Celje ∞ Adelaide of Ortenburg	Hermann I of Celje	Catherine of Bosnia	Elizabeth of Bosnia	Louis I of Hungary and Poland
Anna of Poland	William, Count of Celje	Hermann II ∞ Anna Schaunberg
Anna of Celje	Władysław II Jagiełło	Frederick II, Count of Celje ∞ Elizabeth of Frankopan	Barbara of Cilli	Sigismund, Holy Roman Emperor	Mary, Queen of Hungary	Jadwiga of Poland
Ulrich II, Count of Celje ∞ Katarina Branković
