= Hermann I of Celje =

Styrian nobleman

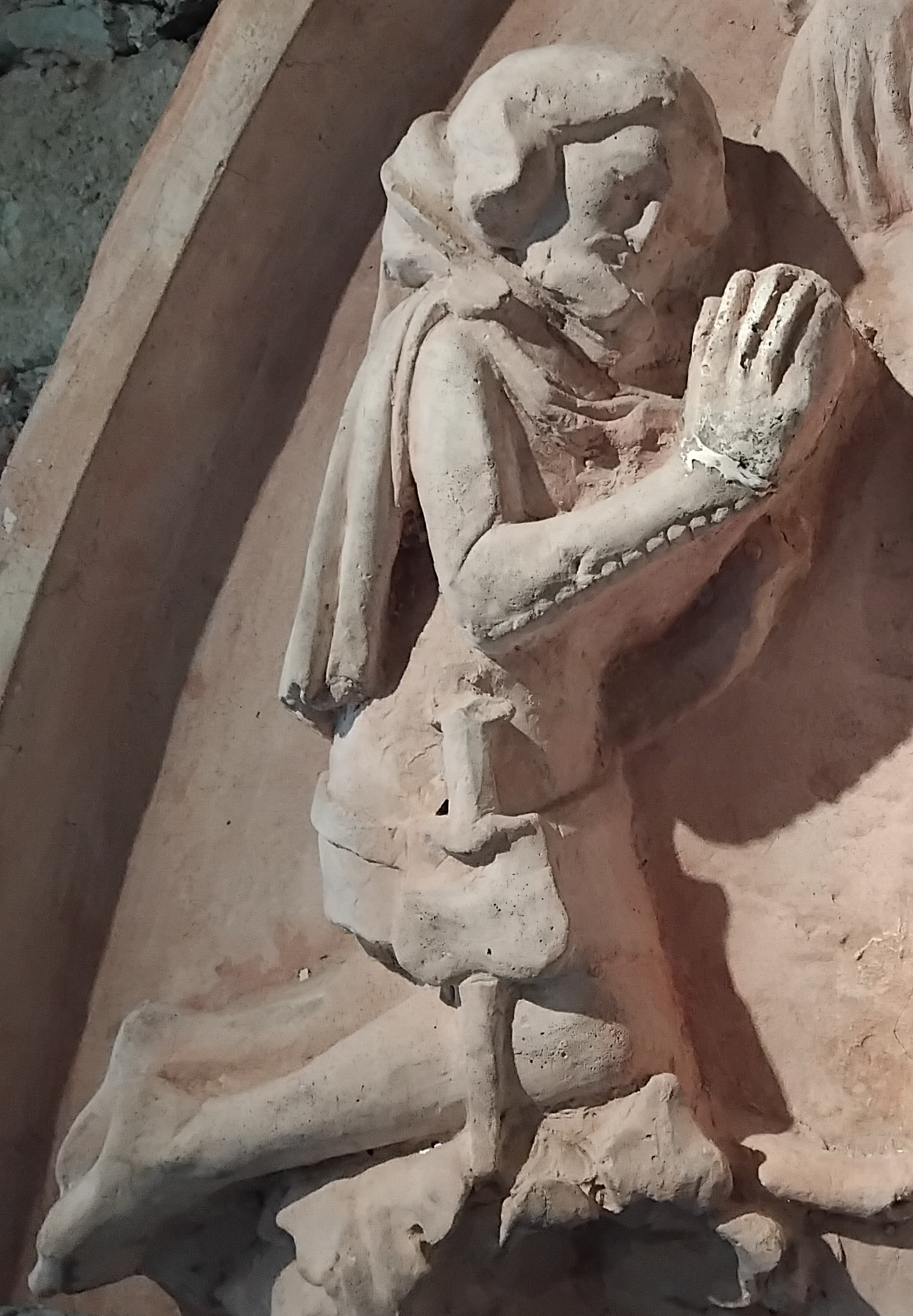
- Hermann I, Count of Celje

Count of Celje
- Reign: 1359/60 – 1385
- Predecessor: Ulrich I
- Successor: Hermann II
- Noble family: House of Celje
- Spouse: Catherine of Bosnia
- Issue: Hermann II
- Father: Frederick I
- Mother: Diemut of Walsee

Hermann I (German: Hermann von Cilli, Slovene: Herman Celjski; around 1333 – 21 March 1385), Count of Celje, was a Styrian nobleman, who was head of the House of Celje between 1359 and 1385. In the first decade, he ruled together with his older brother Ulrich. After Ulrich's death, Hermann took over the custody of his nephew William and ruled as the de facto head of the family. Under his rule, the House of Celje began expanding its influence from its power base in present-day Slovenia and southern Carinthia to Central Europe and the Balkans. By marriage to the Bosnian princess Catherine, whose exact parentage is disputed, Hermann became the brother-in-law either of the Hungarian and Polish king Louis the Great, or of the Bosnian king Tvrtko I. His son Hermann II further expanded the family's wealth and influence. By the time of his death, Hermann I was the largest landowner in the territory of present-day Slovenia, where his possessions significantly outnumbered those of his Habsburg liege lords.

== Life ==
Little is known of Hermann's early life. He was the second-born son of Frederick of Sanneck, first Count of Celje, and his wife Diemut from the noble Wallsee family. His father had inherited the Celje Castle and took possession of it in 1332, but it's unclear whether Hermann was born there or in the nearby Žovnek Castle, their ancestral home. After his father's death in 1359 or 1360, Hermann took over the family estates which were significantly enlarged during his father's tenure, and ruled them together with his older brother Ulrich I. This was in accordance with the family tradition which avoided splitting the inheritance among brothers, and instead opted for shared rule among them. After Ulrich's death in 1368, Hermann became the sole administrator of the Celje estates, ruling also in the name of his 7-year old nephew William.

Together with his son Hermann II and nephew William, Hermann took part in the crusade against Samogitians in 1377, as part of the entourage of Duke Albert III of Austria.

Hermann died in 1385, and was succeeded by his second-born son Hermann, as his first-born son Hans died already in 1372.

== Marriage and children ==
Hermann was married to Catherine of Bosnia, a princess from the ruling Kotromanić dynasty. Their first born son John (Hans) died at the age of nine. Two children survived infancy:

- Hermann II, a claimant to the Bosnian throne; married Anna of Schaunberg and had issue, among whom Barbara of Cilli, Holy Roman Empress.
- Walburga, married Bernhard of Ptuj (Pettau), no issue.

== Family ==
Ancestors of Hermann I of Celje

8. Conrad I of Sanneck
4. Ulrich of Sanneck
9. Sophie of Pfannberg-Peggau
2. Frederick I of Celje
10. Ulrich II of Heunburg
5. Catherine of Heunburg
11. Agnes of Baden
1. Hermann I, Count of Celje
12. Eberhard III. of Walsee
6. Ulrich I. of Walsee-Graz
13. Adelaide of Waldburg
3. Diemut of Wallsee
14. Dietrich of Rohrau
7. Diemut of Rohrau
15. Diemut of Feldsburg

Conrad I of Sanneck ∞ Sophie of Pfannberg-Peggau
Wladislaw of Poland	Ulrich of Sanneck	Catherine of Heunburg
Frederick I of Celje ∞ Diemut of Wallsee
Casimir III of Poland	Ulrich I of Celje	Hermann I of Celje	Catherine of Bosnia	Elizabeth of Poland ∞ Charles I of Hungary
Anna of Poland	William of Celje	Hermann II of Celje	Anna of Schaunberg	Elizabeth of Bosnia	Louis I of Hungary and Poland
Anna of Celje	Władysław II Jagiełło of Poland	Frederick II of Celje ∞ Elizabeth of Frankopan	Barbara of Celje	Sigismund of Luxembourg king of Bohemia, Germany	Mary of Hungary	Jadwiga of Poland
Ulrich II, Count of Celje	Katarina Branković
