= Hermann II, Count of Celje =

Styrian prince and magnate

Hermann II of Celje
- Count of Celje, Zagorje and Ortenburg; Prince of the Holy Roman Empire
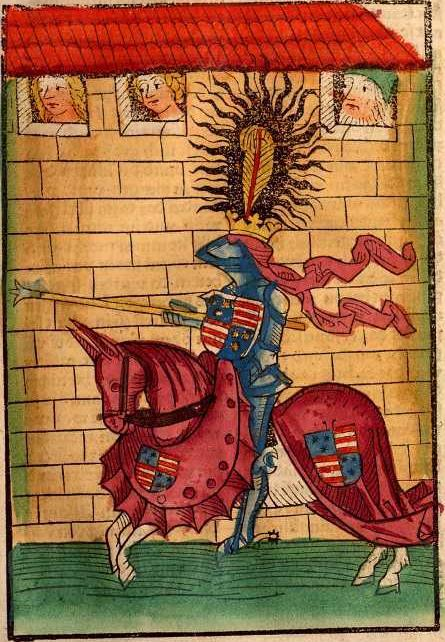
- Hermann at the Council of Constance
- Reign: 1385/1392-1435
- Predecessor: Hermann I, William (co-ruler)
- Born: Celje
- Died: Bratislava
- Buried: Pleterje Charterhouse, Duchy of Carniola (today in Slovenia)
- Noble family: House of Celje
- Spouse: Anna of Schaunberg
- Issue: Frederick II, Count of Celje; Hermann III; Barbara, Holy Roman Empress; Elizabeth of Celje; Anne of Celje; Hermann of Cilli (legitimized)
- Father: Hermann I of Celje
- Mother: Catherine of Bosnia

Hermann II (Slovene: Herman; early 1360s – 13 October 1435), Count of Celje, was a Styrian prince and magnate, most notable as the faithful supporter and father-in-law of the Hungarian king and Holy Roman Emperor Sigismund of Luxembourg. Hermann's loyalty to the King ensured him generous grants of land and privileges that led him to become the greatest landowner in Slavonia. He served as governor of Carniola, and twice as ban of the combined provinces of Slavonia, Croatia and Dalmatia, and was recognized by a treaty in 1427 as heir presumptive to the Kingdom of Bosnia. The House of Celje's rise to power culminated in achieving the dignity of Prince of the Holy Roman Empire. At the peak of his power, he controlled two thirds of the land in Carniola, most of Lower Styria, and exercised power over all of medieval Croatia. Hermann was one of the most important representatives of the House of Celje, having brought the dynasty from regional importance to the foreground of Central European politics.

== Family ==
Hermann II was the younger son of Count Hermann I of Celje and his wife, Catherine of Bosnia. The House of Celje were Styrian vassals of the Habsburg dukes of Styria and Carinthia with estates along the river Savinja, in present-day Slovenia, as well as in much of Carniola and parts of Carinthia. Hermann's mother was a member of the House of Kotromanić, daughter of Ban Stephen II of Bosnia and thus cousin of the first King of Bosnia, Tvrtko I. His older brother Hans (c. 1363–1372) having predeceased their father, Hermann was the sole heir of their father upon the latter's death on 21 March 1385. The death of his son-less cousin William on 19 September 1392 made him the sole possessor of the family titles and estates.

Hermann II married Anna, daughter of Count Henry of Schaunberg and Ursula of Gorizia, in c. 1377. They had six children: Frederick (1379–1454), Hermann (1380–1426), Elizabeth (1382), Anne (c. 1384–c. 1439), Louis (1387–1417) and Barbara (1392–1451). Hermann had his illegitimate son, Hermann (1383–1421), legitimized and installed as Bishop of Freising. For his legitimate issue he arranged prestigious marriages, but encountered serious problems with his firstborn. Frederick was married to Elizabeth of Krk until she was murdered in 1422; Frederick himself was likely the culprit. He quickly remarried to Veronika of Desenice, but Hermann refused to accept a minor petty noblewoman as his new daughter-in-law. He accused her of witchcraft and had her drowned. Frederick's rebellion against Hermann ended with Frederick's imprisonment.

== Rise of Celje ==
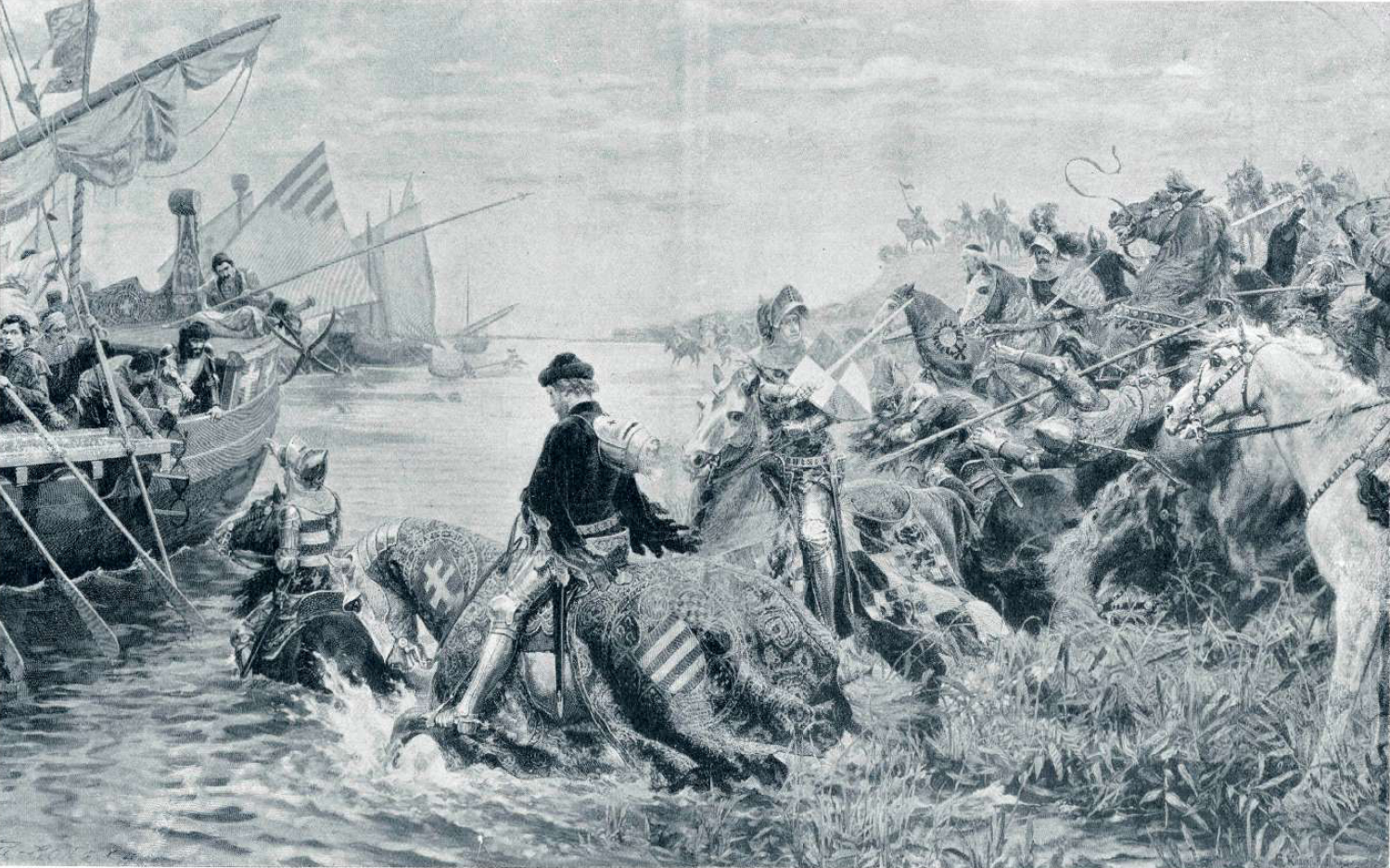
Romanticized portrayal of the Battle of Nicopolis, with Count Hermann helping King Sigismund, by Hermann Knackfuss

In 1396, Hermann bravely fought at the side of King Sigismund of Hungary during the battle against the Ottoman Turks in the Bulgarian town of Nicopolis. The Christian coalition was soundly defeated. Hermann saved Sigismund's life. The two escaped the battlefield on the same fishing boat and underwent a long journey back to Hungary together. Sigismund rewarded Hermann by assigning to him the district of Varaždin in 1397, followed in 1399 by various other districts in Zagorje along the border of the Kingdom of Croatia and the Holy Roman Empire. These grants were hereditary and made the Celje counts the greatest landowners in Slavonia; from then on, they styled themselves "counts of Celje and Zagorje".

Hermann's loyalty persisted during the Hungarian civil war, when Sigismund's kingdoms of Croatia and Hungary were being claimed by King Ladislaus of Naples with the support of Sigismund's rebellious vassals. The rebels succeeded in capturing and imprisoning Sigismund in 1401. Hermann and the Palatine of Hungary Nicholas II Garay procured his release later that year, after Hermann threatened to invade Hungary. The relations between the two men then became even closer. Sigismund had promised to remove foreigners such as Hermann from state offices upon being liberated, but never carried out the promise.

In 1405, Sigismund married Hermann's youngest daughter Barbara and granted extensive lands in Slavonia to his father-in-law. Anne, another daughter of Hermann, was married to the Palatine, linking the three families through affinity. In 1406, Sigismund named Hermann Ban of Dalmatia and Croatia and Ban of Slavonia. He held these offices until 1408 and again from 1423 until 1435, benefiting from the dedicated support of Eberhard, the German-born Bishop of Zagreb. All of this made the House of Celje the most powerful family in the Kingdom of Croatia. Hermann was one of the founding members of Sigismund's elite Order of the Dragon, established in 1408. For reasons of economy rather than religious fanaticism, Hermann expelled all Jews from his domain.

When Count Frederick III of Ortenburg, the last of his line, died in 1418, his domain was inherited by Hermann. From then on, he controlled three quarters of Carinthia. This made it easier for him to attain imperial immediacy, his family's long-set goal. The marriage of his son Louis and Duke Ernest of Bavaria's daughter Beatrix provided Hermann with a powerful ally against his Habsburg overlords. His goal was finally achieved in 1423 when Duke Ernest of Styria and Carinthia renounced his feudal supremacy over the counts of Celje. This was a reward by Sigismund, also King of Germany since 1411, for Hermann's successful negotiation with the dissatisfied Croatian nobles. It came with the right of coinage as well as the right to collect tolls and revenues from various mines. Now enjoying a direct legal relationship with the Crown, Hermann was free to concentrate on a new goal: becoming Prince of the Holy Roman Empire. He was close to succeeding in this endeavour as well in 1430, but the draft charter granting him this honour never seems to have been published, possibly due to Habsburg objections.

== Bosnian succession ==
In 1426, the Kingdom of Bosnia was under constant threat of Ottoman raids. Its king, Tvrtko II, was desperate to obtain Hungarian protection. King Sigismund agreed but under a condition: the childless Tvrtko was to recognize Hermann, his second cousin and Sigismund's father-in-law, as his heir presumptive. The Bosnian nobility was outraged by the demand. Hermann's accession would have meant an increased influence of Hungary over Bosnia, something they were determined to prevent. Besides, they were used to controlling the royal succession and considered it their right to elect kings. They also feared that Hermann, whose domain enveloped Bosnia, would assist Tvrtko in curbing their power and privileges. The plan nevertheless went ahead; a treaty providing for Hermann's accession in the event of Tvrtko's death without male issue was signed on 2 September 1427.

== Death and aftermath ==
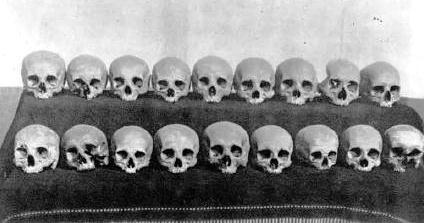
Skulls of the counts of Celje

Hermann died in Pressburg on 13 October 1435. Tvrtko indeed died childless, but only eight years later, and Hermann thus never became King of Bosnia. As it happened, the Bosnian crown never passed to the House of Celje at all. Hermann was buried in the Pleterje Charterhouse, a monastery he had founded in 1403 as the last Carthusian monastery in the Slovene lands. The Celje were recognized as princes of the Holy Roman Empire a year following his death, though there is spurious evidence that suggests this may have taken place shortly before Hermann's death, on 27 September 1435. Hermann's allodial titles passed undivided to his firstborn and the only son who outlived him, the 56-year-old Frederick II.

The most outstanding among the counts of Celje, Hermann inherited the headship of a family of merely local significance and eventually transformed it into one of Central Europe's most prominent noble families. Hermann's efforts to help Sigismund strengthen the royal authority and centralize the state earned him a bad reputation in old Hungarian historiography, which was itself usually sympathetic to Hungarian nobility. He was portrayed as a selfish manipulator of a weak king.

== Family ==
=== Marriage and children ===
Hermann married Anna, a daughter of Henry VII, Count of Schaunberg. They had six children who survived infancy:

- Frederick II (c. 1379–1454), married first to Elizabeth of Frankopan, had issue; married second to Veronika of Desenice, had issue;
- Hermann III (c. 1380 – 30 July 1426), married first to Elizabeth of Abensberg, had a daughter Margareta; married second to Beatrice of Wittelsbach, daughter of duke Ernst of Bavaria, no issue;
- Louis (Ludwig), born in the 1380s; he was given up for adoption to his childless cousin Fredrick III of Ortenburg (d. 1418); died in 1417 without issue;
- Anna, married Nicholas II Garai, Palatine of Hungary, had issue;
- Elizabeth (died 1426), married Henry VI of Gorizia, had issue;
- Barbara (1396–1451), married Sigismund of Luxembourg, had issue.

=== Family tree ===
Ulrich of Sanneck ∞ Catherine of Heunburg | Stephen I of Bosnia
Casimir III the Great | Frederick I of Celje ∞ Diemut of Wallsee | Elizabeth of Poland ∞ Charles I of Hungary | Stephen II of Bosnia | Vladislaus of Bosnia
Ulrich I of Celje ∞ Adelaide of Ortenburg | Hermann I of Celje | Catherine of Bosnia | Louis I of Hungary | Elizabeth of Bosnia | Tvrtko I of Bosnia
Anna of Poland | William of Celje | Hermann II, Count of Celje ∞ Anna of Schaunberg | Tvrtko II of Bosnia
2.Anna of Celje | Władysław II Jagiełło | Frederick II of Celje ∞ Elizabeth of Frankopan | 2.Barbara of Celje | Sigismund of Luxembourg | 1.Mary, Queen of Hungary | 1.Jadwiga of Poland
Ulrich II, Count of Celje ∞ Katarina Branković

=== Descendants ===
Through his great granddaughter Elizabeth of Austria, Queen of Poland, Hermann is the ancestor of the last five Jagiellonian kings of Poland, Saint Casimir, the Vasa kings of Poland, King Charles III (17th great-grandson), King Harald V (16th great-grandson), King Felipe VI (17th great-grandson), King Carl XVI Gustaf (16th great-grandson), and King Frederik X (17th great-grandson). Through her sister Anne of Luxembourg, Landgravine of Thuringia, he is the ancestor of the Dukes and later Kings of Prussia and Emperors of Germany.

Regnal titles
| Preceded by Hermann I & William | Count of Celje; 1385–1435 with William (1385–1392) | Succeeded by Frederick II of Celje |
| Preceded by Frederick III | Count of Ortenburg; 1418–1435 | Succeeded by Frederick II of Celje |
Political offices
| Preceded by Paul Pécsi | Ban of Slavonia; Ban of Croatia and Dalmatia; 1406–1408 | Succeeded by Karlo of Krbava |
| Preceded by Denis Marcali | Ban of Slavonia; 1423–1435 | Succeeded by Matko Talovac |
