= Counts of Ortenburg =

Medieval Carinthian comital family with Bavarian roots

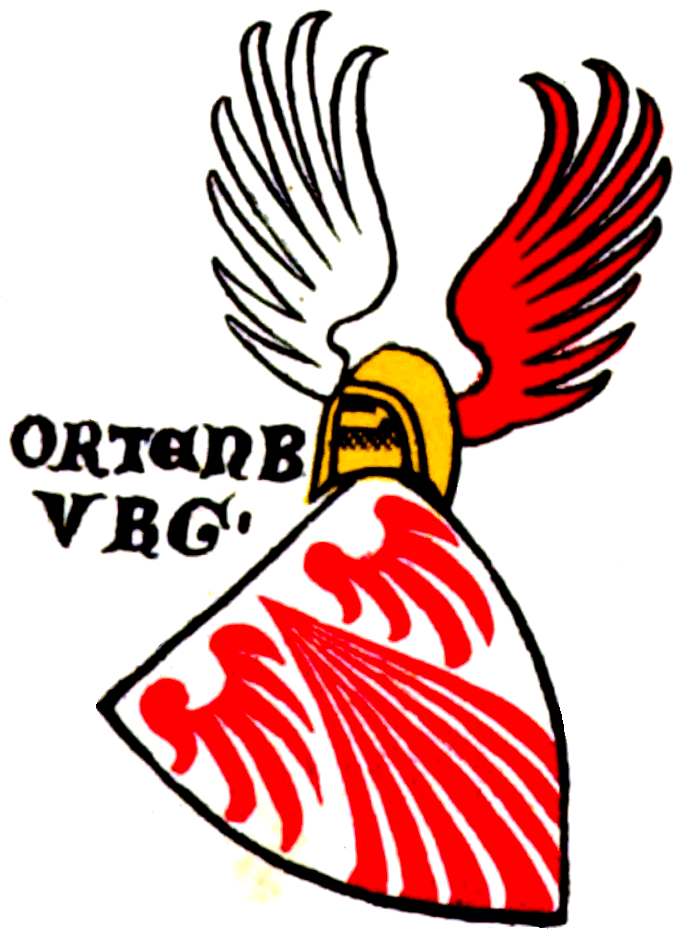
Ortenburg coat of arms, c. 1335/1345

The Counts of Ortenburg (German: Grafen von Ortenburg) were a comital family in the mediaeval Duchy of Carinthia. Though they had roots in Bavarian nobility, an affiliation with the Imperial Counts of Ortenburg, a branch line of the Rhenish Franconian House of Sponheim, is not established.

== History ==
Little is known about the reasons the Ortenburgs settled in the Carinthian Lurngau. No charters are available on the creation of the Ortenburg Castle on the northern slope of Mt. Goldeck above the village of Baldramsdorf, nor about the manner in which the Ortenburgs obtained their property.

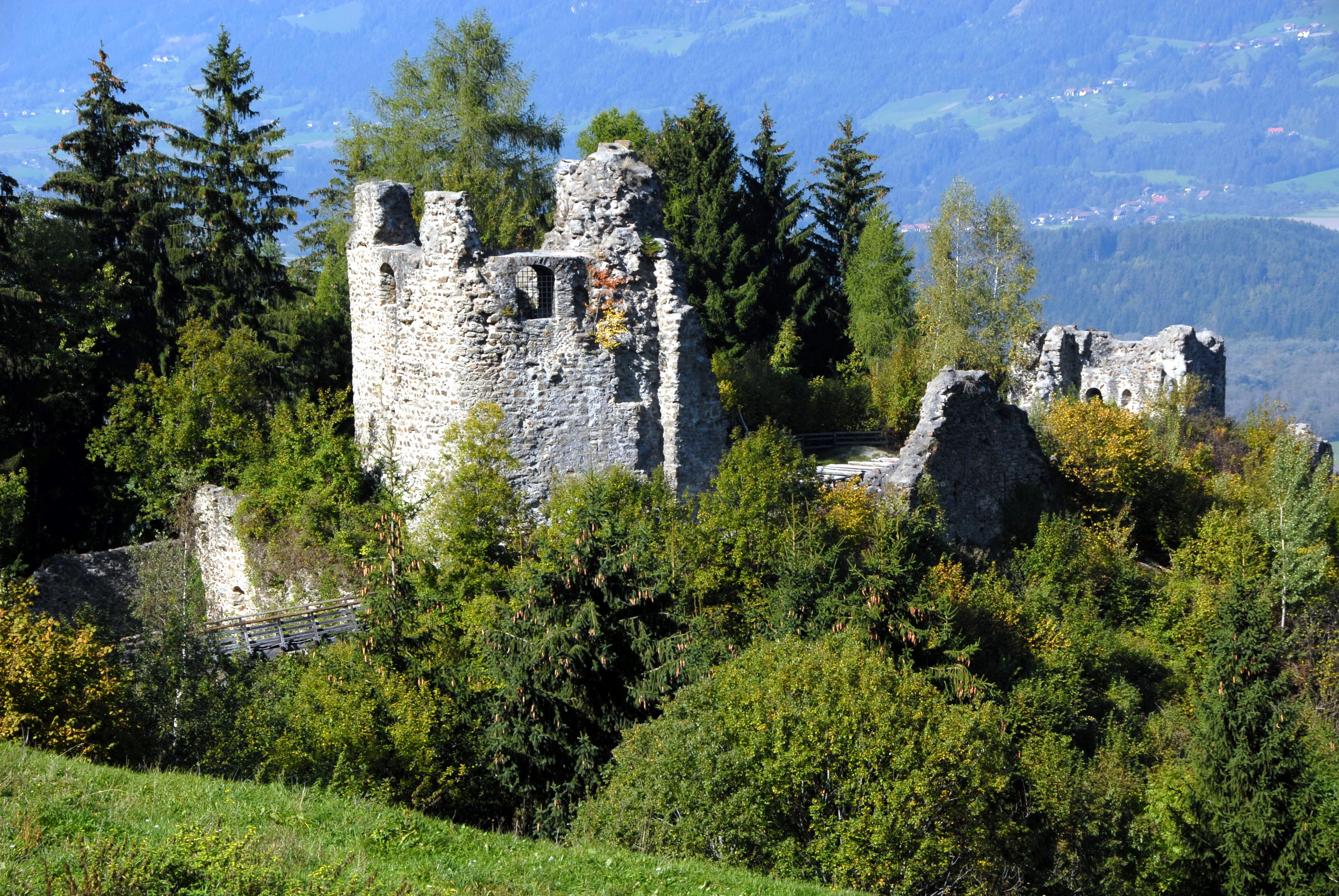
Burgruine Ortenburg

In 1072, one Adalbert of Ortenburg, probably a younger son of Count Hartwig II of Grögling-Hirschberg (d. 1068/69), served as a Vogt stattholder in the Carinthian possessions of the Bishops of Freising. His castle Hortenburc was first mentioned in a 1091 deed, and was situated south of the Drava river within the Archdiocese of Aquileia — across from Hohenburg Castle held by the rivaling Counts of Lurn, liensmen of the Salzburg archbishops.

When the Lurn dynasty became extinct in 1135, the Counts of Ortenburg received large estates stretching from Möllbrücke down the Drava Valley to Rennstein near Villach. They also held possessions in the Gegend Valley around Afritz. In 1191 they founded a hospital (Spittl) at the bridge across the Lieser river—site of the later town of Spittal an der Drau. In the twelfth and thirteenth centuries, Herman and Ulrich of Ortenburg served as Bishops of Gurk. Count Otto II joined the Crusade of 1197 of Emperor Henry VI. About 1330, Count Meinhard of Ortenburg acquired the estates of the extinct Counts of Sternberg between Lake Ossiach and Wörthersee. In the fourteenth century, the dynasty also owned the lands of Gottschee in Lower Carniola, where they founded the town of Gottschee (Kočevje) with German colonists from their Upper Carinthian lands.

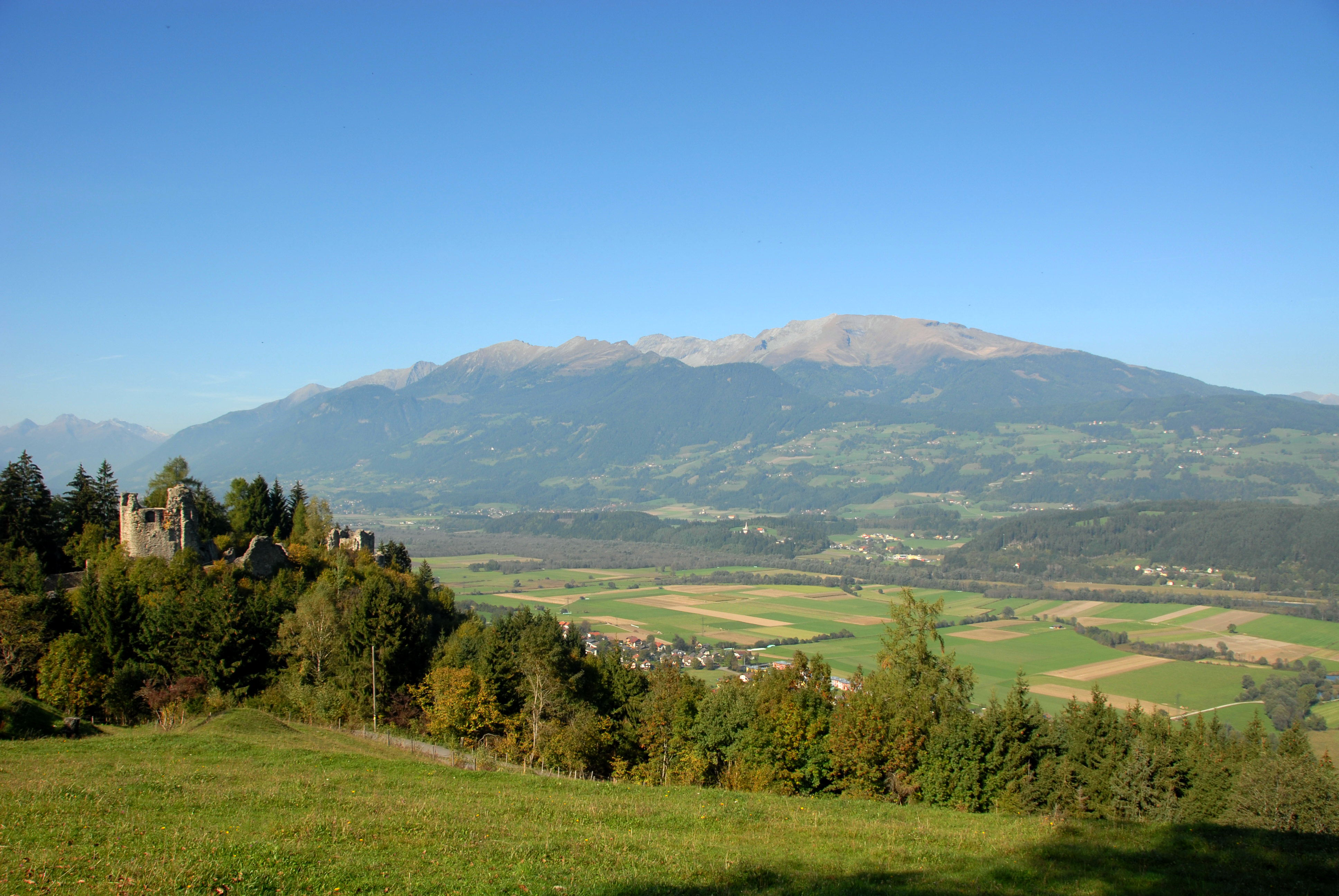
Ruins of Ortenburg Castle overlooking the Lurnfeld Valley of the Drava

Struggling for autonomy against the Carinthian dukes from the House of Sponheim and their Meinhardiner successors, the Ortenburgs avoided open conflict. In 1306, when the Meinhardiner duke Henry of Carinthia reached for the Bohemian crown, the Ortenburgs supported his rival Rudolf I of Habsburg. Soon after, their immediate rights were acknowledged by the Habsburg king Albert I of Germany, and later confirmed by Emperor Sigismund in a 1420 deed. Two years before however, the last Count Frederick III of Ortenburg had died without heirs and his estates were inherited by Count Hermann II of Celje (Cilli).

When the Counts of Celje themselves became extinct with the killing of Hermann's grandson Ulrich II in 1456, the Counts of Ortenburg-Neuortenburg claimed their ostensible rights, but failed to prove their kinship to the Carinthian Ortenburgs. Their attempts to gain the Ortenburg estates lasted until the 18th century, but were all rejected. Instead, the Habsburg emperor Frederick III took possession of the Ortenburg estates, which his great-grandson Archduke Ferdinand I of Austria granted to his treasurer Gabriel von Salamanca in 1524.

Today, the ruins of the Ortenburg Castle can still be seen on Goldeck mountain above the village of Baldramsdorf, west of Spittal an der Drau in Carinthia, Austria.

== Genealogy ==
- Adalbert I (1038 – 1096), married Bertha of Dießen-Andechs
  - Otto I (1088 – 1157), married Agnes of Auersperg
    - Henry I (1138 – 1192)
    - Otto II (1140 – 1197), married Brigida of Haimburg (Heunburg)
      - Ulrich (1188 – 1253), Bishop of Gurk 1221 – 1253
      - Herman I (1196 – 1256), married Elizabeth of Heunburg, secondly Euphemia of Plain-Hardegg
        - Frederick I (1247 – 1304), regent of Carniola under King Rudolph I of Germany, married Adelheid, daughter of Count Meinhard I of Gorizia-Tyrol
          - Euphemia (1278 – 1316), married Count Hugo II of Werdenberg
          - Catharine (b. 1279), married Rizzardo IV da Camino
          - Meinhard I (1280 – 1332), regent of Carniola, founder of Gottschee County, married Elizabeth of Sternberg-Peggau
            - Meinhard II (d. 1337), married Belingeria della Torre
            - Herman II (d. 1338), married Adelheid of Hohenlohe
            - Elizabeth, married Stephen II, Ban of Bosnia
          - Otto III (1282 – 1343), married Sophia of Hardegg, daughter of Burgrave Berthold of Magdeburg
          - Adelheid (1284 – 1304), Count Ulrich IV of Berg-Schelklingen
          - Albert I (1286 – 1335)
            - Rudolph, married Margaret, daughter Count Albert II of Gorizia (Görz)
            - Adelheid (d. 1391), married Count Ulrich I of Celje (Cilli), son of Frederick I, Count of Celje.
            - Frederick II (d. 1355), married Margaret of Pfannberg
            - Albert (d. 1390), Prince-Bishop of Trent 1363 – 1390
            - Otto IV (d. 1374/76), regent of Carniola, married Anna of Celje, daughter of Frederick I, Count of Celje.
              - Frederick III (d. 1418), regent of Carniola, married Margaret of Teck
        - Euphemia (1256 – 1292), married Count Albert I of Gorizia
    - Hermann (1147 – 1200), Bishop of Gurk 1179 – 1180
    - Agnes (1149 – 1207), married Berthold I, Count of Tyrol
