= Windic March =

Frontier march of the Holy Roman Empire

Coordinates: 45°48′7.2″N 14°49′53.55″E

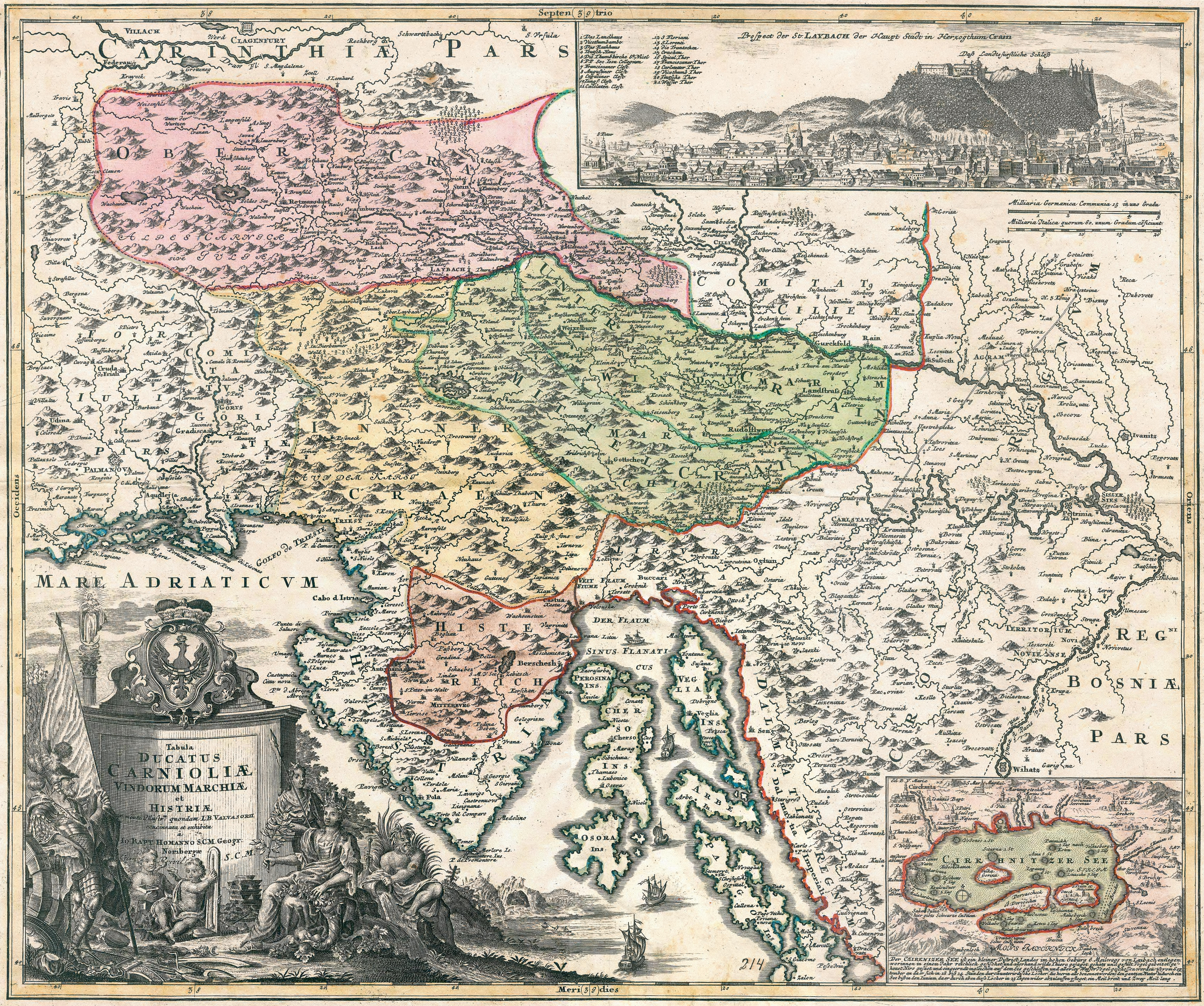
"Map of the Duchy of Carniola, Windic March and Istria", by Johann Homann (1663-1724), after Johann Weikhard von Valvasor (1641-1693): Lower Carniola and Windic March in green

Arms of the Windic March, featuring a traditional Slovene hat

The Windic March (German: Windische Mark; also known as Wendish March) was a medieval frontier march of the Holy Roman Empire, roughly corresponding to the Lower Carniola (Slovene: Dolenjska) region in present-day Slovenia. In Slovenian historiography, it is known as the Slovene March (Slovene: Slovenska marka or Slovenska krajina).

== Etymology ==
The name Windic is derived from Wends (German: Wenden), the name for Western Slavs settling in the Germania Slavica contact zone. The medieval German term Windisch referred to the Slovene language, but also to Slavic languages in general. It has the same etymology as Wendische, the historic German term for the Sorbian-speaking population in Lusatia. In the 6th and 7th century the term was used by Bavarian settlers to refer to the Slavic population in the East Alpine principality of Carantania. The medieval geographic term windisches Land referred also to the region of Slavonia. In this usage, March is defined as a frontier or border area between two countries or territories.

== History ==
=== Earliest mentions ===
The Chronicle of Fredegar mentions "Sclavos coinomento Winedorum" in 623. Samo's tribal union included the Windic March (Marca Vinedorum) of Duke Valuk (Wallucus Dux), located in the Eastern Alps, in 631.

=== 8th–10th century ===
The territory of the Windic march was contained within the larger March of Carniola in Carolingian times, but under King Otto I of Germany from about 960 on it was separated from Upper Carniola (Gorenjska) and integrated into the March of Savinja (or Soune). In 976 it was attached to the newly founded Duchy of Carinthia.

=== 11th–12th century ===
After Margrave William of Soune had been killed by the deposed Carinthian duke Adalbero in 1036, the Windic march was separated from Carinthia and reattached to the newly established March of Carniola, which was thereafter sometimes called "Carniola and the Windic March". In 1077 King Henry IV of Germany put Carniola and the Windic March under the direction of the Patriarch of Aquileia. From 1127 to 1131 the margravial territory was further expanded in several campaigns by the Counts of Weichselburg (or Weichselberg, modern Višnja Gora) against Croatia in the union with Hungary. Backed by the archbishop of Salzburg, they conquered the territory around Metlika up to the Kolpa River in the southeast, the later White Carniola (Bela krajina) region.

=== 13th century ===
Until 1209 the Counts of Weichselburg held extended possessions in the Windic March. Through a marriage to the last heiress Sophia of Weichselburg, the Counts of Andechs, then at the peak of their power as Margraves of Istria and Dukes of Merania came to dominate the territory. It was part of the dowry of Agnes of Merania, daughter of Duke Otto I of Andechs-Merania, upon her marriage with the Frederick II of Babenberg, son of Duke Leopold VI of Austria, in 1229. Frederick II thereafter called himself a dominus Carniole (Lord of Carniola) and succeeded his father as Duke of Austria and Styria in the following year.

In 1248 the title was picked up by Duke Ulrich III of Carinthia, who had married Agnes of Merania after Frederick's death in 1246. When Duke Ulrich died in 1269, King Ottokar II of Bohemia occupied and unified Carniola, the Windic March, the valley of the Savinja, and the Slovenj Gradec as "the march" of his vast kingdom extending from the Baltic Sea to the Adriatic. After 1282, despite King Rudolf I's grant to his sons, Carniola and the Windic march were united under the control of the Meinhardiner duke Meinhard of Carinthia. During this period, the entity became known as the County in the March and Möttlig (Metlika). After 1374, the Windic March fell to the House of Habsburg. The Habsburgs however soon pawned it to the Counts of Cilli who remained the de facto rulers of the territory until their extinction in 1456. The Habsburgs retook the Windic March together with all other Cilli possessions in the Holy Roman Empire. They immediately reunited it with Carniola, and the Windic March thus ceased to be a separate political entity.

The head of the House of Habsburg continued carrying the title of "Lord on the Windic March" in the grand title of the Emperor of Austria.

== See also ==
- Slovene Lands
- History of Slovenia
- Inner Austria
