= Mark an der Sann =

European polity

- before 980–1137/44
- A map of the Mark an der Sann (red) within the Duchy of Carinthia (pale) at the beginning of the 11th century. The March's southern subdivision is Gau Sauna while the northern one is Gau Zistanesfeld. The area on the right bank of the lower Sava, although not highlightened on the map, was also part of the Savinja March.
- Status: March
- Government: March
- Margrave
- Historical era: Medieval
  - Established: before 980
  - Last Margrave died: 1137/44
- Today part of: Slovenia

The Mark an der Sann (German for "March on the Savinja"; other designations and variations of the name include Sannmark, Sann-Grafschaft (or Markgrafschaft), (Mark)grafschaft Soune, Soun and Saunien, as well as simply Sanntal – Savinja valley) was a border march of the Holy Roman Empire, in the territory of present-day Slovenia. It was established in the second half of the 10th century to protect the Empire against its enemies to the east, especially from Hungarian raids.

== Territory ==
The territory included the catchment of the Savinja river, extending to the Sotla in the east. To the south, the March extended to the right bank of the river Sava and included the Krka basin, and the area around Višnja Gora.

From the 14th to the 16th century, the area on the right bank of the Sava was known as the Windic March (or Slovene March), while the left bank became known as the County of Cilli (Celje) from 1341 to 1456. In the early modern period, the former was fully incorporated into the Duchy of Carniola, and the latter into the Duchy of Styria, completing a long process of dismembering of the former March that began in the 12th century.

== History ==
By 895 there was already a "Mark an der Sawe", although whether it included the entire Savinja valley is unclear.

=== Old Souna ===
The first recorded mention of the Savinja county (German: Sann-Grafschaft) is on 24 October 980, when Emperor Otto II granted count Willihalm the entirety of his royal possessions in "Rachwin's county" between the Dobritsch mountains north of Heilenstein/Polzela near Cilli, Stenitz southeast of Weitenstein near Lindeck and Wresen southwest of Weitenstein for his faithful service.

The march was subordinate to the Duchy of Bavaria until 1002, and then the Duchy of Carinthia.

During the second phase of colonisation the possessions of the Archdiocese of Salzburg, which already included Rann an der Save in Carolingian times, were confirmed by Emperors Otto II and Otto III.

=== Margrave Wilhelm ===
The next Margrave (or Count) was Wilhelm II, the son of the afore mentioned count Willihalm and husband of Hemma of Gurk. On 15 April 1016, following intervention by Empress Kunigunde, Archbishop Heribert of Cologne, and Bishop Eberhard of Bamberg, Emperor Henry II granted him in "his county in the Sanngau" thirty Hufen (a quantity of land of roughly 7–15 hectares (17–37 acres)) in the Drachenburger Land, as well as all of the royal property between the rivers Sava, Sann (Savinja), Sutla and Neiring (Mirna). That is, the later Windisch-Landsberg, Peilenstein, Wisell and Nassenfuß of the Bishops of Gurk along with Rohitsch, Montpreis, Hörberg and Königsberg.

In 1025 the Windic March on the Savinja was detached from the Duchy of Carinthia.

In Bamberg on 11 May 1025, following the intervention of Queen Gisela and Archbishop Aribo of Mainz King Conrad II granted Wilhelm 30 Hufen in his county (referred to in Latin as Souna) between the rivers Kopreinitz (Koprivnica), Köttnig/Kötting (Hudinja) and Wogliena/Wogleina (Voglajna), and between the rivers Gurk and Sava (in Carniola) as well as all of his royal property in the mountains, valleys and forests.

On 30 December 1028 in Augsburg, at the request of (now) Empress Gisela, their son Henry and Patriarch Poppo of Aquileia, the now Emperor Conrad II bestowed upon count Wilhelm (or confirmed his possession of) 30 Hufen in villa Traskendorf (Drachenburger Land) and the possessions of his predecessor Henry II between the Sava and Savinja, Sutla and Mirna in the county of Sanngau; additionally, he dedicated a further 30 Hufen in the same county between the Koprivnica, Hudinja and Voglajna and between the Gurk and Sava.

In 1036 Count Wilhelm II was killed by the deposed Carinthian Duke Adalbero von Eppenstein as a means of revenge. Thereafter the counts of Ebersberg held the march along with neighbouring Carniola.

=== Donations of Countess Hemma ===
On 6 January 1043, Countess Hemma, Wilhelm's widow, handed over the majority of their possessions in Carinthia and the marches (particularly Reichenburg) to Archbishop Balduin of Salzburg in exchange for baptismal, funeral and tithe rights for Carinthian churches. The Savinja valley Allod later came to the Prince-Bishopric of Gurk. On 15 August 1043 Hemma donated their wholly owned property in the Savinja valley, that is all the afore mentioned territories acquired in the years 980, 1016 and 1025, to the church, using her Vogt Pretzlaus as a proxy. Hemma expressly exempted the villages of "Terenperch", Köttnig/Kötting, "Steindorf" and Sirdosege from her gifts, along with Reichenburg which had already been exchanged with Balduin of Salzburg.

Thanks to their affinity to Hemma, the Askuiner exercised great influence and power in this area as hereditary Vogts of Gruk. Indeed, by the 11th century they had already established the Fortress of Obercilli.

=== Spanheimer etc ===
Under Conrad II (1024–39) count Siegfried von Spanheim from Rheinfranken Richgard of Lavant married a Sieghardinger with a great deal of wealth in the march and in Carinthia. Count Siegfried was granted tree-covered crown land mostly consisting of forest by the King, particularly in Drau and Savinja areas, but also extending to the karst.

After 1036 the Savinja March was again separated from the Windic March.

It has also been established that the Aribonids in the Drau and Savinja valleys were wealthy at this time.

Alongside these large landowners in the Savinja valley were also the freemen of Kager, the Counts of Bogen and Heunburg, as well as the lords of Sanneck and the freemen of Hochenegg. They and their overlords seem to have led the great colonisation in this region.

In perhaps 1105, but certainly before 1122, the Askuiner Margrave Starkhand died, who with his brother Ulrich in 1103 appear to have borne witness to the document in which Duke Henry of Eppenstein of Carinthia remunerated Saint Lambert's Abbey; his successor was Günther, a son of the Heunburger Pilgrim von Hohenwart-Pozzuolo, the last Margrave of Soune (marchio de Cylie).

After his death in 1137 or 1144 the title of Margave was no longer held. Thereafter there were many extraterritorial areas in the march: in the south east lay the possessions of Salzburg and Gurk; in the west those of Aquileia and the Bishopric of Oberburg; in the south the Spanheim Lordship of Tüffer.

The Spanheims, having sided with the Pope in 1105-06 during the Investiture Controversy, took as part of their possessions that which the Gurkish hereditary Vogts, the Askuin counts, Starkhand and Werigand had lost.

In 1131 Archbishop Conrad I of Salzburg came to the Savinja area to secure peace with the Hungarians and to build the episcopal border fortresses of Pettau and Reichenburg against the Hungarians, as Countess Hemma's progeny had failed to provide an effective defence of the eastern border.

== Subsequent history ==
=== Otakars ===
In 1147 Count Bernhard von Trixen-Spanheim died and Tüffer (and Sachsenfeld along with Sachsenwart) reverted to Margrave Ottokar III of Styria. The resulting lordship stretched along the Savinja from Cilli to the Sava and next to the Sava over Trifail, and further down along the Sava until finally reaching Lichtenwald. It covered approximately 300 square kilometres (120 sq mi), and moderately enclosed the Salzburg episcopal territory of Lichtenwald-Rann, which perhaps arose from Countess Hemma's territory of Reichenburg. Thereafter it belonged to the large lordship of Tüffer and to Sachsenfeld, Sachsenwart and Hochenegg, the castles of Klausenstein and Freudenegg as well as the Amt of Ratschach in Carniola.

There was a Styrian Amt attested from 1182 and from 1227 the court of Tüffer stretched across the Sava, to which Schärfenberg evidently also belonged from 1287. H. Pirchegger believed that the later territory of the Otakars extended as far as the Archidiakonat Sanntal. The lordship of Tüffer was part of the ducatus (duchy), and from Tüffer the Duke of Styria also succeeded in the acquisition of the Vogtei over the nearby Gurkish Lordships.

=== Bohemia ===
After seizing Carniola, the Windic March, Windischgraz and the Savinja valley in 1269, King Ottokar II of Bohemia united the territories into a march.

=== Habsburg ===
In 1282 Carniola and the Windic March were loaned to the son of King Rudolf I (these lands were in fact subordinate to Meinhard II of Görz-Tirol)

Around 1300 the Counts of Heunburg (extinct by 1322) acquired the lordship of Cilli, the centre of the march. Only from about 1300 was there a strong lordly enforcement in the Savinja valley by way of the free lords of Sanneck.

=== Savinja valley to Styria ===
On 14 July 1311 Duke Henry of Carinthia of the Meinhardiner dynasty, having been worn down by the Habsburgs, ceded the Savinja valley on either side of the Sava to Styria.

=== Counts of Cilli ===
In 1323 Cilli passed to the Counts of Pfannberg, then in 1335 to the Sanneckers, who became known as the Counts of Cilli in 1341. Following their extinction in 1456, Cilli and its associated lordships passed to the Habsburgs in 1460.

== See also ==
- County of Cilli
