= Catherine of Bosnia, Countess of Cilli =

Princess of Bosnia

- Issue: Hermann II, Count of Celje

Catherine of Bosnia (Serbo-Croatian: Katarina Kotromanić, Slovene: Katarina Celjska - Kotromanićka) (fl. 14th century) was a Bosnian noblewoman. She was Countess of Cilli by her marriage to Hermann I, Count of Cilli, and a member of the House of Kotromanić by birth.

== Family ==
It is known that Catherine was of Bosnian origin, but her parentage is disputed. Some believe that Catherine was the daughter of Vladislav Kotromanić and his wife Jelena Šubić. Others believe she was the second daughter of Stephen II, Ban of Bosnia, and his third wife Elizabeth of Kuyavia. If Catherine was a daughter of Stephen, she was the sister of Queen Elizabeth of Hungary; if she was a daughter of Vladislav, she was sister of King Tvrtko I of Bosnia.

Catherine's parentage is not clear because there is no evidence to link Catherine to either of the couples.

== Marriage ==
Catherine was married in 1361 (or 1362) to Hermann I, Count of Cilli (Celje). The couple were married for twenty-three years and had at least two children:

1. Hans of Cilli, died young
2. Hermann II, Count of Cilli, married Countess Anna of Schaunberg and became father of Holy Roman Empress Barbara.
