= Barbara of Cilli =

Holy Roman Empress from 1433 to 1437

Barbara
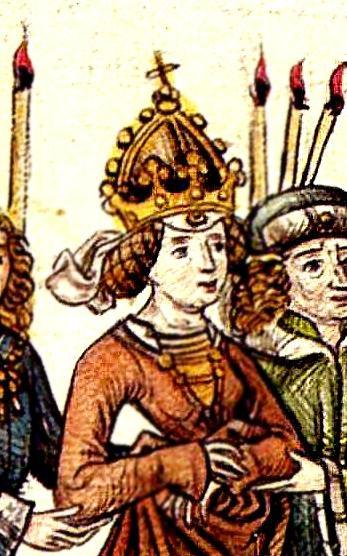

Queen consort of Hungary and Croatia
- Tenure: 1405–1437
- Coronation: 1408

Queen consort of the Romans
- Tenure: 1411–1437
- Coronation: 1414

Queen consort of Bohemia
- Tenure: 1419–1437
- Coronation: 1437

Holy Roman Empress
- Tenure: 1433–1437
- Coronation: 1433
- Born: 1392; Celje, County of Cilli (now Slovenia)
- Died: 11 July 1451 (aged 58–59); Mělník, Bohemia, Crown of Bohemia (now Czech Republic)
- Spouse: Sigismund, Holy Roman Emperor
- Issue: Elizabeth of Luxembourg
- House: House of Cilli
- Father: Herman II, Count of Celje
- Mother: Countess Anna of Schaunberg

Barbara of Cilli or Barbara of Celje (Hungarian: Cillei Borbála, German: Barbara von Cilli, Slovenian and Croatian: Barbara Celjska, 1392 – 11 July 1451), was the Holy Roman Empress and Queen of Hungary and Bohemia by marriage to Holy Roman Emperor Sigismund. She was actively involved in politics and economy of her times, independently administering large feudal fiefdoms and taxes, and was instrumental in creating the famous royal Order of the Dragon. She served as the regent of Hungarian kingdom in the absence of her husband four times: in 1412, 1414, 1416, and 1418.

== Biography ==
Barbara was born in Celje, in the Duchy of Styria (today Slovenia), as the daughter and youngest child of Herman II, Count of Celje, and his wife, Countess Anna of Schaunberg.

Barbara was engaged in 1405 to Sigismund of Luxembourg, King of Hungary, the youngest son of Charles IV, Holy Roman Emperor. The marriage likely took place in December 1405.

=== Queen and empress ===
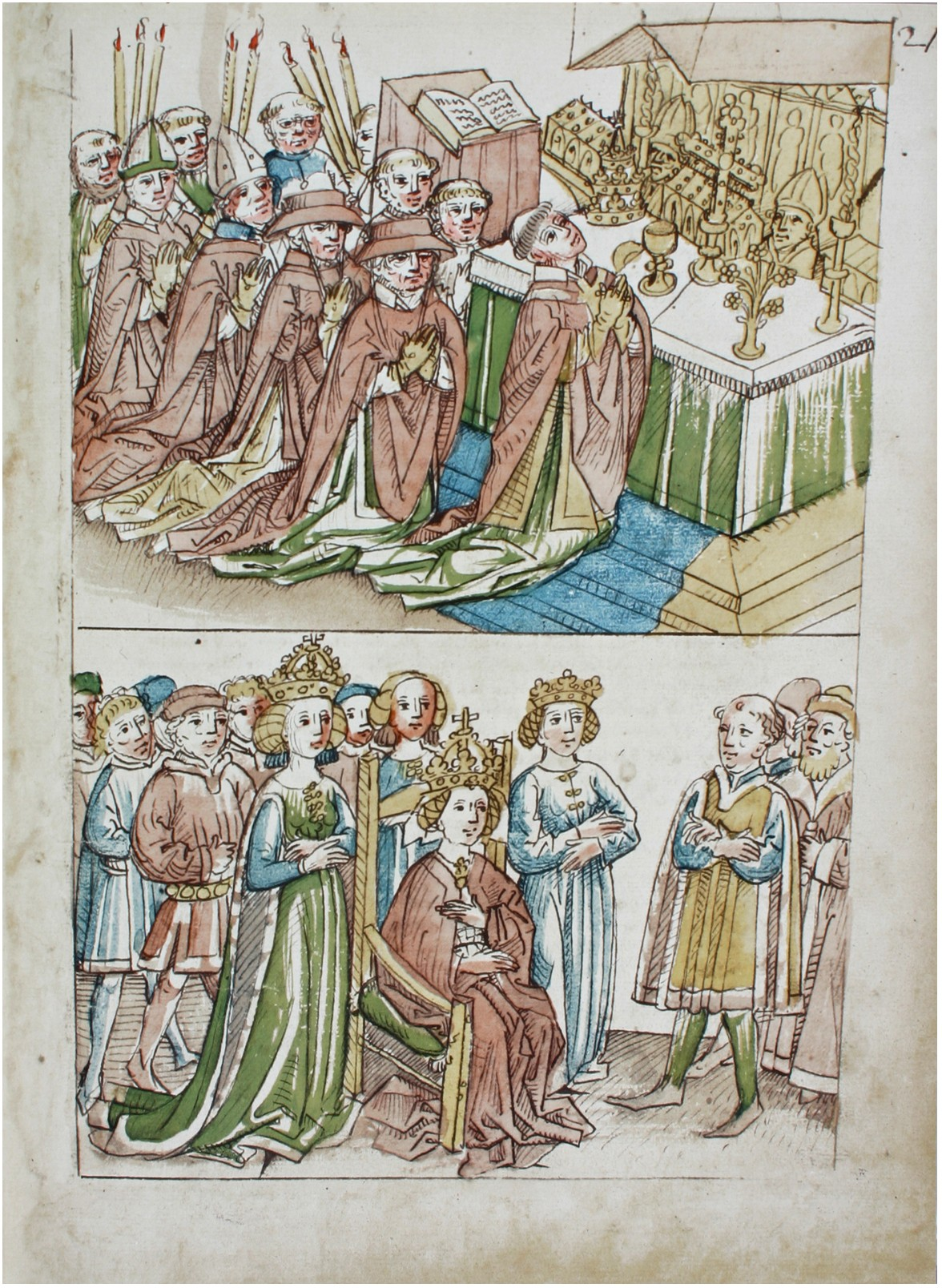
Barbara sits listening to mass, Ulrich of Richenthal: Das Konzil zu Konstanz

Sigismund succeeded to the rule in Germany (1410), Bohemia (1419) and was crowned Holy Roman Emperor himself in 1433, giving her the equivalent titles.

She spent most of her time on her Hungarian fiefdoms, while her spouse devoted his time elsewhere. She served as the regent of Hungary during his absences in 1412, 1414, 1416 and 1418. In 1429, she participated at the congress of Łuck. She was crowned Queen of Hungary in 1408, Queen of Germany in 1414 (being the last consort to be crowned in Aachen), Holy Roman Empress in 1433 and Queen of Bohemia in 1437, shortly before her husband's death. In 1409, Barbara gave birth to a daughter, Elizabeth, Sigismund's only surviving issue and heiress, who married King Albert II of Germany.

Barbara was richer than any precedent queen. In 1409, the former estates of the Ban of Slavonia was bestowed upon Barbara. She had a difficult phase though, when in 1419, rumours reached Sigismund that she had an affair with a German knight during his stay at Konstanz. The king took away the queen's possessions, dissolved her entourage and exiled her to Oradea. During the Christmas of 1419, Bishop George of Passau and Hofmeister Louis of Oettingen tried to arrange a reconciliation. Barbara fell on her knees begging for the king's forgiveness but Sigismund refused to listen, until the 10-year-old Elizabeth intervened on behalf of her mother. She was allowed to hold her own court again in 1423 only. In 1424, her husband lavishly compensated her for her lost estates. Barbara was given, among others, the counties of Zvolen and Trenčín, as well as the revenues of Kremnica. The northern estates mortgaged to her included: Diósgyőr in 1427, Liptov in 1430, part of the Stibor inheritance in 1434. Her household became slightly more modest than her previous one. A notable feature was that the highest offices were now occupied by simple knights, instead of illustrious barons, like what had happened in the time of the Angevin rulers and Mary.

She was an energetic regent who also functioned as the head military commander in the case the country was attacked. In 1431, Hungary was beleaguered by Hussite forces twice. During the second one, they even infringed on Barbara's fiefs, notably Liptov. In October, at her castle in Old Buda, she learned of the situation in Liptov and possibly also the occupation of the Likava Castle by the Hussites. She immediately instructed Kremnica to follow the lead of Hanns Wallenroth and sent a large force to relieve Liptov. In October, she moved to Vígľaš, where she organized the defence against the Hussites led by Messenpek and planned the reconquest of Likava Castle. On 13 October 1431, Barbara sent a letter to the city of Košice, in which she informed them about loss of Likava and gave the order that their military divisions should be incorporated to her army as soon as possible. After this under the command of her military commander and main chronicler Stefan Poharnok ("Stefan the Cupbearer"), the army undertook the reconquering of Likava Castle. According to Dvořáková, "the lack of sources do not permit us to determine when Barbara got Likava back, and whether a Hussite garrison operated for several years at Likava, as some historians assume.", but "It is possible that Barbara's energetic interventions allowed her to send a strong force to the Liptov region in a short time, causing the Hussites to leave the Liptov and return to the Turiec region and then head down the Nitra valley to the city of Nitra." On 24 October, again she wrote to Košice, procuring from them crossbows and arrows (that would be paid by one-thirtieth tax from her collectors) as well as asking them for gunpowder or at least sulphur in the case they did not have it.

Barbara took an ambivalent position towards the Hussites. At first she attacked them vigorously in a manifesto published in July 1427 and in another published in October 1431. But in her later days, she worked behind the scenes to support the Hussite champion George Podiebrad.

There are about 250 extant charters issued in her name between 1406 and 1438 and now kept at The Hungarian National Archives preserved.

Mark Whelan notes that as the Roman queen, Barbara, through correspondence with Vienna or the Teutonic Order, was able to secure construction expertise (that she needed for her fortresses) from her German subjects, who provided a "far richer base of skills" than what she could find in the Hungarian kingdom. This seemed to be the result of what she saw in a travel to Vienna (she likely accompanied Sigismund to a Reichstag held in Vienna). She also accompanied Sigismund to the imperial diets held in Breslau (1420), Nuremberg (1422) and to Pressburg (1429). She took on her role as the first lady of Europe in the Council of Constance (1414), performing ceremonial duties. She is remembered by many contemporaries as the emperor's young, vital and beautiful consort. Her liberal behaviours, encouraged by her husband, provoked protests from moralists though. Jean de Montreuil, secretary of the French King (who hated Sigismund), wrote that, "Nowhere in the world is a more indulgent husband (than Sigismund), who not only lets his wife do anything she wants, but ultimately even encourages her to take part in public dances, speak with everyone and relate to people in such a friendly way that it is said that those who do not know her (personally) would not consider her as a queen but as a woman of some low trade." He was especially shocked that "merchant's wives, various bawds, and people without important positions" came to see the queen and left her apartment freely, in a way impossible in the French court.

==== Founding of the Order of the Dragon ====
On 12 December 1408, the ruling couple together with twenty-two of the leading barons founded the Order of the Dragon. Barbara was the co-publisher of the founding charter, in which she appeared as an equal partner to Sigismund and other founders. The proclaimed purpose of the Order was to support the ruling couple, elevate the dignity of the Hungarian king as well as to combat pagans. According to Dvořáková, "members of the order were bound to defend the queen and her children of both sexes in their domain and properties, even in the event of the king's death. Several of Barbara's relatives were among the founding members of the order: aside from her father Hermann, also her brother Frederick of Cilli, her brother-in-law Nicholas of Gara with his son John, who had an interest in keeping power in the hands of Barbara and her potential offspring even after the death of Sigismund."

=== Conflict with Albert II ===
Days before the death of her gravely ill husband on 9 December 1437 at Znojmo, as a pretext to confiscate her large fiefdoms in the Hungarian kingdom (where she rivaled the king himself in number of fiefdoms and castles), she was quickly accused by her son-in-law Albert II of Germany of the Habsburg dynasty and his chancellor Kaspar Schlick of plotting against Sigismund, for which she was swiftly transported to prison in Bratislava castle and later forced to relinquish most of her possessions, including her dower. Conflict with the new king was inevitable, and Barbara soon decided to find shelter in the Polish royal court, where she was in exile from 1438 to 1441. The King of Poland decided to give her financial support by granting her Sandomierz as a fief, according to the chronicle of Jan Długosz.

=== Later life ===
In 1441, two years after the death of her arch-rival King Albert II of Germany, she moved to Mělník in Bohemia – a fiefdom given to her by her deceased husband. All her Hungarian fiefdoms were already lost; some of them belonged to her daughter, Queen Elisabeth. Later she reconciled with her daughter and renounced her rights to Hungarian possessions (1441). She spent the rest of her life as dowager queen in Bohemia. She seems to have retreated from political life, although the Habsburg court saw her as dangerous and tried to accuse her of heresy, alchemy, and immoral and agnostic behavior, for which she received the sobriquet "Messalina of Germany". She died of the plague epidemic in Mělník and was buried in St. Andrew's chapel of St. Vitus Cathedral in Prague.

== Cultural depictions ==
Recently, scholarly interest in Barbara's life and career has been increasing. Modern portrayals tend to show the late medieval ruler in a much more positive light than medieval writings. Historians pay more attention to her independent character, her notable political achievements, her shrewd administrative of her property, her versatile nature (she spoke several languages and was a practicing alchemist).

=== Historiography ===
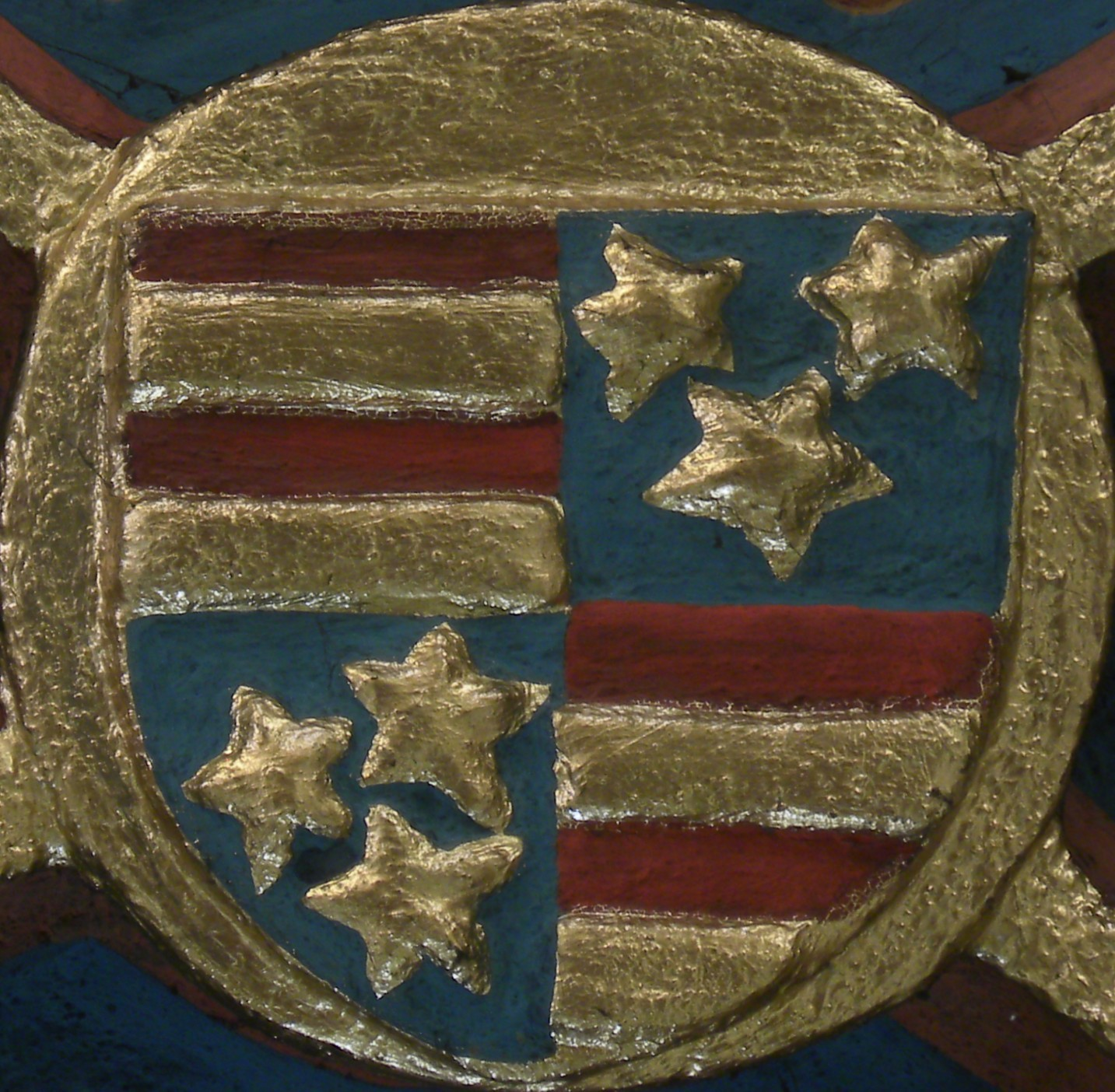
Coat of arms of Barbara Celjska (Barbara of Cilli). Parish church in Prievidza, Slovakia. Boss of the rib vault.

==== Barbara's personality ====
Late medieval and early modern scholars often presented the empress in a bad light, highlighting her sexual deviancy. Daniela Dvořáková opines that the major creator of this negative image was Aeneas Silvius Piccolomini, later Pope Pius II, who hated the Cillis and also worked for Holy Roman Emperor Frederick III, who also harboured enmity towards the Cillis (in 1436, Sigismund raised the Cillis, who had been vassals to the Habsburgs, to princes, without the consent of Frederick, who was at that time Duke Frederick V of Austria). Later, the historian Johannes Cuspinian (1473–1529) further developed the sensual, negative image created by Piccolomini. Cuspinian was the first author who compared Barbara with the Roman empress Messalina. Later, Johann Jakob Fugger (1516–1575) associated Barbara with the enduring label "the German Messalina" (Teutsche Messalina)

Barbara returned as the focus of biographical research through two early Leipzig dissertation in 1755 and 1759. In 1908, Hans von Chilian, again in Leipzig, published the dissertation Barbara von Cilli, in which the queen-empress was recognized as a brilliantly gifted individual. Recently, together with the extraordinary development of research on Sigismund, more attention has also been paid to Barbara.

Recent research, such as those of Rolanda Fugger Germadnik ("the leading Slovene expert on Barbara of Cilli") or Daniela Dvořáková, aims at clearing the queen's name of the old disreputable accusations. She is now presented as an early emancipated, energetic, self-confident woman of profound education, who has been demonized unfairly.

==== Barbara as a politician ====
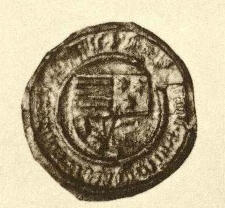
Barbara's seal

Dvořáková opines that Barbara "ranks among the most fascinating female historical figures of the first half of the 15th century", although until now she has been in the shadow of her more celebrated husband. According to the researcher, "The cohabitation of Sigismund and Barbara was built not only on affection or even love, but also on their mutually beneficial cooperation. Thanks to her wealth, multiplied by good management, a well-thought-through financial policy, as well as the choice of capable people, the queen always had money available, which her husband always needed. Due to his absolute occupation in politics, he did not have the capacity to devote himself to the administration of his own properties." By the end of her husband's reign, she held 30 castles, equal to the number held by the king, while the Cilli counts held 17. Dvořáková opines that Barbara's imprisonment after or shortly before the death of Sigismund was either without her husband's knowledge or manipulation of the dying Sigismund, likely on behalf of her son-in-law, King Albert of Austria. Dvořáková points out that it was the inevitable fate of self-confident queens, without the protection of their husbands, to end up badly in that era – which can be seen in the cases of Elizabeth of Bosnia, widow of Louis I the Great; Barbara's daughter Elizabeth of Luxembourg or Beatrice of Naples, widow of Matthias Corvinus. Machilek praises Dvořáková's work for successfully portraying Barbara as a gifted, self-confident ruler who displayed a non-conformist attitude in her widowhood.

Sandra B. Weiss notes that Barbara relied especially upon her mountain (mining) estates (in 1427, Sigismund gave up on his rights on the mining tax for gold, silver, iron, and lead – except copper – in all mining towns, in exchange for the thirtieth tariff) to build her authority and even oppose Sigismund's will, which led to her eventual imprisonment.

According Philip J. Potter, Barbara was instrumental in the founding of the Order of the Dragon. She used her dynasty's prestige to promote the Order's standing.

Ansgar Frenken remarks that the queen is now "expressly honored as an independent political subject and her political role as Hungarian regent as well as administrator of her own properties is emphasized."

Kondor notes that Barbara's organizational skills are now widely recognized by scholars. Jörg K. Hoensch though does point out that during the period of 1416–1419, when Barbara was forced to govern alone without the other two members (Garai and Kanizsai) of the regency council (Regentschaftsrat) that Sigismund appointed when he left Hungary, she was unable to cope with the situation. Chilian also notes the various problems with the defense against the Ottomans, other border incidents and armed robberies Hungary had in this period. Fößel argues though that these incidents were either not indicators of success in ruling the country or not acute problems during that period. Martin Uhrmacher praises Amalie Fößel's article Barbara von Cilli. Gemahlin Sigismunds und ungarische Königin for an updated portrait, in which the author defends the queen from clichés but does not leave the ruling couple's action uncriticized.

On the turbulent events happened before and after Sigismund's death, Roitner opines that it is hard to determine who was the person that ordered Barbara's arrest as well as her specific ambitions during that period.

==== Barbara and the occult ====
Barbara is recognized as a practicing alchemist and astrologer. Her involvement in the occult has also contributed to her reputation as a godless, dangerous woman. Hermann Schelenz's 1904 Geschichte der Pharmazie ("History of pharmacy") describes the queen-empress as a fraudulent alchemist. According to Stanislav Južnič, Barbara – the richest female alchemist of all times – used very expensive but easily breakable tools for her experiments, thus today there is not much hope of obtaining a preserved specimen.

==== Books and articles ====
- Chilian, Hans (1908). Barbara von Cilli (in German). Noske. p. 74.
- Dvořáková, Daniela (2021). Barbara of Cilli (1392–1451) : a Hungarian, Holy Roman, and Bohemian queen. Leiden. ISBN 978-90-04-49916-4.

Review by Franz Machilek

- Kraljević, Sara Katanec (2014). The Perquisite of a Medieval Wedding: Barbara of Cilli's Acquisition of Wealth, Power, and Lands (MA). Budapest: Central European University.
- Krzenck, Thomas (1991). "Barbara von Cilli – eine "deutsche Messalina"" (PDF). Mitteilungen der Gesellschaft für Salzburger Landeskunde (131): 45–67.
- Roitner, Ingrid (2016). "Barbara von Cilli; Königin von Ungarn, römisch-deutsche Königin und Königin von Böhmen". BiografiA: Lexikon österreichischer Frauen (1. Aufl ed.). Wien. pp. 199–203. doi:10.7767/9783205793489-003. ISBN 978-3-205-79348-9.
- McNally, Raymond T. (2001). "In Search of the Lesbian Vampire: Barbara von Cilli, Le Fanu's "Carmilla" and the Dragon Order" (PDF). Journal of Dracula Studies. 3. doi:10.70013/d5e9w3x2.
- Amalie Fößel: Die Korrespondenz der Königin Barbara im ungarischen Staatsarchiv zu Budapest. In: Karel Hruza, Alexandra Kaar (Hrsg.): Kaiser Sigismund (1368–1437). Zur Herrschaftspraxis eines europäischen Monarchen (Forschungen zur Kaiser- und Papstgeschichte des Mittelalters; Bd. 31). Böhlau Verlag, Wien (u.a) 2012, ISBN 978-3-205-78755-6, S. 245–254. Digitalisat
- Ennen, Edith (1994). Frauen im Mittelalter (in German). C.H.Beck. ISBN 978-3-406-37799-0.
- Foerster, Anne (2018). Die Witwe des Königs zu Vorstellung, Anspruch und Performanz im englischen und deutschen Hochmittelalter. Ostfildern. ISBN 978-3799543767.
- Schelenz, Hermann (1904). Geschichte der Pharmazie (in German). J. Springer.
- Paušek-Baždar, Snježana (1 October 2008). "Königin Barbara zu Cilli als Alchimistin in Samobor". Godišnjak Njemačke narodnosne zajednice ... (in Croatian). 15 (1): 275–280. ISSN 1331-7172.
- Heinz Quirin (1953). "Barbara von Cilly". Neue Deutsche Biographie (in German). Vol. 1. Berlin: Duncker & Humblot. p. 581. (full text online).
- Franz von Krones (1875). "Barbara v. Cilli" . Allgemeine Deutsche Biographie (in German). Vol. 2. Leipzig: Duncker & Humblot. pp. 48–49.

=== Legends and anecdotes ===
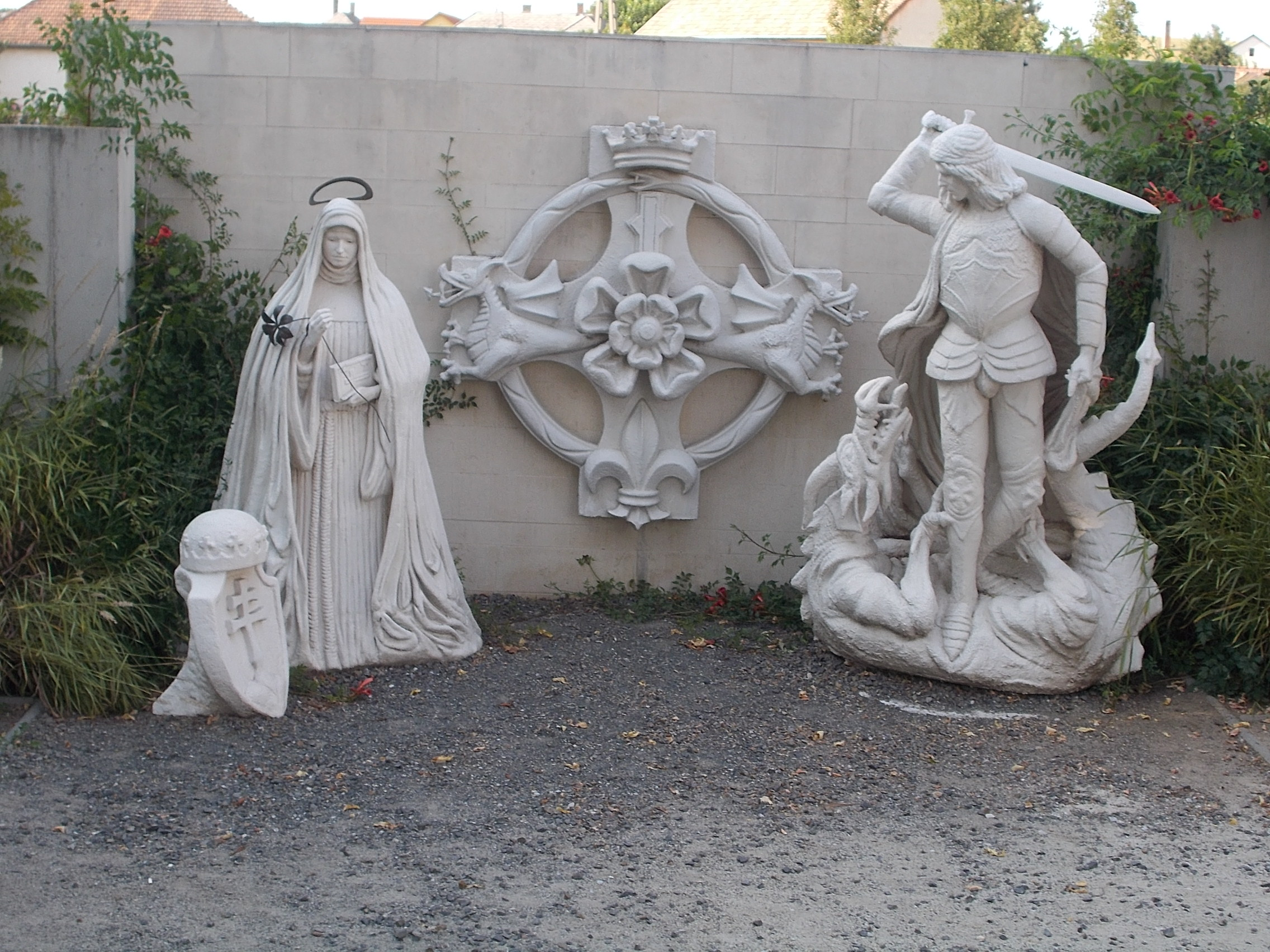
Barbara of Cilli and Sigismund statue, 2017 Nyírbátor.

In Croatian folklore, Barbara is often identified with the figure of the Black Queen. The black queen is described as a lady with long black hair, who dressed herself in black. There are dark legends about Black Queen-Barbara that are still widely known today, including:

- The queen had many lovers. When she did not like them anymore, she had them thrown over the wall of her castle.
- She was a bird-whisperer who kept a pet black raven that would attack people on her command.
- She asked the Devil to protect Medvedgrad against invading Turks, offering her own life to him. Later she tried to trick the devil but failed. A version recounts that she offered 12 buckets of gold to anyone who could bring her around the fortress of Medvedgrad twelve times. But nobody managed to do this due to all the hidden traps around the fortress. She was turned into a snake. But once every hundred years, on a certain day, it is possible for a man who, if he encounters her in the form of a snake, to remove the curse by a kiss.

Barbara supposedly had many lovers. Dvořáková says that these adultery stories are based on very shaky ground. For example, the German knight Johannes de Wallenroth (whose involvement with Barbara is written down by the Bavarian historian Enoch Widmann, who lived two centuries after Barbara) actually served in her court and possibly later boasted about the queen's favour when he retired to Germany, but it is hard to imagine that Sigismund would tolerate him to the degree that he could continue to work for her many years after the alleged uncovering of infidelity.

She has even been portrayed as a lesbian vampire – a beautiful (one of the traits older chroniclers and historians agreed about her) but nefarious creature. She allegedly kept a female harem during her exile in Melnyk and had orgies with young girls. The vampiristic stories originated at least partly from Piccolomini's account, which claims that, after the death of Albrecht, Barbara (who did not believe in the afterlife according to Piccolomini) and Elizabeth used to desecrate the Holy Communion by drinking real human blood. This would, even by modern medical standards, qualify Barbara as a "living vampire" (a person who drinks human blood). McNally comments that, "So, how can one evaluate the role of Barbara von Cilli? During a time when royalty in both western and eastern Europe could barely sign their names, Barbara knew German, Hungarian, Czech, Latin, and even a little Polish. She lived a comparatively free life in the manner of the Italian Renaissance with emphasis upon individual freedom. In fact, Barbara appears to have been an early example of an emancipated woman, who probably frightened her male contemporaries and led to her nefarious reputation as a lesbian vampire."

=== Depictions in arts ===
==== Contemporary arts ====
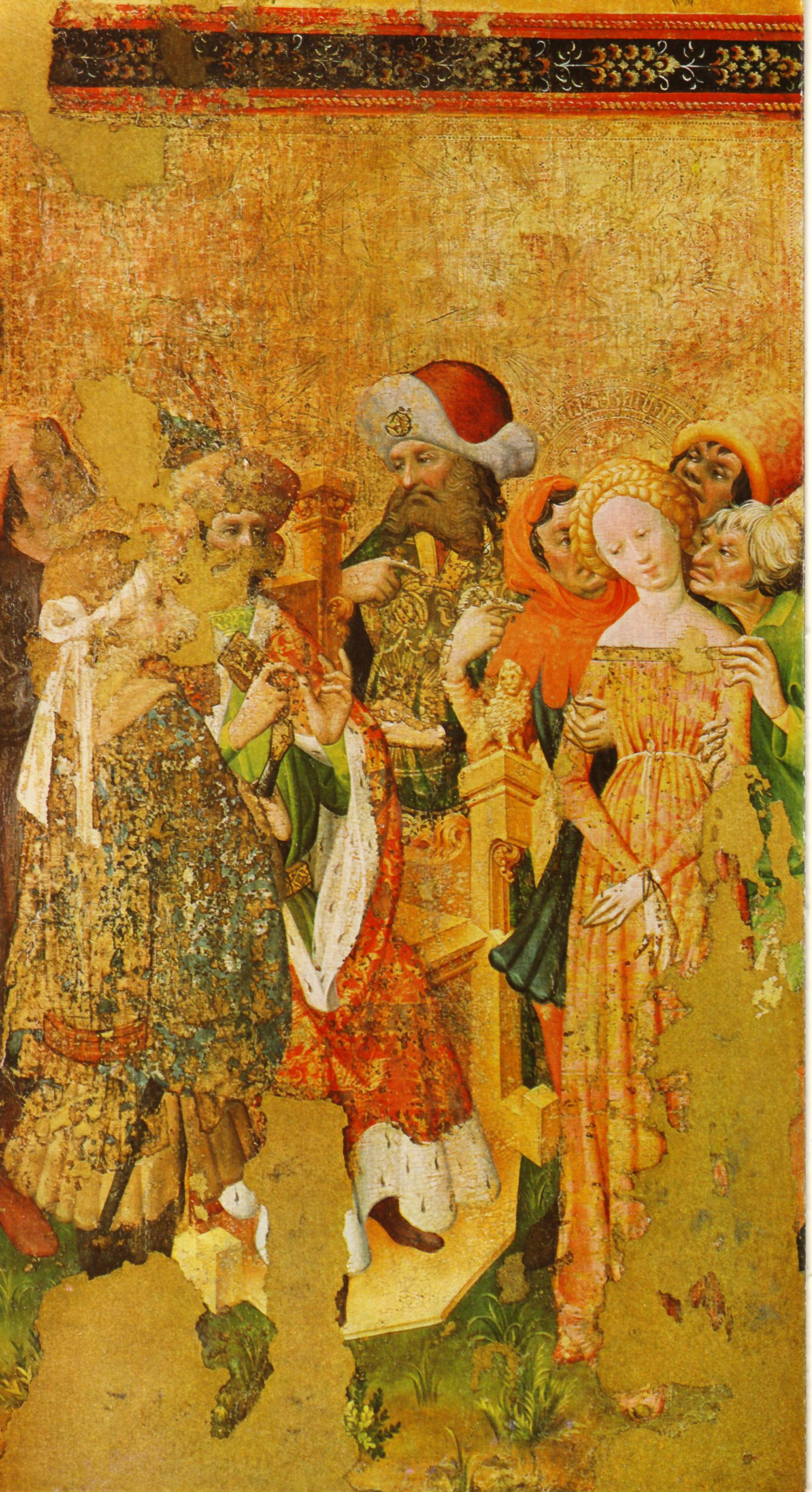
Altarpiece from Kalanti, a Finnish village (Nykyrko in Swedish). Barbara is possibly shown as Saint Barbara while Sigismund is with his characteristic fur hat.

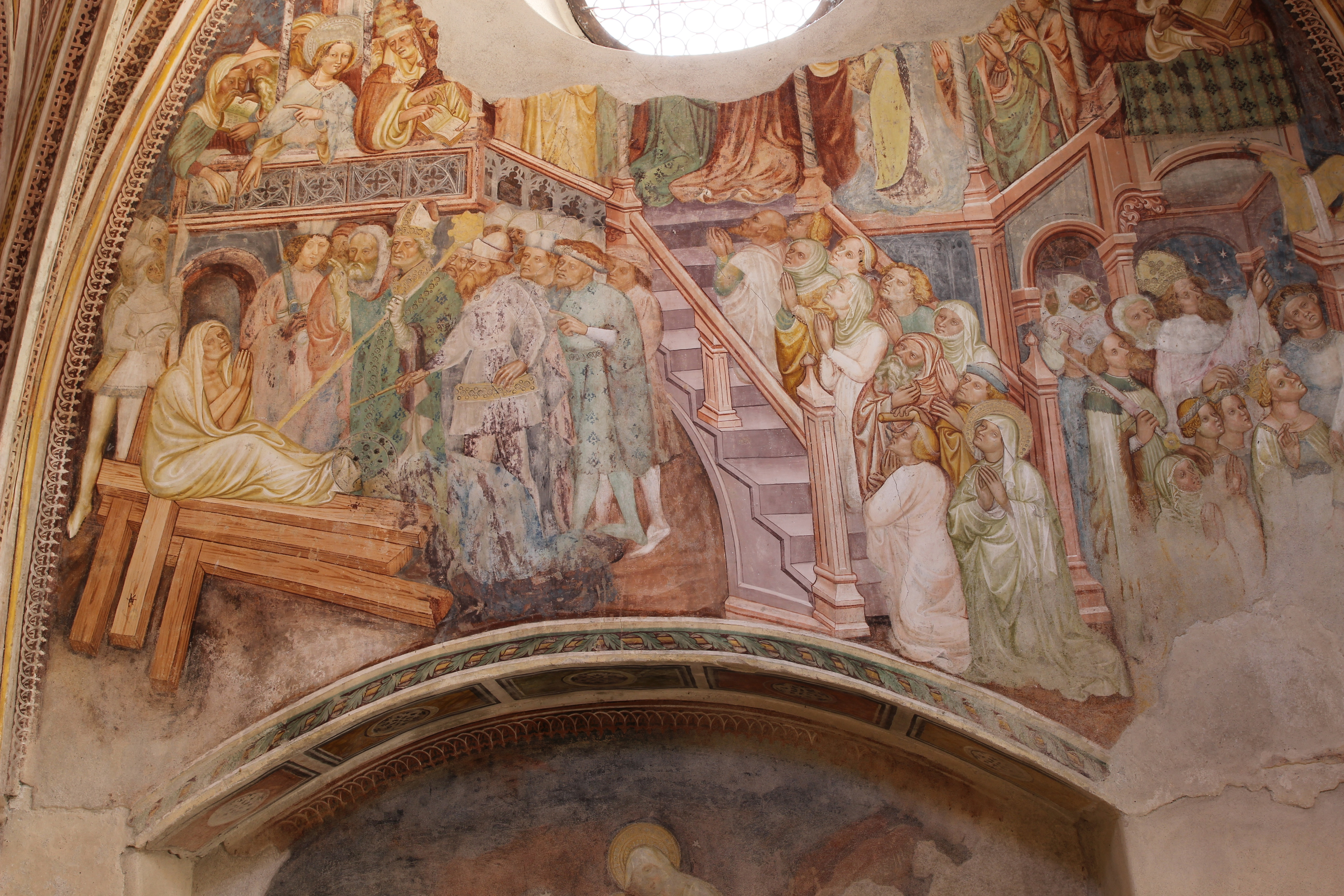
Fresco depicting the scene of Saint Helena's discovery of the True Cross at the Cemetery Chapel at the parish church of Our Lady of Sorrows in Riffian (South Tyrol). Barbara is likely depicted as the kneeling queen (with the same hairstyle as Saint Barbara of Kalanti – a plait wrapping around her head.

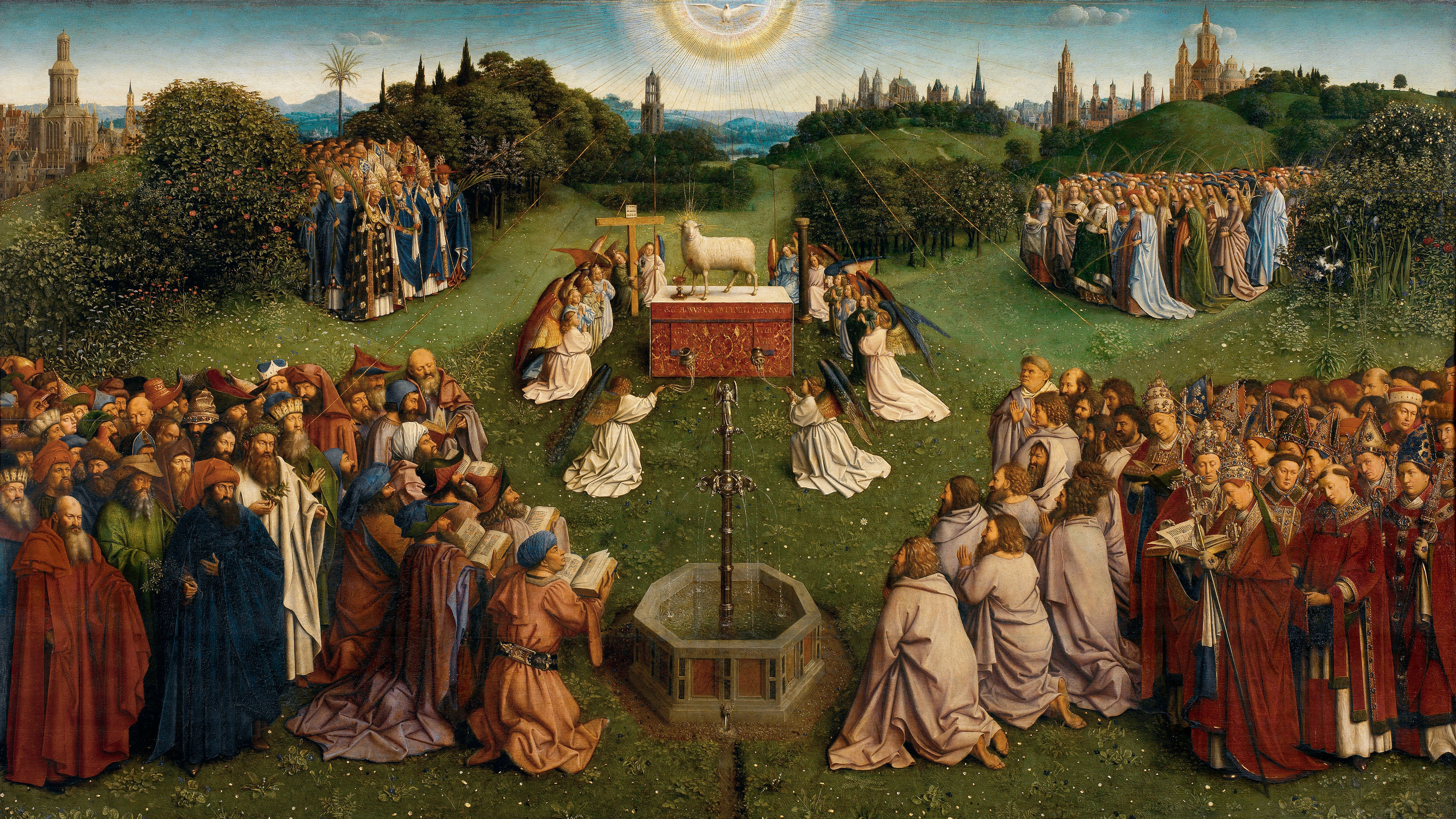
The Adoration of the Lamb scene in the Ghent Altarpiece. The leader of the female martyrs (top right) is possibly another crypto portrait of the queen.

- She was present in the Reminiscences of Helene Kottanner, a lady-in-waiting to Barbara's daughter Queen Elizabeth and one of the first known female memoirist.

==== Later depictions ====
===== Visual art =====
- Slovenian artist Rudolf Španzel created a depiction of hers.
- In 2020, Renáta Fučíková pays tribute to Barbara with an illustration in a series about Czech heroines.

===== Prose =====
- In 1941, Ján Greža wrote the novel Barbora Cellská about Barbara.
- She is a character in Das Lächeln der Imperia by Antje Windgassen. The main character is Gabriella Cognati, a courtesan who calls herself Imperia and is the mistress of Sigismund. The relationship between Barbara and Gabriella is friendly. The story is tied to the 1414 Council of Constance.
- Mircalla, Countess Karnstein (the female vampire Carmilla), the title character of Carmilla, a 1872 Gothic novella by Sheridan Le Fanu, is likely based on the legendary image of Barbara as a vampire.
- Barbara is featured as the main character in the wraparound narrative of the story collection Waggish Tales of the Czechs. Referred to as "Queen Barbota," Barbara is portrayed as a somewhat ribald character who, bedridden and bored during her pregnancy, engages her women-in-waiting in telling her moral tales. According to the book's foreword, these are "lusty, uproarious, sometimes cruelly brutal yarns, recited with the coarse gusto and abounding virility of a healthy outdoor people". Queen Barbota takes great delight in them.
- In August 2023, the German horror fiction author Markus Heitz will publish the novel Die Schwarze Königin. The story is about a young man named Len (a Drăculești and the last descendant of Vlad II Dracul) going to Prague and Banat, assisted by his friend Klara (an ex-history professor) via the internet. He comes into contact with the world of the past, in which Barbara von Cilli and Vlad II fought against vampires living underground in Transylvania and Wallachia.
- Barbara of Cili is one of the main characters in The Whirlwind of Time, book one of The Whirlwind Trilogy, by the Croatian author of historical fiction, Ivana Julius.

===== Theatre =====
- Václav Renč wrote the 1944 four-act drama Barbora Celská.

===== Films =====
- In the 1986 Czechoslovak television film Zikmund řecený Šelma rysavá, the queen-empress is portrayed by Milena Dvorská.

=== Commemoration ===
In 2014 (the 600th Anniversary of the Council of Constance and Barbara's coronation as Queen of Germany), the Provincial Museum of Celje organized the Year of Barbara of Cilli. Also in 2014, a €2 commemorative coin depicting the queen hold a sceptre was issued on behalf of Slovenia, designed by Matej Ramšak.

On 19 November and 10 December 2022, Konstanz will organize the event Barbara von Cilli – Kaiserin, Alchemistin, Vampir.

== Gallery ==
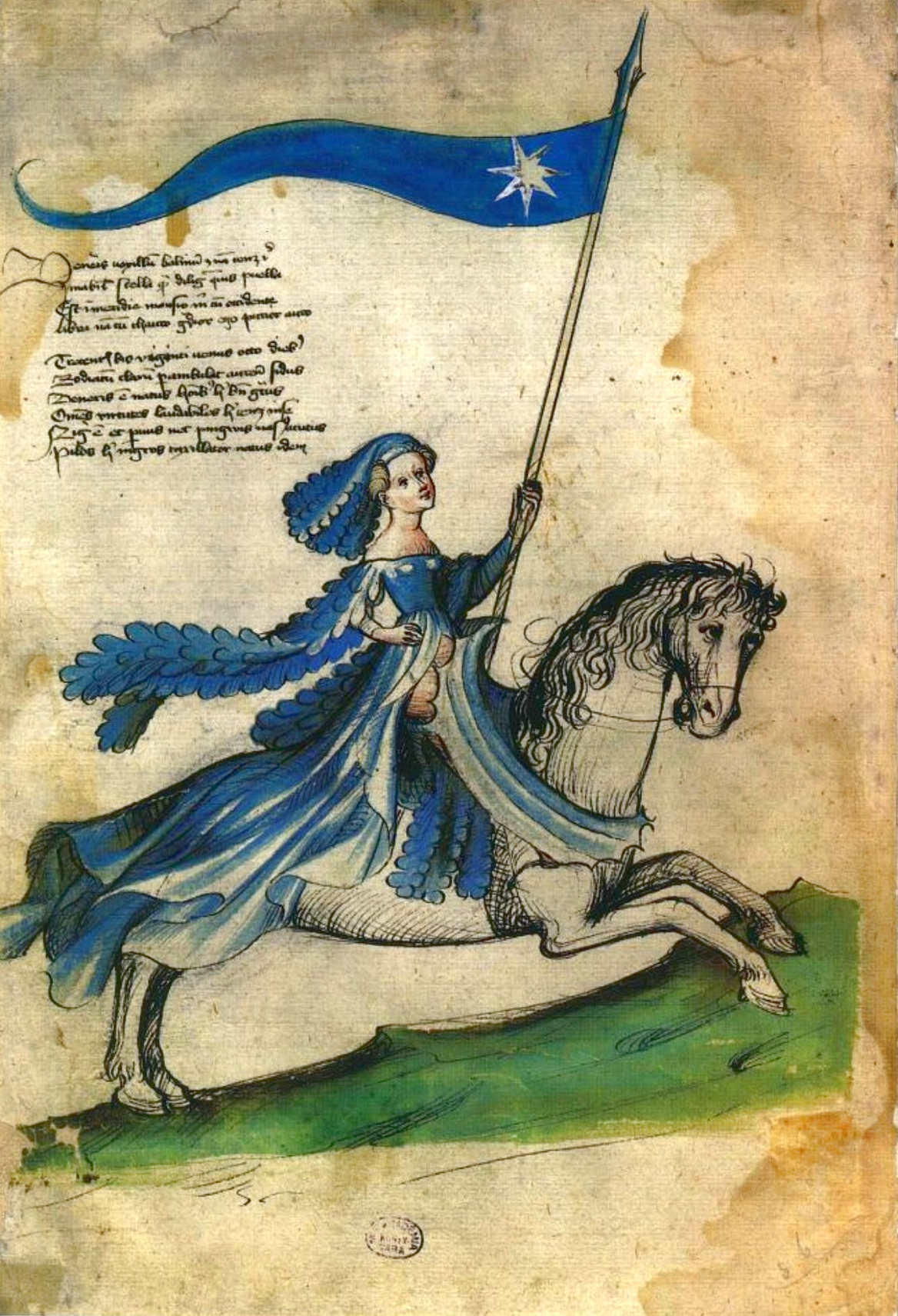
Barbara of Cilli as Venus, "Liber de septem signis", in Konrad Kyeser's Bellifortis (around first half of the fifteenth century)

Barbara at the Council of Constance

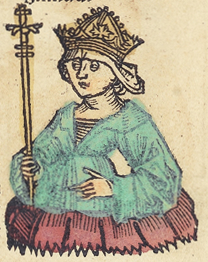
Woodcut from the Nuremberg Chronicle (Latin copy in São Paulo)

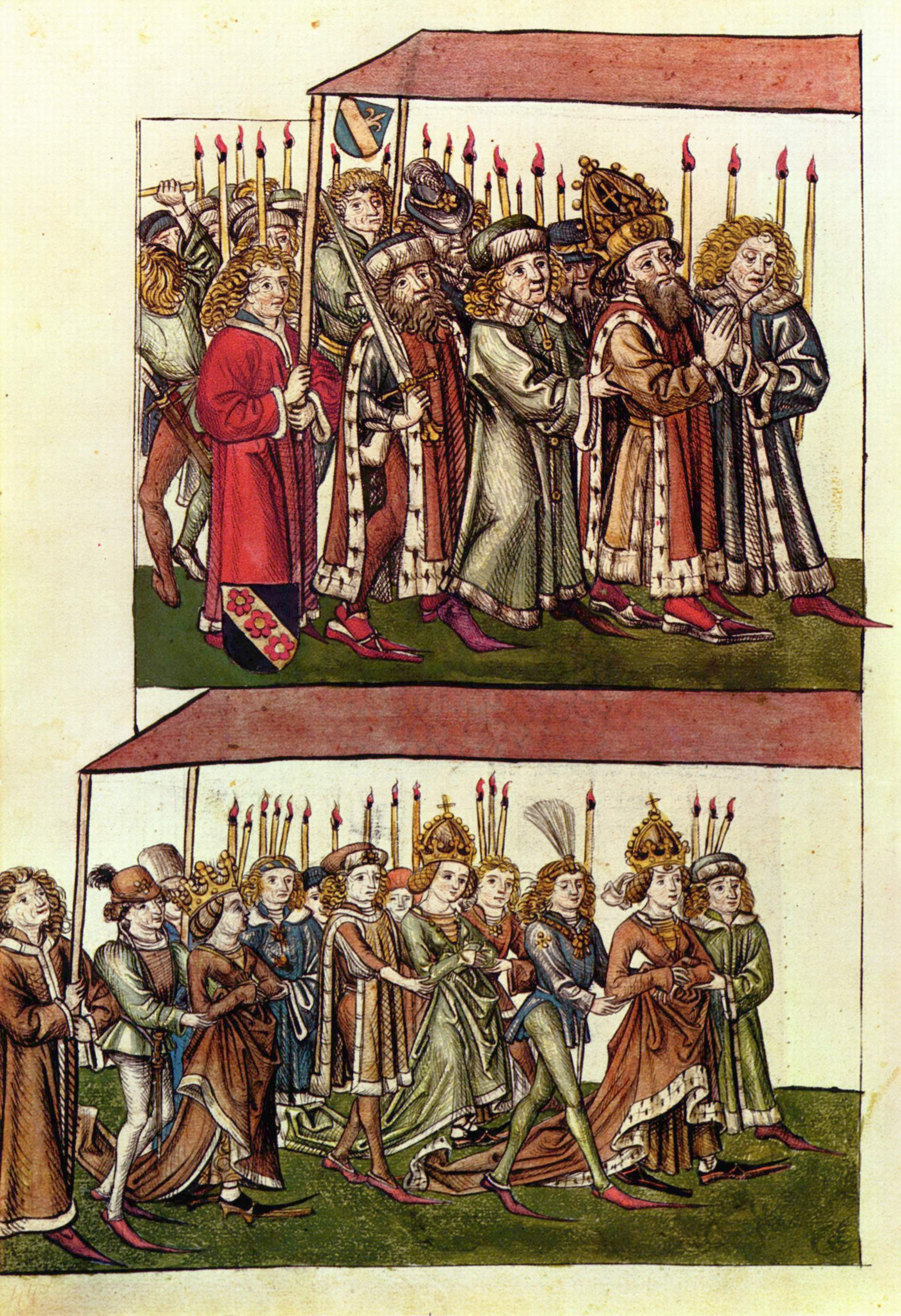
Master of the Council of Constance Chronicle – ceremonial entry of emperor Sigismund and empress Barbara.

Royal titles
Preceded by Elizabeth of Pomerania	Holy Roman Empress; 1433–1437	Succeeded by Eleanor of Portugal
Preceded by Elisabeth of Nuremberg	Queen consort of Germany; 1411–1437	Succeeded by Elizabeth of Luxembourg
Preceded by Sofia of Bavaria	Queen consort of Bohemia; 1419–1437	Succeeded by Elizabeth of Luxembourg
Preceded by Margaret of Durazzo	Queen consort of Hungary; 1405–1437	Succeeded by Elizabeth of Luxembourg
