= Herrand von Wildonie =

German nobleman and poet

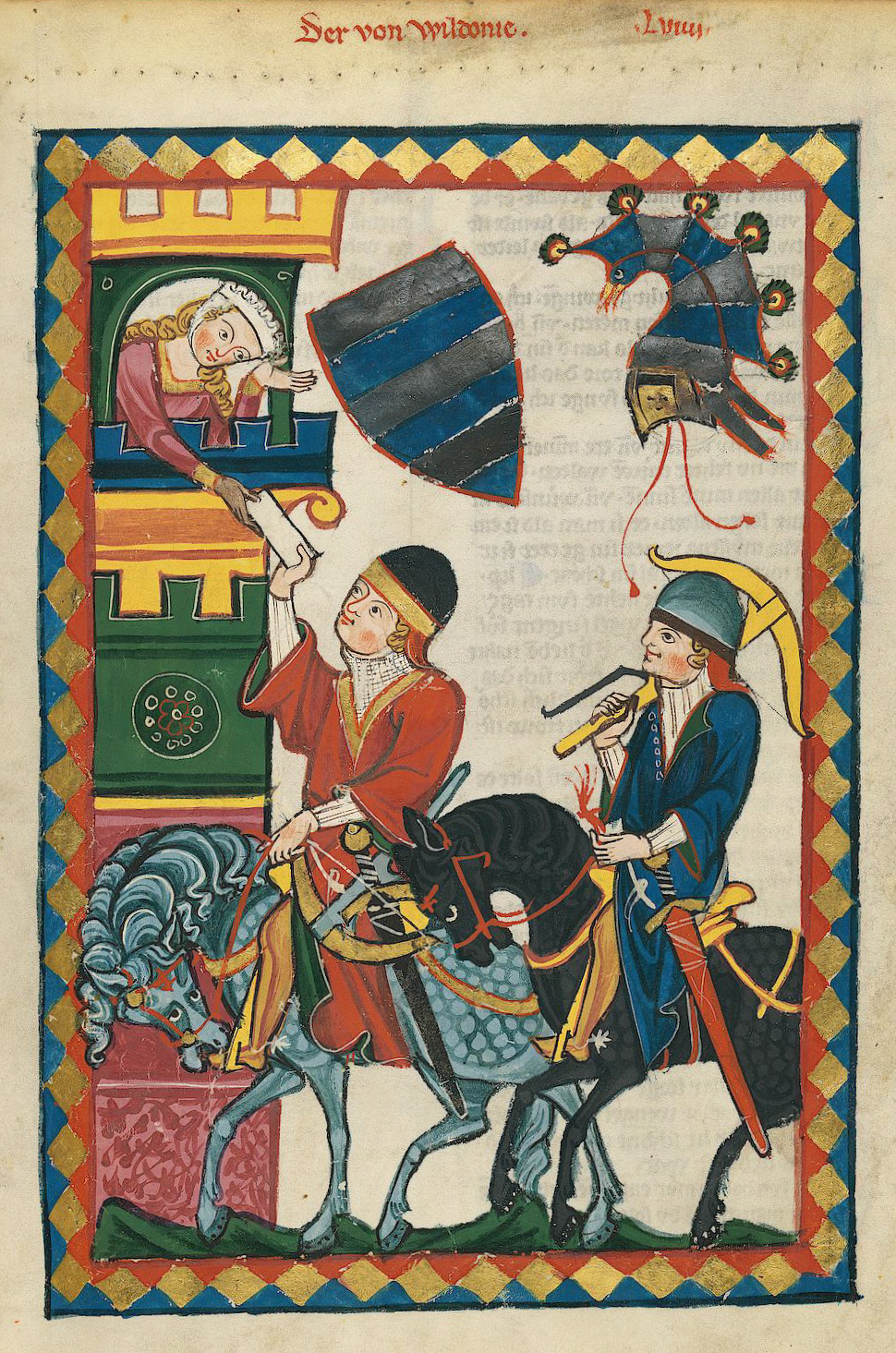
In this illustration from the Codex Manesse, Herrand is handing some of his verse to a lady in a castle. He and his companion are dressed and armed for hunting.

Herrand von Wildonie (fl. 1248–1278) was a German nobleman and poet.

== Life ==
Herrand was born around 1230. He belonged to an important noble family that held the hereditary office of high steward in the Duchy of Styria. The family's castle, now in ruins, was Alt Wildon. His father, Ulrich (fl. 1219–1262), was the standard-bearer at the battle of Kressenbrunn in 1260. His mother's name is unknown. Herrand is numbered Herrand II after his grandfather, Herrand I, who died around 1222. Sometime before 1260, Herrand married Perhta (or Perchta), a daughter of the poet Ulrich von Lichtenstein. They had two sons, Ulrich von Eppenstein and Herrand III von Wildonie.

Herrand was involved in the War of the Babenberg Succession that followed the death of the last Babenberg Duke of Austria in 1246. His activities can be traced in numerous surviving documents and the chronicle of Ottokar aus der Gaal. He entered the service of King Béla IV of Hungary in 1249, before joining King Ottokar II of Bohemia in 1254. In 1268, he was temporarily imprisoned by Ottokar. In 1276, he entered the service of King Rudolf I of Germany. He was recorded alive for the last time in 1278 when, after Rudolf's victory in the battle on the Marchfeld, he attended the king's court in Vienna. He was dead by 1282.

== Works ==
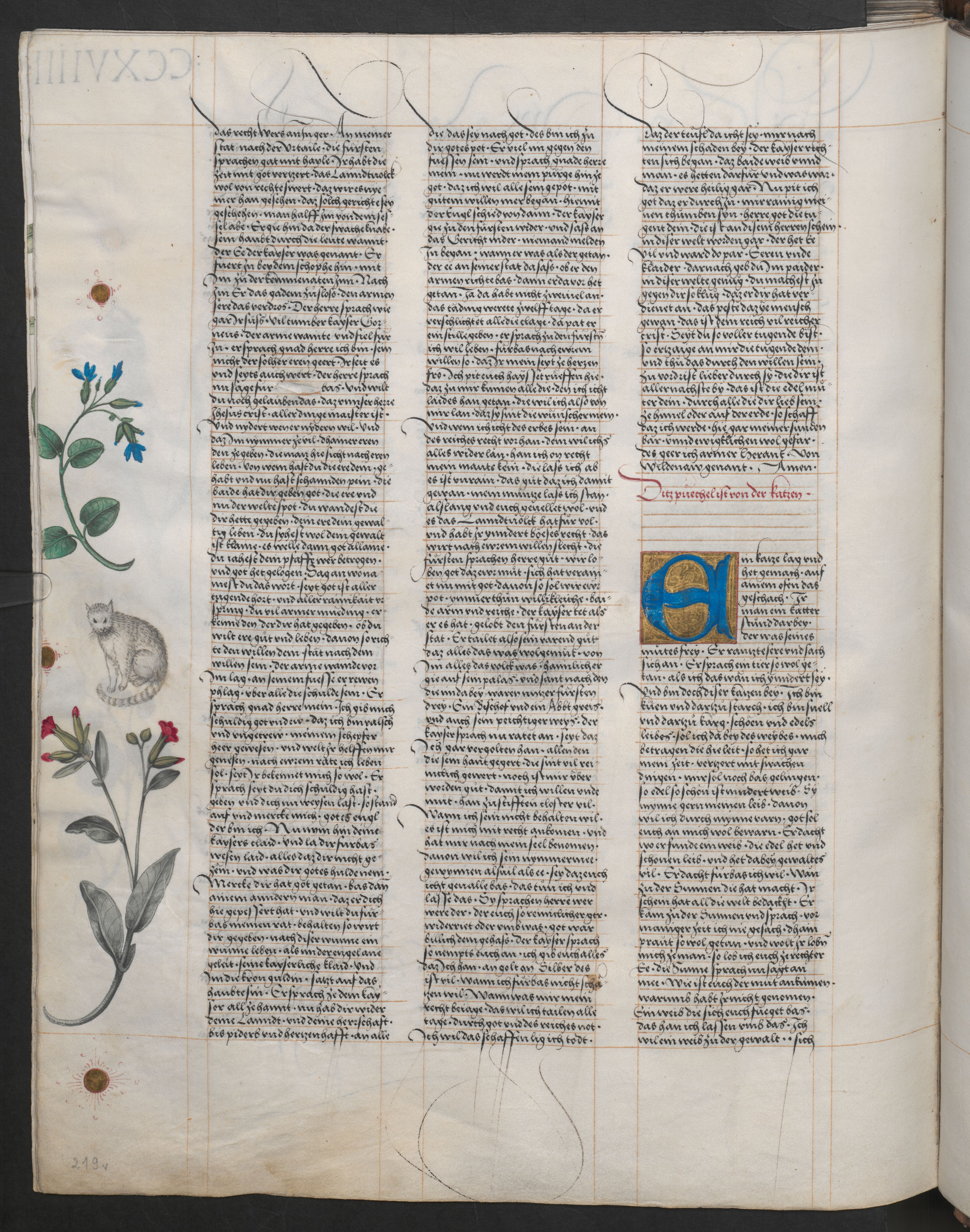
The Cat, from the Ambraser Heldenbuch, with a marginal drawing of a cat

Herrand's surviving works consist of four short narrative poems and the lyrics of three songs in the Minnesang tradition. The narrative poems are:

- Diu getriu kone (The Faithful Wife)
- Der verkêrte wirt (The Deceived Husband)
- Von dem blôzen keiser (The Naked Emperor)
- Von der katzen (The Cat)

The songs are:

- Lieber sumer (Lovely Summer)
- Des meien zît (The Maytime)
- Wir suln hôhen muot empfâhen (We Must All be Light of Heart)

== Bibliography ==
- Classen, Albrecht (2010). "Herrand von Wildonie". In Robert E. Bjork (ed.). The Oxford Dictionary of the Middle Ages. Oxford University Press. ISBN 978-0-19-866262-4.
- Curschmann, Michael (1969). "Herrand von Wildon". Neue Deutsche Biographie. Vol. 8. Duncker & Humblot. pp. 681–682.
- Curschmann, Michael (1981). "Herrand von Wildonie (Wildon)". In K. Ruh; G. Keil; W. Schröder (eds.). Die deutsche Literatur des Mittelalters. Verfasserlexikon. Vol. 3. Walter De Gruyter. pp. 1144–1147. ISBN 978-3-11-022248-7.
- Garland, Henry; Garland, Mary, eds. (2005). "Herrand von Wildonie". The Oxford Companion to German Literature (3rd ed.). Oxford University Press. ISBN 978-0-19-815896-7.
- Gibbs, Marion E.; Johnson, Sidney M. (2002) [1997]. Medieval German Literature. Routledge.
- Margetts, John (2001). "Herrand von Wildonie". In John M. Jeep (ed.). Medieval Germany: An Encyclopedia. Garland. pp. 356–357.
- Müller, Ulrich; Spechtler, Franz Viktor (2006). "Ulrich von Liechtenstein". In Will Hasty (ed.). German Literature of the High Middle Ages. Camden House. pp. 235–242.
- Thomas, J. W., ed. (1972). The Tales and Songs of Herrand von Wildonie: Translated into English Verse with an Introduction. University Press of Kentucky. ISBN 9780813112671.
