= Battle of the Leitha River =

Battle in 1246 in Europe

Coordinates: 47°44′12″N 16°13′49″E

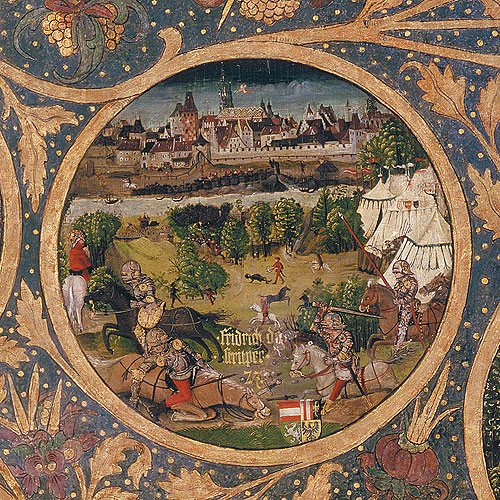
- Frederick II's death at the battle of the Leitha River. From Hans Part's Babenberg Pedigree in Klosterneuburg Monastery, c. 1489–1492
Date	15 June 1246
Location	banks of the Leitha river
Result	Austrian victory

Belligerents
Duchy of Austria	Kingdom of Hungary

Commanders and leaders
Frederick II of Babenberg †	Béla IV of the House of Árpád; Roland I Rátót

Strength
Fewer than the Hungarians	Greater than the Austrians

Casualties and losses
Unknown	Unknown

The Battle of the Leitha River was fought on 15 June 1246 near the banks of the Leitha river between the forces of the King Béla IV of Hungary and Duke Frederick II of Austria. The Hungarian army was routed, but Duke Frederick was killed, ending Austrian claims to the western counties of Hungary. Its exact location is unknown; according to the description delivered by contemporary minnesinger Ulrich von Liechtenstein the battlefield may have been between the towns of Ebenfurth and Neufeld.

Towards the end of the tenth century, in the reign of Géza, the River Leitha came to be seen as the boundary between Hungary and the German lands. The territories west of the Leitha were incorporated as the March of Styria into the Holy Roman Empire. In 1180 Emperor Frederick Barbarossa raised the Styrian lands to a duchy, which in 1192 was acquired by the Austrian dukes from the House of Babenberg.

Since 1241 the Hungarian kingdom suffered heavy losses in the course of the Mongol invasion of Europe, culminating in the disastrous Battle of Mohi. The Babenberg duke Frederick II, haughty and overambitious, made use of this weakness, attacked Hungary and claimed the western comitati of Moson, Sopron and Vas. The Hungarian King Béla IV of the House of Árpád however was able to make a stand against the Austrian invasion: Supported by the liensmen of his son-in-law Prince Rostislav Mikhailovich he gathered his troops and marched against Frederick's forces, which were challenged at the Leitha and the Duke himself was killed on the battlefield.

The battle marked the end of the ruling House of Babenberg and sparked another conflict, the War of the Babenberg Succession over the vacated Imperial fiefs of Austria and Styria between Árpád Hungary and the Bohemian king Ottokar II, leading to the Battle of Kressenbrunn in 1260 and the Battle on the Marchfeld in 1278. The Leitha river remained the borderline between Austria and Hungary (Cis- and Transleithania) until 1918.

== Bibliography ==
Heide Dienst: Die Schlacht an der Leitha 1246 (= Militärhistorische Schriftenreihe, Vol. 19). Österreichischer Bundesverlag, Vienna 1971, ISBN 3-215-02786-0 (in German)

- Érszegi, Géza; Solymosi, László (1981). "Az Árpádok királysága, 1000–1301 [The Monarchy of the Árpáds, 1000–1301]". In Solymosi, László (ed.). Magyarország történeti kronológiája, I: a kezdetektől 1526-ig [Historical Chronology of Hungary, Volume I: From the Beginning to 1526] (in Hungarian). Akadémiai Kiadó. pp. 79–187. ISBN 963-05-2661-1.
- Žemlička, Josef (2011). "The Realm of Přemysl Ottokar II and Wenceslas II". In Pánek, Jaroslav; Tůma, Oldřich (eds.). A History of the Czech Lands. Charles University in Prague. pp. 106–116. ISBN 978-80-246-1645-2.
