= War of the Babenberg Succession =

Conflict in medieval Austria

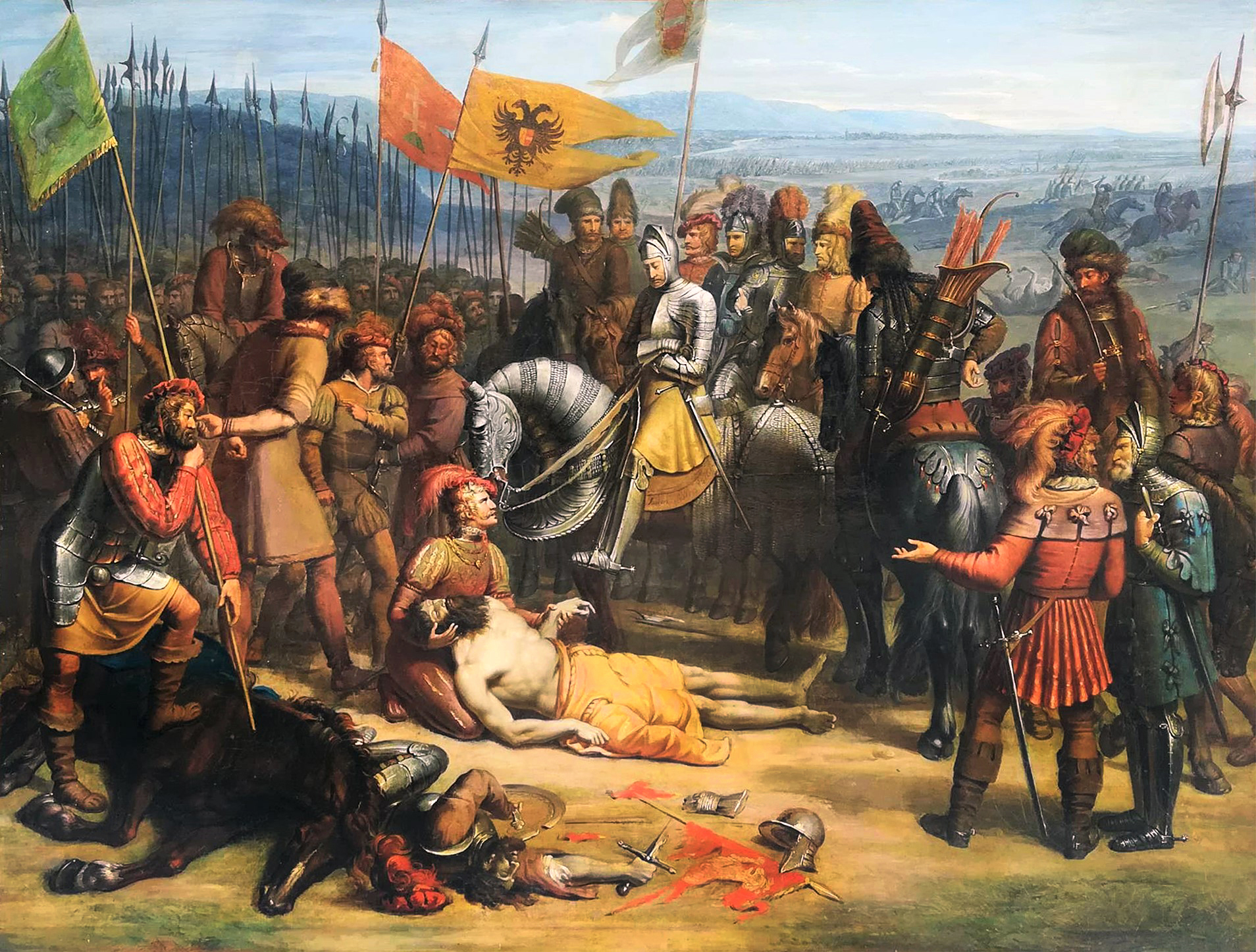
Ottokar II of Bohemia dead at the battle on the Marchfeld, painting by Anton Petter

The War of the Babenberg Succession, sometimes called the Austrian Interregnum, was a succession of conflicts in medieval Austria that lasted from 1246 until 1282. The conflict began over the succession of Duke Frederick II of the House of Babenberg after his death in the battle of the Leitha River against King Béla IV of Hungary on 15 June 1246.

Initially, the Bohemian Přemyslids defeated the Hungarian House of Árpád, but in further fighting were defeated in turn by the House of Habsburg. The interregnum ended when King Rudolf I of Germany granted the escheated duchies of Austria and Styria to his sons Albert and Rudolf, respectively, on 27 December 1282.

== Competing claims, 1246–1250 ==
Following the death of Duke Frederick, the Emperor Frederick II declared Austria and Styria vacant fiefs of the crown and assigned an imperial vicar to govern them. The first such governor was Count Otto I of Eberstein, "captain and procurator of the Holy Empire for Austria and Styria". The emperor's intention was to keep the duchies under direct imperial rule. In 1248, through Otto, the Austrian nobility requested the appointment as duke of Frederick's grandson and namesake, the surviving son of the late duke's sister Margaret and Frederick's late son, King Henry (VII) of Germany. The emperor, however, replaced Count Otto with Duke Otto II of Bavaria in Austria and Count Meinhard III of Gorizia in Styria.

At the time of Frederick's death, neither his sister Margaret nor his niece Gertrude were married. They had a claim to the inheritance because the Privilegium Minus of 1156 had permitted Austria to be inherited through the female line. King Wenceslaus I of Bohemia manoeuvred quickly to marry his heir, Vladislaus Henry III, to Gertrude and press his claim to Austria, but Vladislaus died within months in January 1247. Bohemia did not interfere in the Austrian succession again until 1251.

In 1248, encouraged by Pope Innocent IV, who was at war with the emperor, Gertrude laid claim to the late duke's fiefs. Gertrude's second husband, Margrave Hermann VI of Baden, succeeded in capturing Vienna and exerting some control over Austria, but he was unable to make headway in Styria against Count Meinhard. In the autumn of 1249, Duke Otto of Bavaria invaded Upper Austria. In 1250, the Emperor Frederick, in his last will and testament, granted the nobility's request, naming his grandson Frederick as duke of Austria and Styria. After Hermann's death in October 1250, the duke of Bavaria ramped up his efforts to take control of Austria.

== First Bohemian–Hungarian war, 1251–1254 ==
Hermann was succeeded by a son, Frederick, who was still a child. In 1251, therefore, the Austrian nobility elected a son of the late duke's other sister, Constance. Béla IV took advantage of the instability to invade Austria, but was forced back by Wenceslaus. On 21 November 1251, a delegation of the Austrian nobility meeting with Wenceslaus elected his heir, Ottokar, as their duke. In 1252, Ottokar legitimized his new position by marrying Margaret, whose son by Henry (VII) had died the previous year. Also in 1252, Gertrude married the Halychian prince Roman Danylovich. Béla IV backed the claims of Gertrude and Roman, who in turn provided Halychian troops for the war in 1252–1253. The campaign waged in 1253 by Roman's father, King Daniel of Halych, alongside King Béla and the Polish dukes is recorded in the Annales Ottakariani, the Annales capituli Cracoviensis and the Galician-Volhynian Chronicle. According to the Chronicle, Gertrude forced Béla to swear an oath to hand over his conquests to her and her husband.

In 1252–1254, Otto of Bavaria renewed his efforts to acquire the Babenberg inheritance. In Styria, a section of the nobility elected his son, Henry. Pope Innocent backed Ottokar in return for the latter's recognition of King William, the pope's candidate for the German throne.

In 1254, through papal mediation, Bohemia and Hungary signed the Peace of Buda, ending the first phase of the conflict and dividing the Babenberg territories. Béla IV would rule in Styria and Ottokar in Austria. When Gertrude in turn gave up her claim, Roman Danylovich divorced her and returned to Halych. Ottokar followed up his victory with the Pax Austriaca, a charter or Landfrieden for his duchies consisting of 31 articles, most of them the product of negotiations with the nobility. Ottokar did not appoint provincial governors. Rather, in accordance with the Pax, Austria would be governed in his absence by a council of twelve and by four provincial judges.

== Bohemia ascendant, 1258–1270 ==
In 1258, the Styrians, led by Frederick V of Ptuj, rebelled against the Hungarian captain, Stephen Gutkeled, who was forced to flee along with many Hungarian garrisons. Béla granted Styria to his heir, the future Stephen V, with the title of duke. Stephen quickly overcame the revolt and established himsel in Ptuj. He launched an attack towards Salzburg in order to install as archbishop the Styrian Ulrich of Seckau. He was defeated near Radstadt by Duke Ulrich III of Carinthia.

In late 1259, the Styrian nobility again rebelled, declaring Ottokar their lord. He sent forces in support of the rebels. In the battle of Kressenbrunn in July 1260, Ottokar defeated Béla IV and took control of Styria. In a treaty signed at Vienna on 31 March 1261, Béla IV gave up his claim, although Stephen did not. The Hungarian garrison only left Ptuj after the peace treaty was signed.

In 1261, Ottokar divorced Margaret, a move retroactively approved by Pope Urban IV on 20 April 1262. As part of the settlement, he married Kunigunda, daughter of Duke Rostislav Mikhailovich and grandson of Béla, on 25 October. On 6 August 1262, King Richard of Germany formally invested Ottokar with the duchies of Austria and Styria. This was a reward for Ottokar's decisive vote for Richard in the imperial election of 1257.

Ottokar's territories at their greatest extent

The period from 1261 to 1270 was one of relative peace for Ottokar II, although he briefly warred with Bavaria again in 1262. In the 1260s, he began withdrawing the concessions of the Pax Austriaca that he had made in 1254. He relied increasingly on Bohemian officials and in Styria his rule was often seen as a foreign occupation. In 1269, Ottokar inherited the Duchy of Carinthia and March of Carniola from his uncle, Ulrich III, extending his rule even further south.

The Hungarian defeat in 1260 had major repercussions within the kingdom. In compensation for being deprived of Styria, Stephen was granted Transylvania. In 1262, he was ceded the entire kingdom east of the Danube to rule as king under his father. Relations between father and son descended into civil war in 1264–1266.

== Renewed war, 1270–1273 ==
When Stephen acceded to the whole kingdom of Hungary in 1270, some western counties attempted to secede, recognizing Ottokar as lord. Anna, Stephen's sister and Rostislav's widow, fled to Ottokar's court, taking with her the royal treasure. Stephen thus renewed the conflict over the Babenberg inheritance by sending Cuman raiders into Bohemia. Ottokar responded with an invasion of Upper Hungary in April 1271. Advancing as far as the river Hron, he took the castles of Devín, Pajštún and Bratislava, built a bridge over the Danube and razed the cities of Trnava and Nitra. After crossing the Danube, he defeated a Hungarian army near Mosonmagyaróvár on 21 May. In the subsequent peace treaty signed in Bratislava, Stephen V relinquished his claims on the Babenberg inheritance and to the royal treasure, while Ottokar relinquished his Hungarian conquests and agreed to respect the integrity of the Hungarian kingdom.

In 1272, King Richard and King Stephen died. During the minority of the latter's successor, King Ladislaus IV, the court sent Cumans raiding into Moravia and Austria in February 1273. In May, a Moravian counterinvasion razed Nitra Cathedral, destroying its archives. By late July, Ottokar had joined the invasion with an army of 60,000, marching as far as the river Váh. Crossing the Danube in September, he marched on Szombathely, but the Hungarians avoided battle. Upon learning that Rudolf of Habsburg had been elected to succeed Richard in an imperial election held on 1 October 1273, Ottokar cut short his campaign. He left behind several garrisons, including in Bratislava. According to the Chronicon Colmariense, the election of Rudolf was greeted with joy by Ottokar's opponents in Austria and Styria.

== Bohemian–Habsburg conflict, 1273–1278 ==
Having himself been an imperial candidate in 1273, Ottokar refused to recognize Rudolf as king. Rudolf in turn allied with Ladislaus IV, whom he agreed to help against the Héder clan. In 1274, an imperial diet meeting in Regensburg deprived Ottokar of Austria, Styria, Carinthia and Carniola and ordered him to swear allegiance for Bohemia and Moravia. Ottokar ignored the order and on 15 May 1275 a court diet meeting in Augsburg formally declared Bohemia and Moravia forfeit. To enforce these decisions, Rudolf invaded Austria. He had the support of some rebellious Austrian and Bohemian nobles, as well as Austrian exiles like Wernhard von Wolkersdorf. While a Bavarian force took Klosterneuburg, he besieged Vienna until it surrendered. In 1276, Konrad von Sommerau captured Enns, while the towns of Ybbs and Tulln surrendered without resistance. After further military reverses in September 1276, Ottokar sued for peace. He was forced to perform homage to Rudolf on 26 November 1276 in Vienna, in return for which his imperial fiefs were all returned to him on the condition that his heir, Wenceslaus II, marry Rudolf's daughter, Judith, who immediately received northern Austria.

In 1277, Ottokar attempted to recover these territories. He rejected Rudolf's attempts at negotiation and marched from Prague to Vienna. His decision to besiege Drosendorf and Laa cost him the advantage. Ladislaus IV joined Rudolf with a large army. In a battle on the Marchfeld on 26 August 1278, Ottokar was killed. His son, Wenceslaus II, was obliged to renounce all claims to Austria and Styria in order to preserve his hereditary estates. Rudolf remained three years in Vienna, and then appointed his eldest son governor. After gaining the consent of the imperial electors, he granted the duchies of Austria and Styria to his sons in 1282. As a result, "the Kingdom of Hungary gained nothing from its foreign policy successes."

== Bibliography ==
- Antonín, Robert (2023). "The Foreign Policy of the Last Přemyslids: A First Attempt at Unifying Central Europe?". In Paul Srodecki; Norbert Kersken; Rimvydas Petrauskas (eds.). Unions and Divisions: New Forms of Rule in Medieval and Renaissance Europe. Routledge. pp. 143–157.
- Bačová, Jana (2010). Legitimacy – Superiority – Subordination: The Image of Danil Romanovich in the Context of Foreign Affars in the Galician-Volhynian Chronicle (MA thesis). Central European University.
- Bell, James (1847). A System of Geography, Popular and Scientific. Vol. 1. Edinburgh: A. Fullarton. This article incorporates text from this source, which is in the public domain.
- Berend, Nora; Urbańczyk, Przemysław; Wiszewski, Przemysław (2013). Central Europe in the High Middle Ages: Bohemia, Hungary and Poland, c. 900–c. 1300. Cambridge University Press.
- Brezováková, Blanka; Dvoráková, Daniela; Mrva, Ivan; Daniel, David P. (2000). "Slovakia in the High Middle Ages". In Elena Mannová; Blanka Brezováková (eds.). A Concise History of Slovakia. Bratislava. pp. 55–104.
- Dąbrowski, Dariusz (2023). "Devotion in the Face of Military Struggles in the Galician-Volhynian Chronicle (Chronicle of the Romanovichi)". In Radosław Kotecki; Jacek Maciejewski; Gregory Leighton (eds.). Religious Rites of War beyond the Medieval West, Volume 2: Central and Eastern Europe. Brill. pp. 48–76.
- Engel, Pál (2001). The Realm of St Stephen: A History of Medieval Hungary, 895–1526. I. B. Tauris.
- Erkens, Franz-Reiner (1993). "Zwischen staufischer Tradition und dynastischer Orientierung: Das Königtum Rudolfs von Habsburg". In Egon Boshof; Franz-Reiner Erkens (eds.). Rudolf von Habsburg (1273–1291): Eine Königsherrschaft zwischen Tradition und Wandel. Böhlau Verlag. pp. 33–58.
- Font, Márta (2017). "Prince Rostislav in the Court of Béla IV". Russian History. 44: 486–504. doi:10.1163/18763316-04404002.
- Hufschmid, Michelle T. (2020). The Crusade Against the Staufer in Germany, 1246–51 (PhD dissertation). University of Oxford.
- Kohn, George Childs (1999) [1986]. Dictionary of Wars (Rev. ed.). Routledge.
- Palko, Jakub (2023). "Ulrich I, Bishop of Seckau, and His Activities During the Hungarian Rule Over the Duchy of Styria (1254–1260)". Konštantínove listy. 16 (1): 57–64. doi:10.17846/CL.2023.16.1.57-64.
- Roche, T. W. E. (1966). The King of Almayne: A 13th-Century Englishman in Europe. John Murray.
- Rudolf, Veronika (2023). Közép-Európa a hosszú 13. században [Central Europe in the Long 13th Century] (in Hungarian). Arpadiana XV., Research Centre for the Humanities. ISBN 978-963-416-406-7.
- Van Cleve, Thomas C. (1972). The Emperor Frederick II of Hohenstaufen: Immutator Mundi. Clarendon Press.
- Weiss-Krejci, Estella (2016). "Royal Ancestor Construction and Veneration in the House of Habsburg" (PDF). In Erica Hill; Jon B. Hageman (eds.). The Archaeology of Ancestors: Death, Memory, and Veneration. University Press of Florida. pp. 166–188.
- Weltin, Max (1993). "König Rudolf und die österreichischen Landherren". In Egon Boshof; Franz-Reiner Erkens (eds.). Rudolf von Habsburg (1273–1291): Eine Königsherrschaft zwischen Tradition und Wandel. Böhlau Verlag. pp. 103–124.
