= Ulrich of Seckau (disambiguation) =

Ulrich of Seckau was the bishop of Seckau (1243–1268) and archbishop of Salzburg (1257–1265).

Ulrich of Seckau may also refer to:

- Ulrich von Paldau, bishop of Seckau as Ulrich II (1297–1308)
- Ulrich von Weisseneck, bishop of Seckau as Ulrich III (1355–1372)
- Ulrich von Albeck, bishop of Seckau as Ulrich IV (1417–1431)
