= Cosmas's continuators =

Group of Bohemian authors

Cosmas's continuators (Czech: pokračovatelé Kosmovi; Latin: continuatores Cosmae) were various Bohemian authors who wrote continuations in Latin of the Chronica Boemorum of Cosmas of Prague, which ends with Cosmas's death in 1125. They primarily wrote annals rather than true chronicles.

== First continuation ==
The work of the first anonymous continuator covers the years 1125/1126–1141, being essentially annals of the reign of Soběslav I. The continuator was probably a canon of collegiate church of Vyšehrad, but he may have been a canon of Prague. He originally wrote contemporaneously down to about 1130, but only picked up the work again around 1140. He ended with the death of Soběslav and the accession of Vladislav II in 1141, but an entry covering the civil war of 1142 and a miracle wrought by Saint Ludmila was added to the text in 1151 or 1152 by someone working in Saint George's Church in Prague.

The so-called canon of Vyšehrad or canonicus Wissegradensis was a partisan of Soběslav. He wrote exclusively as an eyewitness and from eyewitness reports. He had a mediocre education but a notable interest in astronomical and meteorological observations. He is the first Czech historian to refer to the Czech nation, which he characterizes as the "family of Saint Wenceslaus".

The first continuation is found in one 14th-century manuscript, three of the 15th century and one more of the 16th century.

== Second continuation ==
The anonymous so-called second continuation of Cosmas or Pragensium canonicorum continuatio (continuation of the canon of Prague) was compiled at Saint Vitus' Cathedral in Prague, probably shortly before 1300, certainly before 1310. It covers the years 1140–1283 as a continuation of the first continuation. It is transmitted in four medieval manuscripts.

The second continuation is a compilation of different sources, combining annalist sections with narrative ones. The different sections are named after their different sources. The so-called Annales Pragenses (Annals of Prague) cover the years 1196–1283 in three parts (1196–1278, 1278–1279, 1279–1283). The Annales Otakariani (Annals of Přemysl Otakar II) cover the reign of Otakar II from 1254 to 1278.

Narrative sections include accounts of Frederick Barbarossa's second Italian campaign in 1159–1160; Otakar II's rebellion in 1248–1249, drawn from a Venceslai I regis historia (History of Václav I); Otakar II's war against Hungary in 1260; Otakar II's war for the German throne, culminating in his death at the Battle on the Marchfeld in 1278; and the rule of Otto V of Brandenburg that followed, including a major famine in 1282. This last section is known as the Zlá léta po smrti krále Přemysla Orakara II, or Narration on the Bad Years after the Death of Přemysl Otakar II. The compilation ends with the Epilogus interpolatoris, an account of the legendary founding of Czechia and a list of Czech rulers down to Václav II.

The first and second continuators differ from Cosmas in key ways. They eschewed the narrative chronicle in favour of the annals, and they dispensed with classical references in favour of biblical ones. Although the canon of Vyšehrad compared the hero of the battle of Chlumec in 1126 to Achilles, the 13th-century continuators prefer comparing the Czechs to the ancient Israelites. This annalistic biblical form of historiography was unique in central Europe.

== Other continuations ==
Vincent of Prague, whose chronicle covers the years 1140–1167 of the reign of Vladislav II, may also be regarded as a continuator of Cosmas. His work was continued down to 1198 by Gerlach of Milevsko.

In the 1170s, an anonymous monk of Sázava combined a history of his monastery from its foundation—De exordio Zazavensis monasterii—with a continuation of Cosmas down to 1162.

The two latest continuators are Henry the Carver, whose Chronicle of the abbey of Žďár ends in 1300, and Henry of Heimburg, whose Chronicle of the Czechs ends in the same year.

== Editions ==
- Bláhová, Marie; Fiala, Zdeněk (eds.). Pokračovatelé Kosmovi. Prague, 1974.
- Emler, Josef; Tomek, Václav Vladivoj (eds.). Fontes rerum Bohemicarum, Vol. 2. Prague, 1874.
