= Bohemian–Hungarian wars =

Bohemian–Hungarian wars include:

- War of the Babenberg Succession (1251–1278)
- Bohemian–Hungarian War (1468–1478)
