= Annales Bohemorum =

Annales Bohemorum may refer to the main work of:

- Vincent of Prague (fl. 1140–1170)
- Wenceslaus Hajek (d. 1553)
