= Philip of Spanheim =

German bishop (died 1279)

- Patriarch of Aquileia
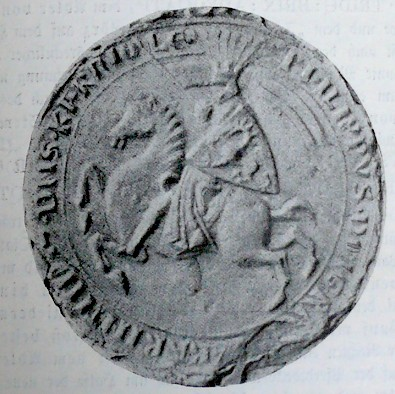
- Seal of Philip of Sponheim
- Church: Catholic Church
- Archdiocese: Patriarchate of Aquileia
- Appointed: 21 December 1273
- In office: 1273–1299
- Predecessor: Philip of Spanheim
- Successor: Konrad II the Hunchback
- Other posts: Archpriest of Monza (1251–1262); Archbishop of Milan (1261–1262; nominal); Bishop of Como (1262–1274)

Personal details
- Died: 23 February 1299
- Buried: Basilica of Aquileia

Philip of Spanheim (also Philip of Sponheim; died 22 July 1279) was a 13th century bishop who was elected Archbishop of Salzburg (1247–1257) and Patriarch of Aquileia (1269–1271). He held the title of a Count of Lebenau (1254–1279) and was nominal Duke of Carinthia. With his death the senior line of the House of Sponheim came to an end.

== Early life ==
Philipp was the younger son of Duke Bernhard of Carinthia (died 1256) and his wife Judith, daughter of the Přemyslid king Ottokar I of Bohemia. Raised at the court of his maternal uncle King Wenceslaus I, he prepared for an ecclesiastical career as provost of the Vyšehrad collegiate church and Bohemian chancellor.

== Career ==
However, when in 1247 the Salzburg chapter elected him archbishop, he renounced his consecration in order to reserve the succession of his elder brother Ulrich III for himself. Instead he joined his father on military campaigns to Styria and into the Lungau region; in 1252 they defeated the united troops of Count Meinhard III of Gorizia and his father-in-law Count Albert IV of Tyrol near Greifenburg and conquered large estates in Upper Carinthia.

In 1254 Philip tried to regain former Spanheim comital rights around Lebenau Castle (near Laufen), which had been purchased by the Salzburg archbishops. In turn, he was finally overthrown and banned by the Salzburg chapter in 1257, he could however prevail against his successor Ulrich of Seckau with the military support by his brother Ulrich III. Philip continued his belligerence and in 1260 fought with his Přemyslid cousin King Ottokar II of Bohemia in the Battle of Kressenbrunn against the forces of King Béla IV of Hungary. After in 1265 his maternal cousin Ladislaus of Silesia was elected Salzburg archbishop with papal consent, Philip finally was forced to resign.

On 23 September 1269, he was elected Archbishop of Aquileia, though his election was never acknowledged by the Pope and in 1273 Pope Gregory X appointed Raimondo della Torre instead. Moreover, in October 1269 his brother Duke Ulrich III died, and he secretly bequested the Carinthian duchy to King Ottokar II, who immediately expelled Philip from his acquisitions. He again attempted to install himself as a Count of Lebenau and even reached the enfeoffment with Carinthia by the new King Rudolf I of Germany, though to no avail. Ottokar had no intentions to relinquish his claims until he was finally defeated by King Rudolf in 1278 in the Battle on the Marchfeld.

Philip however had to stay in Rudolf's Duchy of Austria without ever returning to Carinthia.

== Death ==
One year later he died in Krems an der Donau, where his epitaph is preserved in the Dominican Church.

Catholic Church titles
Preceded by Gregorio of Montelongo	Patriarch of Aquileia; 1269-1273	Succeeded by Raimondo della Torre
