= Engelhartstetten =

- Municipality
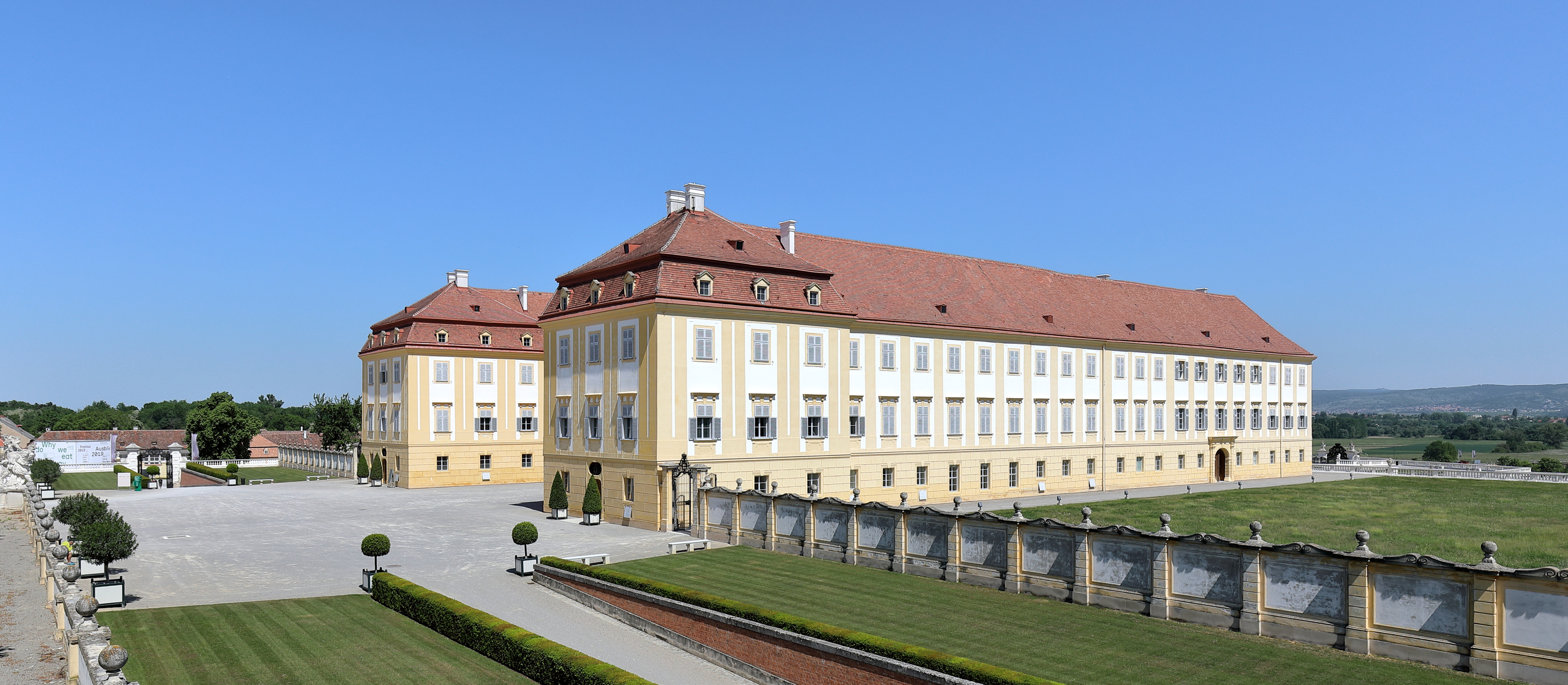
- Castle Schlosshof

- Flag Coat of arms

- Location within Austria
- Coordinates: 48°11′N 16°53′E
- Country: Austria
- State: Lower Austria
- District: Gänserndorf

Government
  - Mayor: Josef Reiter (ÖVP)

Area
  - Total: 65.66 km^{2} (25.35 sq mi)
- Elevation: 143 m (469 ft)

Population (2017)
  - Total: 1,979
  - Density: 30.14/km^{2} (78.06/sq mi)
- Time zone: UTC+1 (CET)
  - Summer (DST): UTC+2 (CEST)
- Postal code: A-2292
- Area code: +43 2214
- Vehicle registration: GF
- Website: www.engelhartstetten.at

Engelhartstetten is a town in the district of Gänserndorf in the Austrian state of Lower Austria.

== Geography ==
Engelhartstetten lies near Vienna in the southeast corner of the Marchfeld. On the east is the Morava River and on the south the Danube. About 12 percent of the municipality is forested.

== History ==
- The Battle of Kressenbrunn was fought in July 1260 near Groissenbrunn.
