= Ulrich of Seckau =

Ulrich of Seckau (died July 1268) was the bishop of Seckau (1243–1268, as Ulrich I) and archbishop of Salzburg (1257–1265). He was opposed as archbishop by Philip of Spanheim and never effectively controlled the diocese.

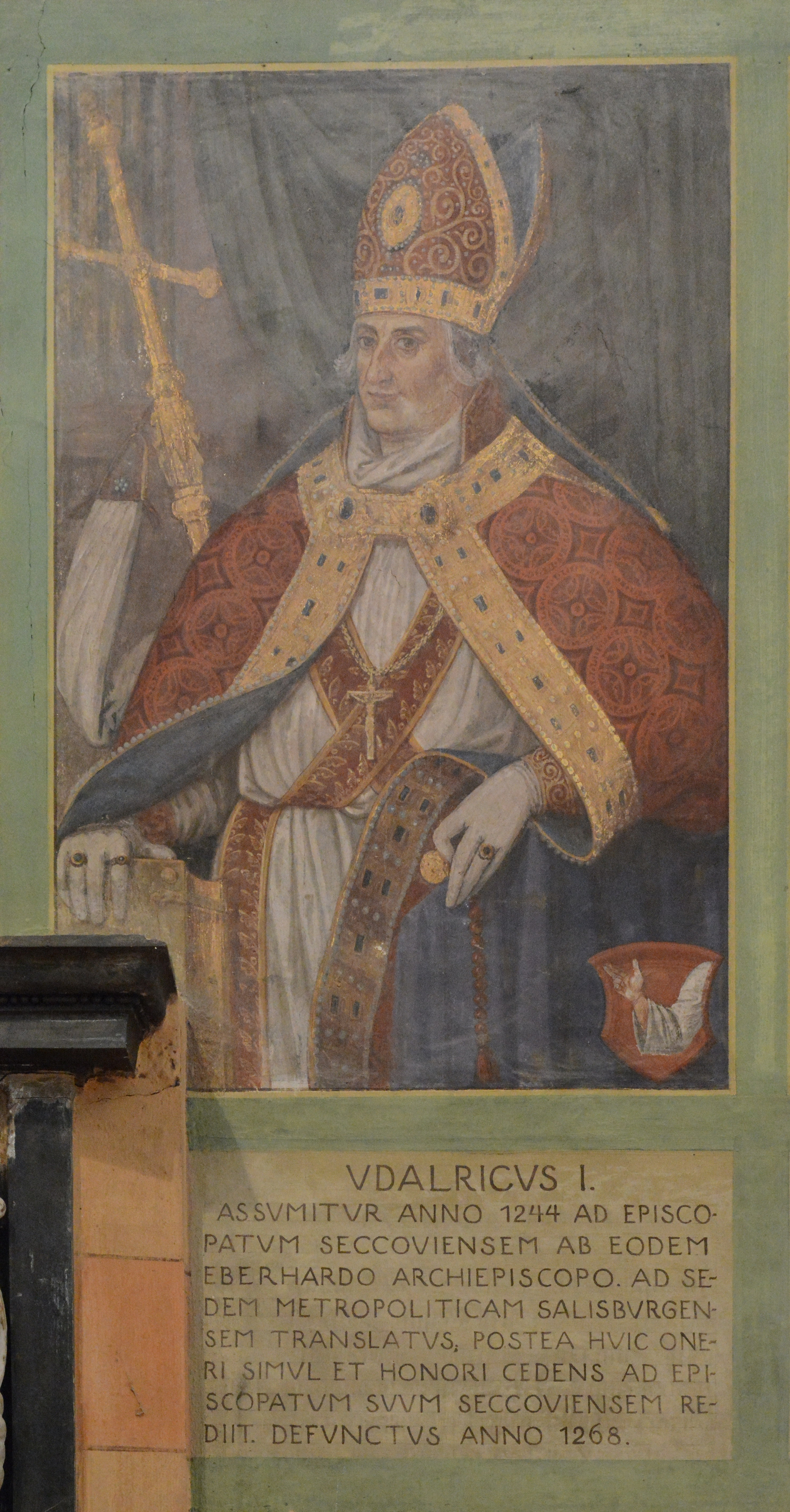
Mural depicting Ulrich I in the Basilica of Seckau (c. 1595)

== Bishop of Seckau ==
Ulrich's origins are unknown. He probably belonged either to the burgher or the ministerial class. He first appears as a scribe in the chancery of Duke Frederick II of Austria around 1232. His first ecclesiastical post was as the parish priest in Kirchberg am Walde. He subsequently accepted a canonry in the cathedral of Passau and served Frederick as his protonotary. In 1243, at Frederick's insistence, he was appointed bishop of Seckau by Archbishop Eberhard II of Salzburg. He was only ordained bishop in 1246.

In the War of the Babenberg Succession that followed the death of Duke Frederick in 1246, Ulrich at first followed the lead of the pope, who supported the claim of King Ottokar II of Bohemia. In 1253, Ulrich visited Ottokar at Leoben. In 1254, the Duchy of Styria came under Hungarian rule by treaty and Ulrich readily accepted it. That year he acquired a house in Graz that was to become the episcopal palace. In 1255, he received compensation for damage inflicted by Herrand von Wildonie. He was the first bishop of Seckau recognized as a prince-bishop.

== Fight for Salzburg ==
In 1256, Ulrich was elected to the archbishopric of Salzburg because the previously elected Philip of Spanheim refused to take holy orders. In 1257, Pope Alexander IV approved his translation to the archdiocese. In 1258, he received the pallium. Philip, however, refused to step aside. His ministerials controlled Salzburg itself, so Ulrich was unable to effectively govern the archdiocese. Ulrich's position was weakened further because he refused to step down from Seckau, which was contrary to canon law, giving excuse to those who refused to recognize him. In practice, Ulrich's influence was mostly confined Hungarian-controlled Styria. He was recognized by the bishops of Freising, Conrad I and Conrad II.

Ulrich was supported by Duke Henry XIII of Lower Bavaria. He was also supported by Hungary. In 1258, Duke Stephen of Styria, the son of King Béla IV of Hungary, attempted to gain Salzburg by force and install Ulrich. The bishop was present when Stephen was defeated near Radstadt by the army of Philip's brother, Duke Ulrich III of Carinthia. Philip was probably present at the battle. Ulrich was captured and was briefly held as a prisoner by Philip before being released.

In 1259, Alexander IV excommunicated Ulrich for his failure to remit monies to Rome. Ulrich nevertheless pronounced excommunication on all the vassals of the archbishopric who supported Philip. In May, Ulrich stood as guarantor when Duke Stephen placed Rein Abbey under his protection. By 1261, however, the Hungarian position in Styria had collapsed. In 1262, Ulrich was excommunicated a second time over debts. In 1264, he finally entered Salzburg but was unpopular with the people. That same year Ulrich resigned the archbishopric, but this was only confirmed by Pope Clement IV in 1265. He continued as bishop of Seckau until his death in July 1268. He suffered a stroke in 1266 that left him unable to speak. He died and was probably buried in the village of Piber, near Köflach.

== Works cited ==
- Freed, John B. (1988). "The Prosopography of Ecclesiastical Elites: Some Methodological Considerations from Salzburg". Medieval Prosopography. 9 (1): 33–59. JSTOR 44946069.
- Freed, John B. (1995). Noble Bondsmen: Ministerial Marriages in the Archdiocese of Salzburg, 1100–1343. Cornell University Press.
- Krones, Franz (1895). "Ulrich (Erzbischof von Salzburg)". Allgemeine Deutsche Biographie (in German). Vol. 39. Leipzig: Duncker & Humblot. pp. 233–234.
- Ortner, Franz (2016). "Ulrich". Neue Deutsche Biographie (in German). Vol. 26. Berlin: Duncker & Humblot. p. 592. (full text online).
- Palko, Jakub (2023). "Ulrich I, Bishop of Seckau, and His Activities During the Hungarian Rule Over the Duchy of Styria (1254–1260)". Konštantínove listy. 16 (1): 57–64. doi:10.17846/CL.2023.16.1.57-64.
