= Battle on the Marchfeld =

1278 battle of the Great Interregnum

Coordinates: 48°28′53.45″N 16°52′38.34″E

- Part of the Great Interregnum and the War of the Babenberg Succession
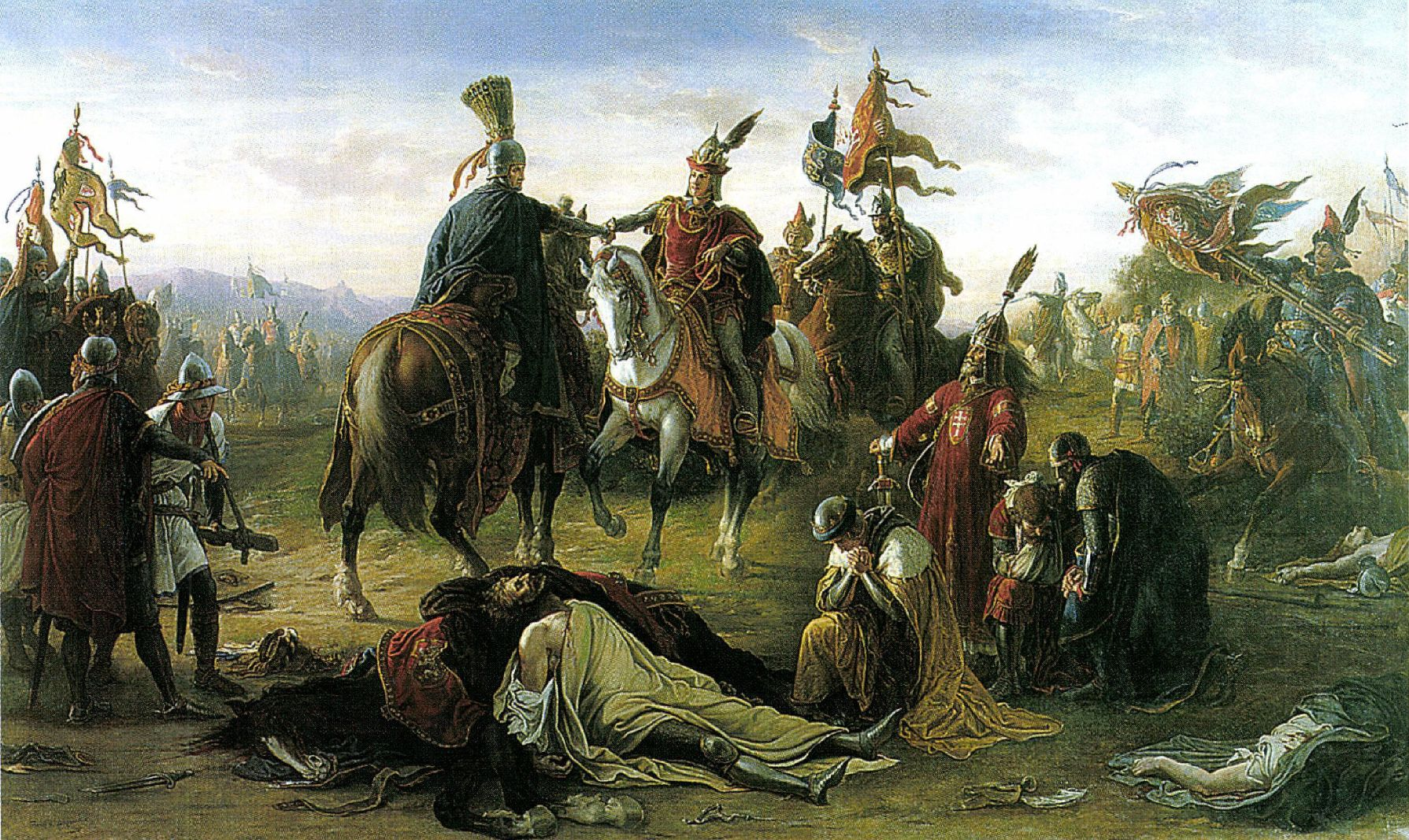
- Meeting of King Ladislas IV of Hungary and Rudolph of Habsburg on the Battlefield of Marchfeld, painting by Mór Than, 1873
| Date | 26 August 1278 |
| Location | Between Dürnkrut and Jedenspeigen in the present-day Austrian state of Lower Austria |
| Result | Habsburg–Hungarian victory |

Belligerents
| Kingdom of Hungary (including Cumans and Székelys); Kingdom of Germany; Duchy of Austria; Burgraviate of Nuremberg; Mercenaries: Duchy of Swabia; Duchy of Styria; Duchy of Upper Bavaria | Czech lands: Kingdom of Bohemia; Margraviate of Moravia; Duchy of Głogów; Duchy of Lower Bavaria; Duchy of Silesia; Mercenaries: March of Brandenburg; Duchy of Styria; March of Meissen; Lesser Poland; Greater Poland |

Commanders and leaders
| Ladislaus IV of Hungary; Rudolf I of Habsburg; Ludwig II; Frederick III | Ottokar II Přemysl †; Henry III; Otto IV; Henry I; Milota of Dědice (heavy cavalry) |

Strength
| 18,000 men and cavalry 2,000 men | 6,000 cavalry 1,000 heavy cavalry 5,000 light cavalry |

Casualties and losses
| Heavy; less than Ottokar coalition | Heavy; More than Habsburg-Hungarian coalition |

The Battle on the Marchfeld (i.e. Morava Field; German: Schlacht auf dem Marchfeld / Schlacht bei Dürnkrut und Jedenspeigen; Czech: Bitva na Moravském poli; Hungarian: Második morvamezei csata / dürnkruti csata; Polish: Bitwa pod Suchymi Krutami) at Dürnkrut and Jedenspeigen took place on 26 August 1278 and was a decisive event for the history of Central Europe for the following centuries. The opponents were a Bohemian (Czech) army led by the Přemyslid king Ottokar II of Bohemia and the German army under the German king Rudolph I of Habsburg in alliance with King Ladislaus IV of Hungary. With 15,300 mounted troops, it was one of the largest cavalry battles in Central Europe during the Middle Ages. The Hungarian cavalry played a significant role in the outcome of the battle.

King Ottokar II of Bohemia expanded his territories considerably from 1250 to 1273, but suffered a devastating defeat in November 1276, when the newly elected German king Rudolph I of Habsburg imposed the Imperial ban on Ottokar, declaring him an outlaw and took over Ottokar's holdings in Austria, Carinthia, Carniola, and Styria. Ottokar was reduced to his possessions in Bohemia and Moravia, but was determined to regain his dominions, power, and influence. In 1278 he invaded Austria, where parts of the local population, especially in Vienna, resented Habsburg rule. Rudolf allied himself with King Ladislaus IV of Hungary and mustered forces for a decisive confrontation.

Ottokar abandoned his siege of Laa an der Thaya and advanced to meet the allies near Dürnkrut, north of Vienna. Both armies were composed purely of cavalry and were divided into three divisions that attacked the enemy piecemeal. In the first phase of the battle, the Cuman horse archers in the Hungarian army outflanked and distracted the Bohemian left flank by launching arrows while the Hungarian light cavalry crashed into the Bohemians, driving them from the field. In the second phase, a great collision of knights and heavy cavalry took place in the center, with Rudolf's forces being driven back. Rudolf's third division, led by the king personally, attacked and halted Ottokar's charge. Rudolf was unhorsed in the melee and nearly killed. At a decisive moment, a German cavalry force of 200 riders, commanded by Ulrich von Kapellen, ambushed and attacked the Bohemian right flank from the rear. Assailed from two directions at once, Ottokar's army disintegrated into a rout, and Ottokar himself was killed in the confusion and slaughter. The Cumans pursued and killed the fleeing Bohemians with impunity.

The battle marked the beginning of the ascendancy of the House of Habsburg in Austria and Central Europe. The influence of the Přemyslid kings of Bohemia was diminished and restricted to their inheritance in Bohemia and Moravia.

== Background ==
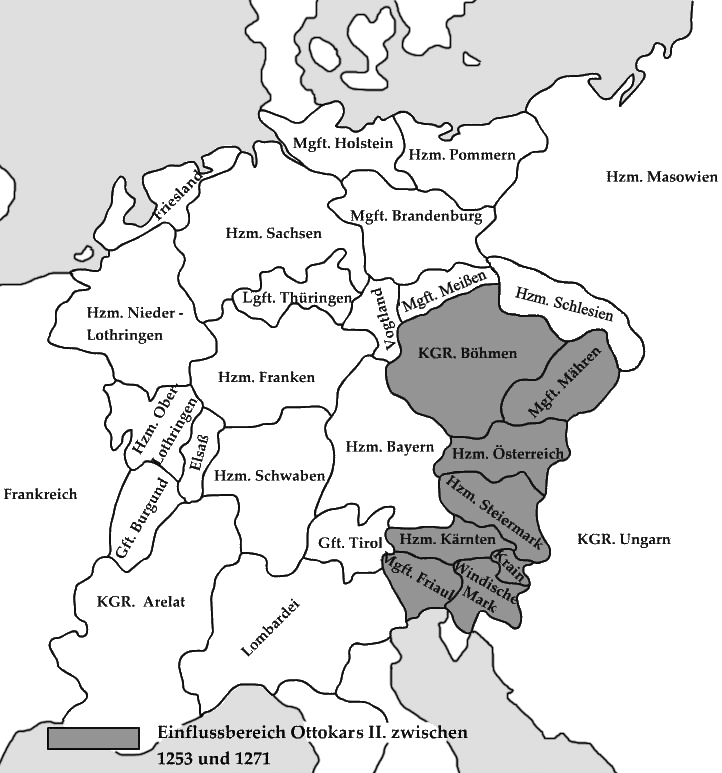
Ottokar's lands in 1272

The death of Emperor Frederick II of Hohenstaufen in 1250 and subsequently his son Conrad IV of Germany, created a grave crisis for the Holy Roman Empire, as in the following decades several nobles were elected as Rex Romanorum and Emperor-to-be, none of whom were able to gain actual governing power upon the Emperor's death in 1250. That same year, Ottokar II, son of King Wenceslaus I of Bohemia, moved into the princeless Duchies of Austria and Styria. The last Babenberg duke Frederick II of Austria had been killed at the 1246 Battle of the Leitha River, in a border conflict he had picked with King Béla IV of Hungary. Ottokar II gained the support of the local nobility and was proclaimed Austrian and Styrian duke by the estates one year later.

In 1253, Ottokar II became Bohemian king upon the death of his father; the concentration of power on the western Hungarian border was viewed with suspicion by King Béla IV, who campaigned against Austria and Styria but was finally defeated at the 1260 Battle of Kressenbrunn. In 1268 Ottokar signed a contract of inheritance with Ulrich III, the last Carinthian duke of the House of Sponheim, and thus acquired Carinthia including the March of Carniola and the Windic March one year later. At the height of his power he aimed at the Imperial crown, but the Princes-Electors (Kurfürsten), distrustful of his steep rise, elected the "poor Swabian count" Rudolph of Habsburg King of the Romans on 29 September 1273.

== Prelude ==
As the election had taken place in his absence, Ottokar did not acknowledge Rudolph as King. Rudolph himself had promised to regain the "alienated" territories which had to be conferred by the Imperial power with consent of the Prince-electors. He claimed the Austrian and Carinthian territories for the Empire and summoned Ottokar to the 1275 Reichstag at Würzburg. By not appearing before the Diet, Ottokar set the events of his demise in motion. He was placed under the Imperial ban and had all his territorial rights revoked, including even his Bohemian inheritance.

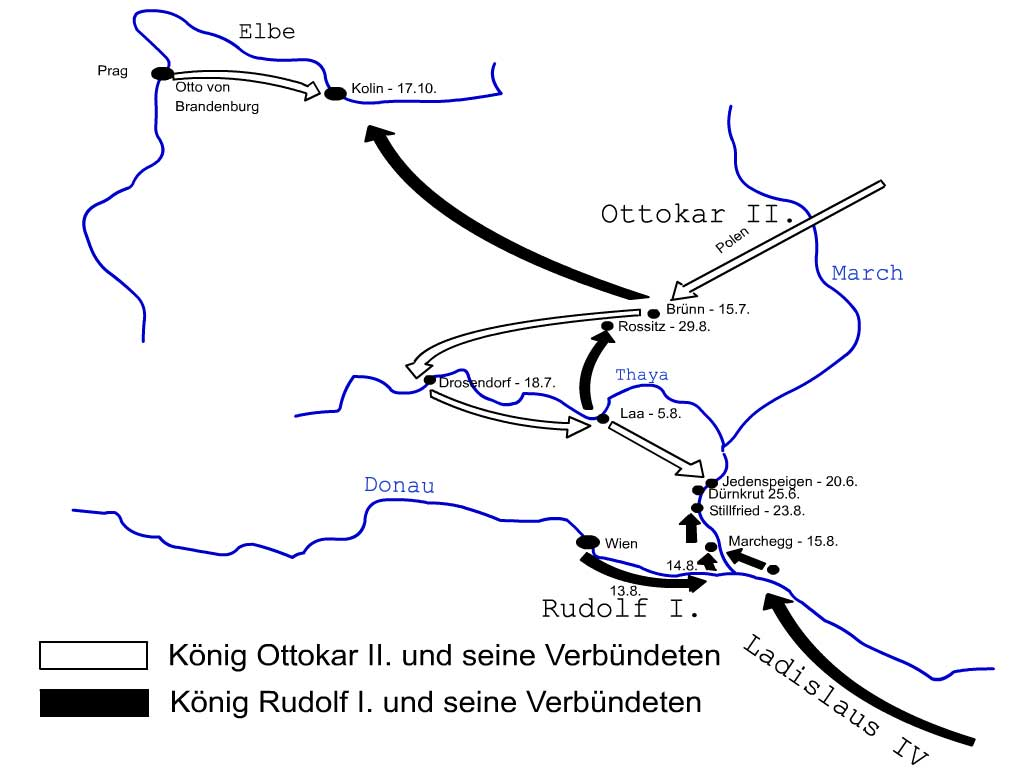
Movements of the opposing forces prior to the battle (in German)

Meanwhile, Rudolph was gathering allies and preparing for battle. He achieved two of these alliances through the classic Habsburg style – marriage. First, he married his son Albert to Elisabeth of Gorizia-Tyrol. In return, her father Count Meinhard II of Gorizia-Tyrol received the Duchy of Carinthia as a fief. Second, he established an — unstable — alliance with Duke Henry I of Lower Bavaria by offering Rudolph's daughter Katharina as wife for the Duke's son, Otto, in addition to the region of present-day Upper Austria as a pledge for her dowry. He also concluded an alliance with King Ladislaus IV of Hungary, who intended to settle old scores with Ottokar.

Rudolph, so strengthened, besieged Ottokar at the Austrian capital Vienna in 1276. Ottokar was forced to surrender and to renounce all his acquisitions, receiving only Bohemia and Moravia as a fief from King Rudolph. Heavily deprived by this, he was determined to regain his territories and contracted an alliance with the Ascanian Margraves of Brandenburg and the Polish princes. In 1278 he campaigned against Austria, supported by Duke Henry I of Lower Bavaria, who had switched sides. Ottokar first laid siege to the towns of Drosendorf and Laa an der Thaya near the Austrian border, while Rudolph decided to leave Vienna and to face the Bohemian army in open battle in the Morava basin north of the capital, where the Cuman cavalry of King Ladislaus could easily join his forces.

== Opposing forces ==
Ottakar fielded 6,000 cavalry, of which 1,000 were heavily armed and armored and 5,000 lightly equipped riders. Ottokar's heavy cavalry rode armored horses. About one third of Ottakar’s knights were Poles from Silesia, Greater Poland and Lesser Poland. Rudolf had 300 heavy cavalry and 4,000 light cavalry, of which an indeterminate number were Hungarians. Rudolf's force included a force of 5,000 Cuman horse archers.

== Battle ==
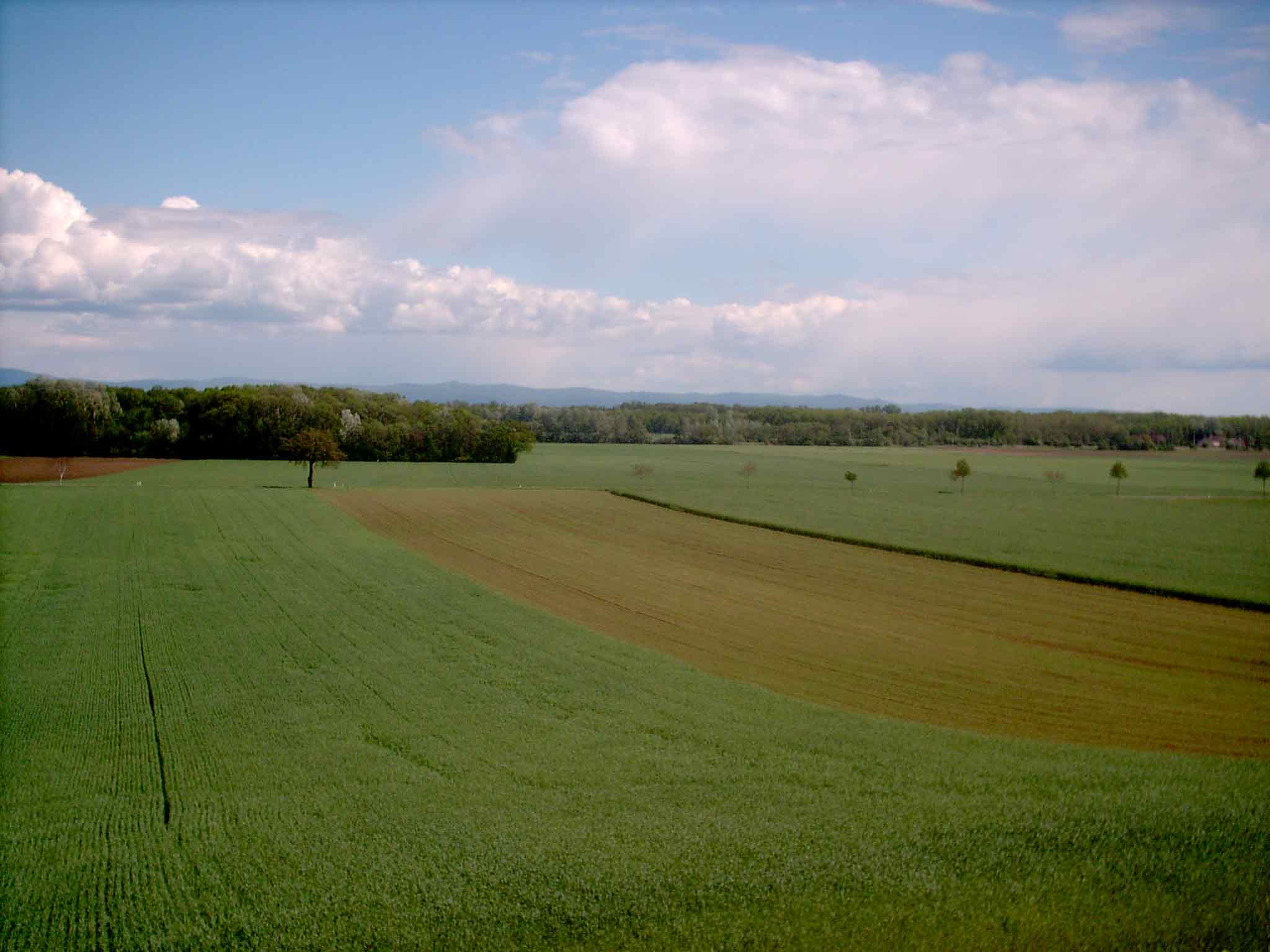
The ground was ideal for a cavalry battle

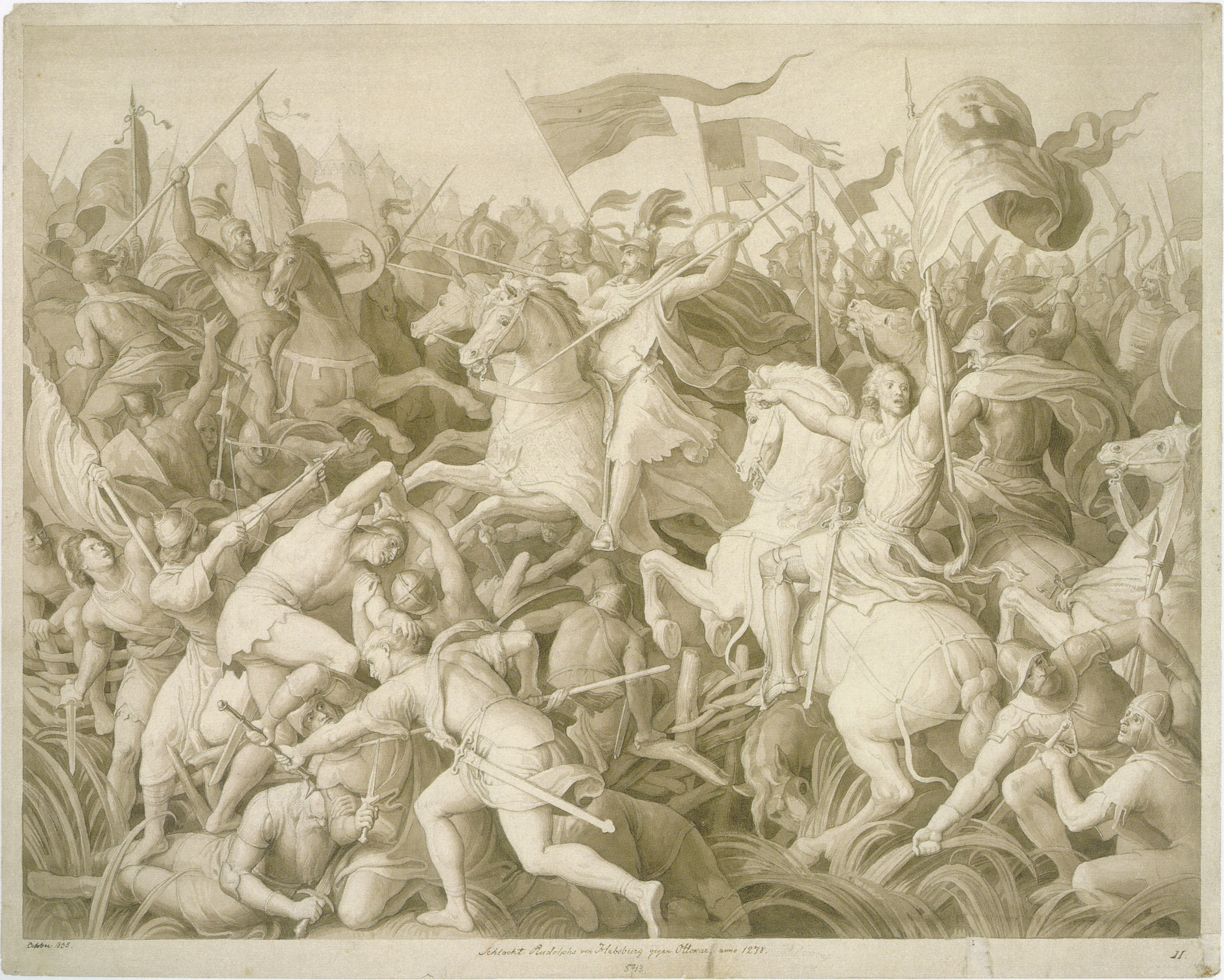
Battle of Rudolph of Habsburg against Ottokar of Bohemia. A drawing by Julius Schnorr von Carolsfeld, 1835

Surprised by Rudolph's maneuver, Ottokar quickly abandoned the siege at Laa, marched southwards, and on August 26 met the united German and Hungarian forces near Dürnkrut. When he arrived his enemies had already taken the opportunity to explore the topography of the future battleground. From the early morning, the left wing of the advancing Bohemian troops were embroiled in impetuous attacks by the Cuman forces, which the heavily armed knights could not ward off. Nevertheless, as the main armies collided and the battle wore on, Ottokar's outnumbering cavalry seemed to gain the upper hand, when even Rudolph's horse was stabbed under him and the 60-year-old narrowly escaped with his life, rescued by his liensmen.

After three hours of continuous fighting on a hot summer day, Ottokar's knights in their heavy armour were suffering from heat exhaustion and were not able to move. At noon Rudolph ordered a fresh heavy cavalry regiment he had concealed behind nearby hills and woods to attack the right flank of Ottokar's troops. Such ambushes were commonly regarded as dishonourable in medieval warfare and Rudolph's commander Ulrich von Kapellen apologized to his own men in advance. Nevertheless, the attack prevailed in splitting and stampeding the Bohemian troops. Ottokar became aware of the surprise attack and tried to lead a remaining reserve contingent in the rear of von Kapellen's troops, a maneuver that was misinterpreted as a rout by the Bohemian forces. The resulting collapse led to a complete victory for Rudolph and his allies. Ottokar's camp was plundered, and he himself was found slain on the battlefield.

According to the history of the Irinyi family, Ladislaus, son of Vid, an ancestor of the old Hungarian noble family, distinguished himself at the Battle of Marchfeld in 1278 by striking down King Ottokar II of Bohemia and capturing a son of the king. A royal charter dated to 1279 records that King Ladislaus IV of Hungary granted Vid's sons, Wenceslaus and Ladislaus, a three-yoke holding in Iriny, in Szatmár County, in recognition of their military service, particularly at the Battle of Marchfeld. The family's coat of arms is also said to commemorate this event.

== Aftermath ==
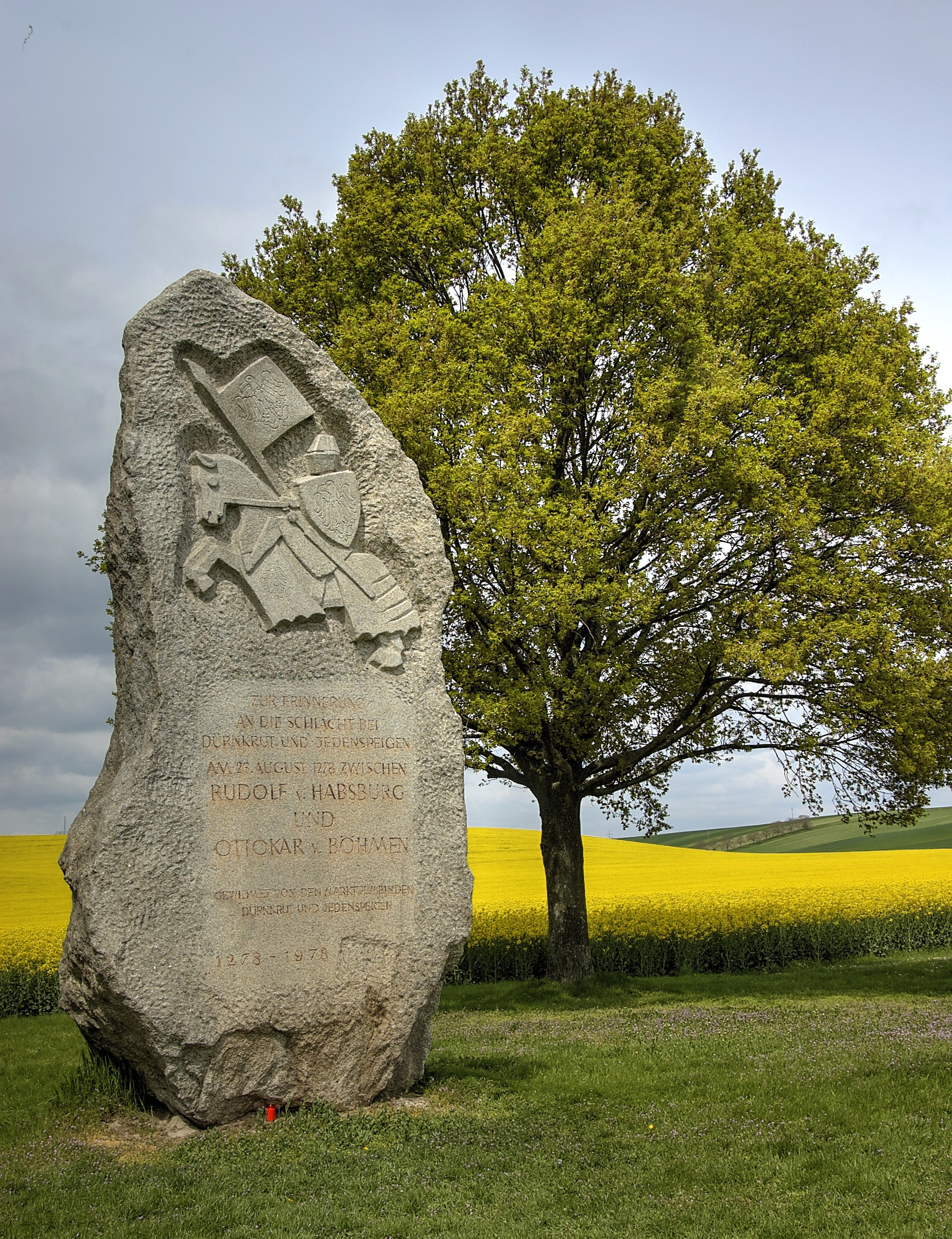
Monument erected in 1978 on the battlefield between the villages Dürnkrut and Jedenspeigen

Rudolph, to demonstrate his victory, had Ottokar's body displayed in Vienna. The "poor count" from Swabian Habsburg Castle assured his possession of the Duchies of Austria and Styria, the heartland and foundation of the rise of the House of Habsburg. At the 1282 Diet of Augsburg, he installed his sons Albert and Rudolf II as Austrian dukes; their descendants held the ducal dignity until 1918. However, in Bohemia, Rudolph acted cautiously and reached an agreement with the nobility and Ottokar's widow Kunigunda of Slavonia on the succession of her son Wenceslaus II to the throne. On the same occasion he reconciled with the Brandenburg margraves, ceding them the guardianship over the minor heir apparent. King Ladislaus IV exerted himself in the christianization of the Cuman warriors, before he was assassinated in 1290.

Ottokar's son, the young king Wenceslaus II of Bohemia, turned out to be a capable ruler. In 1291 he acquired the Polish Seniorate Province at Kraków and was crowned King of Poland in 1300. He was even able to secure the Hungarian crown for his son Wenceslaus III, still a minor, who nevertheless was murdered in 1306, one year after his father's death, whereby the Přemyslid dynasty became extinct.

=== Casualties ===
No exact data on casualties is available, but Ottokar's losses were considerably higher than Rudolf's.

== In art and popular culture ==
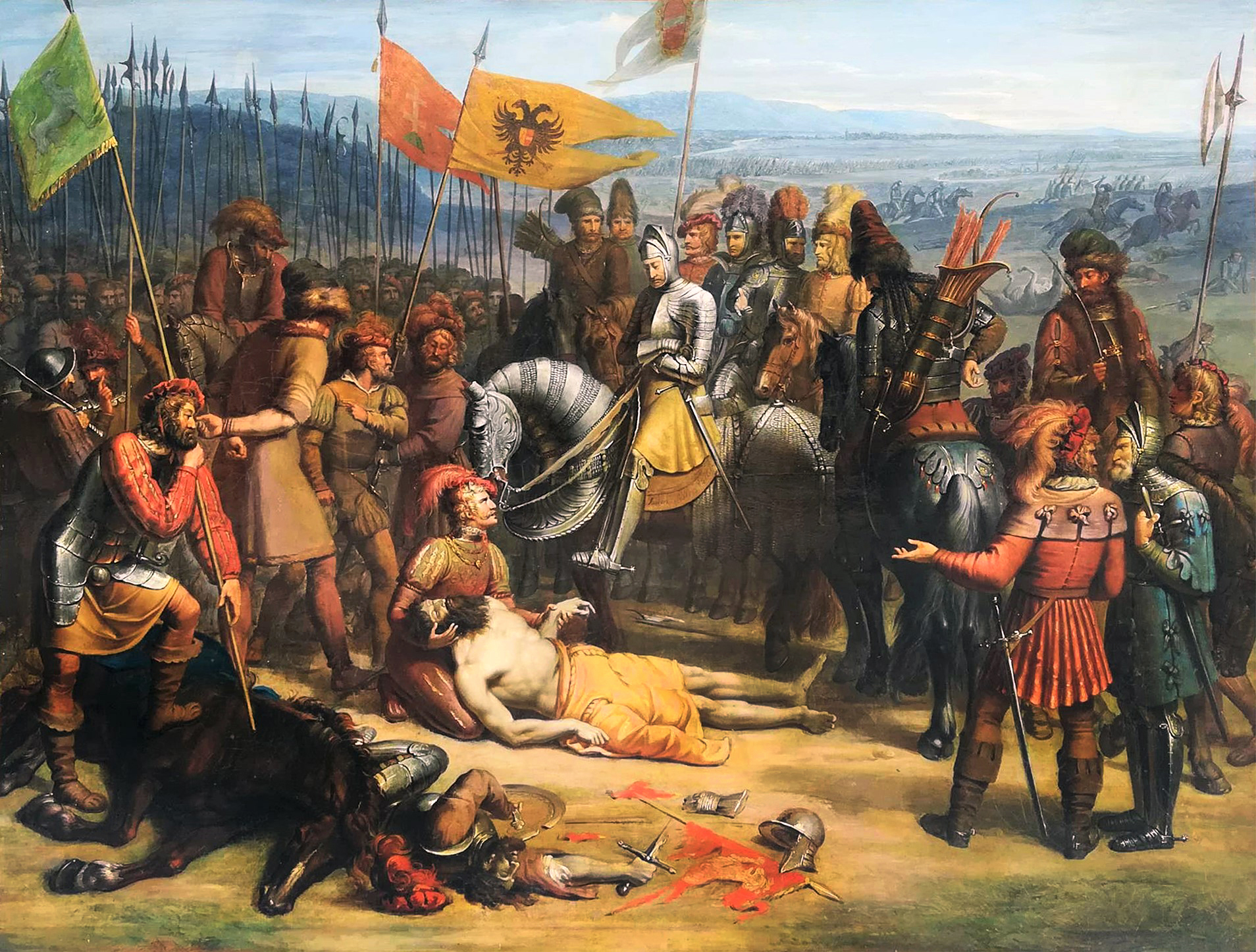
Battle on the Marchfeld (painting by Anton Petter, 1858)

The battle was depicted in art especially during the rise of nationalism in the 19th century, when it was viewed as the example of a traditional co-operation between the Habsburg dynasty (Austria) and the Kingdom of Hungary, from one side, and the traditional tension between the Habsburg dynasty and Bohemia, from the Czech side.

The tragedy König Ottokars Glück und Ende written by Franz Grillparzer in 1823 is based on the rise and fall of king Ottokar II. The drama was originally inspired by the life of Napoleon, but Grillparzer, fearing Metternich's censorship, chose to write the play about Ottokar, in whose story he found many parallels. It nevertheless was immediately forbidden and could not be performed until 1825. Grillparzer perpetuated the legend of Ottokar's wife, Margaret of Babenberg, unsuccessfully trying to reconcile the opponents on the eve of the battle. In fact, Margaret had died in 1266.

The opera The Brandenburgers in Bohemia, by the Czech composer Bedřich Smetana in 1863, was inspired by the battle and the following events.

== See also ==
- Battle of Kressenbrunn
- List of battles 601–1400
- Battle of Rozgony
