= Vincent of Prague =

Vincent of Prague (fl. 1140–1170) was a Czech priest and chronicler. He was a canon and notary of Prague Cathedral. His Annals cover the reign of Vladislav II of Bohemia from his accession in 1140 until 1167.

Vincent was in the entourage of Bishop Daniel of Prague between 1154 and 1160. He was thus an eyewitness to many important events in the Holy Roman Empire. He took part with Daniel and Vladislav in Emperor Frederick I's campaign in Italy in 1158. When Milan sued for peace, the city first approached the bishops—including Daniel of Prague—and then Vladislav, who dictated terms of surrender that Vincent wrote down. Rahewin included the text of this surrender agreement in his chronicle.

Vincent's Annals is a strictly chronological account of Vladislav's reign down to 1167, when it abruptly stops. The Italian campaign of 1158 takes up over a third of the work. In his prologue Vincent states his purpose as recording the gesta (deeds) of King Vladislav and the opera gloriosa (glorious works) of his queen, Judith of Thuringia. The unfinished Annals were continued by Gerlach of Milevsko between 1214 and 1222. Vincent himself is sometimes regarded as one of Cosmas's continuators.

== Works ==
- Annals

- Annales Bohemorum Vincentii Pragensis, ed. Josef Emler. Fontes rerum Bohemicarum, 2. Prague, 1874, pp. 407–460.
- Vincentii Pragensis Annales, ed. Wilhelm Wattenbach. Monumenta Germaniae Historica, Scriptores 17. Hanover, 1861, pp. 658–683.
