= Ulrich von Liechtenstein =

German singer and poet (c. 1200–1275)

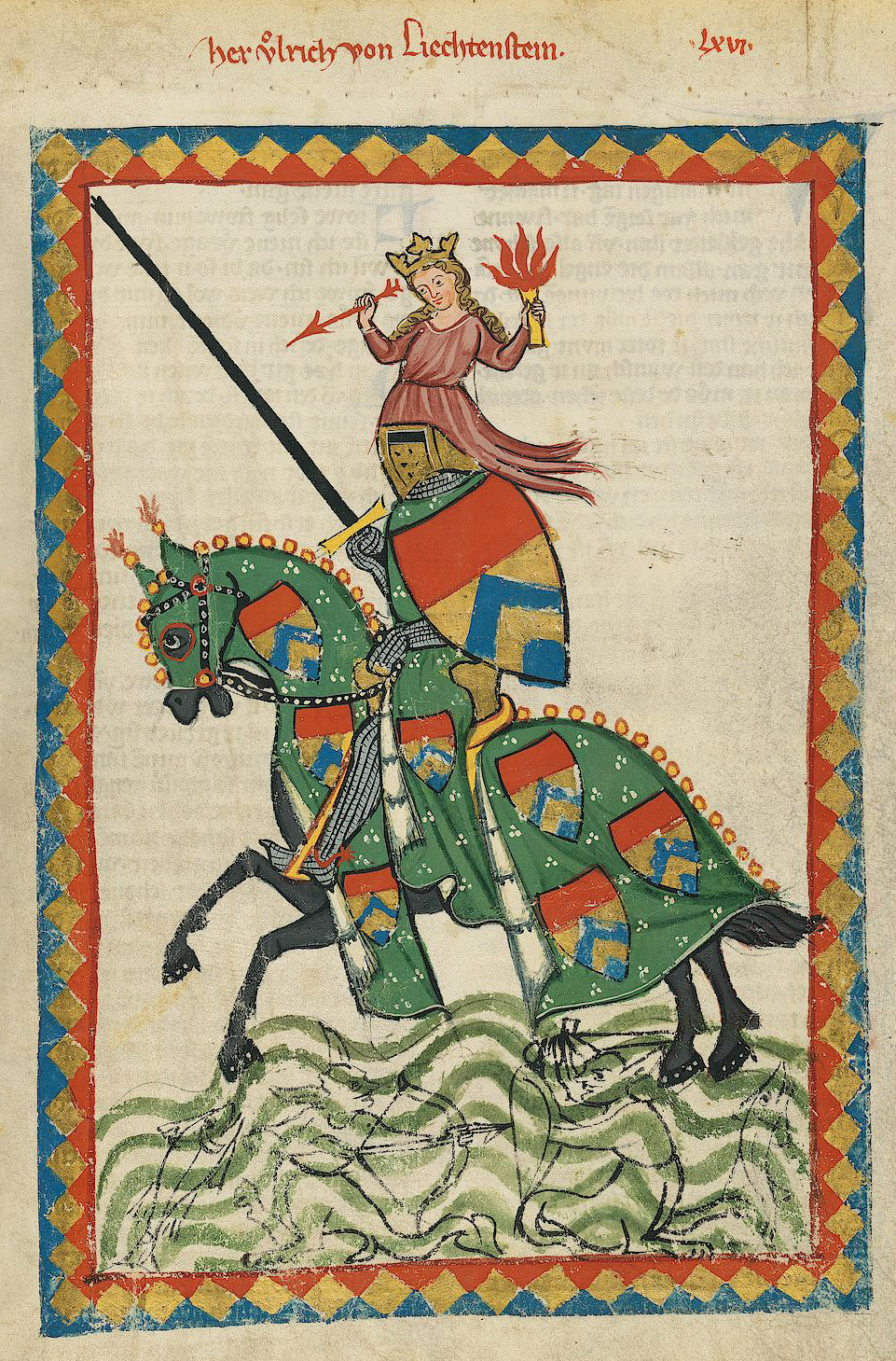
Portrait of Ulrich from the Codex Manesse

Ulrich von Liechtenstein (c. 1200 – 26 January 1275) was a German minnesinger, poet and knight of the Middle Ages. He wrote poetry in Middle High German and was author of noted works about how knights and nobles might lead more virtuous lives. Ulrich was a member of a wealthy and influential ministerialis family from Liechtenstein in Styria. He was born about 1200 at Murau in the Duchy of Styria, now Styria, Austria.

Ulrich wrote his poetry at a time when knightly ideals were being promulgated in Western Europe. He outlines rules for knights, ministeriales, and free nobles to lead honourable and courtly lives. There are several instances where he places the (unfree) ministerials and the free nobles in one category separate from the knights to point out the nobility of his own estate.

Details of Ulrich's life are difficult to ascertain. Much of what scholars know relies heavily upon information gleaned from his often-fictional, self-styled autobiographical work the Frauendienst (trans. Service of Ladies). Separating fact from stylized hyperbole has proven difficult for historians.

== Life ==
From the age of 12 onwards, Ulrich received training as a page to a lady of much higher station than his family followed by another four years as a squire to Margrave Henry of Istria, son of Duke Berthold IV of Merania, he was knighted by the Babenberg duke Leopold VI of Austria in 1222. Ulrich is documented as a Styrian Truchsess in 1244/45, from 1267 to 1272 Marshal and in year 1272 also a provincial judge.

When Philip of Sponheim, the Archbishop-Elect of Salzburg, was deposed by Pope Alexander IV for refusing to take holy orders, Philip raised an army to defend his title. In 1250, Ulrich agreed to fight for Philip's cause in return for Philip's arranging a beneficial marriage of Ulrich's son, Ulrich II, to Kunigunde of Goldegg and Philip added a dowry of 400 Salzburg pounds to the agreement. In return Ulrich I agreed to provide Philip with 100 fighting men for his cause. In August 1252 Philip's forces decisively defeated his enemies at the Battle of Sachsenburg on the Drava, and Ulrich was one of seven who mediated the ensuing peace.

Leader of the Styrian nobility, Ulrich had a hand in absorbing the duchy into the possessions of Rudolph of Habsburg after the ducal House of Babenberg had become extinct in 1246. It is possible that Ulrich was one of the noblemen taken prisoner by King Ottokar II of Bohemia in 1269. He owned three castles, besides Liechtenstein another at Strechau near Lassing in the Enns Valley and the third at his birthplace Murau. When his son Ulrich II married, Ulrich bestowed upon the couple the castle of Murau along with twenty vassals and revenue.

Many aspects of his life are unrecorded, but some genealogy survives. He had a brother named Hartnid who served as Bishop of Gurk from 1283 to 1298 and a brother named Dietmar IV of Liechtenstein-Offenburg, who had a son named Gundaker. Besides Ulrich's son, Ulrich II, he had a daughter named Diemut (who married Wulfing of Trennstein), a son named Otto II, and a son-in-law named Herrand II of Wildon by another daughter whose name is unknown.

Ulrich died on 26 January 1275. He was buried in Seckau in modern-day Austria.

== Works ==
=== Frauendienst ===
Ulrich is famous for his supposedly autobiographical poetry collection Frauendienst (Service of Ladies). He writes of himself as a protagonist who does great deeds in honour of noblewomen, following the conventions of chaste courtly love. The protagonist embarks on two remarkable quests. In the first quest, he travels from Mestre near Venice to Vienna in the guise of Venus, the goddess of love. He challenges all the knights he meets to a joust in honour of his lady. He breaks 307 lances and defeats all comers. The noblewoman, however, mostly spurns his affections and demands more deeds and even mutilation for even the honour to hold her hand. In the second quest, he takes on the role of King Arthur ("Artus"), with his followers becoming Arthurian Round Table characters. Regrettably, the first two folios of the beginning of this quest have been lost. The protagonist, Ulrich, wanders through Styria and Austria in the guise of King Arthur inviting all knights to "break lance" (that is, to joust) three times with him for honour's sake. In this disguise he attended many tournaments. The story illustrates how a worthy knight-errant was supposed to wander about defeating opponents in honourable combat. The story intersperses some songs and courtly advice to knights and admonitions to greedy nobles and faithless squires. The collection was finished in 1255.

=== Frauenbuch ===
Frauenbuch was a dialogue set in 1240, published in 1257, lamenting the decay of chivalric courtship.

== In popular culture ==
The protagonist of the 2001 film A Knight's Tale, played by Heath Ledger, assumes the name Ulrich von Liechtenstein when he poses as a knight, though his true name is actually William Thatcher. However, the character claims to come from Gelderland, which was not in Styria but rather in the Low Countries.

== Bibliography ==
- Arnold, Benjamin. German Knighthood 1050-1300 Oxford: Oxford University Press, 1985)
- Freed, John B.Noble Bondsmen: Ministerial Marriages in the Archdiocese of Salzburg, 1100–1343 (Ithaca: Cornell University Press, 1995)
- Murray, Alan V., 'Tourney, Joust, Foreis and Round Table: Tournament Forms in the Frauendienst of Ulrich von Liechtenstein', in Pleasure and Leisure in the Middle Ages and Early Modern Age: Cultural-Historical Perspectives on Toys, Games, and Entertainment, ed. Albrecht Classen (Berlin: De Gruyter, 2019), pp. 365–94
- Ulrich von Liechtenstein, The Service of Ladies, translated by J.W. Thomas, UK: Boydell & Brewer Ltd, 2004, ISBN 1-84383-095-7
