= Anton Petter =

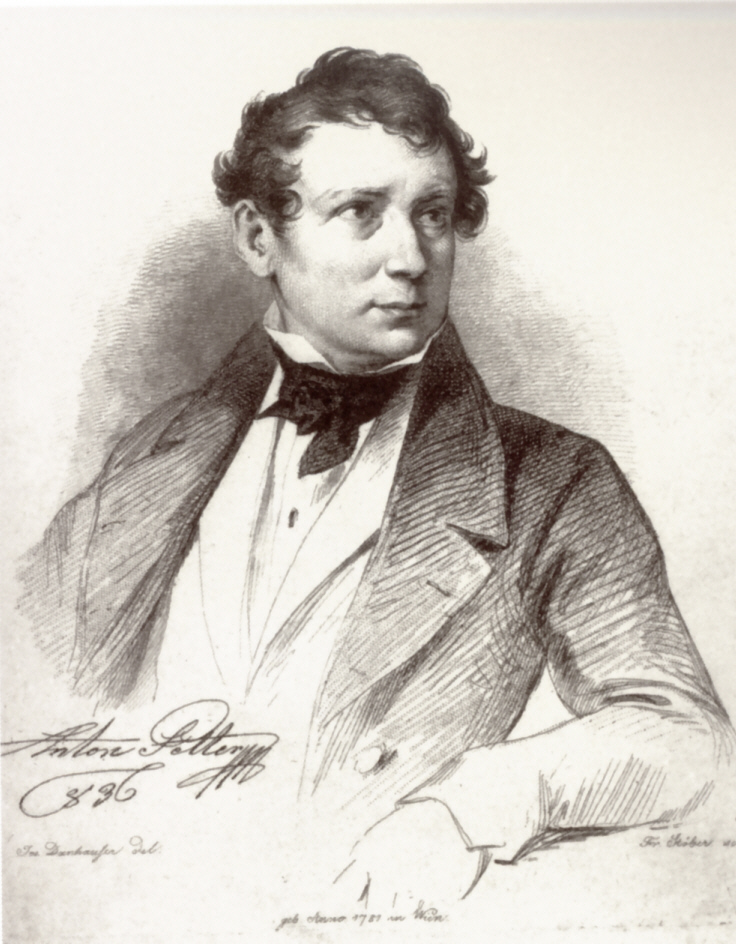

Anton Petter (April 12, 1781, Vienna – May 14, 1858, Vienna) was a painter from the Austrian Empire.

== Biography ==
He visited Rome in 1808. In 1820 he became professor at the academy of Vienna, and in 1828 he was named director of that institution.

== Honors ==
He won several prizes at the academy of Vienna, to which he was admitted in 1814 in reward for his “Meleager murdered by his Mother in the Arms of his Wife.”

== Works ==
Among his works are:

- “Meeting of Maximilian with his Bride, Mary of Burgundy”
- “Rudolph of Habsburg”
- “Queen Joan beside the Coffin of her Husband Philip”
- “Charles V. visiting his Prisoner, Francis I”
