= Ulrich III of Carinthia =

Ulrich III of Spanheim
- Duke of Carinthia, Lord of Carniola
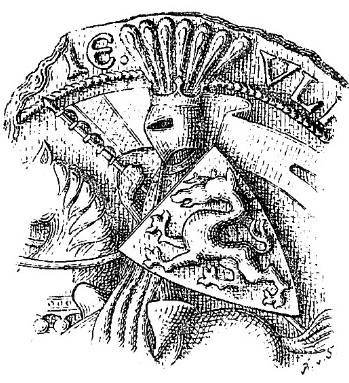
- Part of a seal used by Ulrich III
- Duke: 1256–1269
- Predecessor: Bernhard von Spanheim
- Successor: Ottokar II of Bohemia
- Born: c. 1220
- Died: 27 October 1269; Cividale del Friuli
- Noble family: House of Sponheim
- Spouses: Agnes of Andechs; Agnes of Baden
- Father: Bernhard von Spanheim
- Mother: Judith of Bohemia

Ulrich III (c. 1220 – 27 October 1269) was the ruler in the March of Carniola from c. 1249 and Duke of Carinthia from 1256 until his death, the last ruler from the House of Sponheim. His rule had long-lasting consequences. In Carniola, he acquired the former Meranian possessions, thus becoming the first undisputed princeps terrae, provincial lord or landgrave, creating the power and legal basis of the future Duchy of Carniola. The center of his original Carniolan possessions, Ljubljana, became the new administrative center and thus the provincial capital, as well as the center of Ulrich's power. In Carinthia, which he took over after his father's death, his seal became the coat of arms of Carinthia up to today. Despite his attempts to secure the vast Babenberg inheritance through two marriages, first to Agnes of Merania, widow of the last Babenberg duke Frederick II of Austria, and then to Frederick's niece Agnes of Baden, Ulrich remained childless. After a short interregnum by his younger brother Philip of Spanheim, patriarch of Aquileia, the House of Spanheim went extinct, and all of Ulrich's possessions were inherited by his cousin Ottokar II of Bohemia.

== Life ==
Ulrich III was the eldest son of Duke Bernhard of Carinthia and his wife Judith, a daughter of the Přemyslid king Ottokar I of Bohemia. Already his father had endeavoured to assume the rule over the Carniolan march, which Ulrich could secure for himself by marrying Agnes of Andechs, the widow of the last Babenberg duke Frederick II of Austria. From 1251, he was co-ruler of Carinthia with his father; in 1256 he succeeded his father as duke.

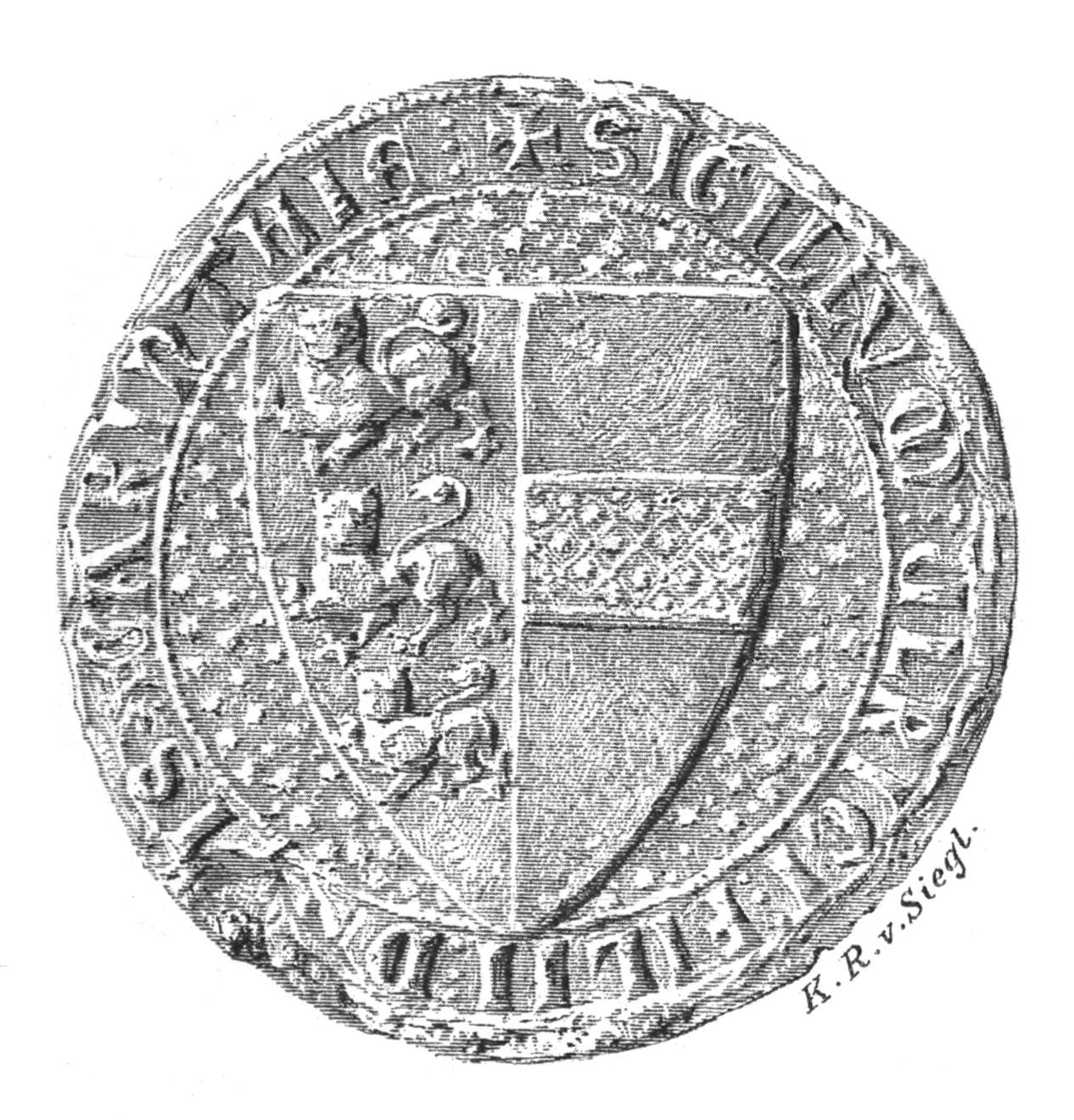
Later version Ulrich's seal, which became the Carinthian coat of arms

Ulrich continued the development of his home territories as his father began. In 1260, he completed the foundation of the charterhouse in Bistra (Freudenthal) near Ljubljana. He also founded the Canons Regular monastery in Völkermarkt.

He had differences of opinion about his father's inheritance with his younger brother Philip, who had to prepare for an ecclesiastical career and was elected Archbishop of Salzburg in 1247. Philip refused to take holy orders in order to reserve the right of succession in Carinthia for himself. Ulrich and Philip finally reached an agreement of mutual protection and inheritance and, after Philip was deposed as bishop in 1257 by the cathedral chapter, fought together against Philip's successor, Archbishop Ulrich of Seckau.

After the election of Archbishop Ladislaus of Salzburg, it became clear that Philip would have to abandon all hopes to return to Salzburg. In 1267 he asked Ulrich III to divide their inheritance and also proposed that he could be Ulrich's heir, as Ulrich's son from his first marriage had died young, and his second marriage was still childless. However, on 4 December 1268, Ulrich secretly proceeded to Poděbrady Castle, where he concluded an inheritance treaty with his cousin, King Ottokar II of Bohemia, in which the king was made his sole heir.

When Duke Ulrich III died in Cividale del Friuli on 27 October 1269, both Philip and Ottokar II claimed his inheritance. In the same year, on 23 September, Philip was elected Patriarch of Aquileia, however, his election was never confirmed by the Pope and in 1270/71 he was expelled to Austria by Ottokar's forces. This was the end of the 150-year long rule of the Sponheim dynasty in Carinthia.

== Marriages and issue ==
Ulrich III was married twice:

1. to Agnes of Merania (1215–1263), the widow of Duke Frederick II of Austria. This marriage produced a son, who died young.
2. to Agnes of Baden (1250–1295), a daughter of Margrave Herman VI of Baden and Gertrude of Babenberg, niece of Duke Frederick II of Austria. This marriage remained childless.

== Notes ==
Ulrich III of Carinthia House of Spanheim Born: c. 1220 Died: 27 October 1269
Preceded by Bernhard	Duke of Carinthia; 1256-1269	Succeeded by Ottokar II of Bohemia
Preceded by Frederick II of Austria	Margrave of Carniola; 1248-1269	Succeeded by Ottokar II of Bohemia
