= Battle of Kressenbrunn =

1260 battle

- Part of War of the Babenberg Succession
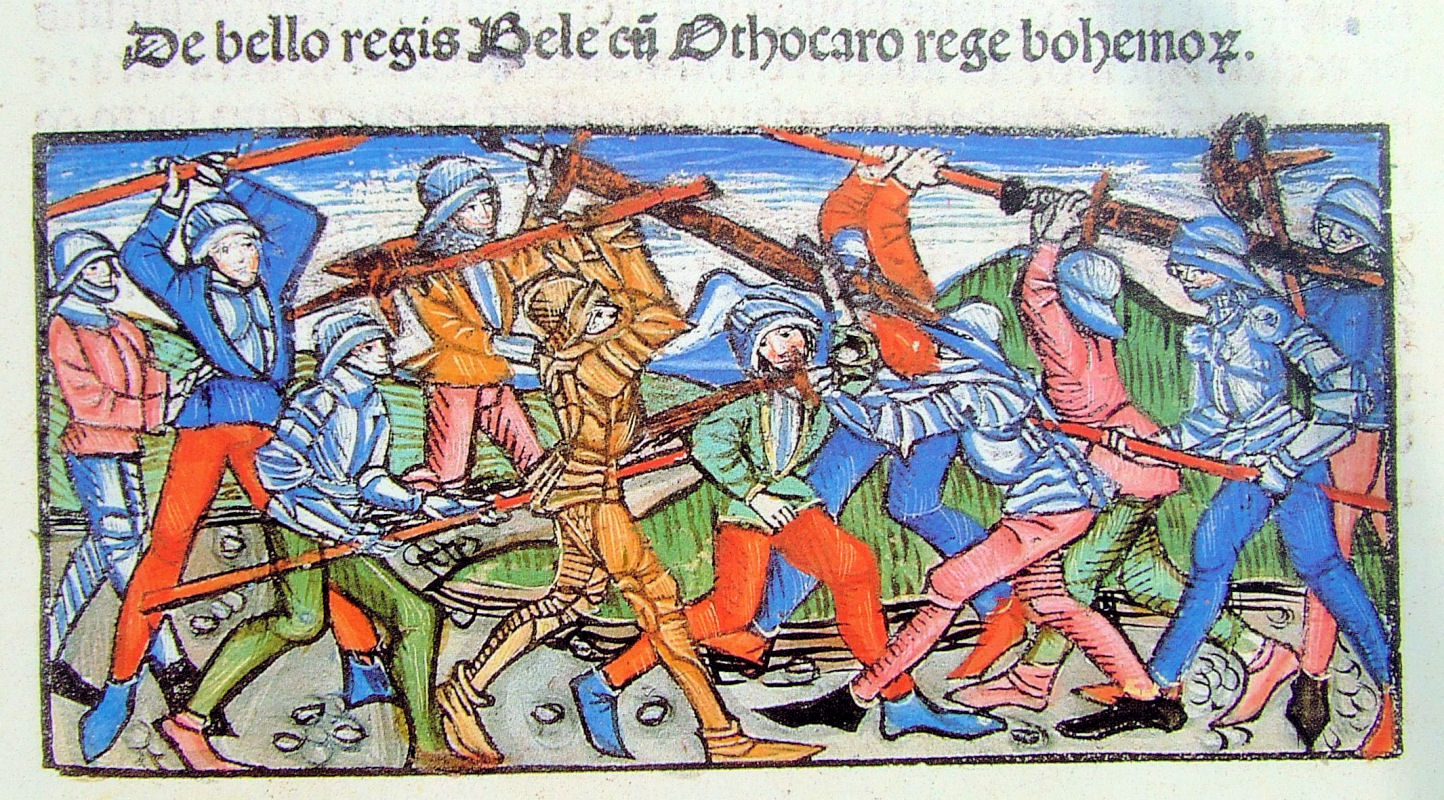
- Battle of King Béla IV of Hungary and King Ottokar II of Bohemia, Chronica Hungarorum by Johannes de Thurocz
| Date | July 1260 |
| Location | near Kressenbrunn, today Groißenbrunn, part of Engelhartstetten, Lower Austria |
| Result | Bohemian-led victory |

Belligerents
| Czech lands: Kingdom of Bohemia; Margraviate of Moravia; Duchy of Austria; Duchy of Styria; Duchy of Silesia; Duchy of Carinthia | Kingdom of Hungary; Kingdom of Croatia; Duchy of Kraków; Kingdom of Rus |

Commanders and leaders
| Ottokar II Přemysl; Jaroš of Poděhusy; Vok of Rožmberk; Bruno of Schauenburk | Béla IV Árpád; Stephen; Bolesław V |

Strength
| 30,000 | 35,000 |

Casualties and losses
| Low | 10,000 |

The Battle of Kressenbrunn (Hungarian: Első morvamezei csata / kroissenbrunni csata) was fought in July 1260 near Groissenbrunn in Lower Austria between the Kingdom of Bohemia and the Kingdom of Hungary for the possession of the duchies of Austria and Styria. The Bohemian forces were led by King Ottokar II Přemysl, while the Hungarians were led by his cousin, King Béla IV of Hungary.

In 1251, Ottokar's father King Wenceslaus I of Bohemia had not only granted him the title of a Margrave of Moravia, but also installed him as duke of Austria and Styria, territories that were princeless after the ruling Babenberg dynasty had become extinct in 1246. To legitimate his succession, Ottokar in 1252 married the Duchess Margaret of Austria, the sister of the last Babenberg duke and about 26 years his senior.

When Ottokar followed his father as King of Bohemia in 1253, Béla, distrustful of his rising power, claimed the Styrian duchy. Meanwhile, Margaret's niece Gertrude had married Roman Danylovich, son of King Daniel of Galicia and relative of the Árpád dynasty. The quarrels were at first settled with the aid of Pope Innocent IV in 1254, when Béla received large parts of Styria and later installed his son Stephen as a duke. However, in 1260 the conflict rekindled, after the Styrian nobility had revolted against the Árpáds and Ottokar reclaimed the duchy. Béla allied with Daniel of Galicia and Bolesław V the Chaste of Poland and marched against Ottokar. The Kingdom of Hungary couldn't recover from the devastation of the Mongol invasion of 1240 and 1241, therefore it lost much of its former political and military positions. Historians estimate that up to half of Hungary's then population of 2,000,000 were victims of the Mongol invasion.

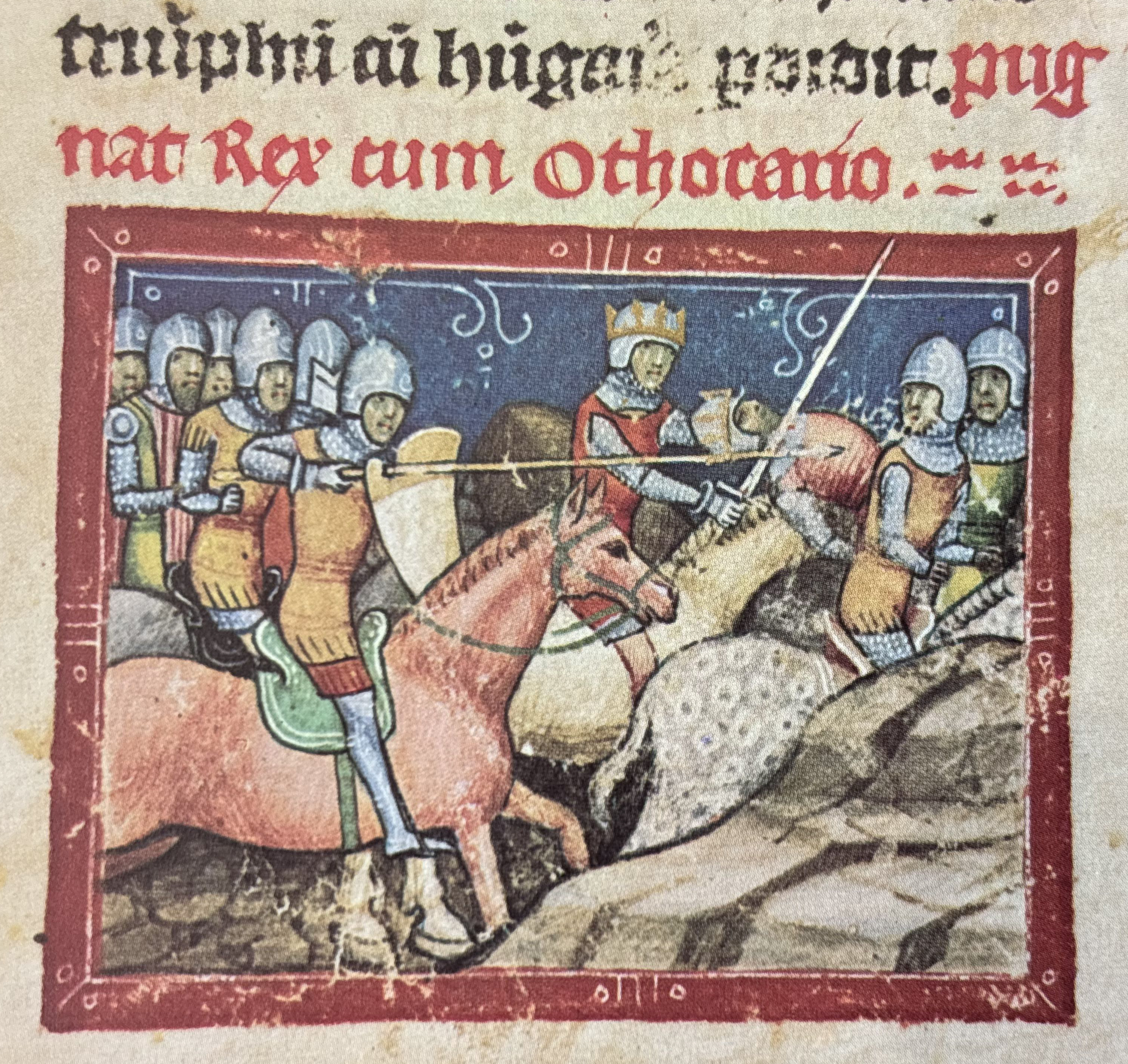
The Battle of Kressenbrunn, King Béla IV of Hungary is depicted riding a white horse (Illuminated Chronicle)

Ottokar's troops consisted of Bohemian-Moravian, German, Polish, Carinthian, Carniolan, and Styrian forces, while Bela's huge army gathered Hungarian, Cuman, Russian, Polish, Bulgarian, Wallachian, Galician, Slavonian, Croatian, Bosnian, Serbian, Pecheneg, and Szekler contingents. Both sides met on different sides of the Morava River, where they eyed each other for some time. As none of the belligerents dared to cross the river, Ottokar proposed an agreement, that his troops would withdraw to give the Hungarians the opportunity to go reach the other bank. As they pulled back, Béla's son Stephen started an attack, went over the Morava and reached the retiring Bohemian cavalry at the village of Kressenbrunn. However Ottokar called back his forces and managed to repulse Stephen who was seriously injured. The returning Bohemian forces routed Béla's troops, many of which on the run drowned in the river.

The fight is considered one of the biggest battles in Central Europe in the Middle Ages, though scholars doubt the possibility of supplying such a vast number of mercenaries. After Ottokar's victory, King Béla renounced the Duchy of Styria and in 1261 even arranged the marriage of his granddaughter Kunigunda of Slavonia with the Bohemian king. However his successors continued to challenge the Bohemian kingdom.

== Memorial ==
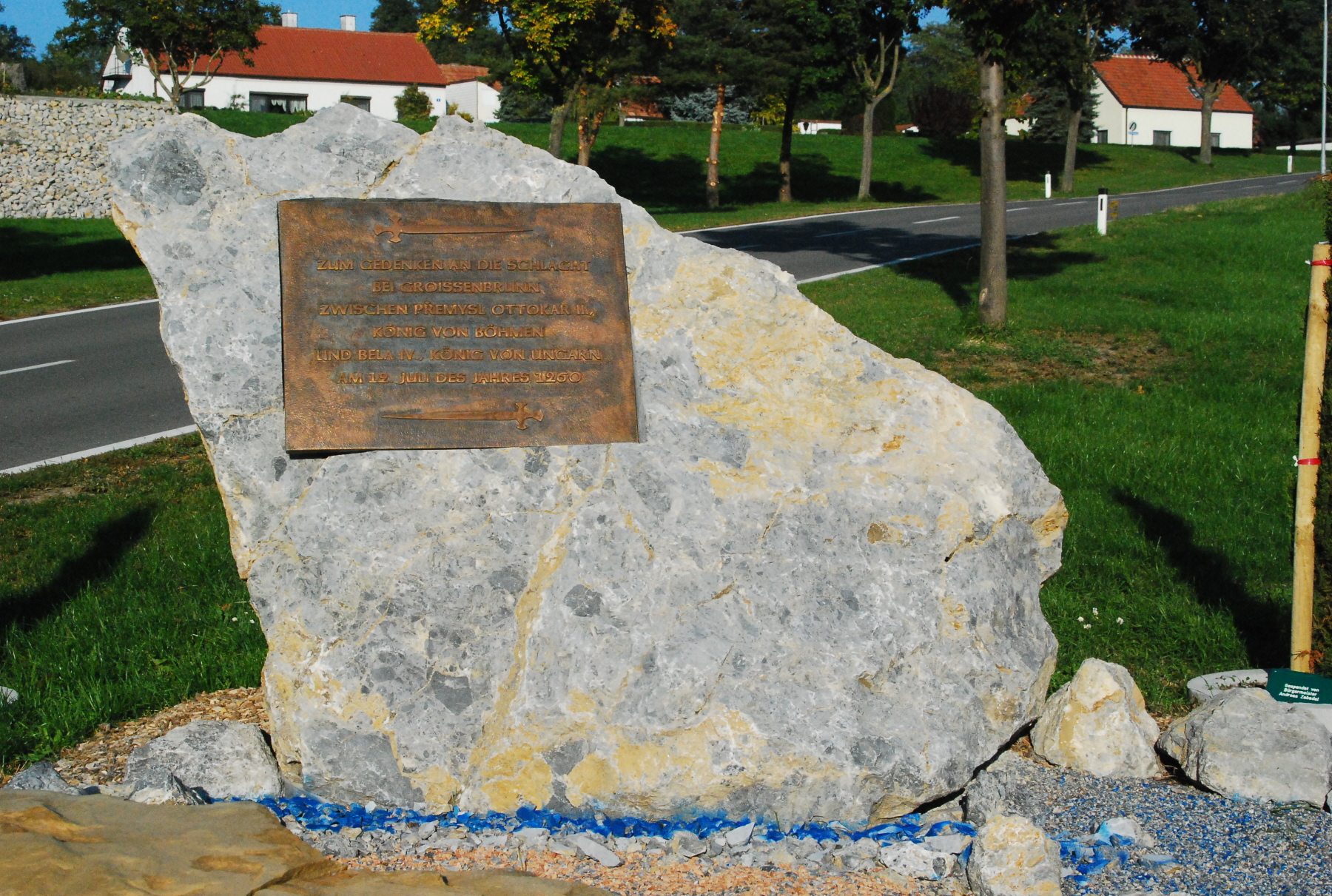
Memorial

The battle is commemorated by a memorial, unveiled in 2010, at the 750th anniversary of the battle. The memorial is located at the eastern edge of the Groissenbrunn municipality, near the road to the Morava river. The author of the memorial plaque's artistic design is Vladislav Plekanec.

== See also ==
- Battle on the Marchfeld
