= Rafolče =

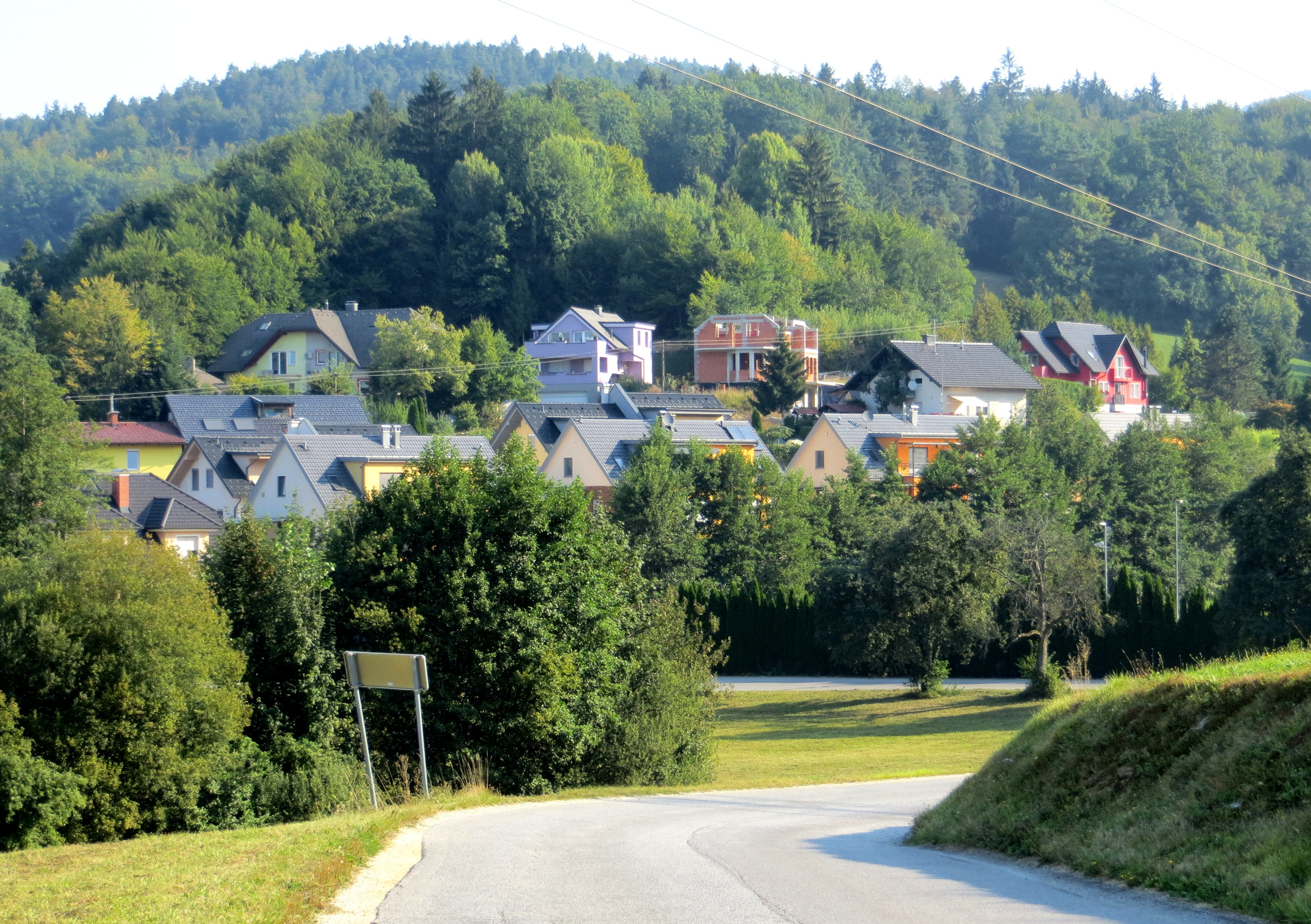

- Location in Slovenia
- Coordinates: 46°10′29.98″N 14°40′33.42″E
- Country: Slovenia
- Traditional region: Upper Carniola
- Statistical region: Central Slovenia
- Municipality: Lukovica

Area
  - Total: 1.15 km^{2} (0.44 sq mi)
- Elevation: 367.4 m (1,205 ft)

Population (2002)
  - Total: 221

Rafolče (pronounced [ˈɾaːfɔltʃɛ] or [ˈɾaːfɔu̯tʃɛ]; German: Rafoltsche) is a village in the Municipality of Lukovica in the eastern part of the Upper Carniola region of Slovenia.

== Name ==
Rafolče was attested in written sources in 1332 as Rauelsdorf (and as Raffolstorff in 1351, Rapholczdorff in 1362, and Raffelsdorf in 1458). Locally, the village is known as Rahovče. The name is originally a plural demonym derived from the Old High German name Rapholt and thus means 'residents of Rapholt's village'.

== Church ==
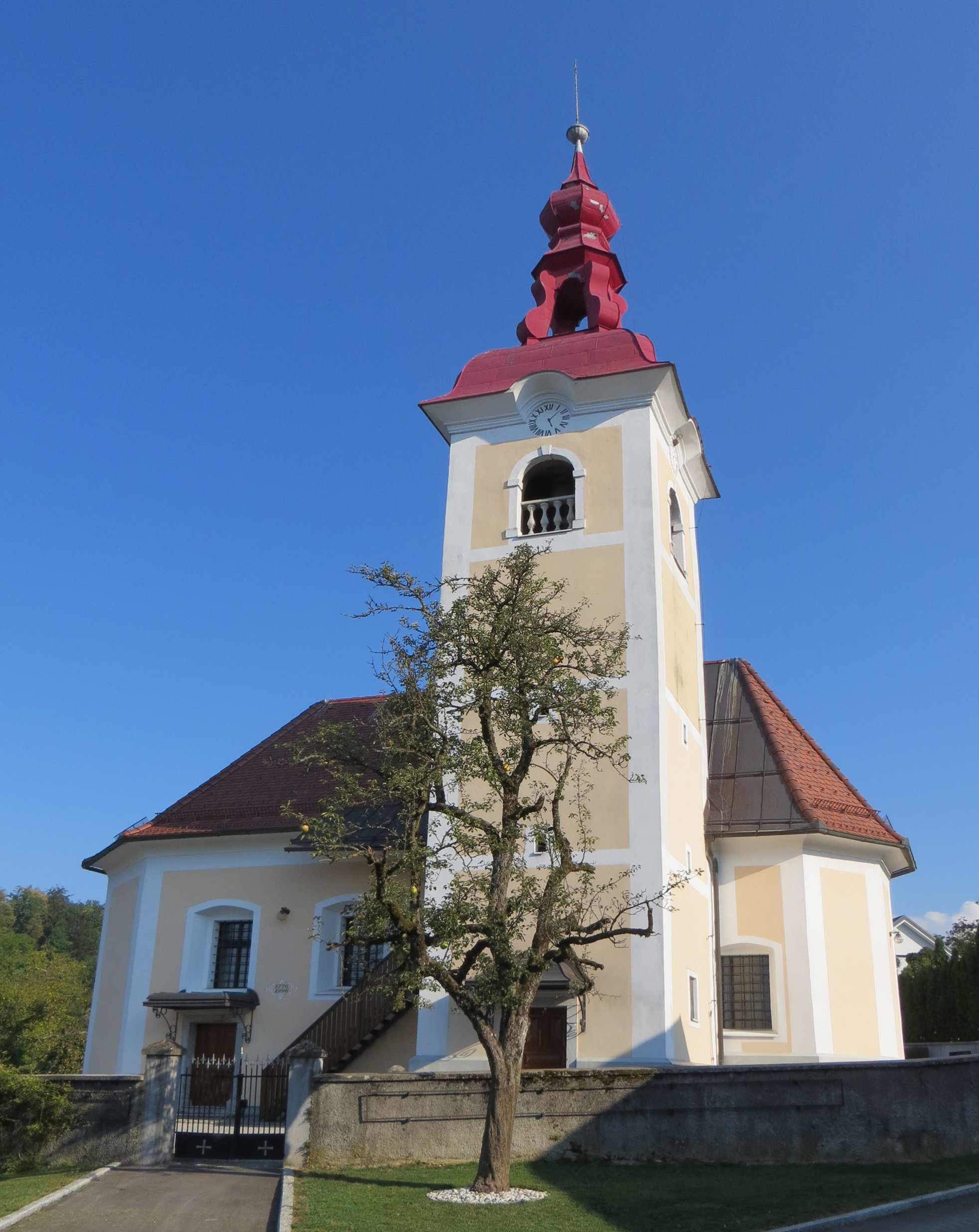
Saint Catherine's Church

The local church is dedicated to Saint Catherine.
