= Prevoje =

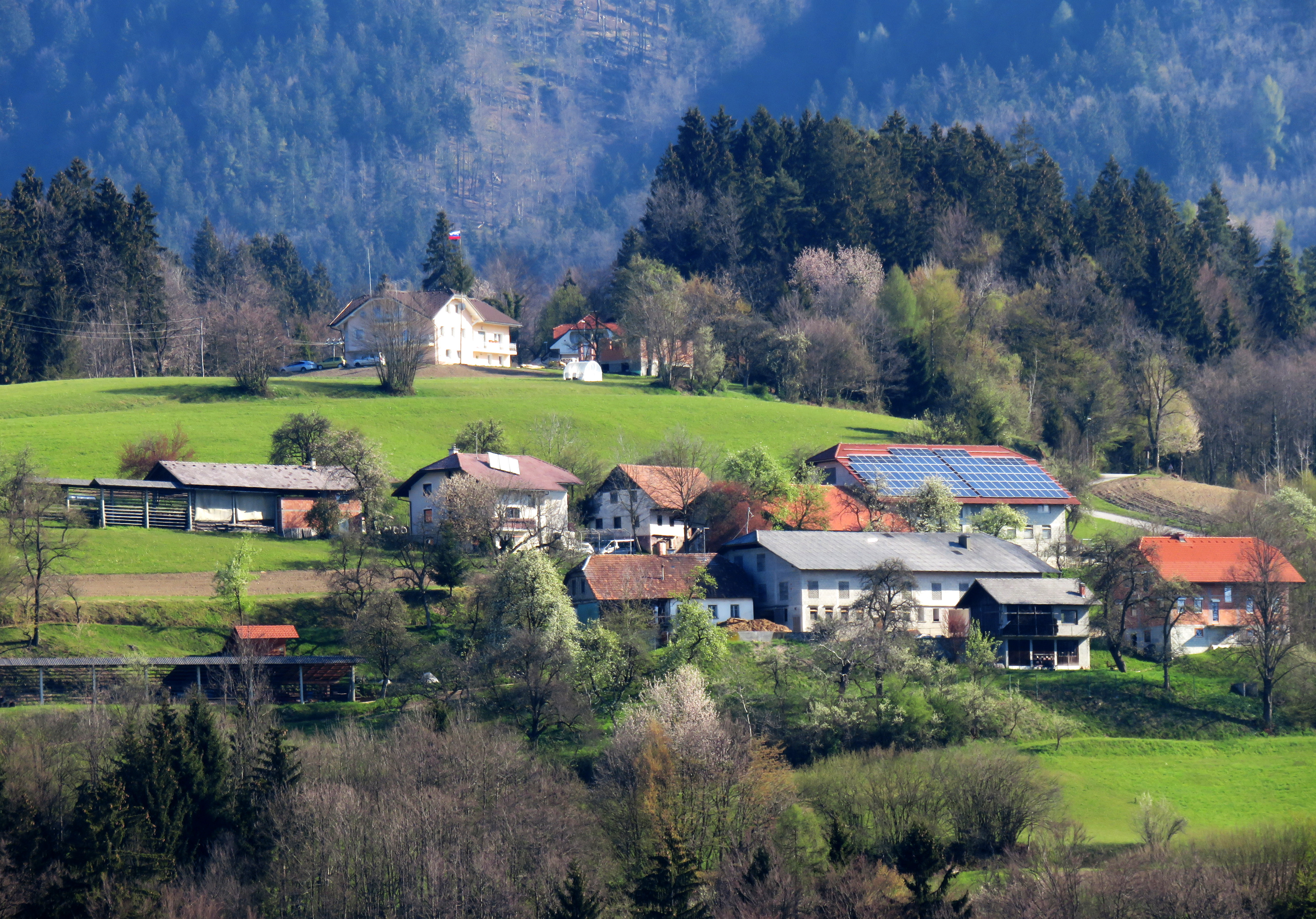

- Location in Slovenia
- Coordinates: 46°10′59.91″N 14°48′51.75″E
- Country: Slovenia
- Traditional region: Upper Carniola
- Statistical region: Central Slovenia
- Municipality: Lukovica

Area
  - Total: 0.74 km^{2} (0.29 sq mi)
- Elevation: 563.4 m (1,848 ft)

Population (2002)
  - Total: 20

Prevoje (pronounced [pɾɛˈʋoːjɛ]) is a small settlement north of Blagovica in the Municipality of Lukovica in the eastern part of the Upper Carniola region of Slovenia.
