= Imovica =

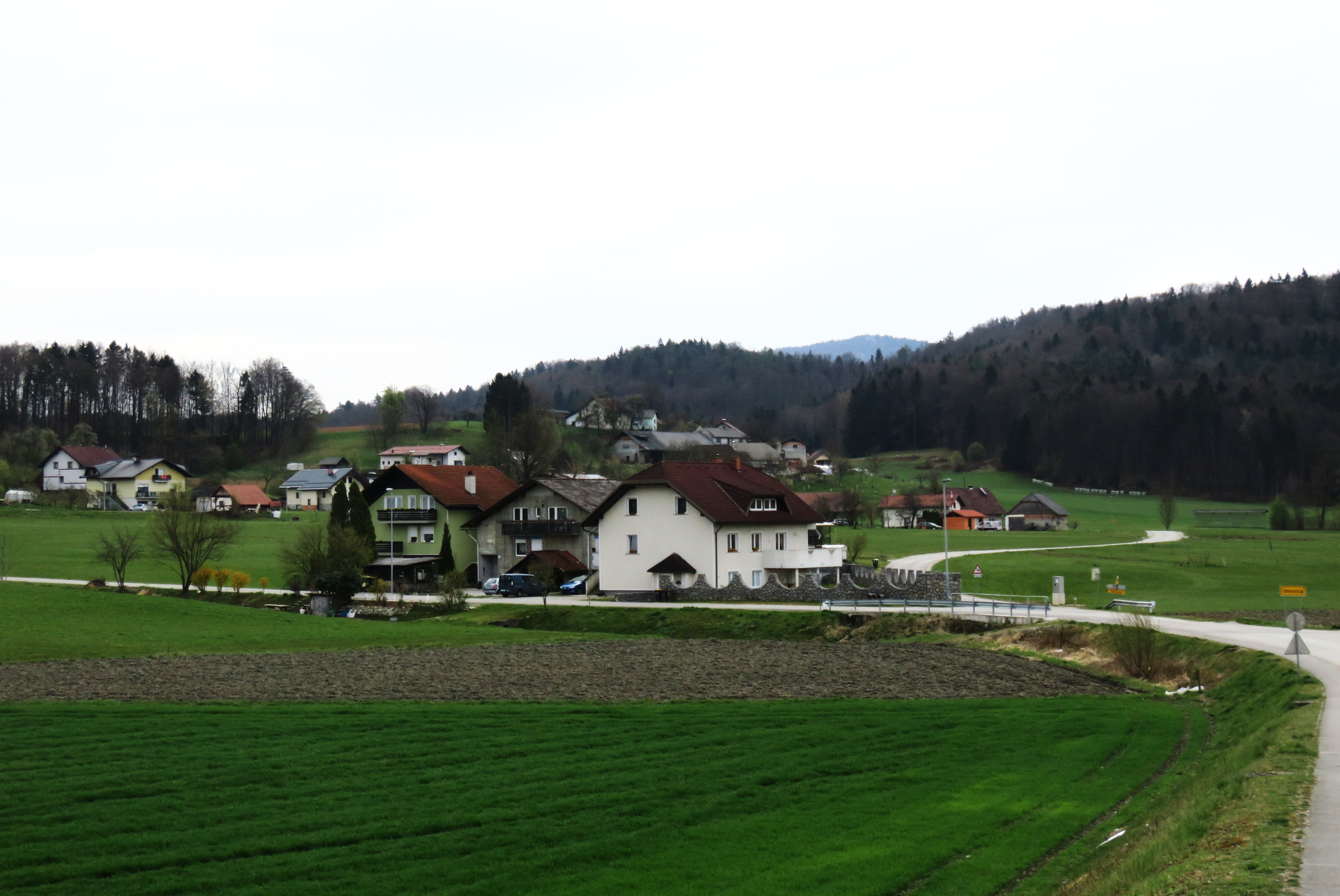

- Location in Slovenia
- Coordinates: 46°9′20.36″N 14°40′40.82″E
- Country: Slovenia
- Traditional region: Upper Carniola
- Statistical region: Central Slovenia
- Municipality: Lukovica

Area
  - Total: 0.9 km^{2} (0.35 sq mi)
- Elevation: 329.4 m (1,081 ft)

Population (2002)
  - Total: 111

Imovica (pronounced [ˈiːmɔʋitsa]) is a small settlement southwest of Lukovica pri Domžalah in the eastern part of the Upper Carniola region of Slovenia.

== Name ==
Imovica was attested in historical sources as Ymowicz in 1385, Hymouicz in 1458, and Ymawetz in 1470, among other spellings. The name is probably related to the noun imovina 'property, possession', referring to its ownership status in the past.
