= Češnjice, Lukovica =

Češnjice
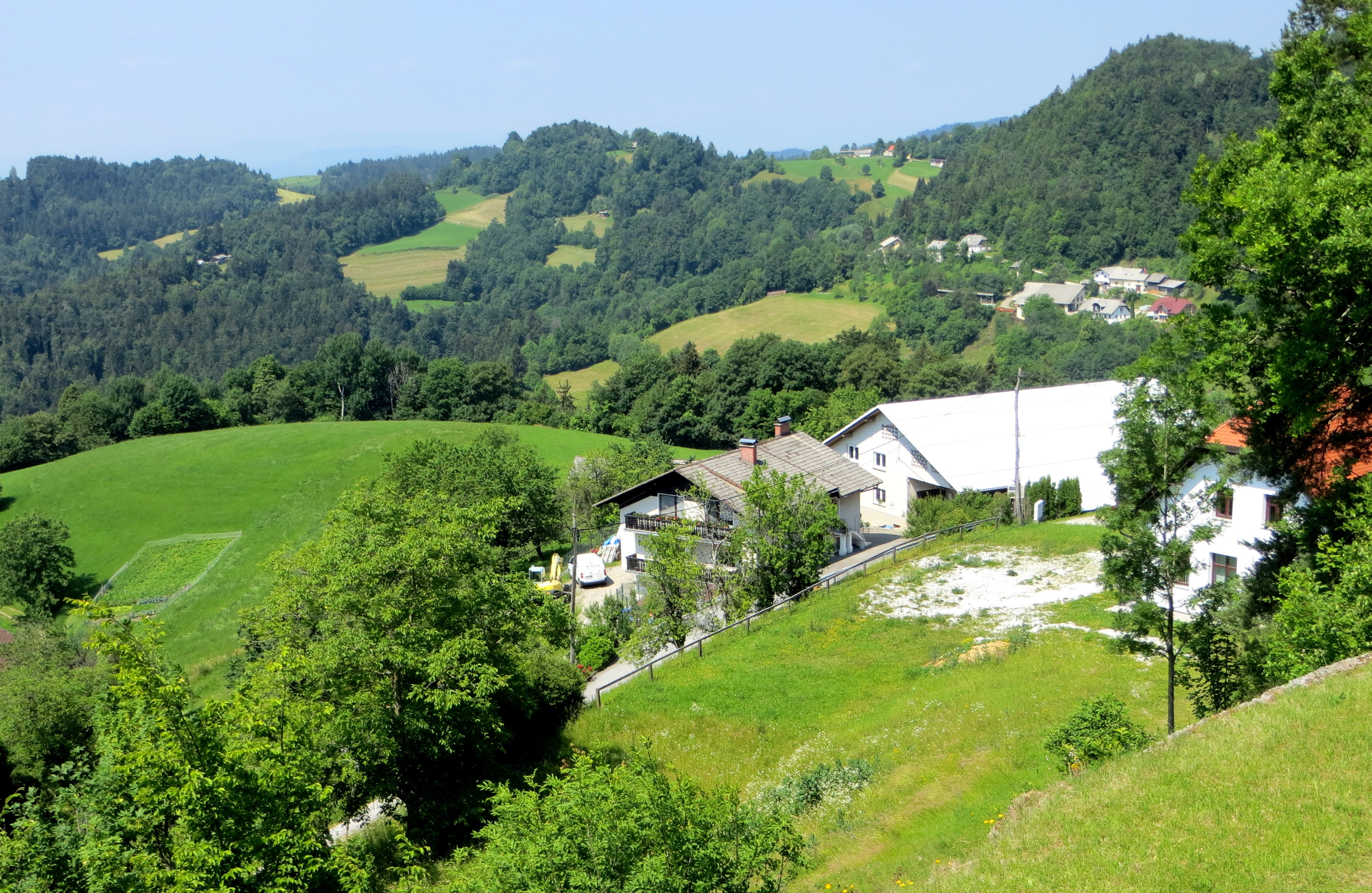

- Location in Slovenia
- Coordinates: 46°11′31.09″N 14°46′33.59″E
- Country: Slovenia
- Traditional region: Upper Carniola
- Statistical region: Central Slovenia
- Municipality: Lukovica

Area
  - Total: 0.89 km^{2} (0.34 sq mi)
- Elevation: 697.6 m (2,289 ft)

Population (2002)
  - Total: 16

Češnjice (pronounced [ˈtʃeːʃnitsɛ]; German: Kerschstetten) is a small village in the Municipality of Lukovica in the eastern part of the Upper Carniola region of Slovenia.

== Church ==
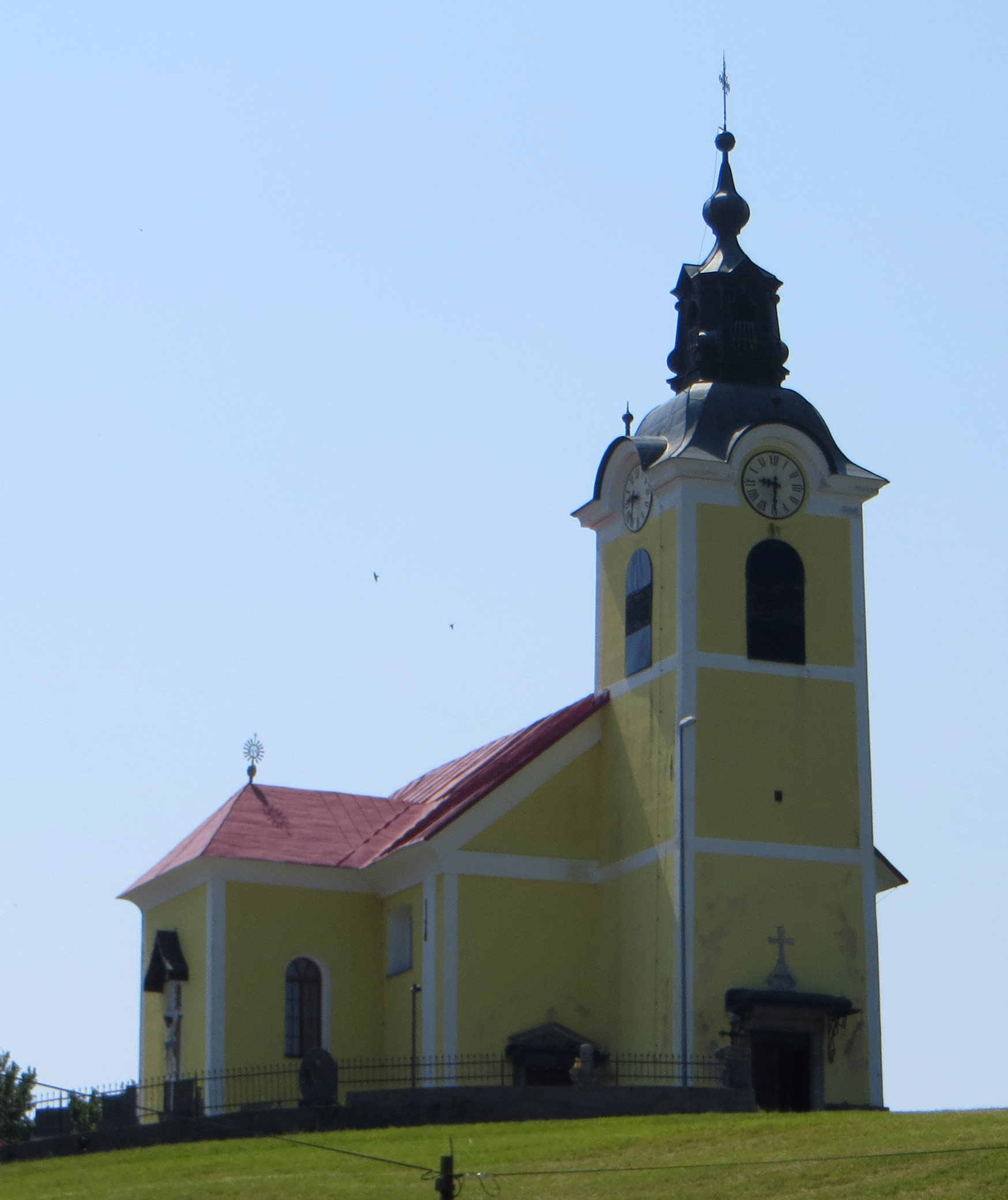
View from north

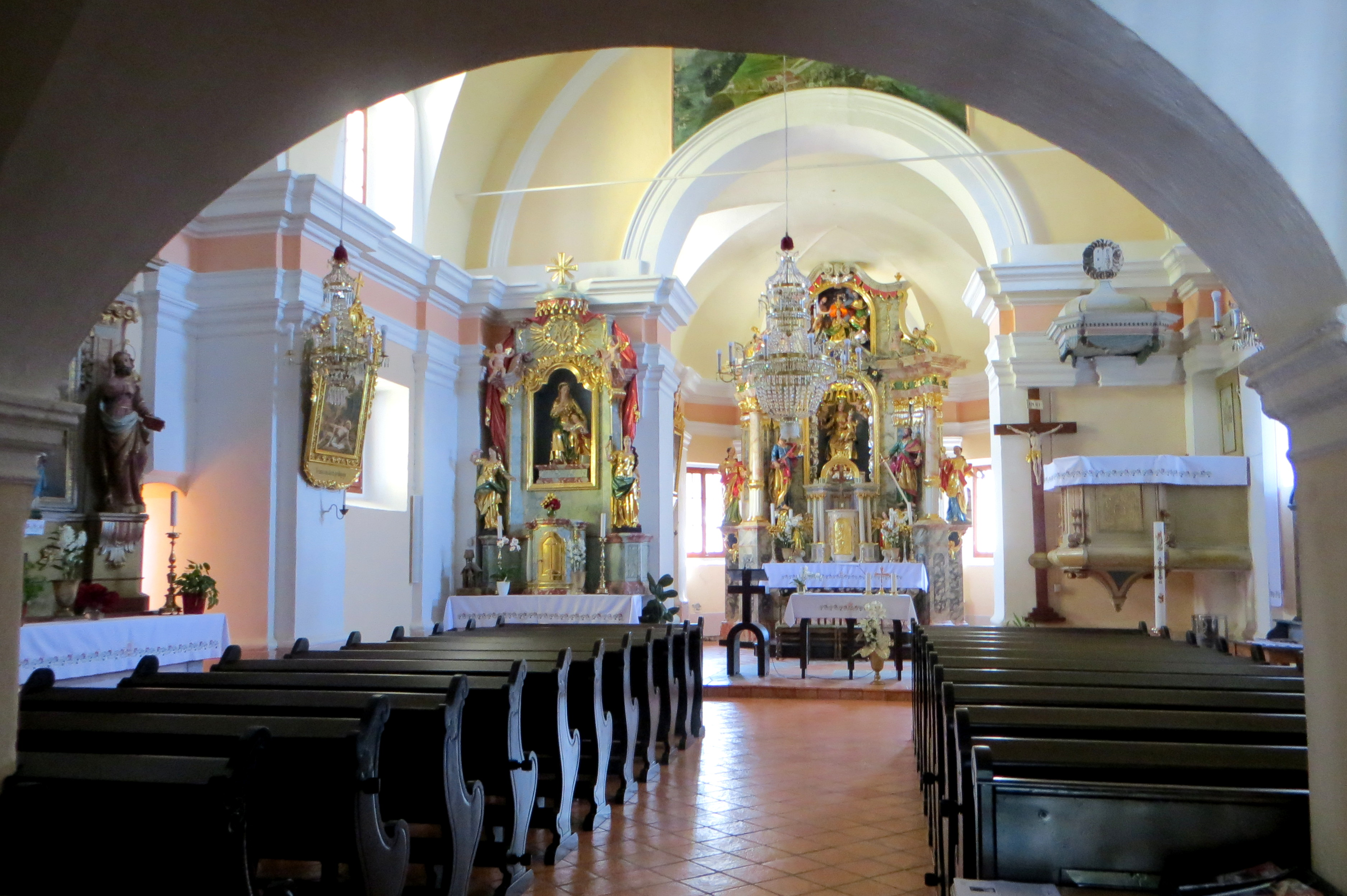
Interior

Our Lady of Mount Carmel Church

The parish church in the settlement is dedicated to Our Lady of Mount Carmel. In the 18th century it was a well-known pilgrimage place.
