= Zlato Polje =

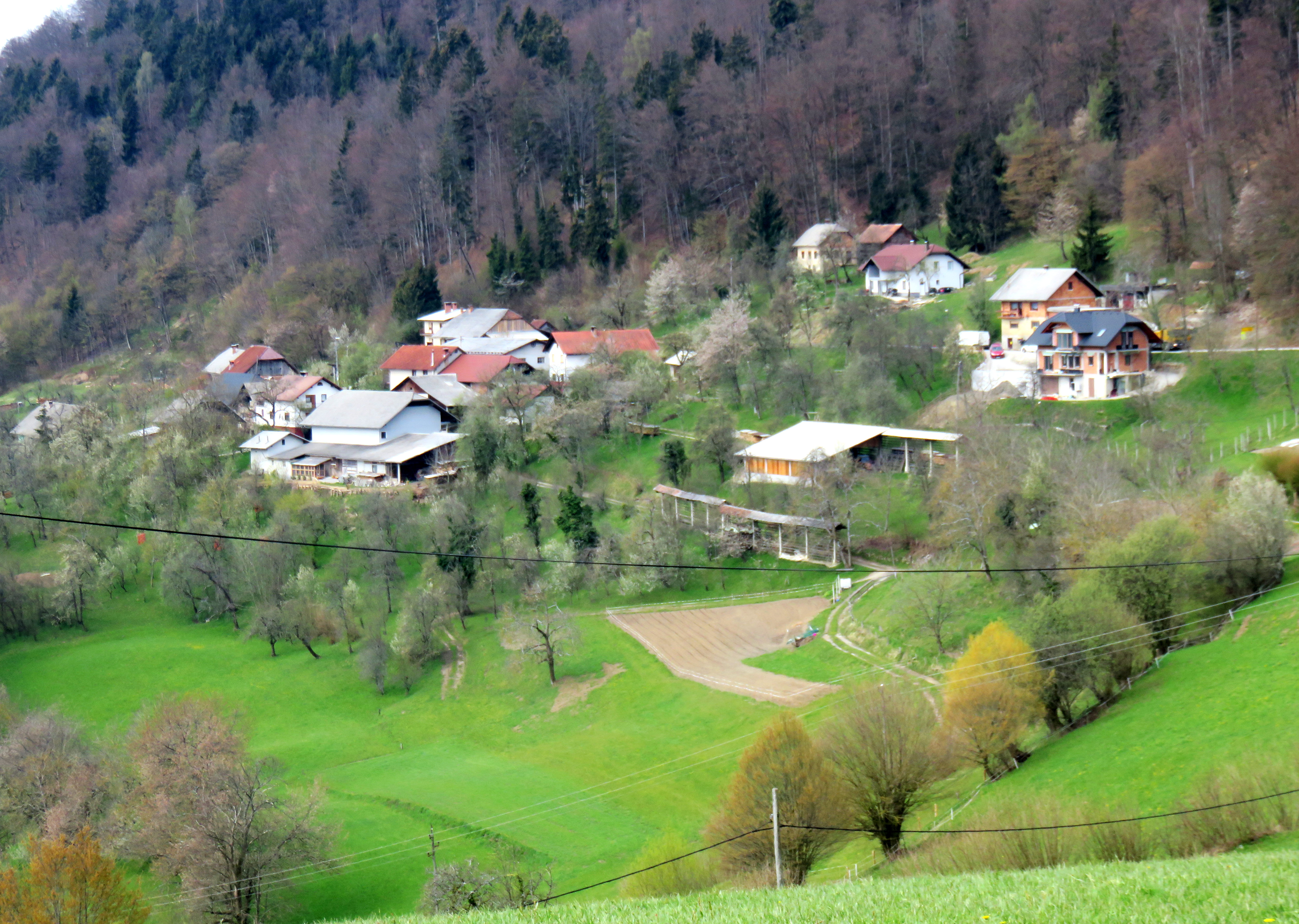

- Location in Slovenia
- Coordinates: 46°11′46.24″N 14°43′30.22″E
- Country: Slovenia
- Traditional region: Upper Carniola
- Statistical region: Central Slovenia
- Municipality: Lukovica

Area
  - Total: 0.94 km^{2} (0.36 sq mi)
- Elevation: 585.5 m (1,921 ft)

Population (2002)
  - Total: 41

Zlato Polje (pronounced [ˈzlàːtɔ ˈpóːljɛ]; German: Goldenfeld) is a small village in the hills above Lukovica pri Domžalah in the eastern part of the Upper Carniola region of Slovenia.
