= Podsmrečje =

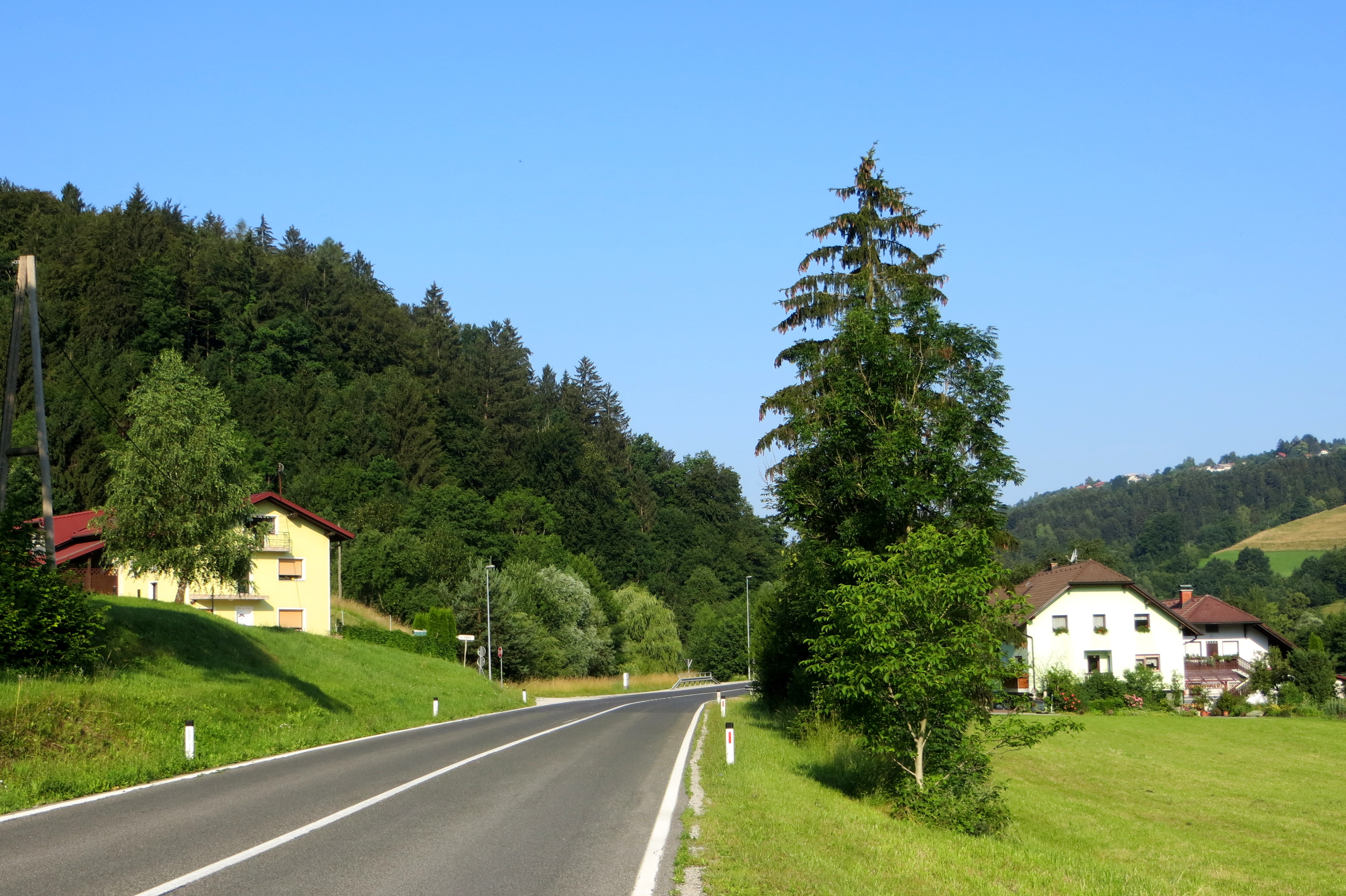

- Location in Slovenia
- Coordinates: 46°10′20.58″N 14°47′26.56″E
- Country: Slovenia
- Traditional region: Upper Carniola
- Statistical region: Central Slovenia
- Municipality: Lukovica

Area
  - Total: 0.74 km^{2} (0.29 sq mi)
- Elevation: 402.7 m (1,321 ft)

Population (2002)
  - Total: 44

Podsmrečje (pronounced [pɔtˈsmɾeːtʃjɛ]) is a small settlement on the main road from Ljubljana to Celje in the Municipality of Lukovica in the eastern part of the Upper Carniola region of Slovenia.
