= Veliki Jelnik =

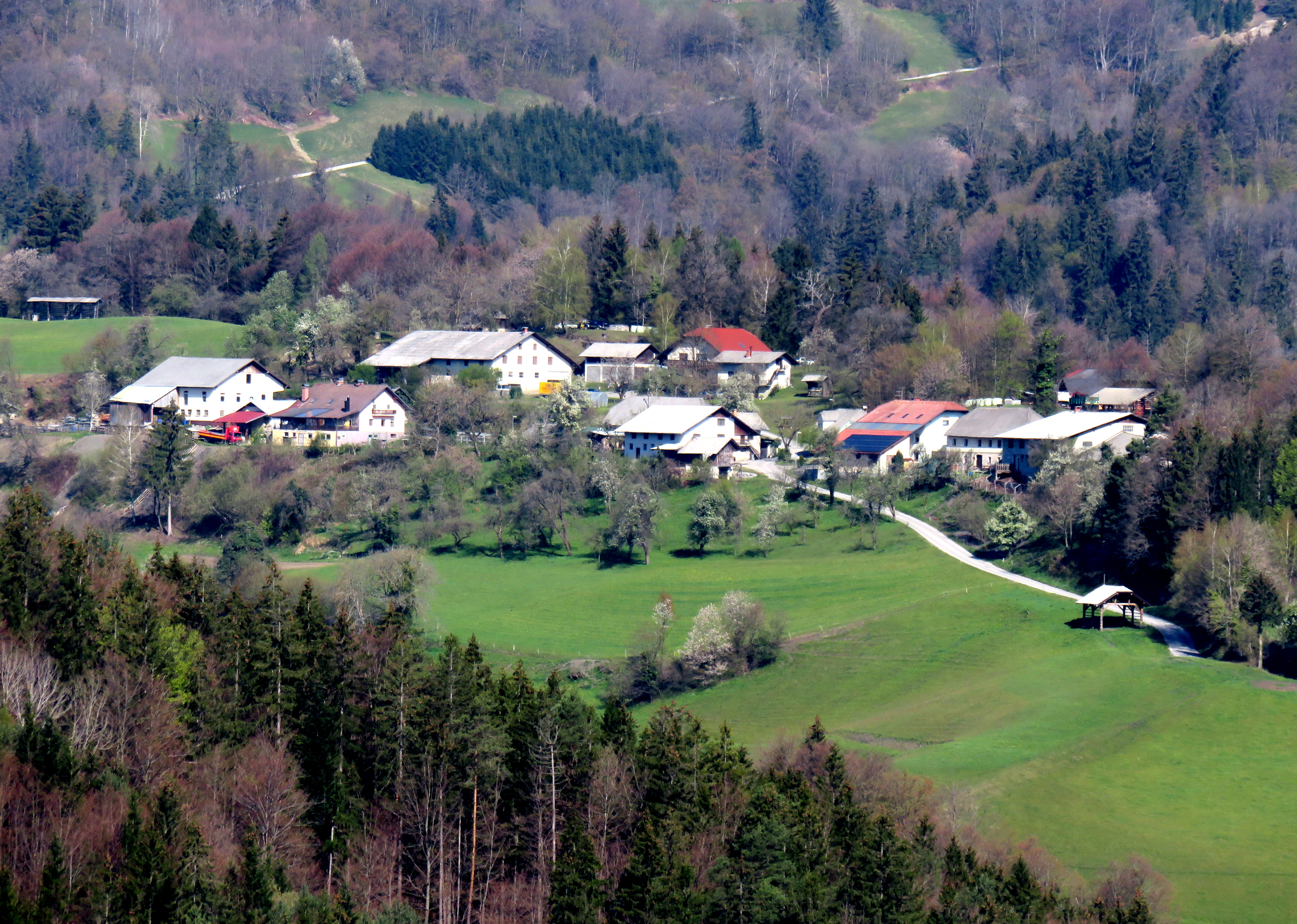

- Location in Slovenia
- Coordinates: 46°11′5.62″N 14°47′37.58″E
- Country: Slovenia
- Traditional region: Upper Carniola
- Statistical region: Central Slovenia
- Municipality: Lukovica

Area
  - Total: 1.21 km^{2} (0.47 sq mi)
- Elevation: 540 m (1,770 ft)

Population (2002)
  - Total: 22

Veliki Jelnik (pronounced [ˈʋeːliki ˈjeːu̯nik]; German: Großjeunig) is a small settlement above Blagovica in the Municipality of Lukovica in central Slovenia.
