= Golčaj =

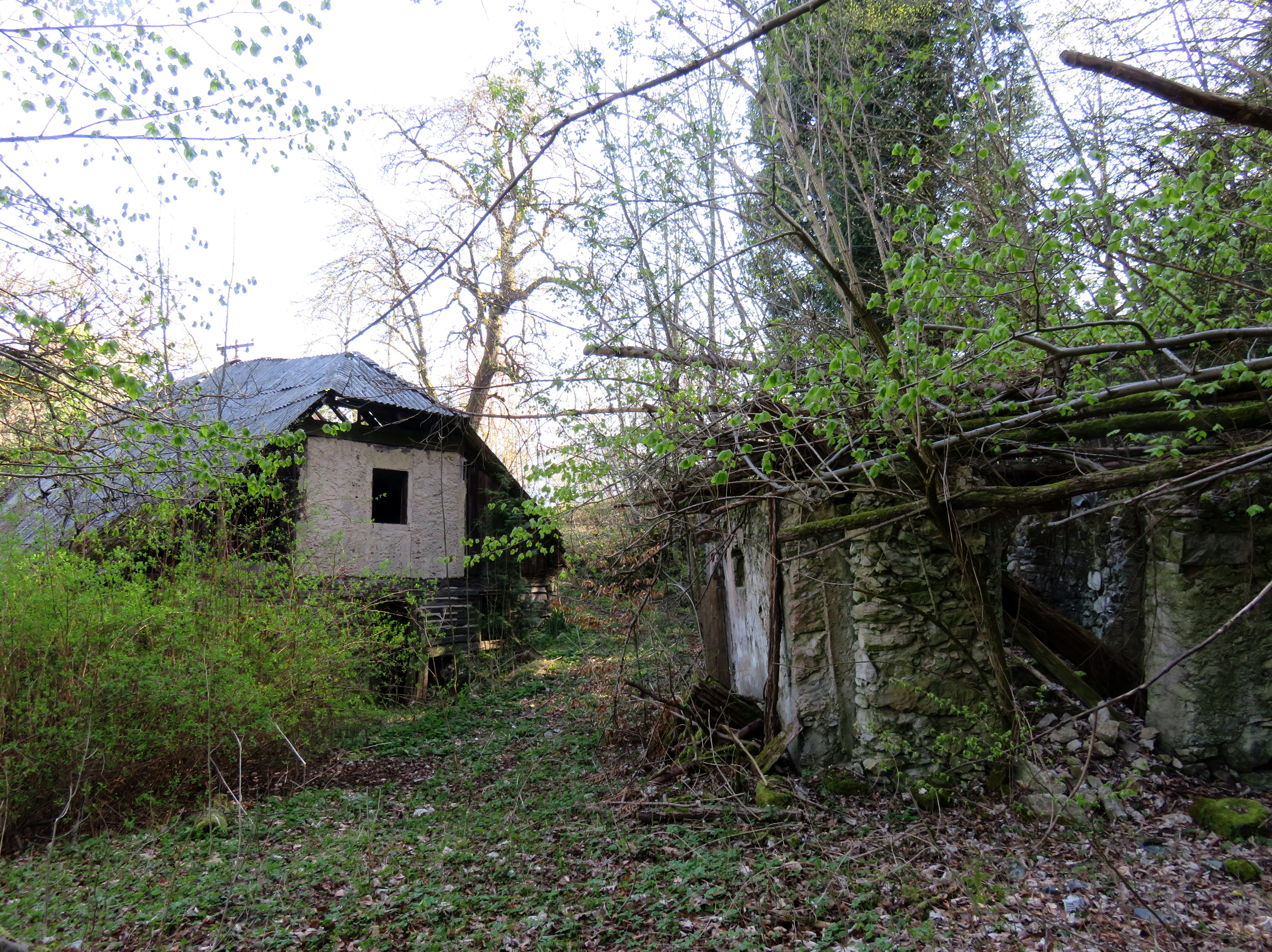
- The abandoned Golkar farm in Golčaj

- Location in Slovenia
- Coordinates: 46°10′12.92″N 14°48′32.79″E
- Country: Slovenia
- Traditional region: Upper Carniola
- Statistical region: Central Slovenia
- Municipality: Lukovica

Area
  - Total: 2.64 km^{2} (1.02 sq mi)
- Elevation: 649.2 m (2,130 ft)

Population (2013)
  - Total: no permanent residents

Golčaj (pronounced [ɡɔlˈtʃaːi̯]) is a small settlement south of Blagovica in the Municipality of Lukovica in the eastern part of the Upper Carniola region of Slovenia. It has no permanent residents.

== Name ==
Golčaj was attested in written sources as Goltschach in 1437 and Gulczach in 1444.

== Church ==
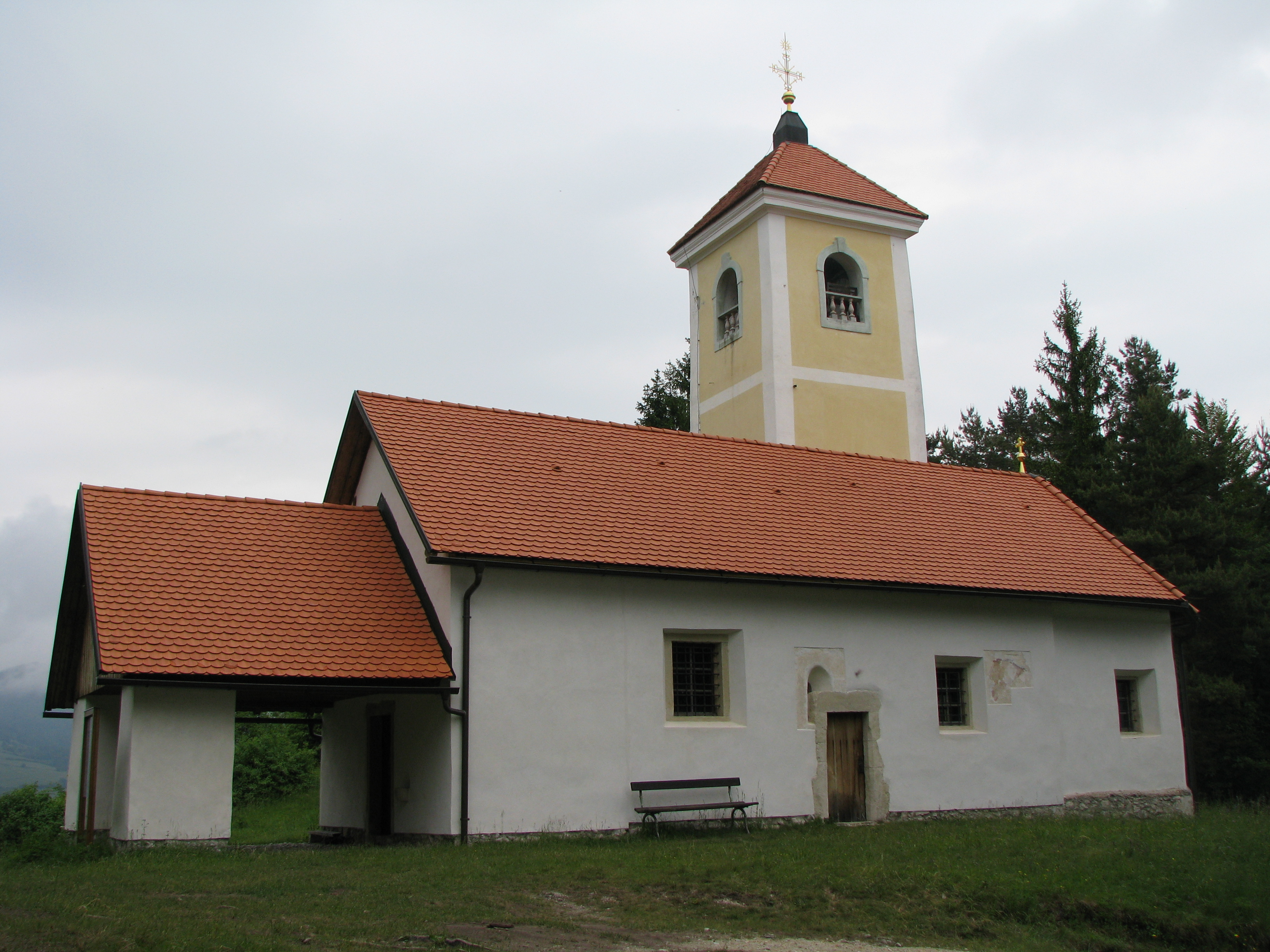
St. Agnes's Church in Golčaj

The local church is built on a hill above the settlement and is dedicated to Saint Agnes (Slovene: sveta Neža). It is the oldest church in the area and was first mentioned in documents dating to 1526. Its wooden coffered ceiling dates to 1680 and was restored in 1990. The main altar is from 1858.
