= Spodnje Loke =

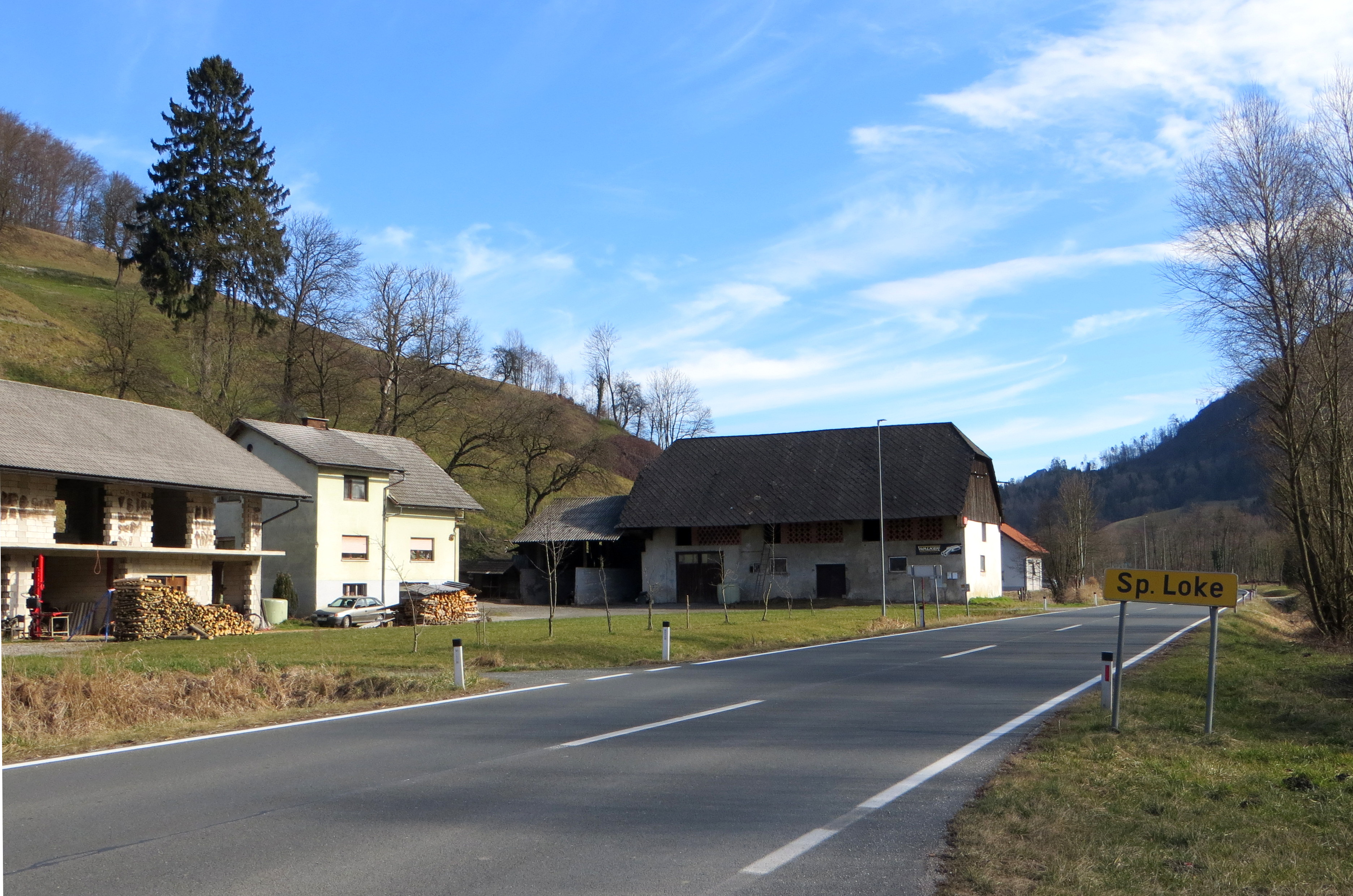

- Location in Slovenia
- Coordinates: 46°10′1.93″N 14°45′51.99″E
- Country: Slovenia
- Traditional region: Upper Carniola
- Statistical region: Central Slovenia
- Municipality: Lukovica

Area
  - Total: 1.09 km^{2} (0.42 sq mi)
- Elevation: 380.5 m (1,248 ft)

Population (2002)
  - Total: 106

Spodnje Loke (pronounced [ˈspoːdnjɛ ˈloːkɛ] or [ˈspoːdnjɛ ˈlɔːkɛ], in older sources simply Loke) is a settlement east of Krašnja on the main road from Ljubljana to Celje in the eastern part of the Upper Carniola region of Slovenia. It is in the Municipality of Lukovica.
