= Mala Lašna =

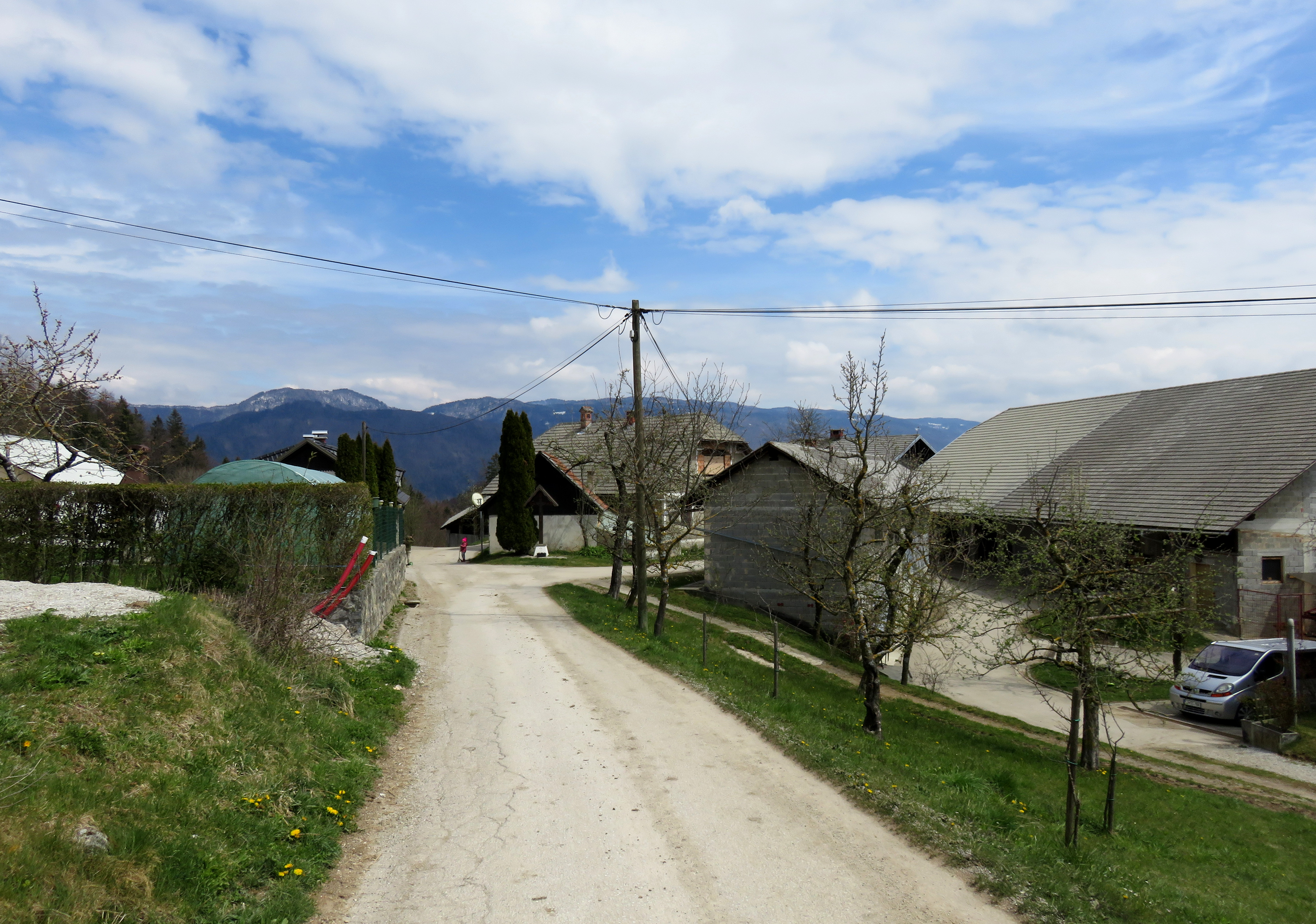

- Location in Slovenia
- Coordinates: 46°11′46.82″N 14°43′1.3″E
- Country: Slovenia
- Traditional region: Upper Carniola
- Statistical region: Central Slovenia
- Municipality: Lukovica

Area
  - Total: 1.39 km^{2} (0.54 sq mi)
- Elevation: 696.6 m (2,285 ft)

Population (2002)
  - Total: 31

Mala Lašna (pronounced [ˈmaːla ˈlaːʃna]; in older sources also Mala Lašina, German: Kleinlaschna) is a small village in the hills north of Lukovica pri Domžalah, in the eastern part of the Upper Carniola region of Slovenia.
