= Vošce =

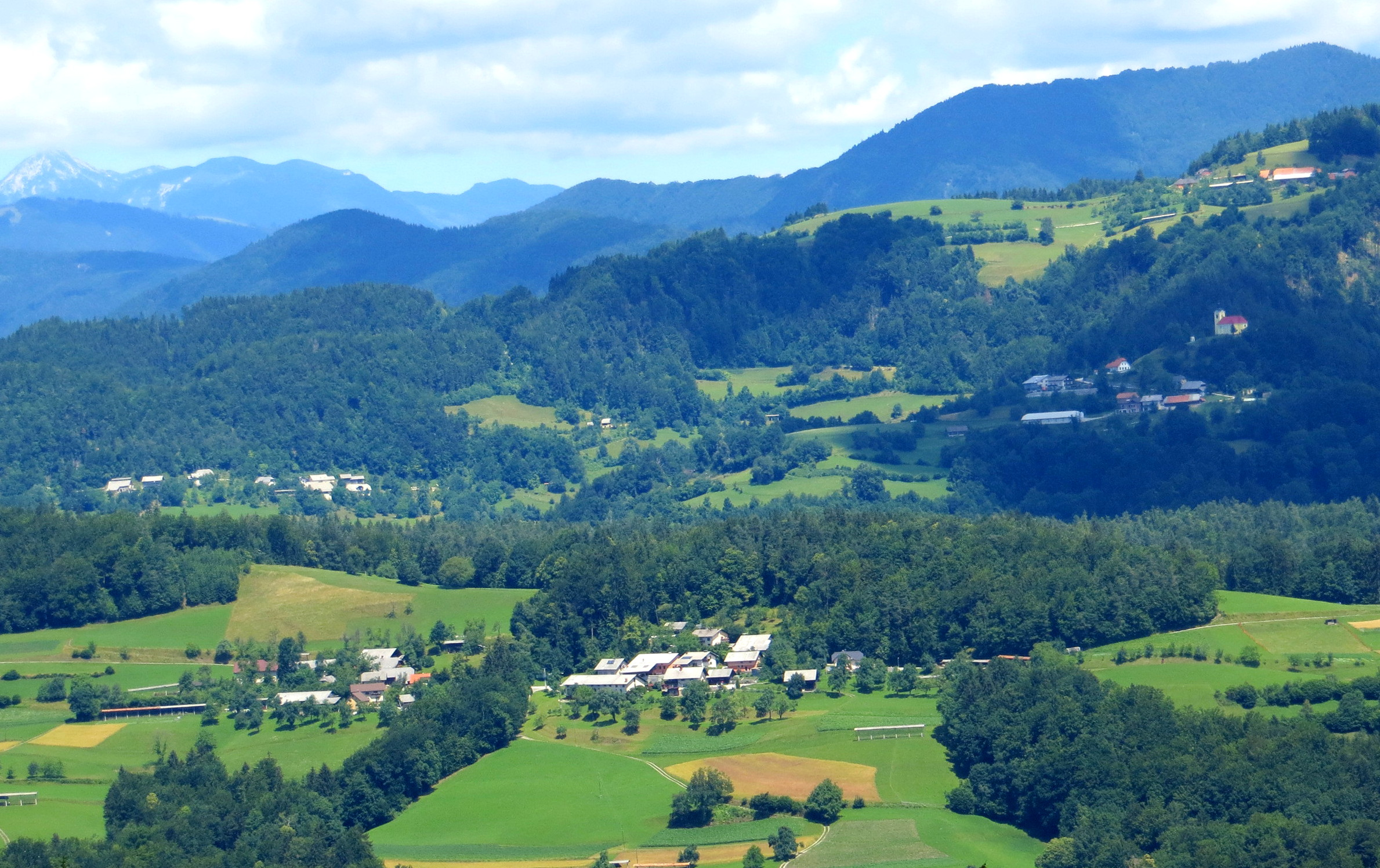

- Location in Slovenia
- Coordinates: 46°10′47.04″N 14°46′33.77″E
- Country: Slovenia
- Traditional region: Upper Carniola
- Statistical region: Central Slovenia
- Municipality: Lukovica

Area
  - Total: 1.14 km^{2} (0.44 sq mi)
- Elevation: 584.3 m (1,917 ft)

Population (2002)
  - Total: 54

Vošce (pronounced [ˈʋoːʃtsɛ]) is a small settlement northwest of Blagovica in the Municipality of Lukovica in Central Slovenia.
