= Vrba, Lukovica =

Vrba
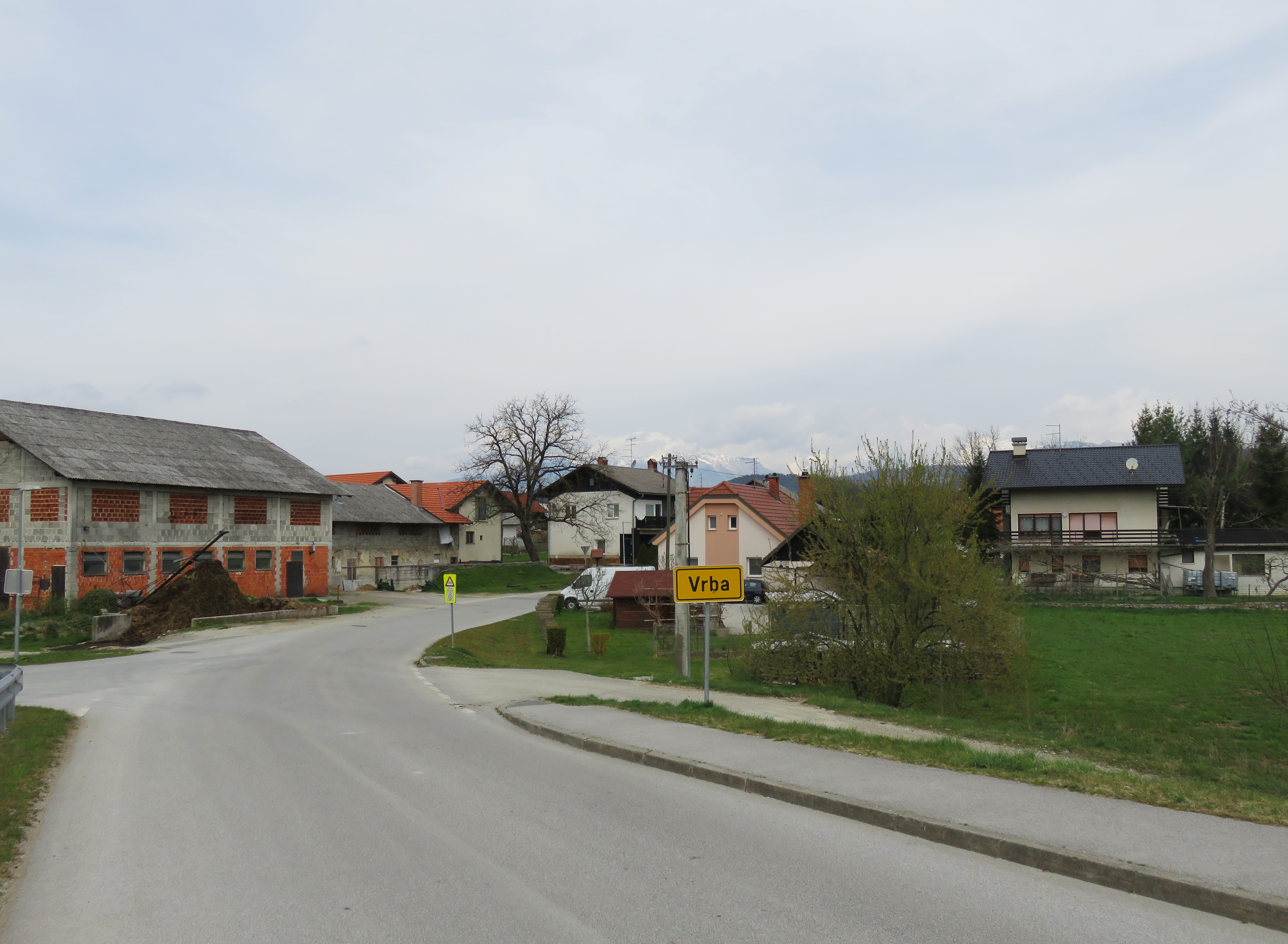

- Location in Slovenia
- Coordinates: 46°9′26.44″N 14°40′11.88″E
- Country: Slovenia
- Traditional region: Upper Carniola
- Statistical region: Central Slovenia
- Municipality: Lukovica

Area
  - Total: 0.57 km^{2} (0.22 sq mi)
- Elevation: 320.8 m (1,052 ft)

Population (2002)
  - Total: 84

Vrba (pronounced [ˈʋəɾba]; German: Felbern) is a small village in the Municipality of Lukovica in the eastern part of the Upper Carniola region of Slovenia.
