= Municipality of Lukovica =

Municipality of Slovenia

Municipality of Lukovica Občina Lukovica
- Municipality
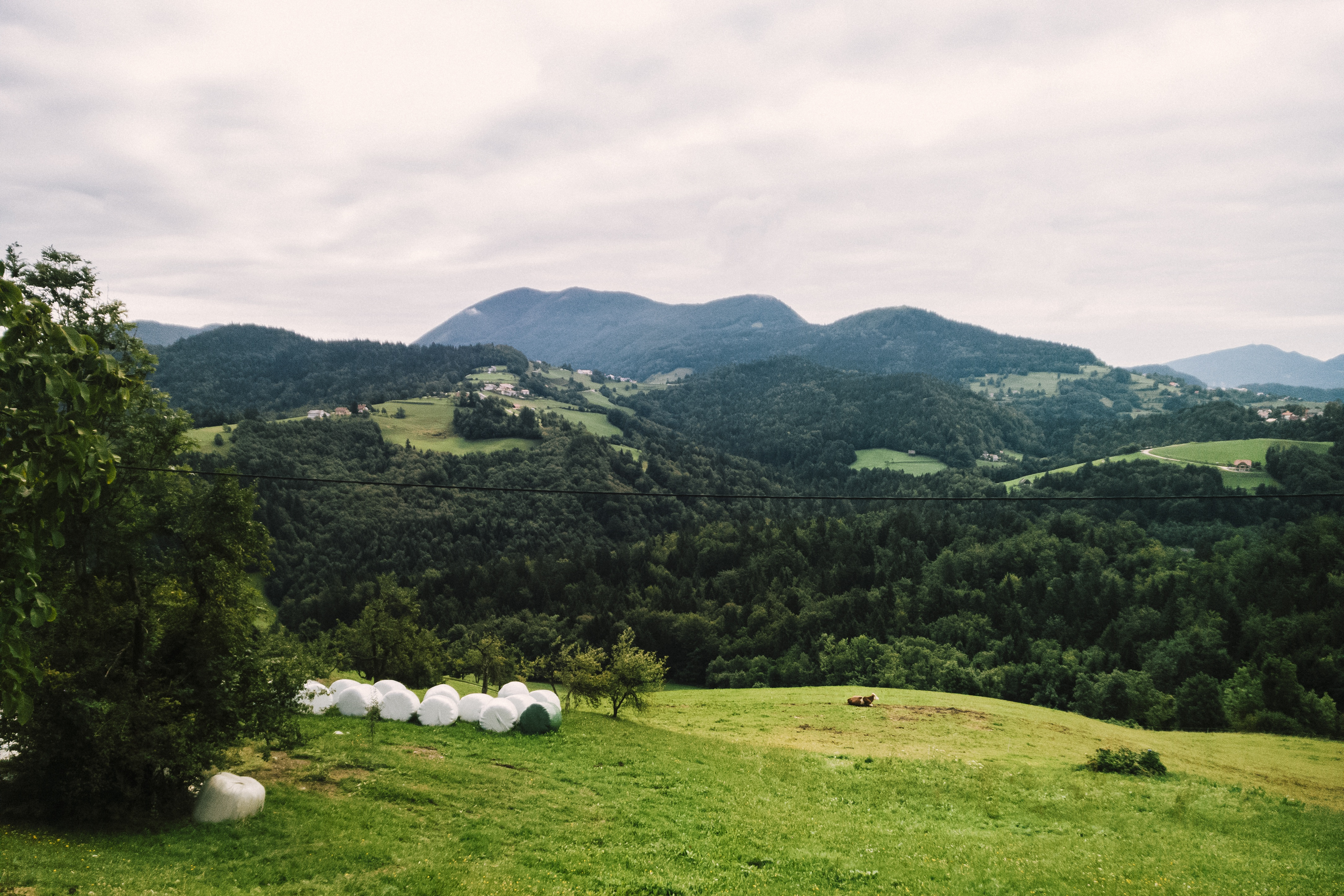

- Location of the Municipality of Lukovica in Slovenia
- Coordinates: 46°10′N 14°42′E
- Country: Slovenia

Government
  - Mayor: Olga Vrankar (Independent)

Area
  - Total: 74.9 km^{2} (28.9 sq mi)

Population (2021)
  - Total: 5,888
  - Density: 78.6/km^{2} (204/sq mi)
- Time zone: UTC+01 (CET)
  - Summer (DST): UTC+02 (CEST)
- Website: www.lukovica.si

The Municipality of Lukovica (pronounced [ˈluːkɔʋitsa]; Slovene: Občina Lukovica) is a municipality in the eastern part of the Upper Carniola region in Slovenia. The seat of the municipality is Lukovica pri Domžalah. It lies on the main road from Ljubljana to Celje and has been an independent municipality since 1994.

== Settlements ==
In addition to the municipal seat of Lukovica pri Domžalah, the municipality also includes the following settlements:

- Blagovica
- Brdo pri Lukovici
- Brezovica pri Zlatem Polju
- Bršlenovica
- Čeplje
- Češnjice
- Dupeljne
- Gabrje pod Špilkom
- Golčaj
- Gorenje
- Gradišče pri Lukovici
- Hribi
- Imovica
- Javorje pri Blagovici
- Jelša
- Kompolje
- Koreno
- Korpe
- Krajno Brdo
- Krašnja
- Lipa
- Log
- Mala Lašna
- Mali Jelnik
- Obrše
- Podgora pri Zlatem Polju
- Podmilj
- Podsmrečje
- Poljane nad Blagovico
- Preserje pri Lukovici
- Preserje pri Zlatem Polju
- Prevalje
- Prevoje
- Prevoje pri Šentvidu
- Prilesje
- Prvine
- Rafolče
- Selce
- Šentožbolt
- Šentvid pri Lukovici
- Spodnje Koseze
- Spodnje Loke
- Spodnje Prapreče
- Spodnji Petelinjek
- Straža
- Suša
- Trnjava
- Trnovče
- Trojane
- Učak
- V Zideh
- Veliki Jelnik
- Videm pri Lukovici
- Vošce
- Vranke
- Vrba
- Vrh nad Krašnjo
- Vrhovlje
- Zavrh pri Trojanah
- Zgornje Loke
- Zgornje Prapreče
- Zgornji Petelinjek
- Žirovše
- Zlatenek
- Zlato Polje
