= Zgornje Loke =

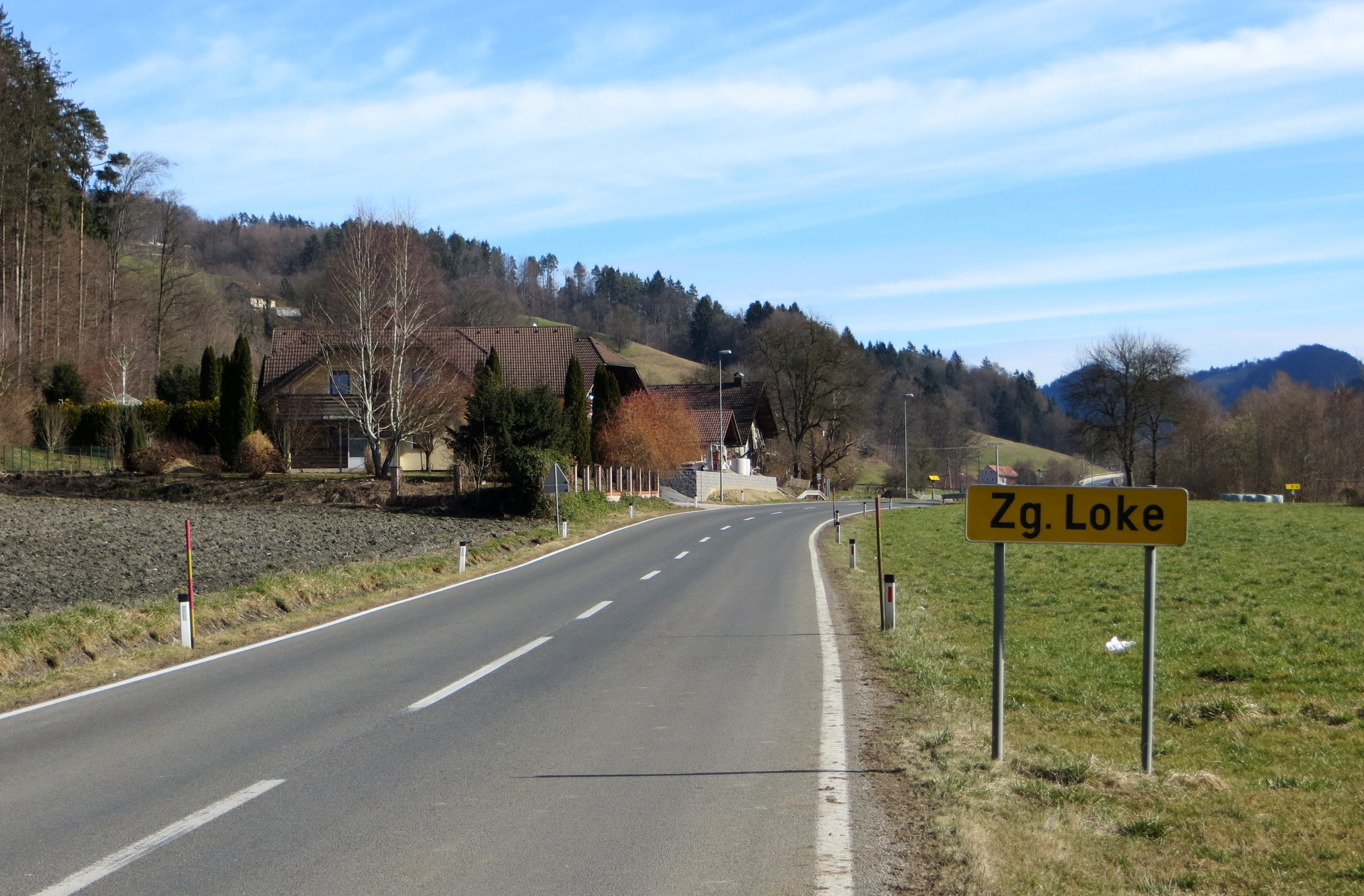

- Location in Slovenia
- Coordinates: 46°10′23.11″N 14°46′54.85″E
- Country: Slovenia
- Traditional region: Upper Carniola
- Statistical region: Central Slovenia
- Municipality: Lukovica

Area
  - Total: 0.63 km^{2} (0.24 sq mi)
- Elevation: 396.2 m (1,300 ft)

Population (2002)
  - Total: 101

Zgornje Loke (pronounced [ˈzɡoːɾnjɛ ˈloːkɛ] or [ˈzɡoːɾnjɛ ˈlɔːkɛ]; German: Oberloke) is a settlement in the Municipality of Lukovica in the eastern part of the Upper Carniola region of Slovenia. It lies on the main road from Ljubljana to Celje.
