= Bršlenovica =

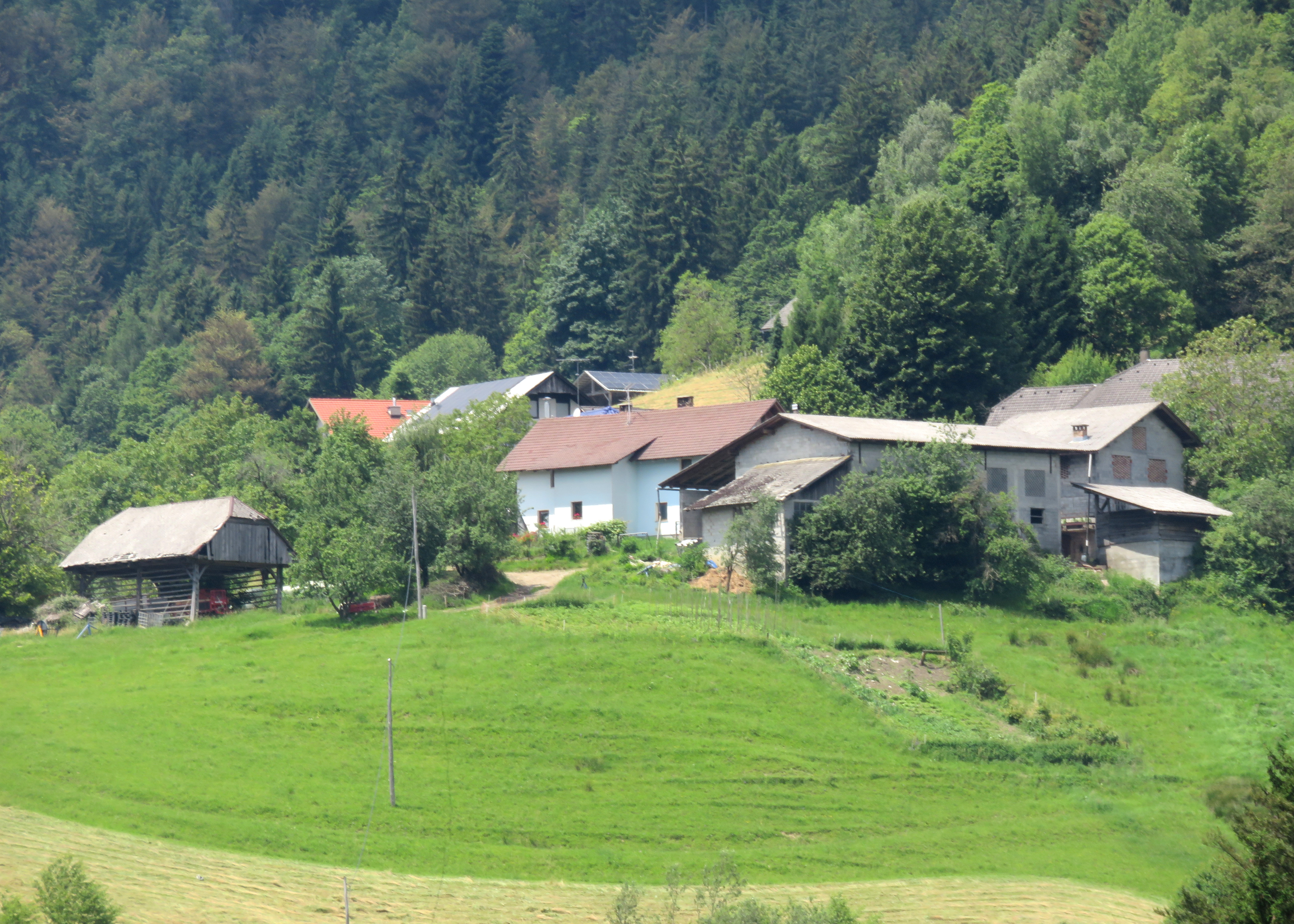

- Location in Slovenia
- Coordinates: 46°11′21.85″N 14°51′36.31″E
- Country: Slovenia
- Traditional region: Upper Carniola
- Statistical region: Central Slovenia
- Municipality: Lukovica

Area
  - Total: 0.74 km^{2} (0.29 sq mi)
- Elevation: 634.1 m (2,080 ft)

Population (2002)
  - Total: 22

Bršlenovica (pronounced [bəɾˈʃleːnɔʋitsa]) is a small settlement in the hills west of Trojane in the Municipality of Lukovica in the eastern part of the Upper Carniola region of Slovenia.
