= Zgornje Prapreče =

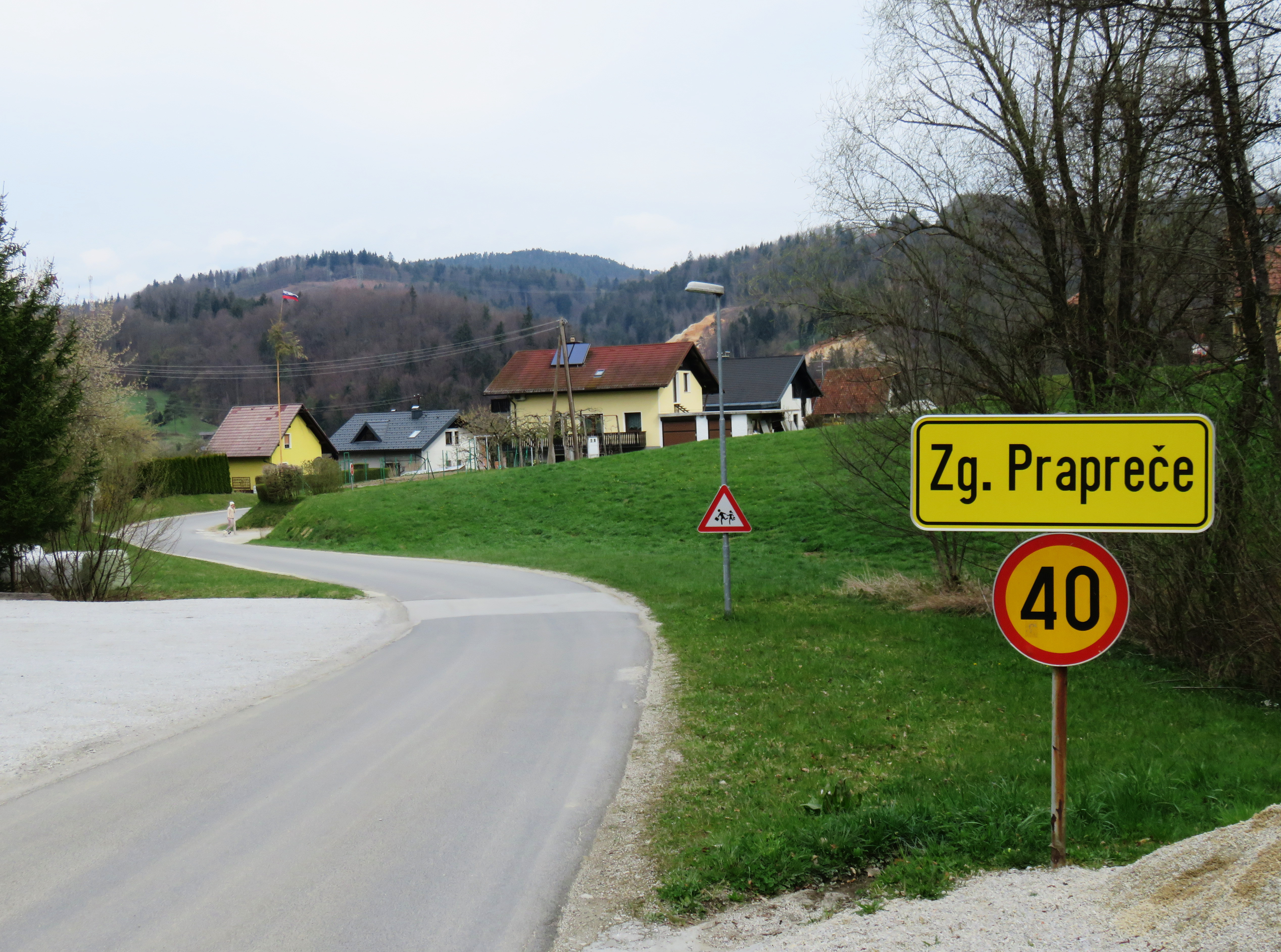

- Location in Slovenia
- Coordinates: 46°10′2.99″N 14°41′53.76″E
- Country: Slovenia
- Traditional region: Upper Carniola
- Statistical region: Central Slovenia
- Municipality: Lukovica

Area
  - Total: 0.23 km^{2} (0.089 sq mi)
- Elevation: 349.7 m (1,147 ft)

Population (2002)
  - Total: 35

Zgornje Prapreče (pronounced [ˈzɡoːɾnjɛ ˈpɾaːpɾɛtʃɛ]; German: Oberprapretsch) is a small settlement near Lukovica pri Domžalah in the eastern part of the Upper Carniola region of Slovenia.
