= Vrh nad Krašnjo =

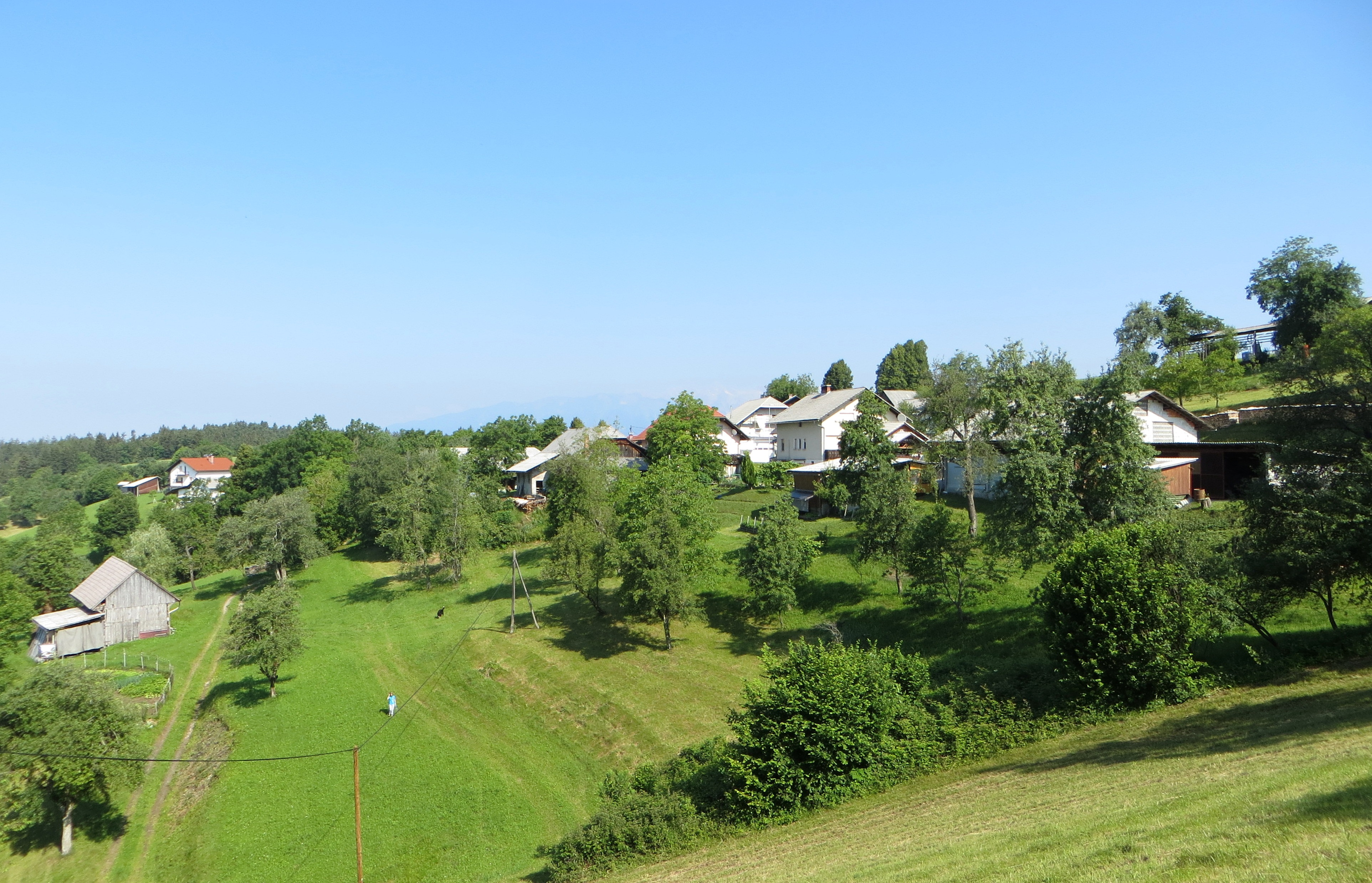

- Location in Slovenia
- Coordinates: 46°11′9.23″N 14°45′14.4″E
- Country: Slovenia
- Traditional region: Upper Carniola
- Statistical region: Central Slovenia
- Municipality: Lukovica

Area
  - Total: 2.48 km^{2} (0.96 sq mi)
- Elevation: 681.2 m (2,235 ft)

Population (2002)
  - Total: 53

Vrh nad Krašnjo (pronounced [ˈʋəɾx nat ˈkɾaːʃnɔ]) is a small settlement on a hill above Krašnja in the Municipality of Lukovica in the eastern part of the Upper Carniola region of Slovenia.

== Name ==
The name of the settlement was changed from Vrh to Vrh nad Krašnjo in 1955.
