= Korpe =

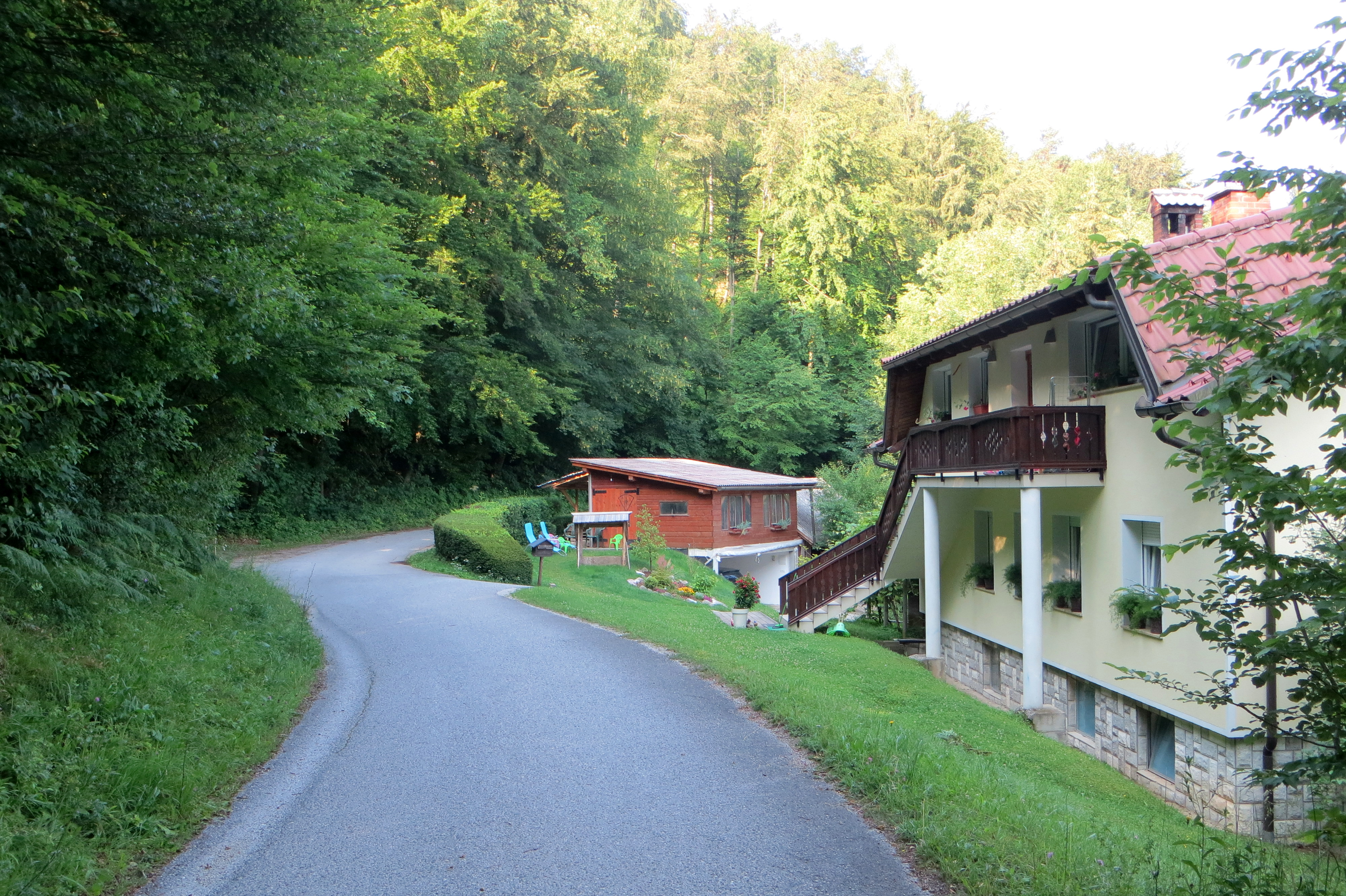

- Location in Slovenia
- Coordinates: 46°10′6.3″N 14°47′12.16″E
- Country: Slovenia
- Traditional region: Upper Carniola
- Statistical region: Central Slovenia
- Municipality: Lukovica

Area
  - Total: 0.84 km^{2} (0.32 sq mi)
- Elevation: 508.4 m (1,668 ft)

Population (2002)
  - Total: 13

Korpe (pronounced [ˈkoːɾpɛ]) is a small settlement in the hills southwest of Blagovica in the Municipality of Lukovica in the southeast of the Upper Carniola region of Slovenia.
