= Spodnji Petelinjek =

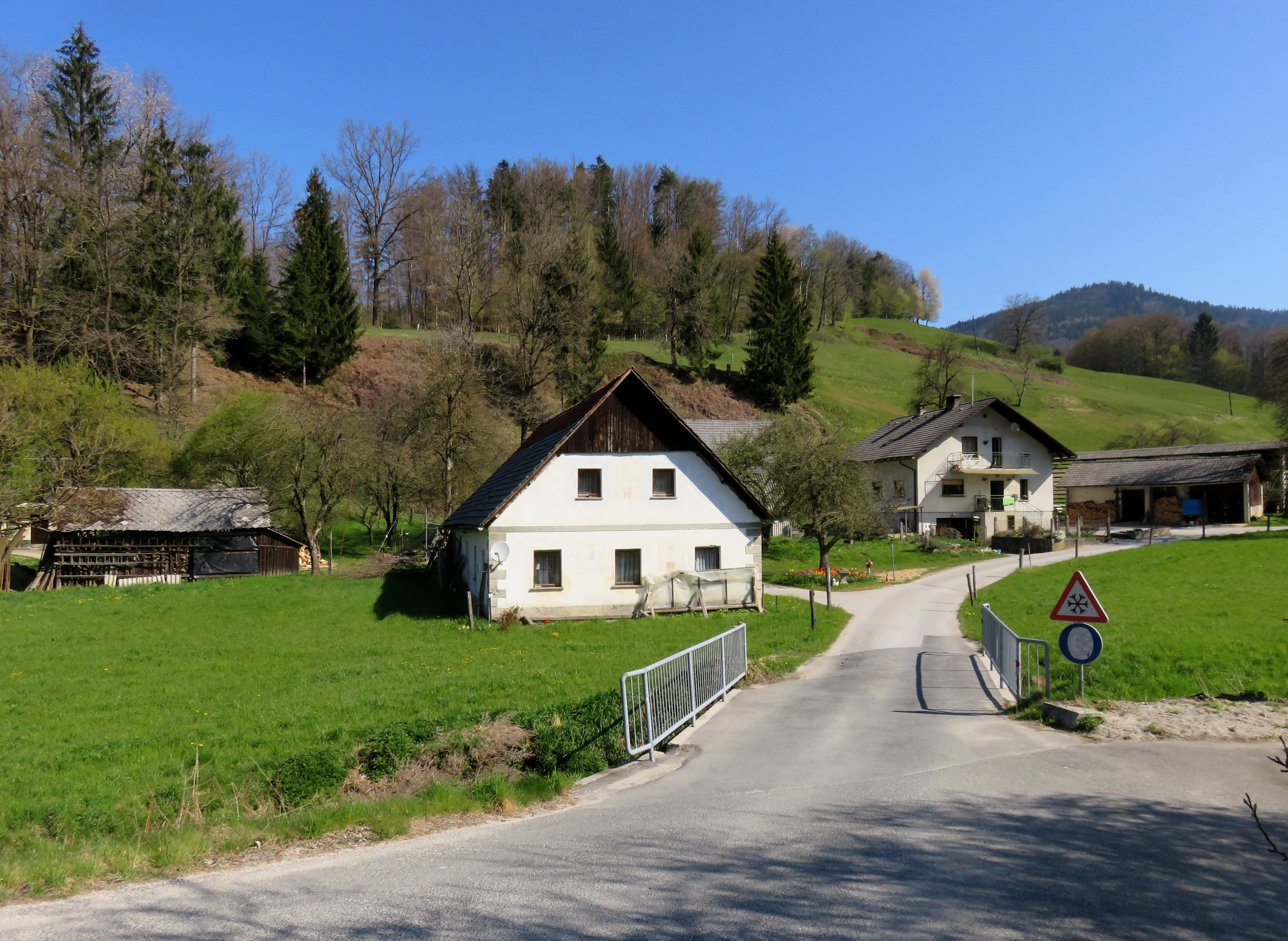

- Location in Slovenia
- Coordinates: 46°10′45.41″N 14°49′37.96″E
- Country: Slovenia
- Traditional region: Upper Carniola
- Statistical region: Central Slovenia
- Municipality: Lukovica

Area
  - Total: 0.29 km^{2} (0.11 sq mi)
- Elevation: 451 m (1,480 ft)

Population (2002)
  - Total: 26

Spodnji Petelinjek (pronounced [ˈspoːdnji pɛtɛˈliːnjɛk]; German: Unterpetelinek) is a small settlement east of Blagovica in the Municipality of Lukovica in the eastern part of the Upper Carniola region of Slovenia.
