= Koreno, Lukovica =

Koreno
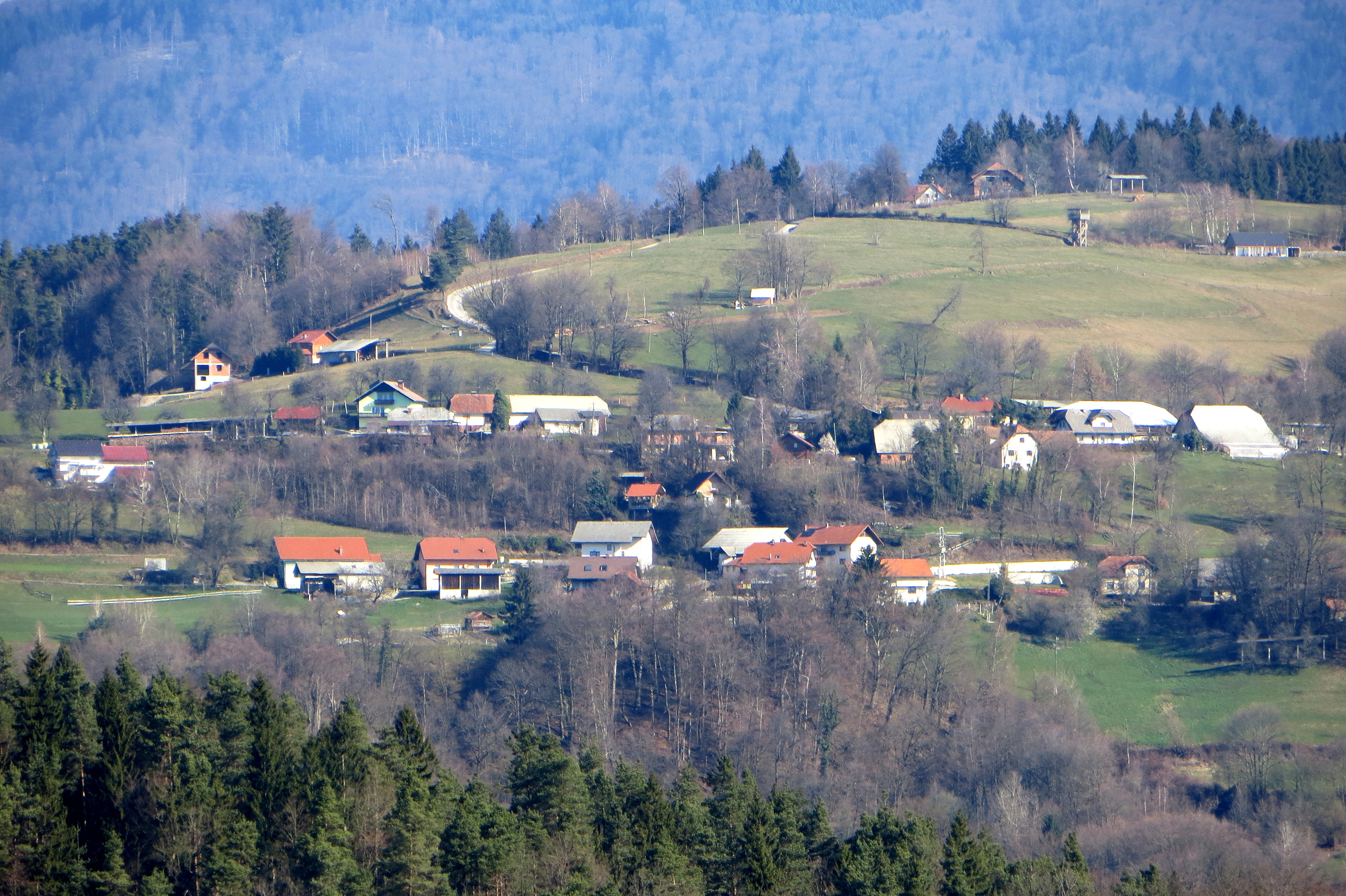

- Location in Slovenia
- Coordinates: 46°10′35.73″N 14°44′15.33″E
- Country: Slovenia
- Traditional region: Upper Carniola
- Statistical region: Central Slovenia
- Municipality: Lukovica

Area
  - Total: 1.68 km^{2} (0.65 sq mi)
- Elevation: 560.8 m (1,840 ft)

Population (2002)
  - Total: 59

Koreno (pronounced [kɔˈɾɛːnɔ]) is a settlement in the Municipality of Lukovica in the eastern Upper Carniola region of Slovenia.
