= Krajno Brdo =

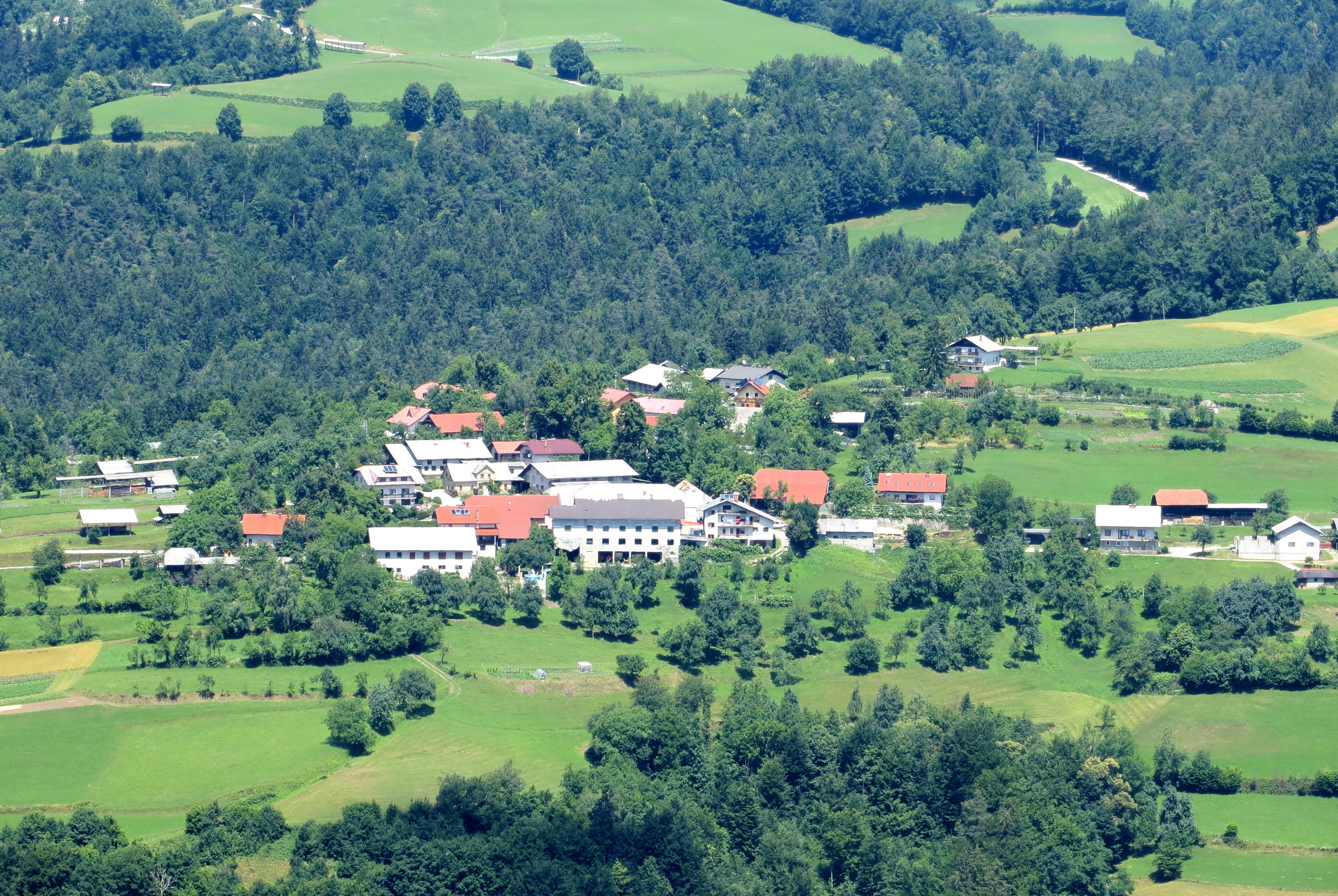

- Location in Slovenia
- Coordinates: 46°10′32.05″N 14°45′50.47″E
- Country: Slovenia
- Traditional region: Upper Carniola
- Statistical region: Central Slovenia
- Municipality: Lukovica

Area
  - Total: 1.57 km^{2} (0.61 sq mi)
- Elevation: 605.3 m (1,986 ft)

Population (2002)
  - Total: 108

Krajno Brdo (pronounced [ˈkɾaːi̯nɔ ˈbəɾdɔ]) is a settlement northeast of Krašnja in the Municipality of Lukovica in the southeastern part of the Upper Carniola region of Slovenia.
