= Učak =

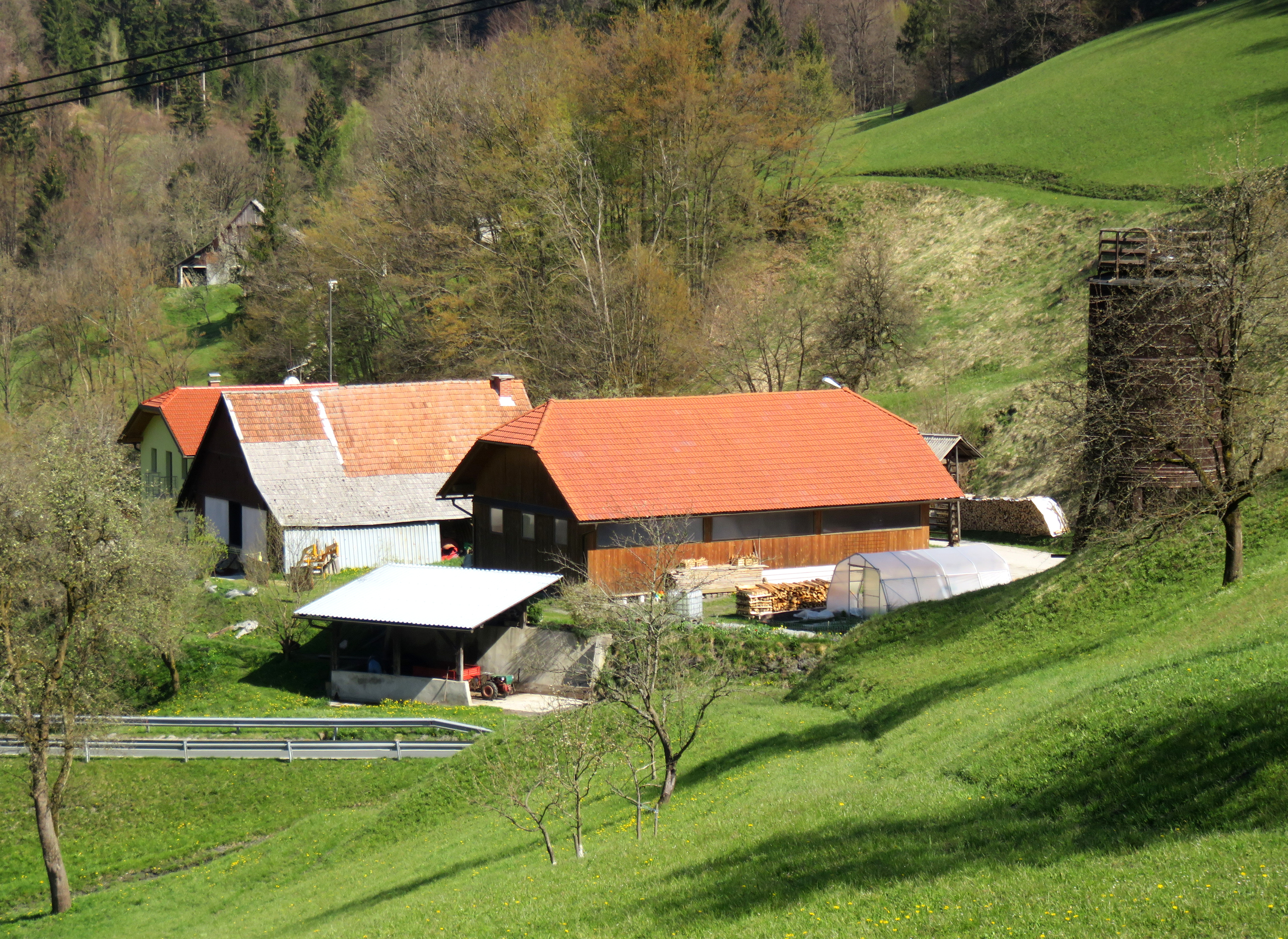

- Location in Slovenia
- Coordinates: 46°11′11.51″N 14°51′58.72″E
- Country: Slovenia
- Traditional region: Upper Carniola
- Statistical region: Central Slovenia
- Municipality: Lukovica

Area
  - Total: 1.54 km^{2} (0.59 sq mi)
- Elevation: 556.6 m (1,826 ft)

Population (2002)
  - Total: 42

Učak (pronounced [uˈtʃaːk]) is a small settlement in the Municipality of Lukovica, east of Šentožbolt and west of Trojane, in central Slovenia.
