= Mali Jelnik =

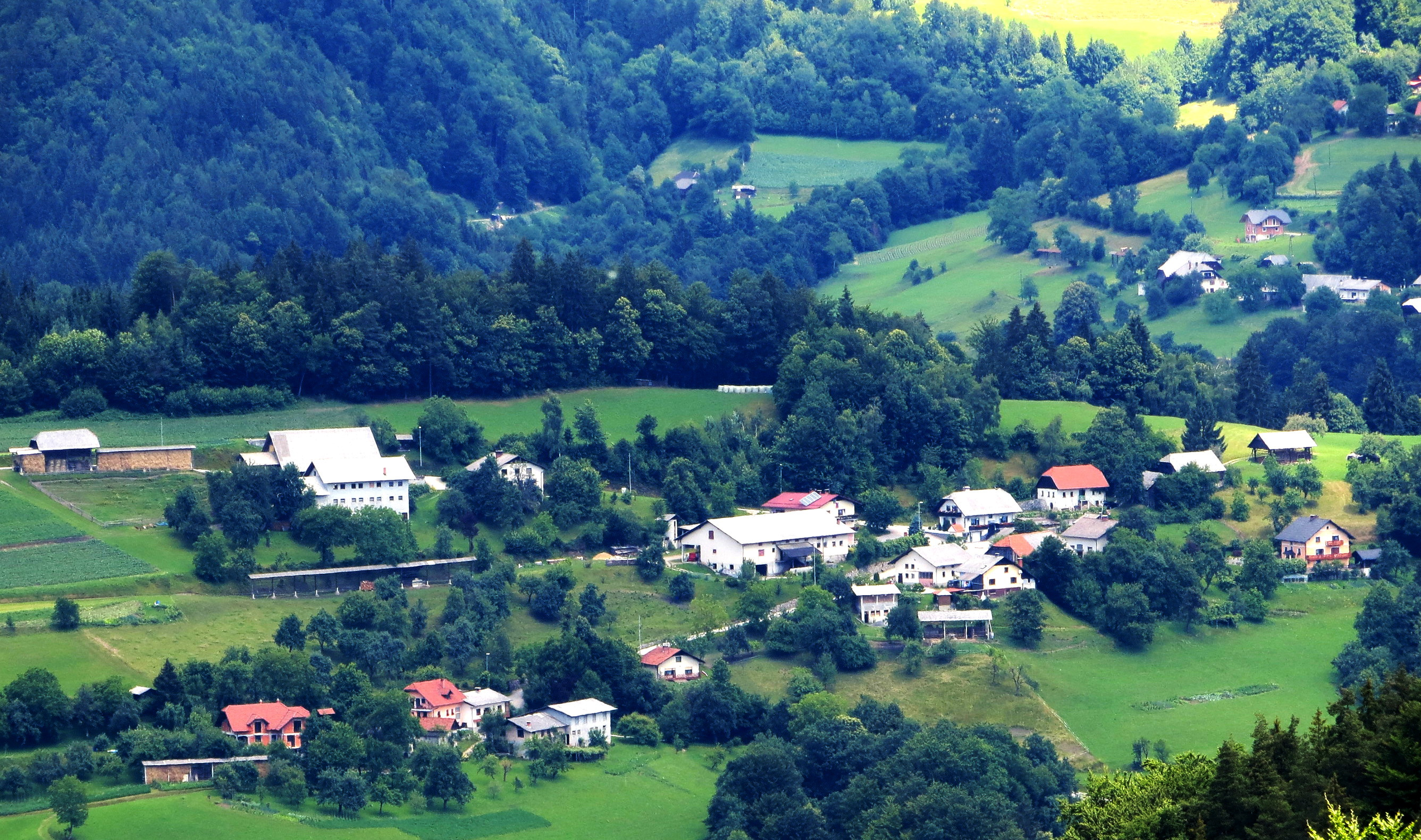

- Location in Slovenia
- Coordinates: 46°10′41.99″N 14°47′44.67″E
- Country: Slovenia
- Traditional region: Upper Carniola
- Statistical region: Central Slovenia
- Municipality: Lukovica

Area
  - Total: 0.83 km^{2} (0.32 sq mi)
- Elevation: 526 m (1,726 ft)

Population (2002)
  - Total: 48

Mali Jelnik (pronounced [ˈmaːli ˈjeːu̯nik]; German: Kleinjeunig) is a small settlement above Blagovica in the Municipality of Lukovica in the eastern part of the Upper Carniola region of Slovenia.
