= Brezovica pri Zlatem Polju =

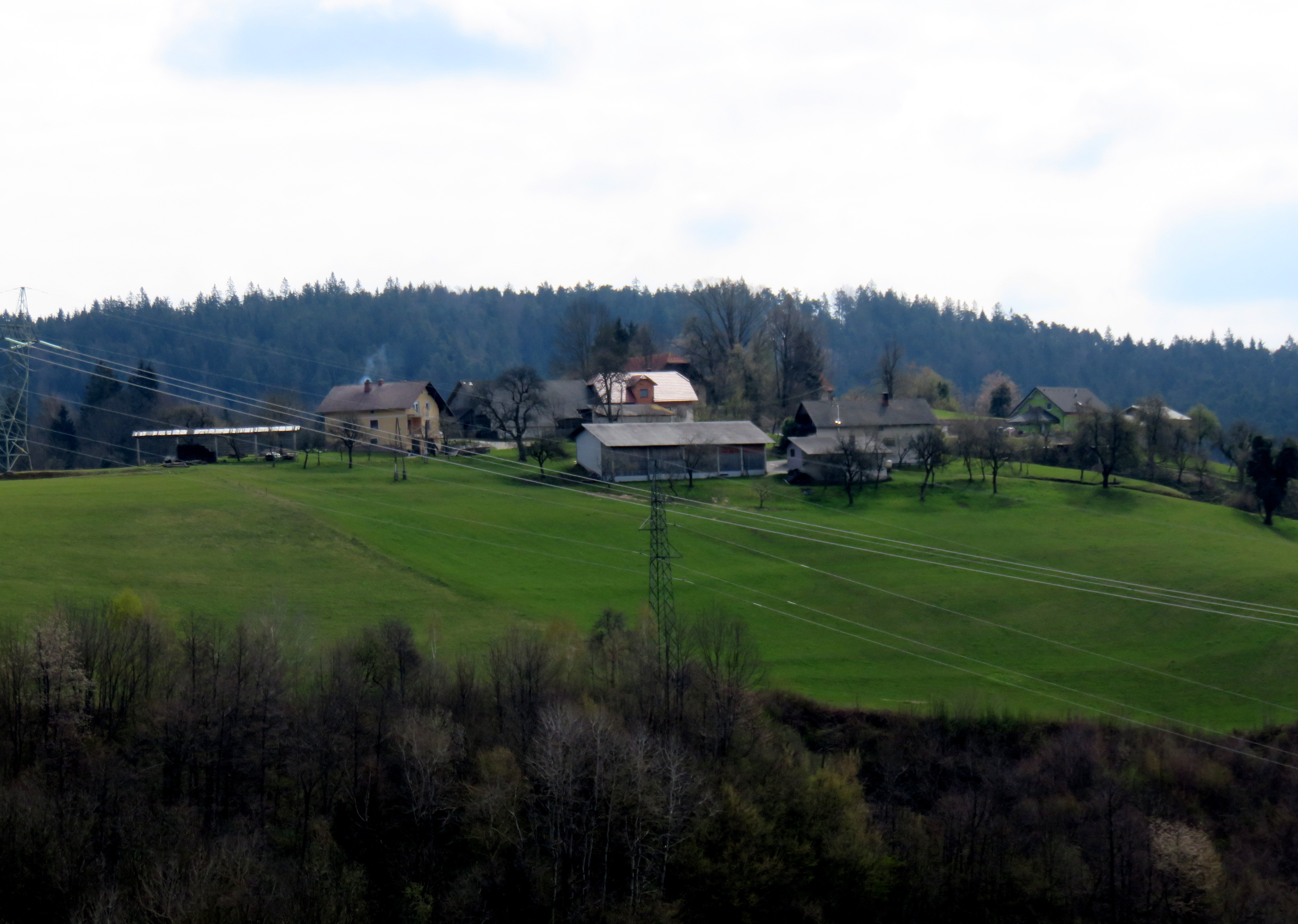

- Location in Slovenia
- Coordinates: 46°11′42.75″N 14°44′0.09″E
- Country: Slovenia
- Traditional region: Upper Carniola
- Statistical region: Central Slovenia
- Municipality: Lukovica

Area
  - Total: 2.12 km^{2} (0.82 sq mi)
- Elevation: 605.6 m (1,987 ft)

Population (2002)
  - Total: 24

Brezovica pri Zlatem Polju (pronounced [ˈbɾéːzɔʋitsa pɾi ˈzlàːtɛm ˈpóːlju]; German: Bresowitz) is a small settlement in the hills northeast of Lukovica pri Domžalah in the eastern part of the Upper Carniola region of Slovenia.

== Name ==
The name of the settlement was changed from Brezovica to Brezovica pri Zlatem Polju in 1953. In the past the German name was Bresowitz.
