= Spodnje Prapreče =

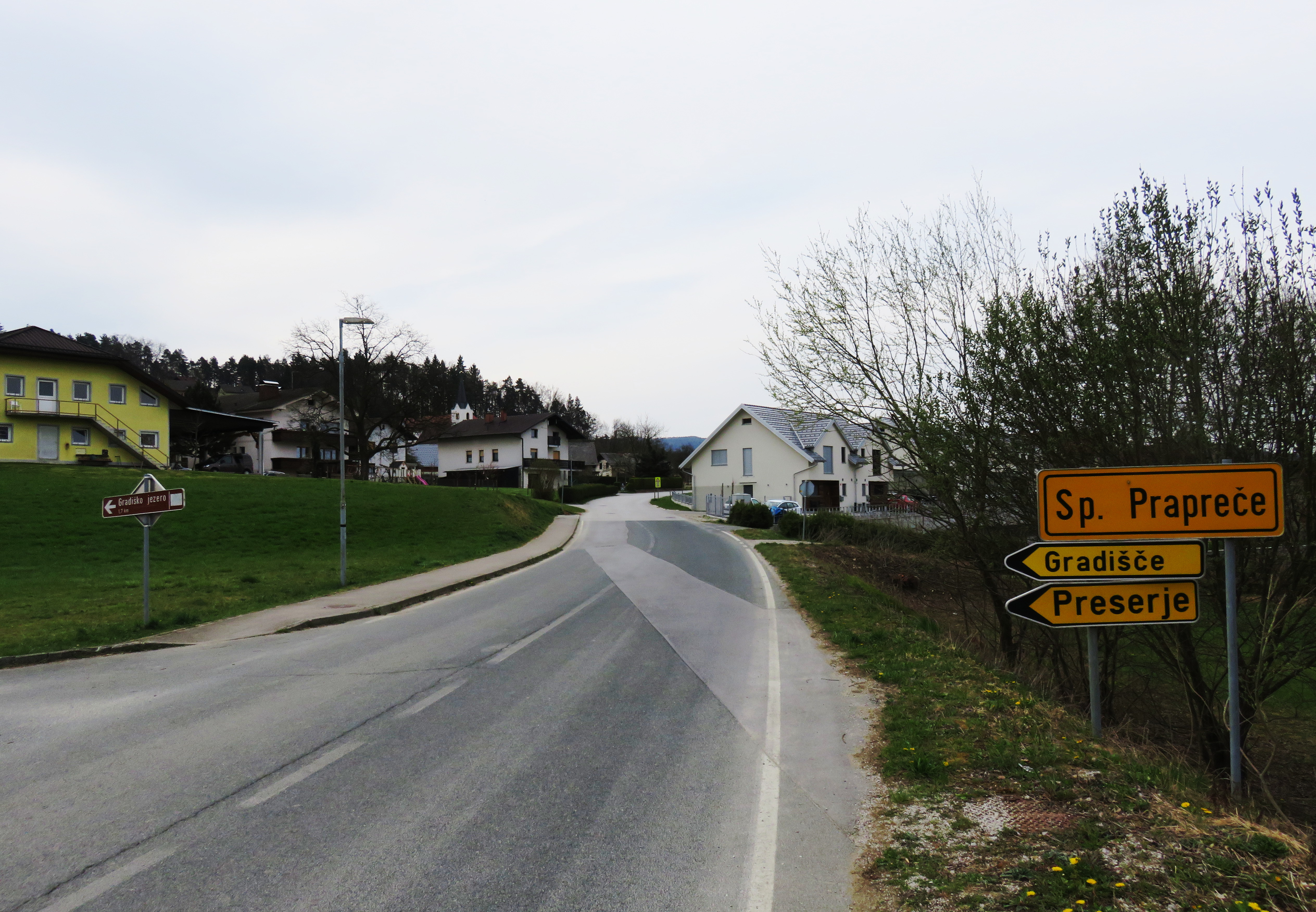

- Location in Slovenia
- Coordinates: 46°9′46.08″N 14°41′28.68″E
- Country: Slovenia
- Traditional region: Upper Carniola
- Statistical region: Central Slovenia
- Municipality: Lukovica

Area
  - Total: 1.08 km^{2} (0.42 sq mi)
- Elevation: 333.5 m (1,094 ft)

Population (2002)
  - Total: 146

Spodnje Prapreče (pronounced [ˈspoːdnjɛ ˈpɾaːpɾɛtʃɛ]; German: Unterprapretsch) is a village near Lukovica pri Domžalah in the eastern part of the Upper Carniola region of Slovenia.

== Church ==
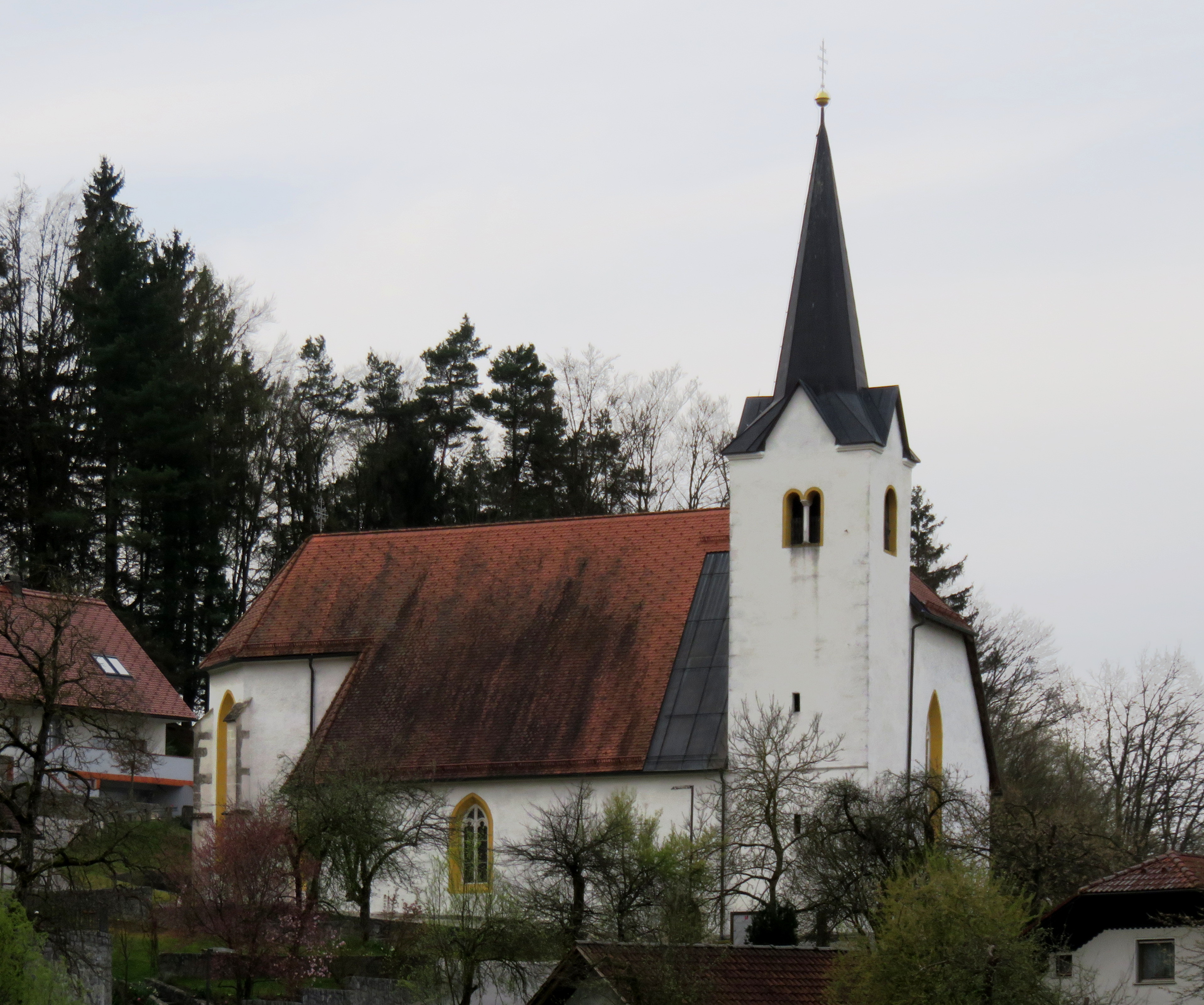
Saint Luke's Church

The local church is dedicated to Saint Luke and dates to the early 16th century.
