= Gabrje pod Špilkom =

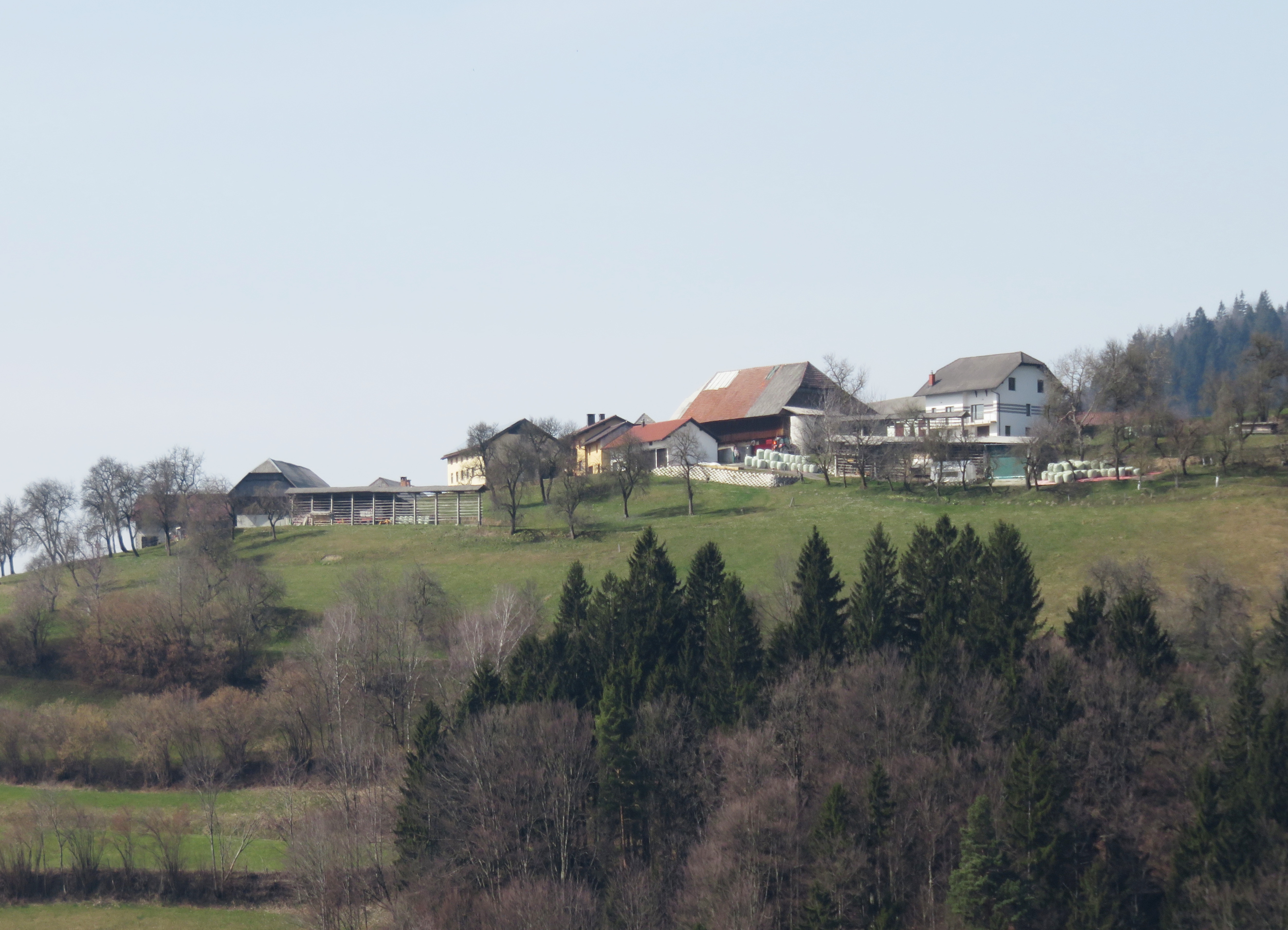

- Location in Slovenia
- Coordinates: 46°11′37.48″N 14°48′49.76″E
- Country: Slovenia
- Traditional region: Upper Carniola
- Statistical region: Central Slovenia
- Municipality: Lukovica

Area
  - Total: 1.49 km^{2} (0.58 sq mi)
- Elevation: 765.2 m (2,510 ft)

Population (2002)
  - Total: 37

Gabrje pod Špilkom (pronounced [ˈɡaːbəɾjɛ pɔt ˈʃpiːlkɔm]) is a small settlement in the hills north of Blagovica in the Municipality of Lukovica in the eastern part of the Upper Carniola region of Slovenia.

== Name ==
The name of the settlement was changed from Gabrje to Gabrje pod Špilkom in 1953.
