= Zlatenek =

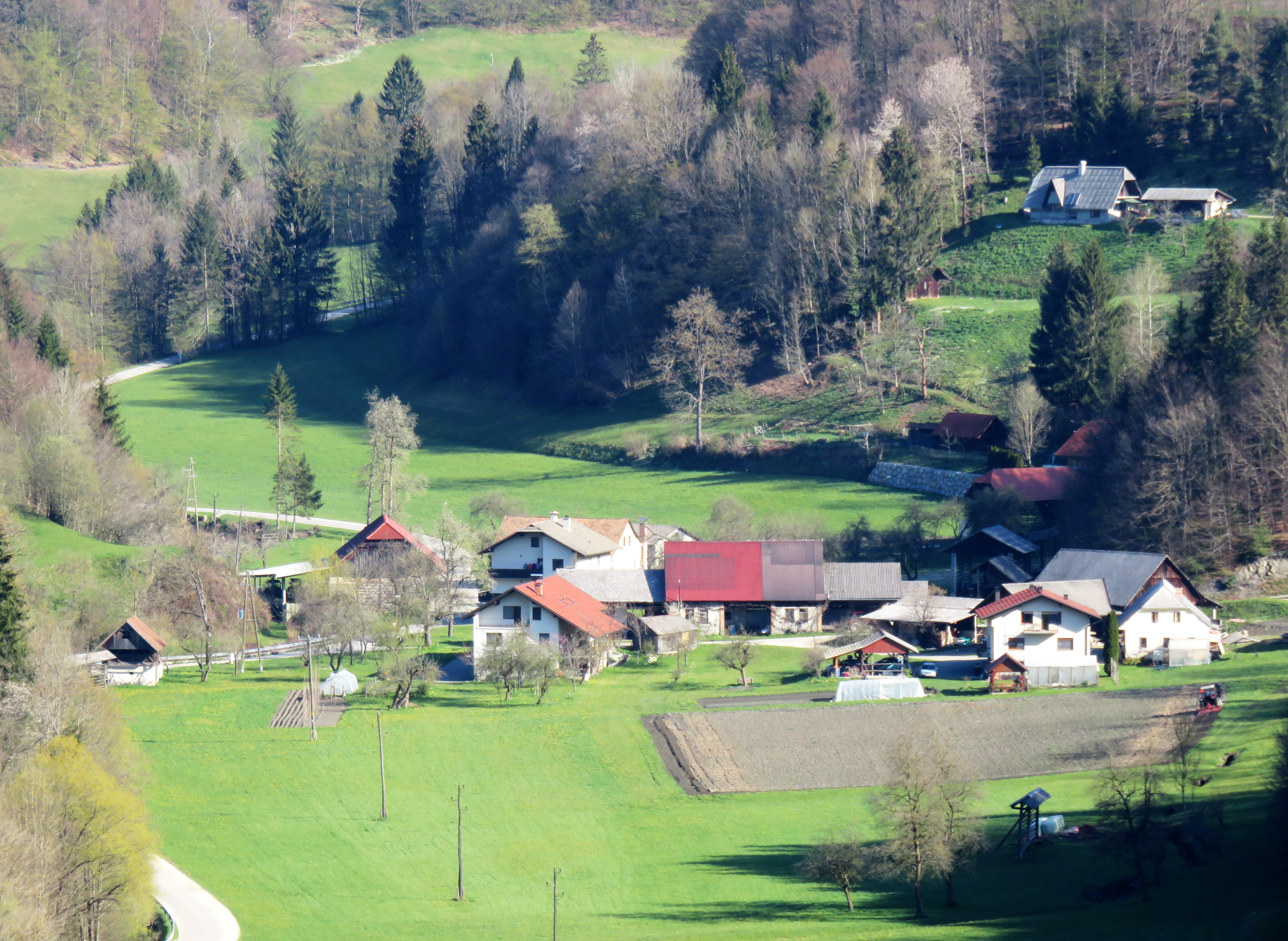

- Location in Slovenia
- Coordinates: 46°10′57.25″N 14°48′8.86″E
- Country: Slovenia
- Traditional region: Upper Carniola
- Statistical region: Central Slovenia
- Municipality: Lukovica

Area
  - Total: 0.6 km^{2} (0.23 sq mi)
- Elevation: 427.5 m (1,403 ft)

Population (2002)
  - Total: 40

Zlatenek (pronounced [zlaˈteːnək]; in older sources also Slatenek, German: Slatenk) is a dispersed settlement above Blagovica in the Municipality of Lukovica in the eastern part of the Upper Carniola region of Slovenia.

== Name ==
Zlatenek was attested in written sources as Oberslatenikch in 1378, Slatenik in 1379, Slätenig in 1414, and Slattonig in 1451.
