= Zavrh pri Trojanah =

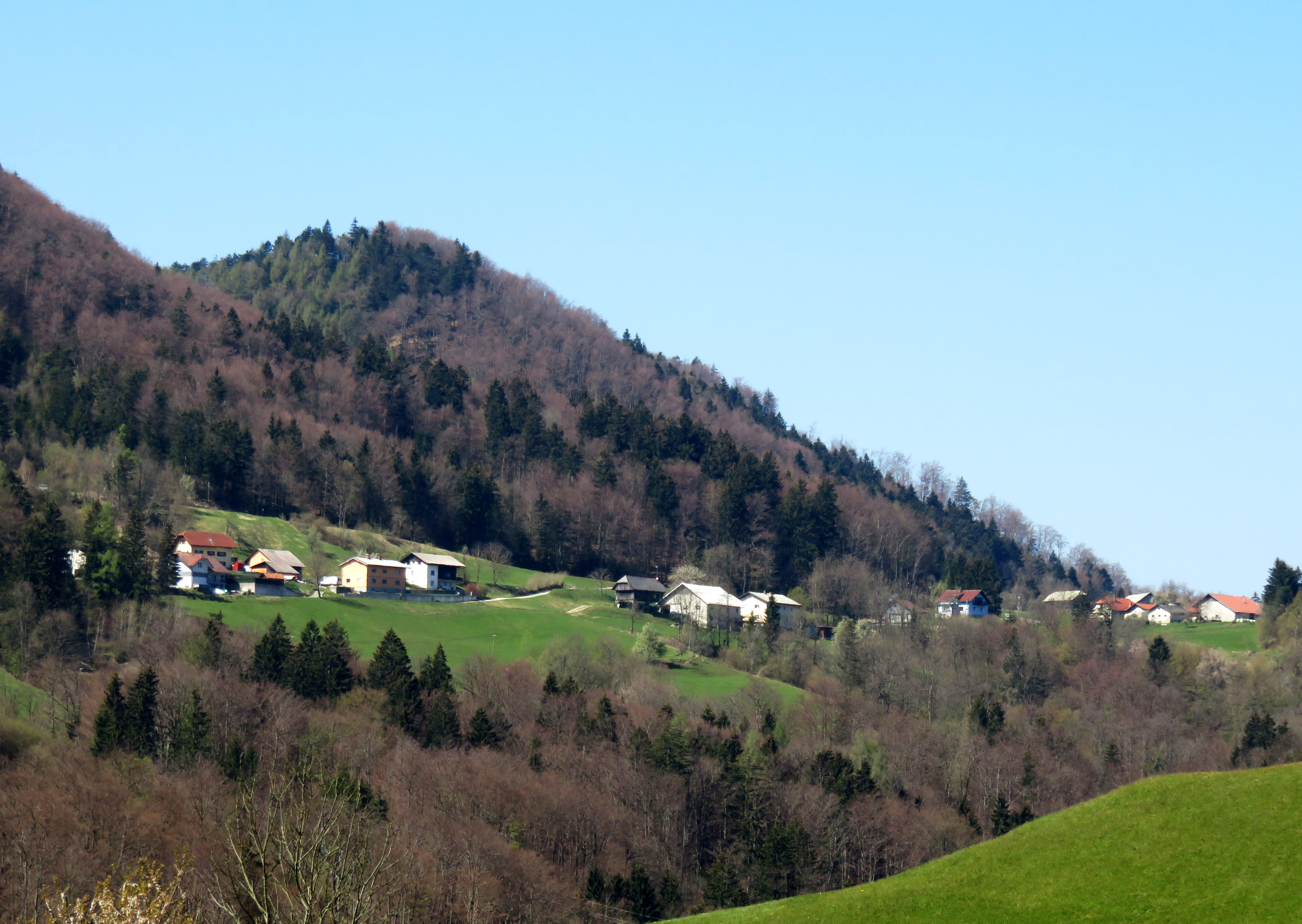

- Location in Slovenia
- Coordinates: 46°10′44.72″N 14°52′58.05″E
- Country: Slovenia
- Traditional region: Upper Carniola
- Statistical region: Central Slovenia
- Municipality: Lukovica

Area
  - Total: 1.51 km^{2} (0.58 sq mi)
- Elevation: 628.9 m (2,063 ft)

Population (2002)
  - Total: 51

Zavrh pri Trojanah (pronounced [zaˈʋəɾx pɾi tɾɔˈjaːnax]; in older sources also Za Vrhom, German: Sawerch) is a small dispersed settlement above Trojane in the Municipality of Lukovica in the eastern part of the Upper Carniola region of Slovenia.

== Name ==
The name of the settlement was changed from Zavrh to Zavrh pri Trojanah in 1953. In the past the German name was Sawerch.
