= Zgornji Petelinjek =

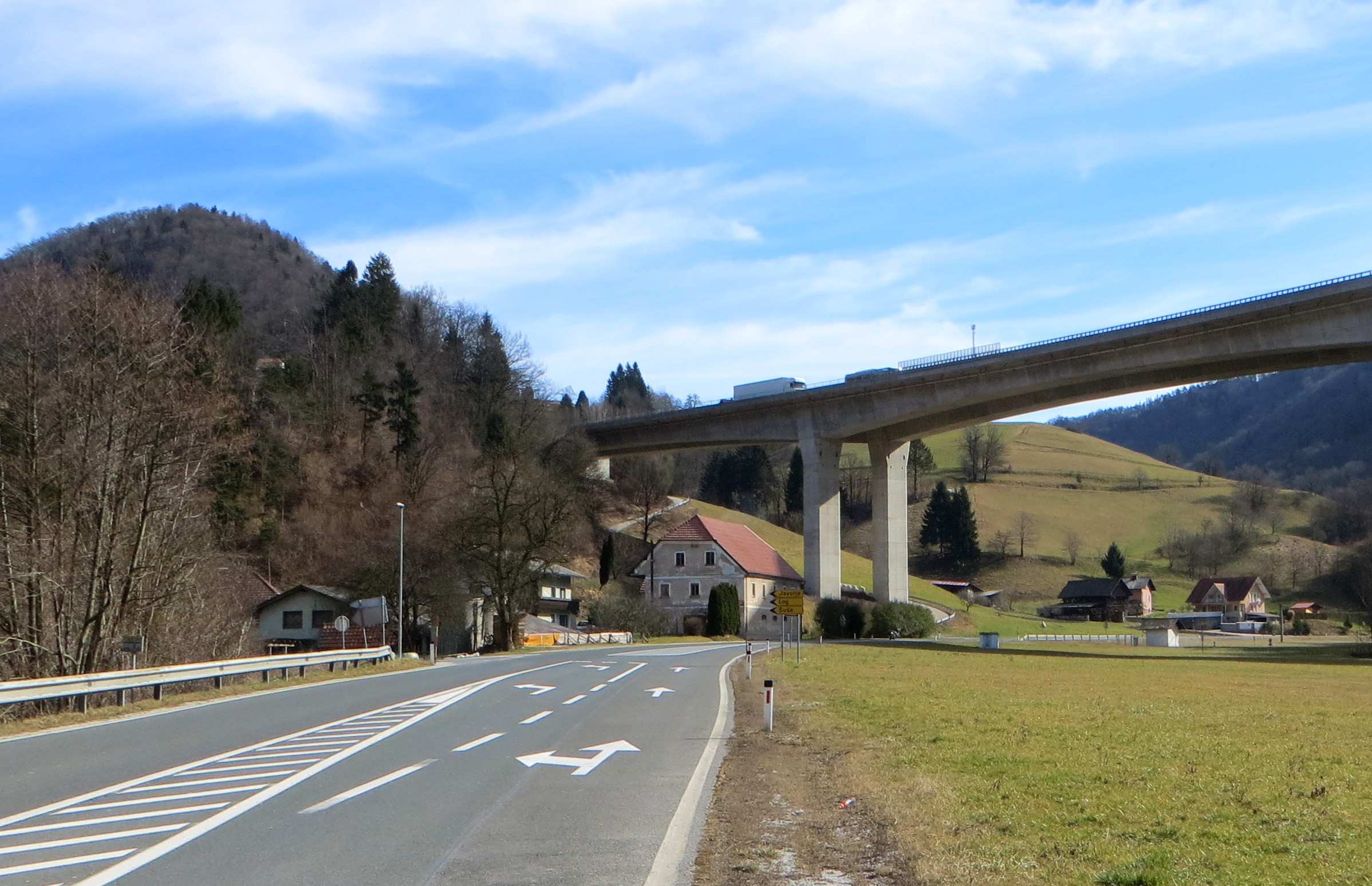

- Location in Slovenia
- Coordinates: 46°10′34.73″N 14°49′40.33″E
- Country: Slovenia
- Traditional region: Upper Carniola
- Statistical region: Central Slovenia
- Municipality: Lukovica

Area
  - Total: 0.15 km^{2} (0.058 sq mi)
- Elevation: 448.5 m (1,471 ft)

Population (2002)
  - Total: 18

Zgornji Petelinjek (pronounced [ˈzɡoːɾnji pɛtɛˈliːnjɛk]; in older sources also Gornji Petelinjek, German: Oberpetelinek) is a small settlement in the Municipality of Lukovica in the eastern part of the Upper Carniola region of Slovenia. It lies on the main road from Ljubljana to Celje.
