= Prvine =

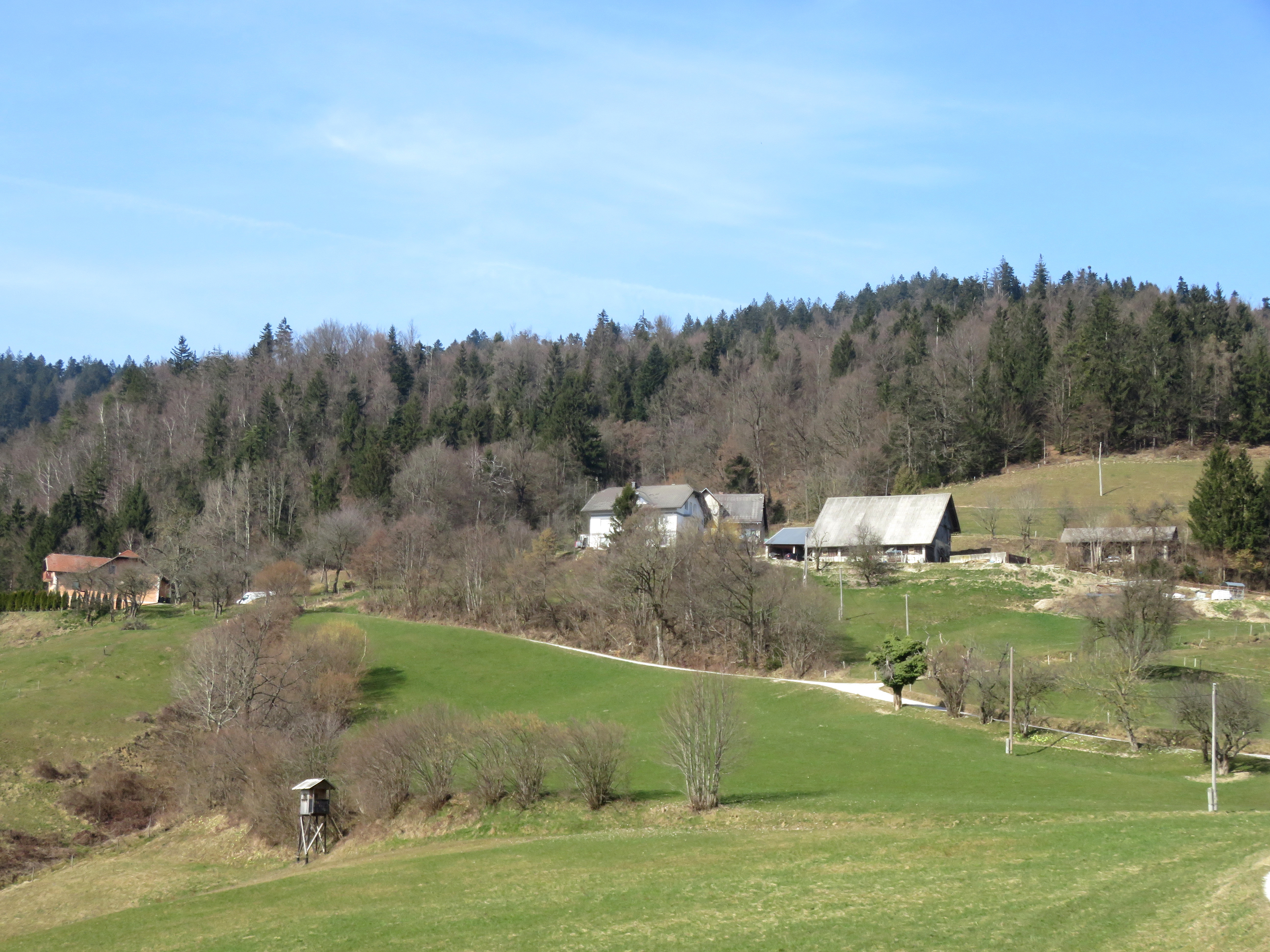

- Location in Slovenia
- Coordinates: 46°11′24.39″N 14°50′56.2″E
- Country: Slovenia
- Traditional region: Upper Carniola
- Statistical region: Central Slovenia
- Municipality: Lukovica

Area
  - Total: 0.75 km^{2} (0.29 sq mi)
- Elevation: 697.1 m (2,287 ft)

Population (2002)
  - Total: 13

Prvine (pronounced [pəɾˈʋiːnɛ]) is a small settlement in the hills above Šentožbolt in the Municipality of Lukovica in the eastern part of the Upper Carniola region of Slovenia.
