= A1 motorway (Slovenia) =

Motorway in Slovenia

A1 Motorway
- Avtocesta A1

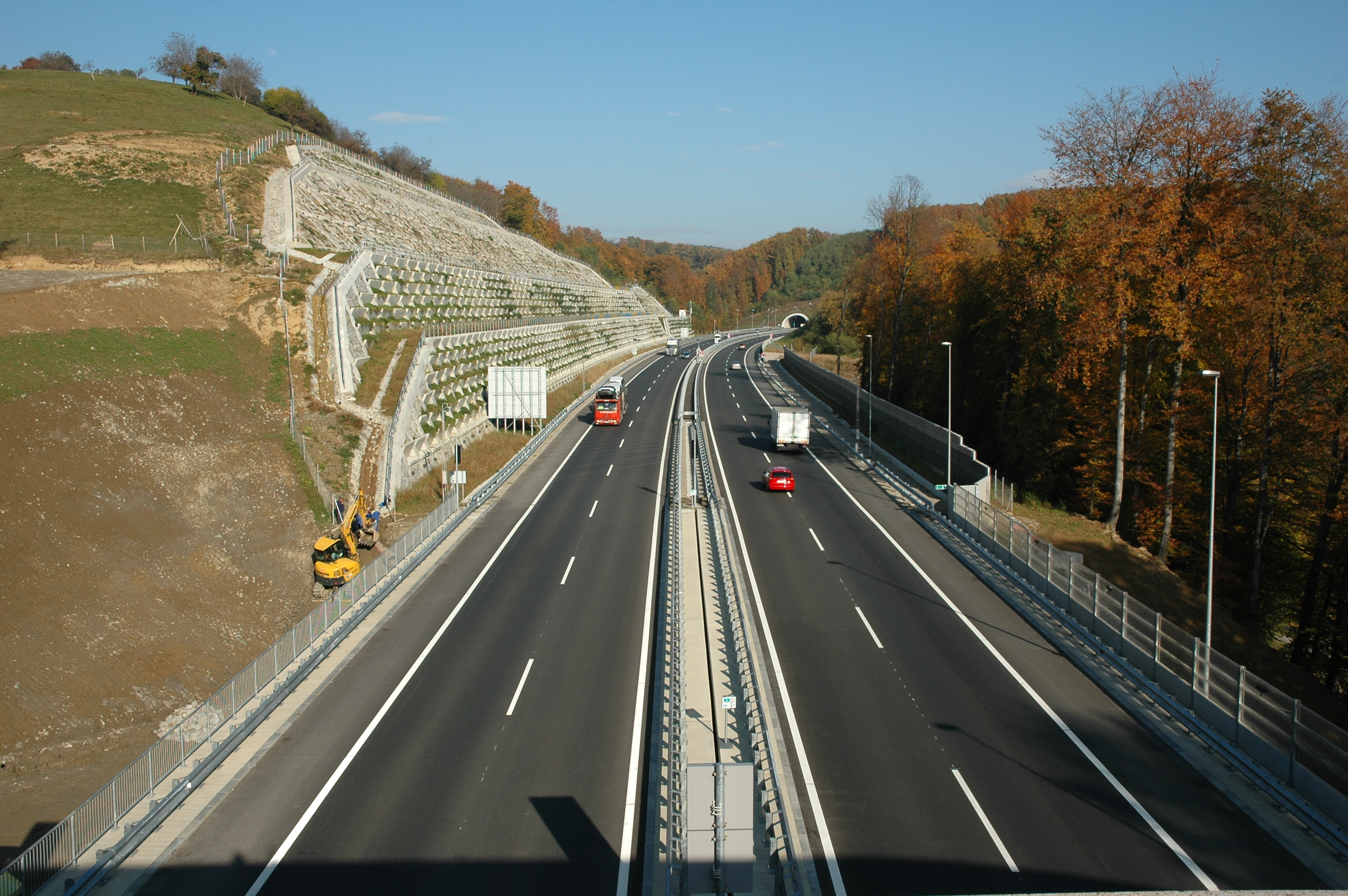
- A1 motorway at Vodole

Route information
- Part of E57 / E59 / E61 / E70
- Length: 245.3 km (152.4 mi)

Major junctions
- From: A 9 in Austria
- H2 near Pesnica; A5 near Dragučova; H2 near Spodnje Hoče; A4 near Spodnje Hoče; H3 near Ljubljana; A2 near Ljubljana; H4 near Razdrto; A3 near Gabrk

- To: H5 near Ankaran

Location
- Country: Slovenia
- Major cities: Maribor, Celje, Ljubljana, Postojna, Koper

Highway system
- Highways in Slovenia

The A1 motorway (Slovene: avtocesta A1), also known as Slovenika or Styrian and Littoral motorway (Slovene: Štajerska in Primorska avtocesta), is 245.3 km (152.4 mi) long, connecting Šentilj (at the Austrian border) and Koper/Capodistria (on the shores of the Adriatic Sea). It connects several of the largest metropolitan areas of the country, including Maribor, Celje and Ljubljana, all the way to the Slovenian Littoral and port town of Koper.

Construction began in 1970 and the first section was finished in 1972, connecting Vrhnika and Postojna. Everyday operation of this initial stretch started on 29 December 1972.

The connection to Koper was finished on 23 November 2004. The second-to-last part, from Trojane to Blagovica, was opened on 12 August 2005. It was also the most expensive, having eight viaducts and two tunnels despite being only 11 km long. The final section, the eastern Maribor bypass, opened on 14 August 2009.

== Route description ==
The A1 motorway provides connection of Slovenia and Austria (only other motorway with border crossing to Austria being A2 motorway) and was from the very start an important route, because it connected the three largest cities in Slovenia – Ljubljana, Maribor and Celje. On the other hand, it also connected all those cities with Slovenian coast and provided better conditions for transit to Port of Koper. As of 2013 it is also the only motorway that is connected to all the other motorways in Slovenia.

As of 2013 motorway always has at least two traffic lanes in each direction and is rarely without emergency lane. On some parts it has three traffic lanes in one direction and two in another (usually the additional is for slow vehicles). Only Tunnel Golovec has three lanes in each direction. It was also planned that some other parts of highway will get additional lanes but most of plans were postponed due to lack of money.

== Toll ==
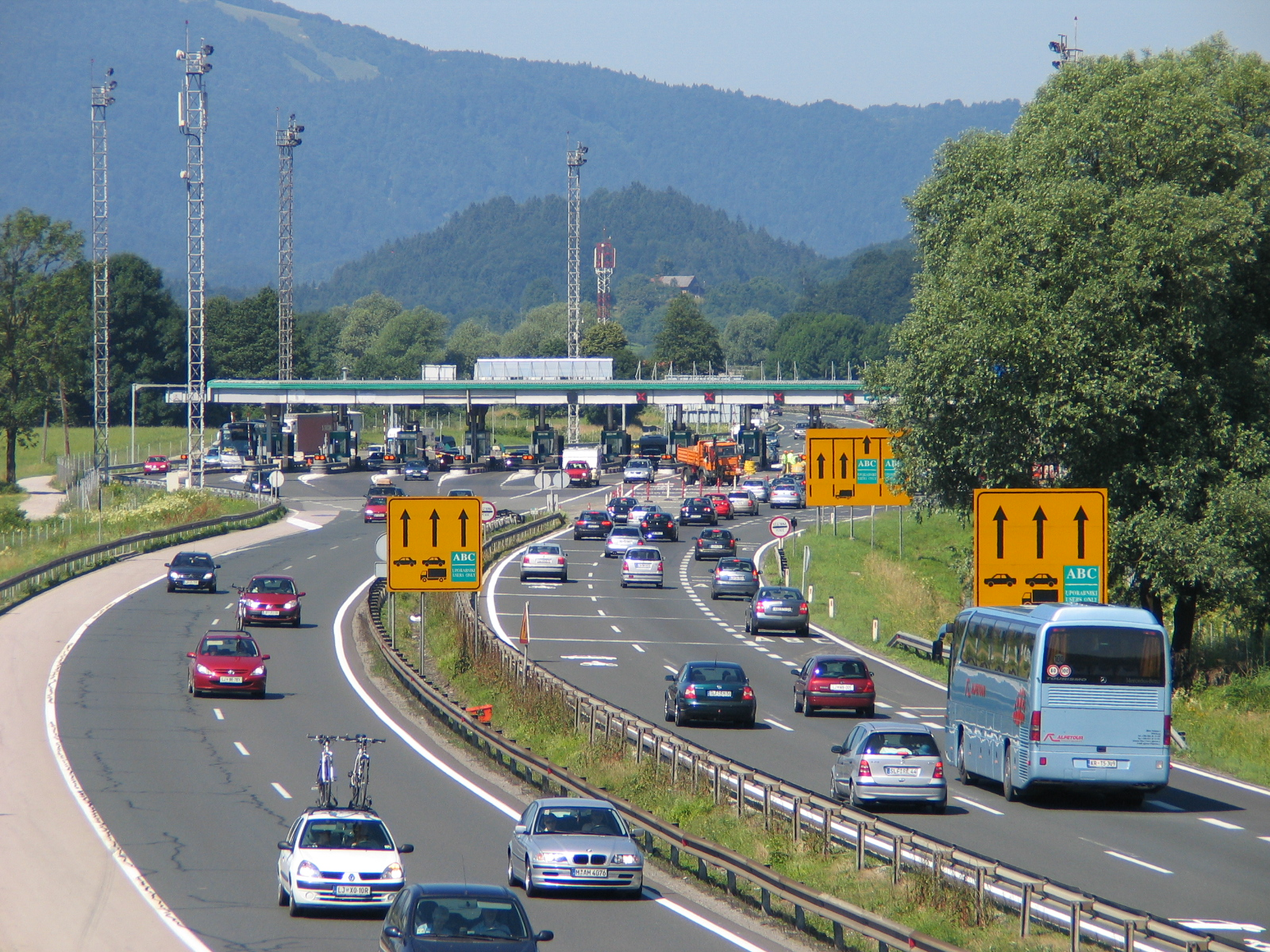
The toll station at Log pri Brezovici

Until 1 July 2008 all vehicles had to stop at tollgates and pay a toll. Since that date vignettes are required for all vehicles up to 3.5 tons, while heavier vehicles must still pay the toll at a tollgate. Tollgates are being rearranged so that two traffic lanes for lighter vehicles (with vignettes) are no longer divided by tollgates and vehicles can drive through at 60 kilometres per hour (37 miles per hour). Where tollgates are still standing as they were before 1 July 2008, the speed limit is 40 kilometres per hour (25 miles per hour). Since 2018, heavy vehicles need to pay toll with an electronic on-board unit attached on the windscreen and tollgates are not needed anymore.

There are six toll stations for heavier vehicles Pesnica, Tepanje, Vransko, Kompolje, Log and Videž. For R3 group it ranges from €3.40 to €19.60, together €47.10 at daytime (6 AM-10 PM) and from €3.00 to €17.60, together €42.30 at night (10 PM-6 AM). For R4 group it ranges from €4.90 to €28.30, together €68.20 at daytime (6 AM-10 PM) and from €4.40 to €25.50, together €61.40 at night (10 PM-6 AM).

== Notable structures ==
When most parts of motorway were already done, there came two parts that were something special, meaning tunnels near Trojane with most notable being Tunnel Trojane with length of almost 3 kilometres and thus second longest tunnel in Slovenia (the longest being Karawanks Tunnel) and viaduct Črni Kal, the longest viaduct in Slovenia, being longer than 1 kilometer and also 95 metres high.

== Junction list ==
Šentilj - Srmin (245.3 km)
Pyhrn Autobahn → from Graz, Austria
Border control	0,0 km	Šentilj (SLO) - Spielfeld (AT) border crossing	
Petrol station Rest area	0,5 km	Počivališče Šentilj	Petrol / Petrol
Viaduct	1,3 km	Šentilj Viaduct	Bridge - 185 m
(1)	1,6 km	Šentilj	
Viaduct	3,7 km	Kresnica Viaduct	Bridge - 587 m
Petrol station Rest area	9,6 km	Počivališče Dobrenje	MOL / MOL
(2)	10,7 km	Maribor north	
Viaduct	11,2 km	Pekel Viaduct	Bridge - 448 m
(3)	12,5 km	Dragučova Interchange	A5 turns toward → Murska Sobota and Letenye (Hungary) (European Union)
Viaduct	12,7 km	Dragučova Viaduct	Bridge - 448 m
Viaduct	13,9 km	Vodole V Viaduct	Bridge - 321 m/180 m
Viaduct	14,4 km	Vodole IV Viaduct	Bridge - 162 m
Viaduct	14,8 km	Vodole III Viaduct	Bridge - 205 m
Galeria	15,2 km	Vodole Tunnel	Tunnel - 225 m/249 m
Viaduct	15,5	Vodole II Viaduct	Bridge - 139 m
Viaduct	16,0	Vodole I Viaduct	Bridge - 48 m
Galeria	16,1 km	Malečnik Covered cut	Tunnel - 185 m
	16,6 km	Drava	Bridge - 765 m
(4)	17,5 km	Maribor east	
Petrol station Rest area	18,9 km	Počivališče Maribor	Petrol / Petrol
(5)	21,3 km	Maribor centre	
(6)	23,5 km	Rogoza	
Viaduct	24,9 km	Rogoza Viaduct	Bridge - 202 m
(7)	25,8 km	Slivnica Interchange (Maribor south)	A4 turns toward → Ptuj and Zagreb (Croatia) (European Union)
(8)	29,4 km	Fram	
Rest area	32,6 km	Počivališče Polskava	
Viaduct	36,7 km	Devina Viaduct	Bridge - 80 m
(9)	37,1 km	Slovenska Bistrica north	
(10)	39,2 km	Slovenska Bistrica south	
Viaduct	44,7 km	Vrhole Viaduct	Bridge - 238 m
Viaduct	45,6 km	Preloge Viaduct	Bridge - 539 m
Petrol station Rest area	47,8 km	Počivališče Tepanje	Petrol / Petrol
(11)	48,9 km	Slovenske Konjice	
	50,5 km	Dravinja	Bridge - 21 m
Tunnel	52,0 km	Golo Rebro Tunnel	Tunnel - 788 / 757 m
Viaduct	52,9 km	Škedenj I Viaduct	Bridge - 466 m / 542 m
Viaduct	53,3 km	Grapa Viaduct	Bridge - 63 m
Viaduct	53,6 km	Škedenj II Viaduct	Bridge - 401 m / 398 m
Tunnel	54,6 km	Pletovarje Tunnel	Tunnel - 708 m / 745 m
Viaduct	56,4 km	Slatina Viaduct	Bridge - 439 km
(12)	60,0 km	Dramlje	
Viaduct	60,6 km	Dramlje Viaduct	Bridge - 141 m
Rest area	62,4 km	Počivališče Zima	
Viaduct	63,3 km	Žepina Viaduct	Bridge - 142 m
(13)	66,4 km	Celje east	
(14)	69,9 km	Celje centre	
Petrol station Rest area	73,5 km	Počivališče Lopata	Petrol / MOL
(15)	73,5 km	Celje west	
(16)	76,2 km	Žalec	
(17)	83,7 km	Šempeter	
	85,1 km	Savinja	Bridge - 150 m
(18)	86,0 km	Šentrupert	
Interchange	86,0 km	Šentrupert Interchange (planned)	H8 will turn toward → Dravograd
(19)	94,0 km	Vransko	
Covered Cut	97,9 km	Ločica Tunnel	Tunnel - 750 m / 810 m
Viaduct	99,0 km	Ločica Viaduct	Bridge - 825 m / 873 m
Viaduct	100,0 km	Jasovnik Viaduct	Bridge - 120 m / 34 m
Covered Cut	100,8 km	Jasovnik Tunnel	Tunnel - 1633 m / 1612 m
Viaduct	102,4 km	Baba Viaduct	Bridge - 150 m / 170 m
Viaduct	102,7 km	Zlokarje Viaduct	Bridge - 191 m / 208 m
(20)	103,4 km	Trojane	
Viaduct	103,5 km	Jelševica Viaduct	Bridge - 254 m / 144 m
Viaduct	103,8 km	Črni Mlinar Viaduct	Bridge - 261 m / 212 m
Covered Cut	104,7 km	Trojane Tunnel	Tunnel - 2840 m / 2931 m
Viaduct	107,7 km	Šentožbolt Viaduct	Bridge - 410 m / 540 m
Covered Cut	108,4 km	Podmilj Tunnel	Tunnel - 622 m / 613 m
Viaduct	109,7 km	Log Viaduct	Bridge - 160 m / 137 m
Viaduct	110,1 km	Javorje Viaduct	Bridge - 252 m / 227 m
Viaduct	110,4 km	Petelinjek Viaduct	Bridge - 622 m / 634 m
Viaduct	111,1 km	Suša Viaduct	Bridge - 80 m
Viaduct	111,3 km	Vranke Viaduct	Bridge - 90 m / 91 m
Viaduct	112,3 km	Blagovica Viaduct	Bridge - 446 m / 449 m
(21)	112,8 km	Blagovica	
Petrol station Rest area	121,1 km	Počivališče Lukovica	MOL / Petrol
(22)	121,1 km	Lukovica	
(23)	125,0 km	Krtina	
Viaduct	128,3 km	Mlake Viaduct	Bridge - 321 m / 330 m
(24)	128,6 km	Domžale	
	129,9 km	Kamnik Bistrica	Bridge - 100 m
(24a)	x,x km	Domžale Študa (planned)	
(25)	134,3 km	Ljubljana Šentjakob	
	135,3 km	Sava	Bridge - 130 m
(26)	135,7 km	Ljubljana Sneberje	
(27)	136,8 km	Zadobrova Interchange	Ljubljana Ring road
(28)	138,1 km	Industrijska cona Moste	
(29)	138,4 km	Ljubljana east	
	139,4 km	Ljubljanica	Bridge - 82 m
(30)	139,7 km	Ljubljana Bizovik	
Tunnel	141,6 km	Strmec Covered cut	Tunnel - 200 m
Viaduct	142,3 km	Bizovik Viaduct	Bridge - 146 m / 175 m
Tunnel	142,7 km	Golovec Tunnel	Tunnel - 622 m / 595 m
(31)	143,3 km	Malence Interchange	A2 turns toward → Novo Mesto and Zagreb (Croatia) (European Union) Ljubljana Ring road
Viaduct	143,5 km	Malence D Viaduct	Bridge - 240 m
(32)	144,3 km	Ljubljana south	
Viaduct	144,7 km	Rudnik Viaduct	Bridge - 152 m / 151 m
(33)	146,1 km	Ljubljana Rudnik	
	147,7 km	Ljubljanica	Bridge - 140 m
(34)	148,5	Ljubljana centre	
Petrol station Rest area	149,7 km	Počivališče Barje	Petrol / Petrol
(34a)	149,7 km	Ljubljana Barje (planned)	
(35)	151,2 km	Ljubljana west	
Viaduct	151,7 km	Dolgi Most Viaduct	Bridge - 344 m / 319 m
(36)	152,2 km	Kozarje Interchange	A2 turn toward → Kranj and Villach (Austria) (European Union) Ljubljana Ring road
(37)	154,4 km	Brezovica	
(37a)	157,0 km	Dragomer	
	166,7 km	Ljubljanica	Bridge - 80 m
(38)	166,8 km	Vrhnika	
Viaduct	168,1 km	Verd Viaduct	Bridge - 619 m / 586 m
(39)	175,1 km	Logatec	
Petrol station Rest area	176,3 km	Počivališče Lom	Petrol / Petrol
Viaduct	177,2 km	Derviše Viaduct	Bridge - 69 m
Viaduct	184,1 km	Ivanje Selo Viaduct	Bridge - 225 m
(40)	185,4 km	Unec	
Viaduct	186,2 km	Unec Viaduct	Bridge - 200 m
Viaduct	191,9 km	Ravbarkomanda Viaduct	Bridge - 588 m / 553 m
Petrol station Rest area	192,8 km	Počivališče Ravbarkomanda	MOL / MOL
(41)	196,6 km	Postojna	
	198,1 km	Pivka (river)	Bridge - 40 m
Rest area	200,0 km	Počivališče Studenec	
(42)	206,3 km	Razdrto	
(43)	207,6 km	Nanos Interchange	H4 turns toward → Gorizia (Italy) (European Union)
Viaduct	209,1 km	Goli vrh Viaduct	Bridge - 166 m / 120 m
Viaduct	211,4 km	Bandera Viaduct	Bridge - 278 m / 252 m
(44)	213,4 km	Senožeče	
(45)	217,5 km	Gabrk Interchange	A3, turn toward → Trieste (Italy) (European Union)
Viaduct	218,0 km	Gabrk Viaduct	Bridge - 90 m
Viaduct	219,2 km	Divača Viaduct	Bridge - 32 m
Rest area	220,3 km	Počivališče Risnik	
(46)	220,8 km	Divača	
(47)	227,5 km	Kozina	runs along
Petrol station Rest area	228,8 km	Počivališče Ravne	Petrol
Viaduct	229,5 km	Klanec Viaduct	Bridge - 75 m
Viaduct	231,2 km	Glinščica Viaduct	Bridge - 230 m
Viaduct	233,0 km	Smelavc Viaduct	Bridge - 210 m
Tunnel	234,0 km	Kastelec Tunnel	Tunnel - 2195 m / 2303 m
(48)	236,0 km	Kastelec	
Viaduct	238,3 km	Črni Kal Viaduct	Bridge - 1046 m / 1044 m
(49)	239,3 km	Črni Kal	
Tunnel	242,2 km	Dekani Tunnel	Tunnel - 2190 m / 2182 m
Viaduct	245,0 km	Lama Viaduct	Bridge - 86 m
(50)	245,3 km	Srmin Interchange	turns toward → Trieste (Italy) (European Union) or Koper
Viaduct	245,7 km	Bivje Viaduct	Bridge - 580 m / 563 m
(51)	246,8 km	Port of Koper (planned)	

== Tunnels ==
The motorway includes ten tunnels, two galleries and one covered cut:

- Gallery Dragučova right and left 160 m (520 ft)
- Vodole right 249 m (817 ft), Vodole left 247 m (810 ft)
- Covered cut Malečnik right and left 185 m (607 ft)
- Golo rebro right 788 m (2,585 ft), Golo rebro left 757 m (2,484 ft)
- Pletovarje right 708 m (2,323 ft), Pletovarje left 745 m (2,444 ft)
- Ločica right 750 m (2,460 ft), Ločica left 810 m (2,660 ft)
- Jasovnik right 1,633 m (5,358 ft), Jasovnik left 1,612 m (5,289 ft)
- Trojane right 2,840 m (9,320 ft), Trojane left 2,931 m (9,616 ft)
- Podmilj right 622 m (2,041 ft), Podmilj left 613 m (2,011 ft)
- Gallery Strmec right and left 200 m (660 ft)
- Golovec right 622 m (2,041 ft), Golovec left 595 m (1,952 ft)
- Kastelec right 2,195 m (7,201 ft), Kastelec left 2,303 m (7,556 ft)
- Dekani right 2,190 m (7,190 ft), Dekani left 2,181 m (7,156 ft)

== Bridges ==
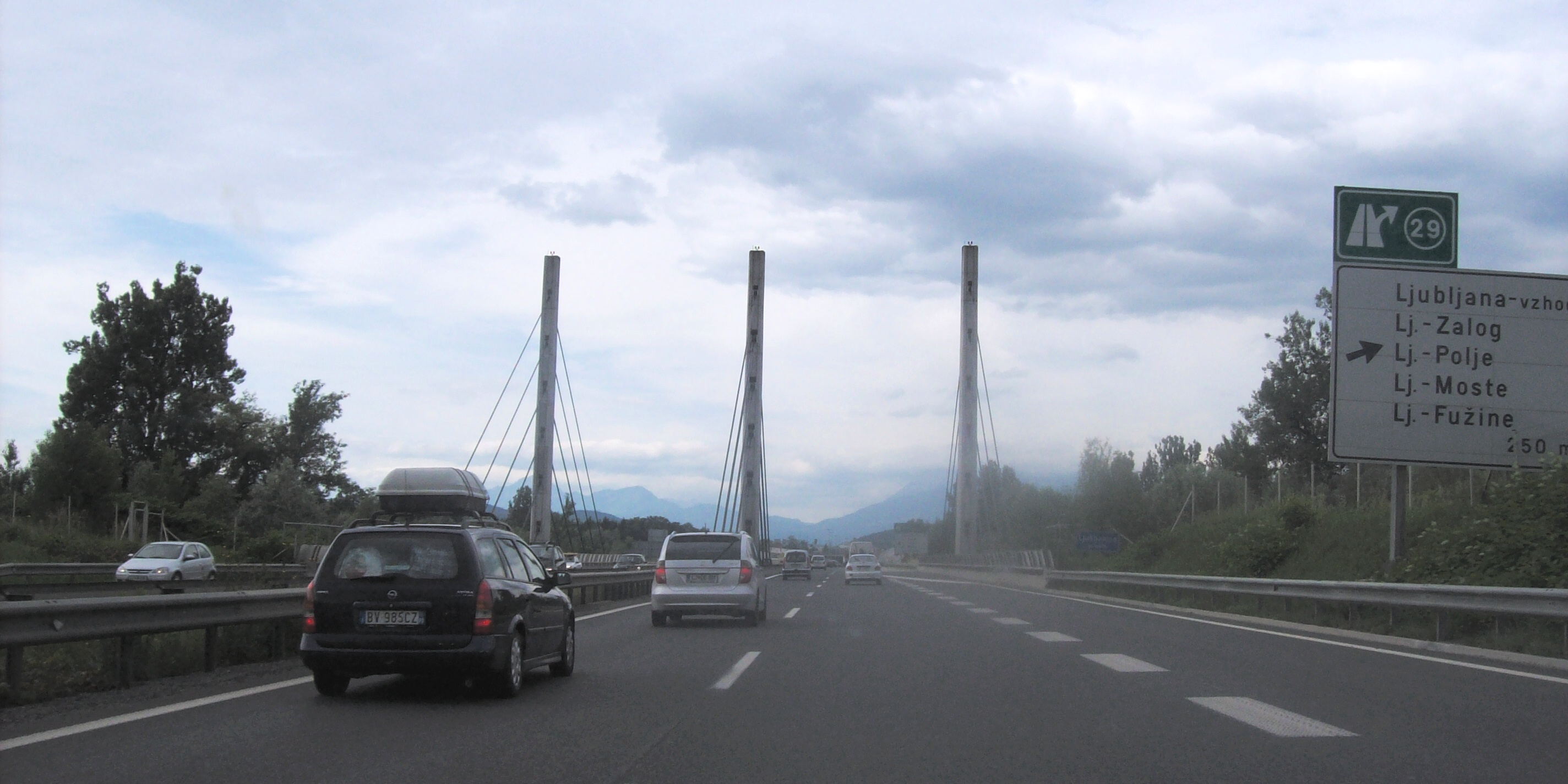
The "Harp Bridge" of the A1 motorway that crosses the Ljubljanica

Motorway A1 has 101 viaducts, 109 bridges, 129 overpass in 117 underpass.

Some of the largest viaduct in the A1 (span greater than 500 mm (20 in)):

- Kresnica right 587 m (1,926 ft) and left 587 m (1,926 ft)
- Pekel right 448 m (1,470 ft) and left 448 m (1,470 ft)
- Preloge right and left 558 m (1,831 ft)
- Škedenj I. right 466 m (1,529 ft) and left 563 m (1,847 ft)
- Ločica right 849 m (2,785 ft) and left 869 m (2,851 ft)
- Šentožbolt right 410 m (1,350 ft) and left 541 m (1,775 ft)
- Petelinjek right 622 m (2,041 ft) and left 634 m (2,080 ft)
- Blagovica right 446 m (1,463 ft) and left 426 m (1,398 ft)
- Verd right 620 m (2,030 ft) and left 586 m (1,923 ft)
- Ravbarkomanda right 591 m (1,939 ft) and left 533 m (1,749 ft)
- Črni kal right 1,046 m (3,432 ft) and left 1,048 m (3,438 ft)
- Bivje right 575 m (1,886 ft) and left 563 m (1,847 ft)

The Črni Kal Viaduct is the longest viaduct in Slovenia.
