= A5 motorway (Slovenia) =

Highway in Slovenia

A5 Motorway
- Avtocesta A5

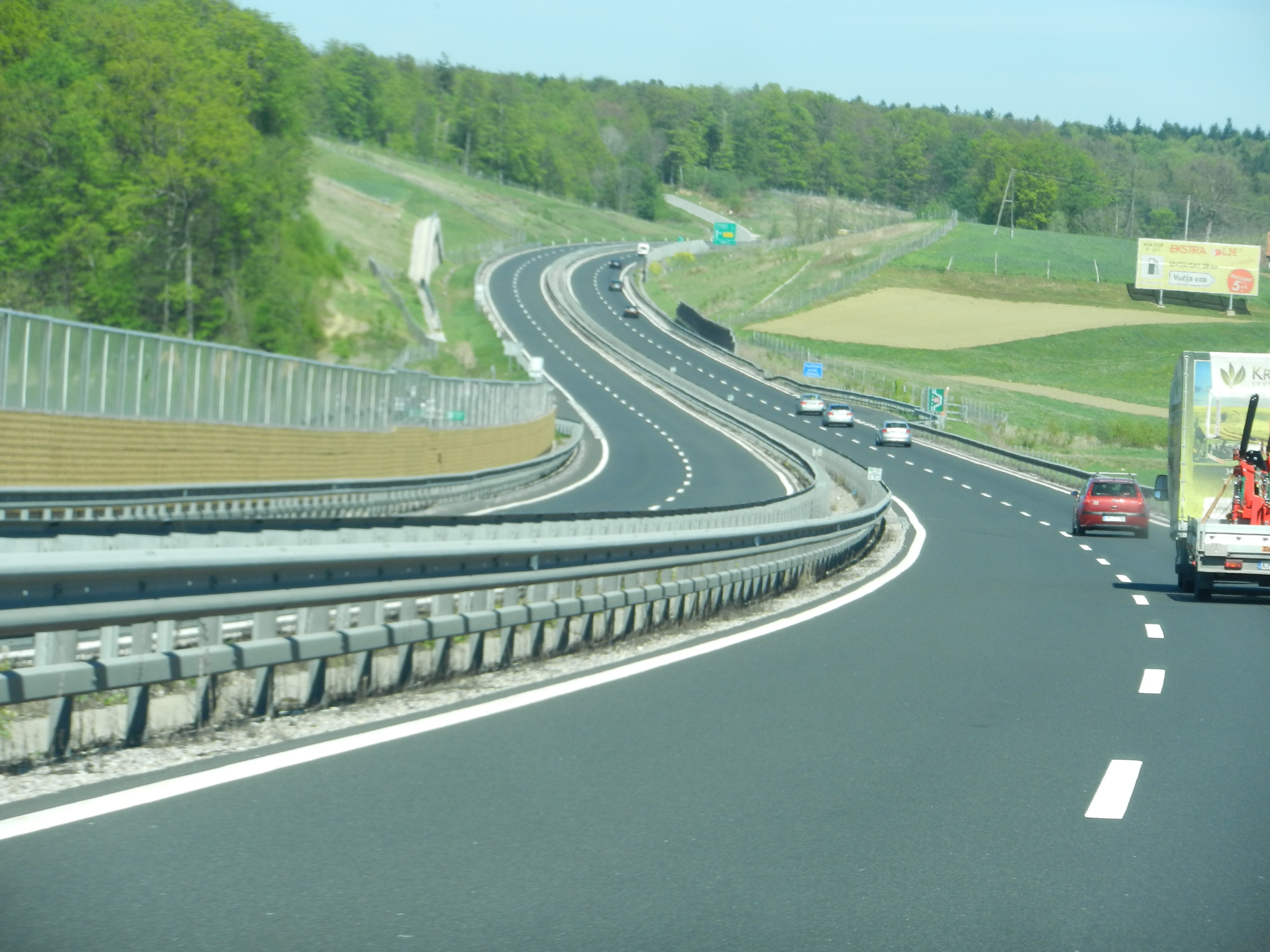

Route information
- Length: 79.6 km (49.5 mi)

Major junctions
- From: A1 near Dragučova
- To: Pince; M70 border with Hungary

Location
- Country: Slovenia
- Regions: Lower Styria, Prekmurje
- Major cities: Maribor, Murska Sobota, Lendava

Highway system
- Highways in Slovenia

The A5 motorway (Slovene: avtocesta A5, Pomurski krak) of Slovenia is 79.6 km long. It begins at the Dragučova interchange on the A1 motorway north of Maribor and ends at the Hungarian border at Pince, continuing on in Hungary as the M70 motorway. It connects Maribor with Budapest.

The first section was completed in 2003, whilst the last section was opened for traffic in October 2008.

== Junctions, exits and rest area ==
A5 (Dragučova) – Pince (79,56 km)
Interchange	x km	Dragučova interchange	A1 motorway (Slovenia)	A1 turns toward -> (Austria) or Ljubljana
(1)	x km	Pernica		
Viaduct		Močna Viaduct		Bridge - 166 / 167 m
Covered Cut		Močna covered cut		Tunnel - 360 m
(2)	x km	Lenart		
Petrol station Rest area	x km	Počivališče Lormanje		Petrol / MOL
(3)	x km	Sveta Trojica		
(4)	x km	Cerkvenjak		
Covered Cut		Cenkova covered cut		Tunnel - 258 / 241 m
Tunnel		Cenkova Tunnel		Tunnel - 357 / 361 m
Petrol station Rest area	x km	Počivališče Sv. Jurij	714	OMV / Petrol
(5)	x km	Sveti Jurij ob Ščavnici	714	OMV / Petrol
Dragotinci toll plaza
(6)	x km	Vučja Vas		
Bridge		Mur River		Bridge - 833 / 877 m
(7)	x km	Murska Sobota		
Petrol station Rest area	x km	Počivališče Murska Sobota		Petrol / Petrol
(8)	x km	Lipovci	232	
(9)	x km	Gančani		
Rest area	x km	Počivališče Dolisko		
(10)	x km	Turnišče		
(11)	x km	Dolga Vas interchange		H7 turns toward -> (Hungary)
(12)	x km	Lendava	443	
Petrol station Rest area	x km	Počivališče Pince		Petrol / MOL
(13)	x km	Pince		Petrol / MOL
Border control	x km	Pince (SLO) – Tornyiszentmiklós (H) border crossing		
M70 expressway → to Budapest, Hungary

== European Route(s) ==
Name	Route
	79,6 km	Dragučova (3) – (Hungary) M70-es autóút
