= Razdrto, Postojna =

Razdrto
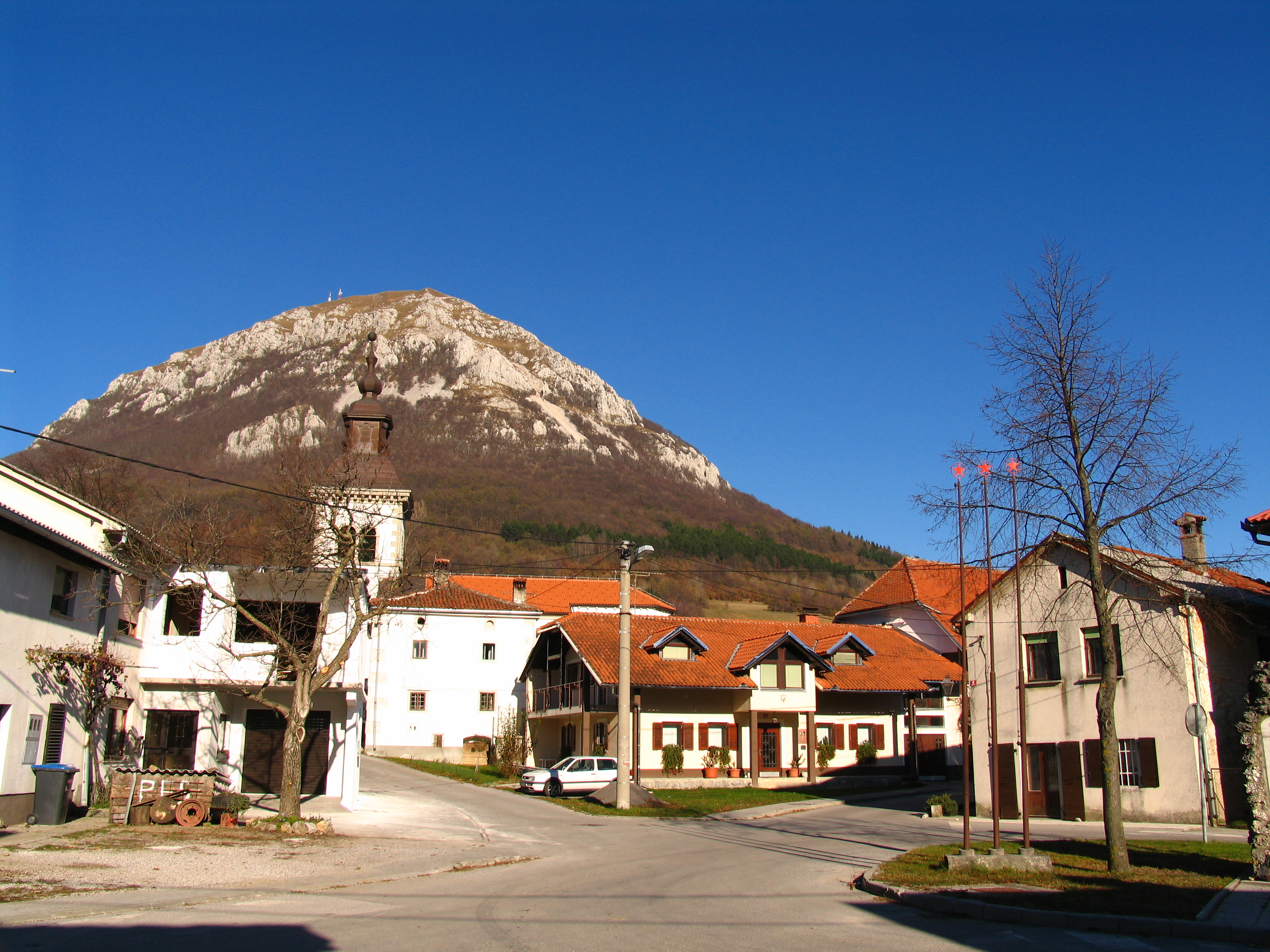

- Location in Slovenia
- Coordinates: 45°45′24.15″N 14°3′35.3″E
- Country: Slovenia
- Traditional region: Inner Carniola
- Statistical region: Littoral–Inner Carniola
- Municipality: Postojna

Area
  - Total: 5.39 km^{2} (2.08 sq mi)
- Elevation: 573.9 m (1,883 ft)

Population (2002)
  - Total: 168

Razdrto (pronounced [ɾaˈzdərtɔ]; German: Präwald, Italian: Resderta, Prevallo) is a village below and on the southern slopes of the Nanos Plateau in the Municipality of Postojna in the Inner Carniola region of Slovenia. It lies at a major interchange on the A1 motorway connecting Ljubljana to the Slovenian Littoral.

== Name ==
The name Razdrto is shared with other settlements in Slovenia. It is derived from Slavic *orzdьrto(je) (poľe) 'cleared (field)', referring to early settlement and agricultural use of the area.

== Church ==
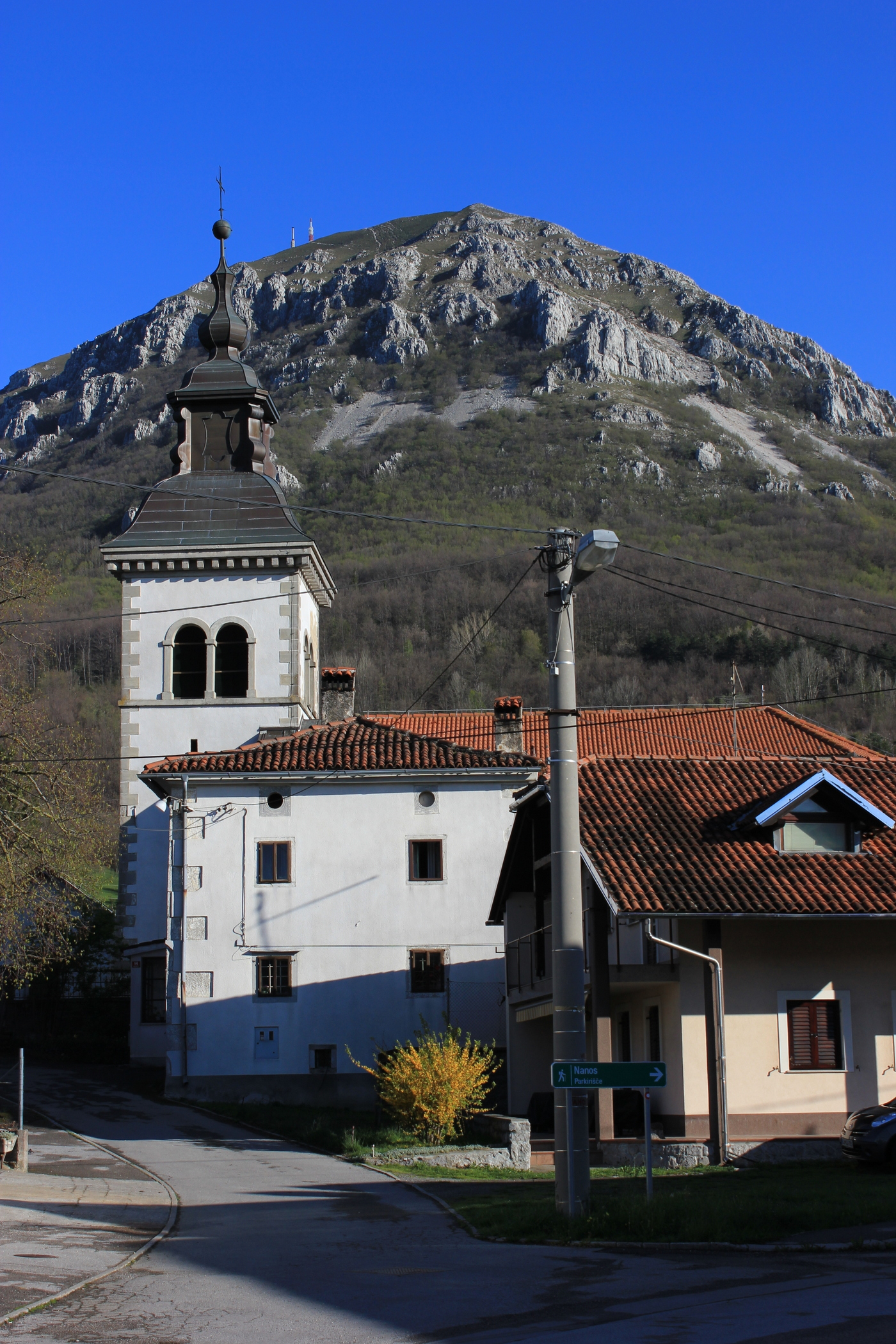
Holy Trinity Church with the Nanos Plateau in the background

The local church in the settlement is dedicated to the Holy Trinity and belongs to the Parish of Ubeljsko.
