= Ljubljana Ring Road =

Highway in Slovenia

- Ljubljanska obvoznica
- The Ljubljana Ring Road

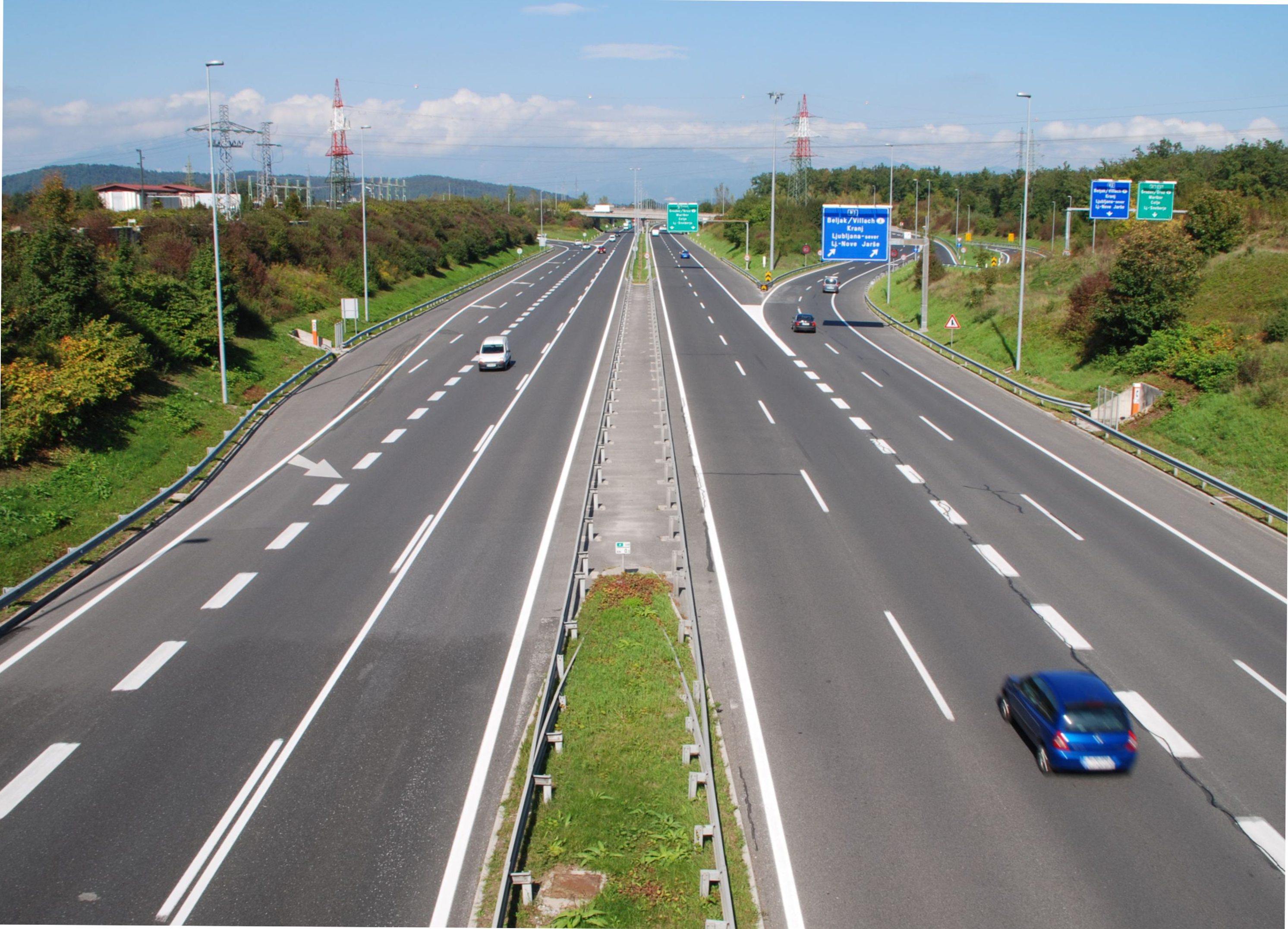
- The eastern Ljubljana bypass.

Route information
- Maintained by Urban Municipality of Ljubljana
- Length: 29.1 km (18.1 mi)

Location
- Country: Slovenia

Highway system
- Highways in Slovenia

The Ljubljana Ring Road (Slovene: ljubljanska obvoznica, ljubljanski obroč) is a motorway ring road around the city of Ljubljana. The ring road forms the main hub of the Slovenian motorway network and connects to the A1 and A2 motorways. It was built from 1979 till 1999 and consists of four bypass sections: the northern bypass (ljubljanska severna obvoznica), the eastern bypass (ljubljanska vzhodna obvoznica), the southern bypass (ljubljanska južna obvoznica), and the western bypass (ljubljanska zahodna obvoznica). The ring road itself is signed as the A1 on the southern and eastern parts, the A2 on the western and southern parts, while the northern sections are signed as the H3 expressway. The outer ring is 29.1 km long, while the inner ring is 28.65 km long. The average daily traffic (AADT) is the highest on the northern sections and at more than 70,000 vehicles is also the highest in Slovenia. A toll sticker system has been in use on the Ljubljana Ring Road since 1 July 2008.
