= Log, Lukovica =

Log
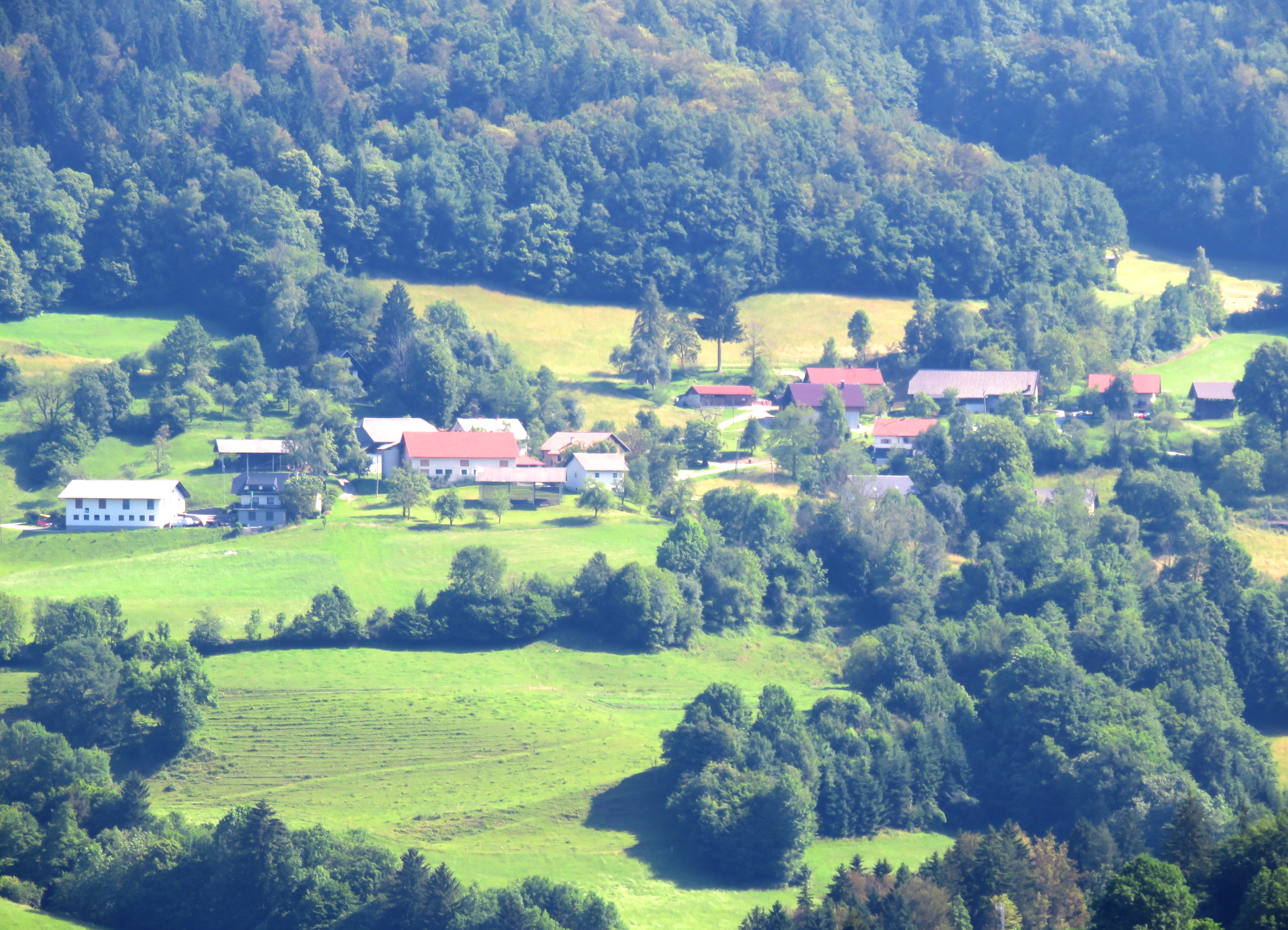

- Location in Slovenia
- Coordinates: 46°11′15.26″N 14°50′14.25″E
- Country: Slovenia
- Traditional region: Upper Carniola
- Statistical region: Central Slovenia
- Municipality: Lukovica

Area
  - Total: 1.11 km^{2} (0.43 sq mi)
- Elevation: 596.5 m (1,957 ft)

Population (2002)
  - Total: 17

Log (pronounced [ˈloːk]) is a small settlement in the hills northeast of Blagovica in the Municipality of Lukovica in the eastern part of the Upper Carniola region of Slovenia.
