= Podmilj =

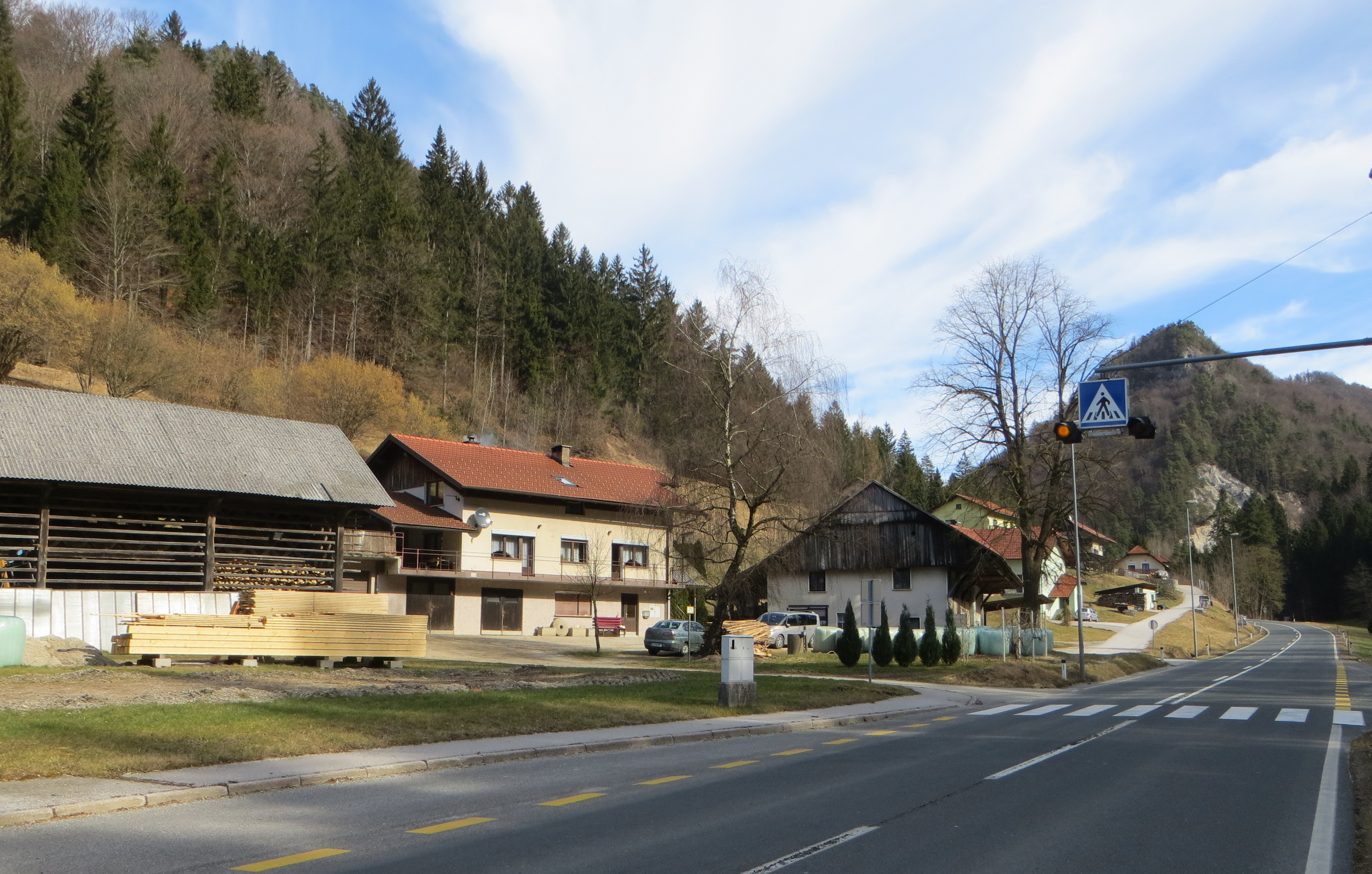

- Location in Slovenia
- Coordinates: 46°10′33.83″N 14°50′35.82″E
- Country: Slovenia
- Traditional region: Upper Carniola
- Statistical region: Central Slovenia
- Municipality: Lukovica

Area
  - Total: 3.72 km^{2} (1.44 sq mi)
- Elevation: 472.5 m (1,550 ft)

Population (2002)
  - Total: 48

Podmilj (pronounced [pɔdˈmiːl]) is a dispersed settlement east of Blagovica in the Municipality of Lukovica in the eastern part of the Upper Carniola region of Slovenia.
