= Javorje pri Blagovici =

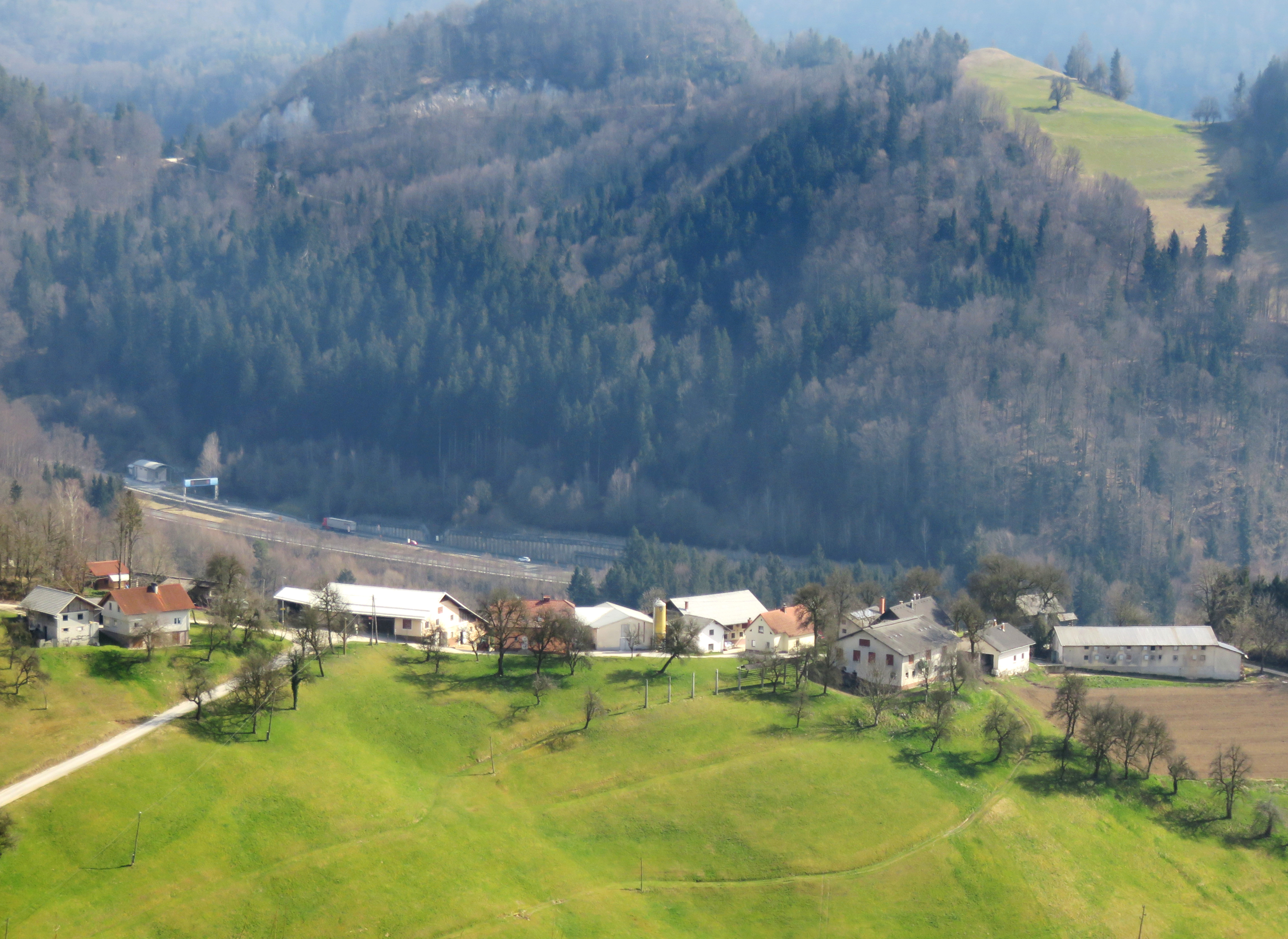

- Location in Slovenia
- Coordinates: 46°11′13″N 14°49′52″E
- Country: Slovenia
- Traditional region: Upper Carniola
- Statistical region: Central Slovenia
- Municipality: Lukovica

Area
  - Total: 0.78 km^{2} (0.30 sq mi)
- Elevation: 570.5 m (1,872 ft)

Population (2002)
  - Total: 22

Javorje pri Blagovici (pronounced [ˈjaːʋɔɾjɛ pɾi blaˈɡoːʋitsi]) is a small settlement in the hills northeast of Blagovica in the Municipality of Lukovica in the eastern part of the Upper Carniola region of Slovenia.
