= Vranke =

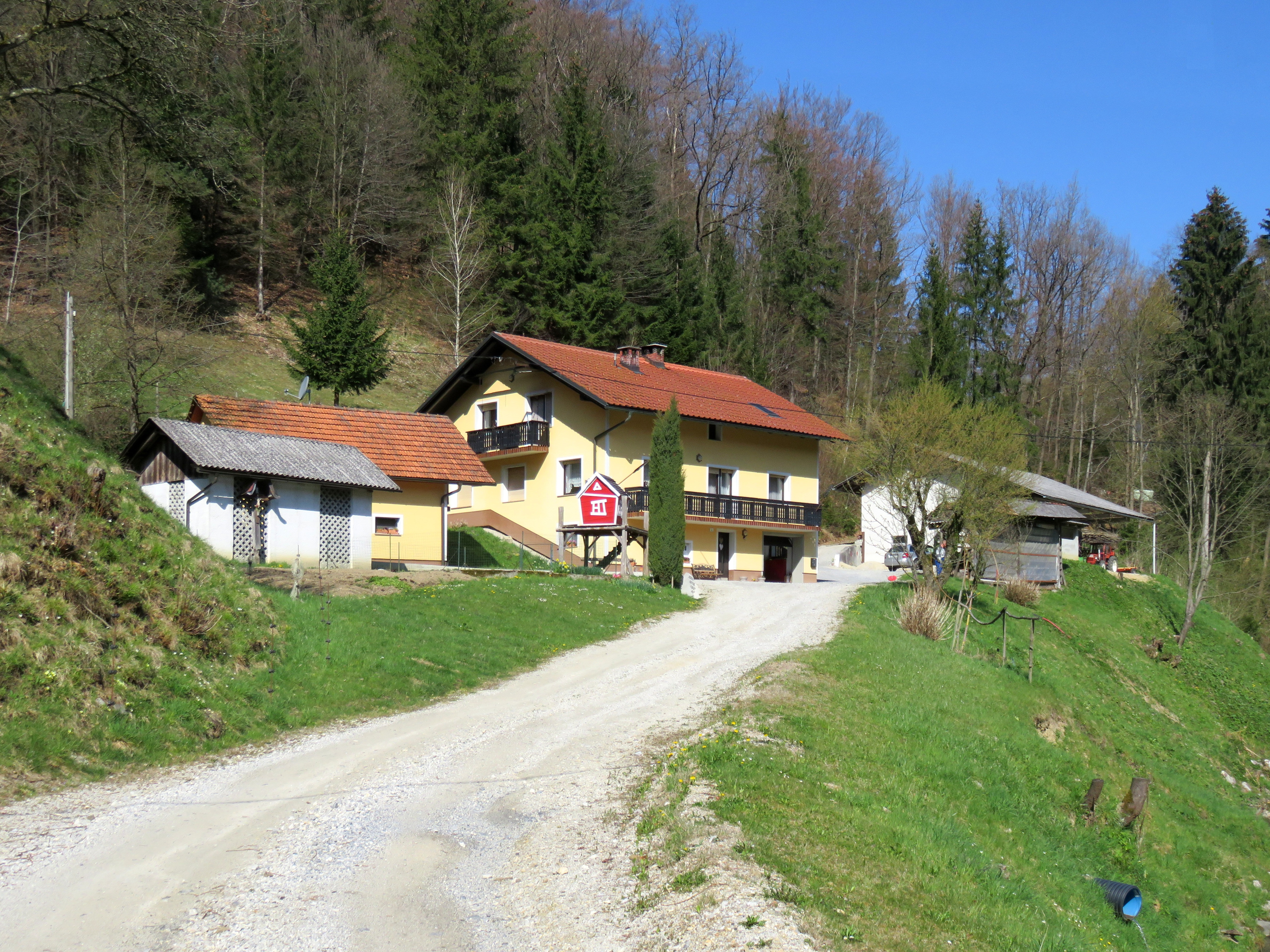

- Location in Slovenia
- Coordinates: 46°10′19.14″N 14°49′18″E
- Country: Slovenia
- Traditional region: Upper Carniola
- Statistical region: Central Slovenia
- Municipality: Lukovica

Area
  - Total: 0.69 km^{2} (0.27 sq mi)
- Elevation: 554.4 m (1,819 ft)

Population (2002)
  - Total: 11

Vranke (pronounced [ˈwraːŋkɛ]) is a small settlement east of Blagovica in the Municipality of Lukovica in Central Slovenia.

== Name ==
Vranke was attested in written sources as Vranygk in 1477.
