= Ločica pri Vranskem =

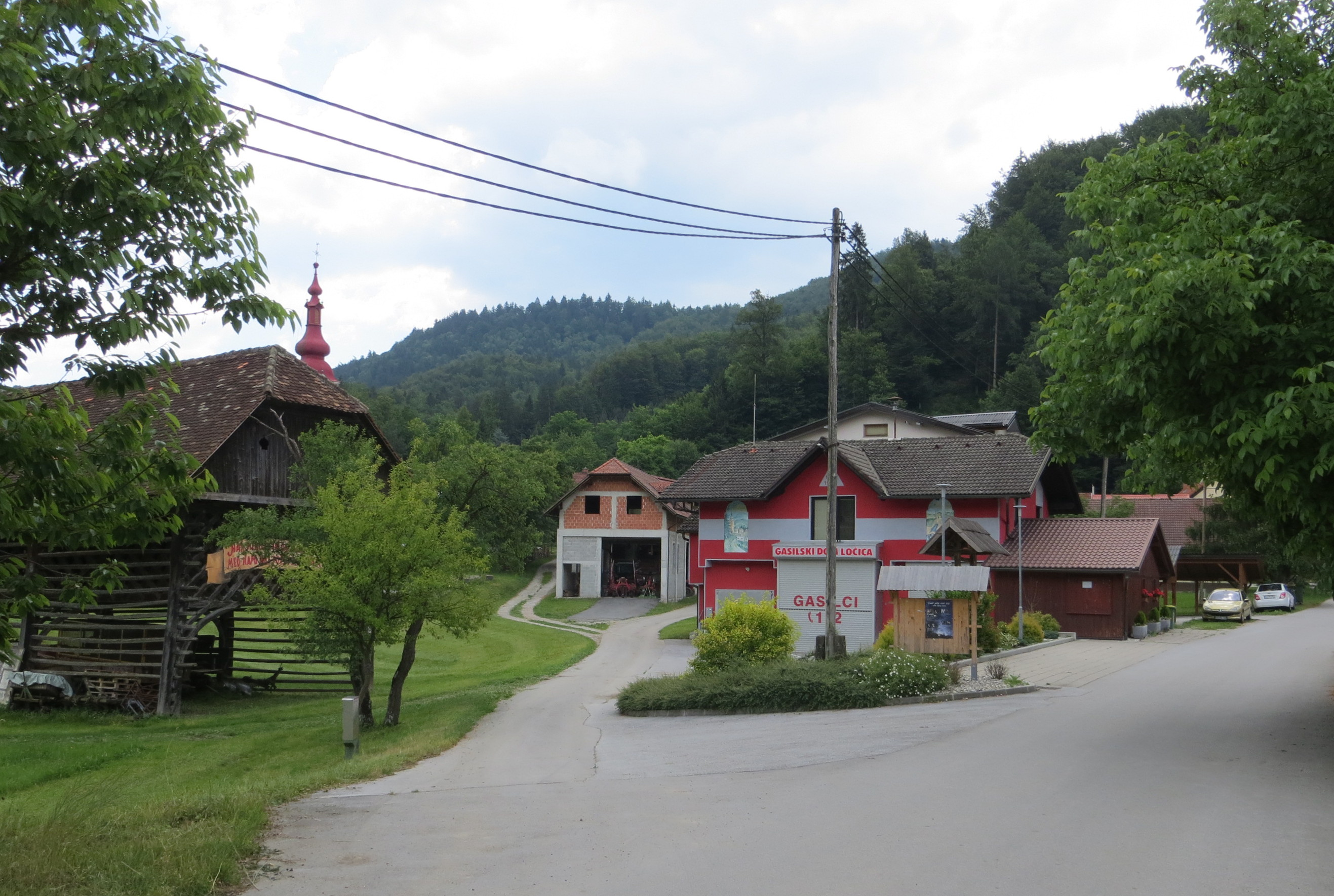

- Location in Slovenia
- Coordinates: 46°13′33.61″N 14°56′45.86″E
- Country: Slovenia
- Traditional region: Styria
- Statistical region: Savinja
- Municipality: Vransko

Area
  - Total: 7 km^{2} (2.7 sq mi)
- Elevation: 365.4 m (1,199 ft)

Population (2002)
  - Total: 151

Ločica pri Vranskem (pronounced [lɔˈtʃiːtsa pɾi ˈwɾaːnskɛm]) is a settlement in the Municipality of Vransko in central Slovenia. It lies at the crossroads of the regional roads leading to Kamnik, Celje, and Ljubljana in the valley of Bolska Creek, a right tributary of the Savinja River. The Slovenian A1 motorway passes just east of the village core. The area is part of the traditional region of Styria. The municipality is now included in the Savinja Statistical Region. It includes the hamlets of Bistrica, Brce, Jakov Dol, and Osredek.

== Name ==
The name of the settlement was changed from Ločica to Ločica pri Vranskem in 1953.

== Church ==
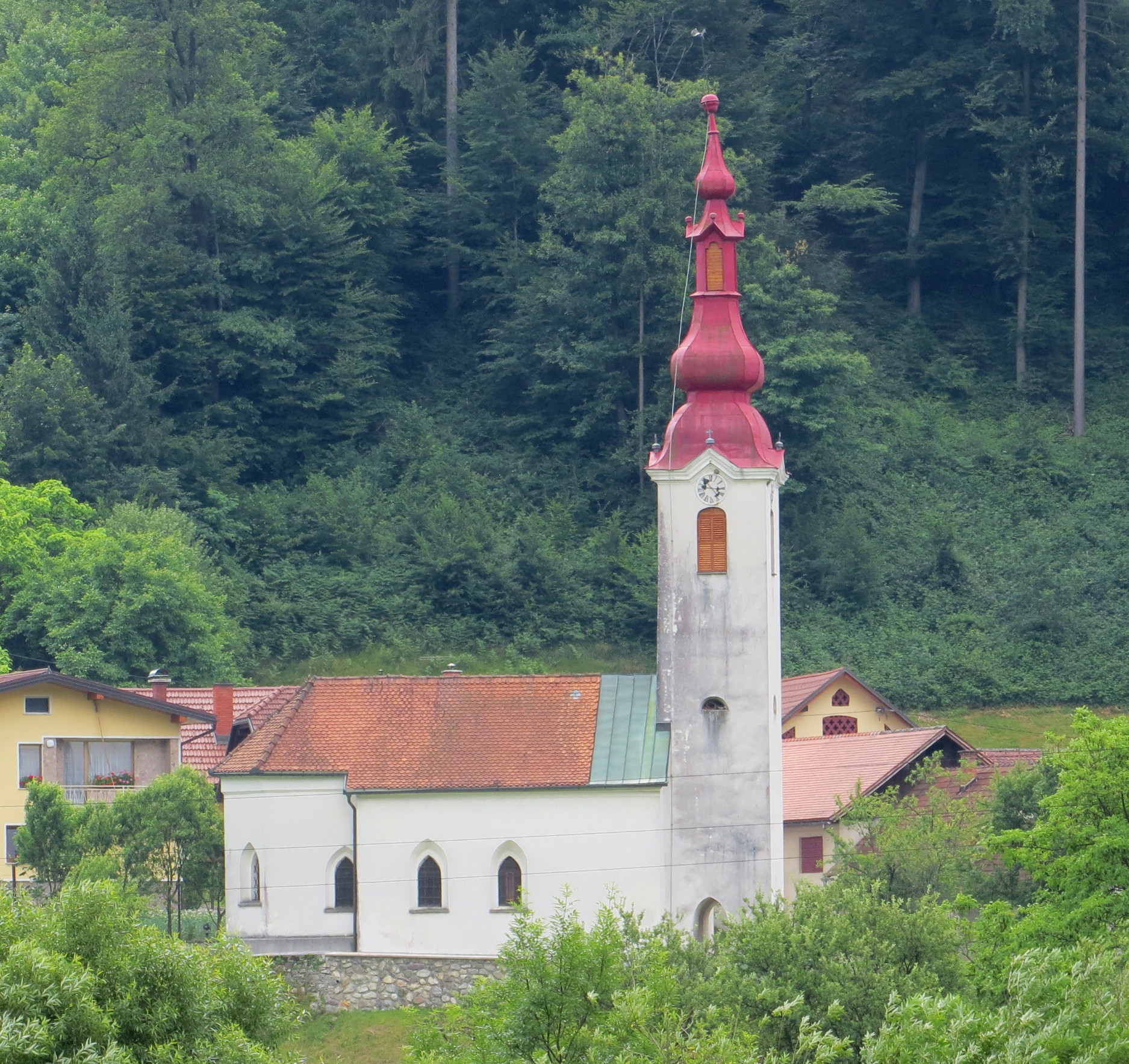
Mary Magdalene Church

The local church is dedicated to Mary Magdalene and belongs to the Parish of Vransko. It dates to the 16th century with some later rebuilding and extensions.

== Gallery ==
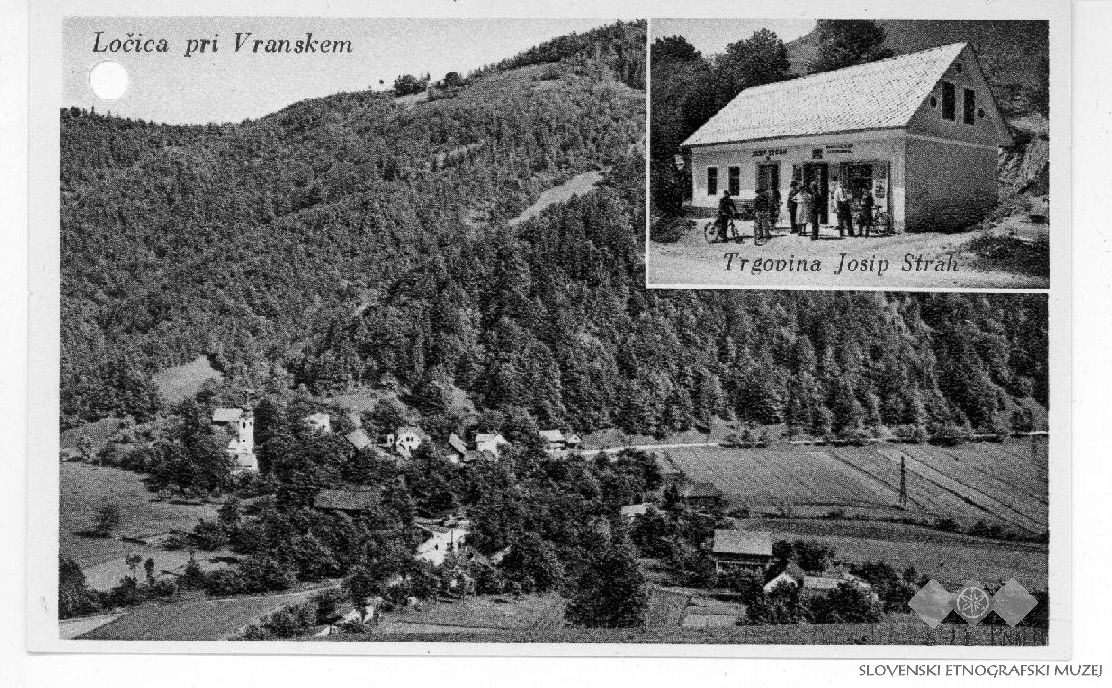
Historical postcard of Ločica pri Vranskem

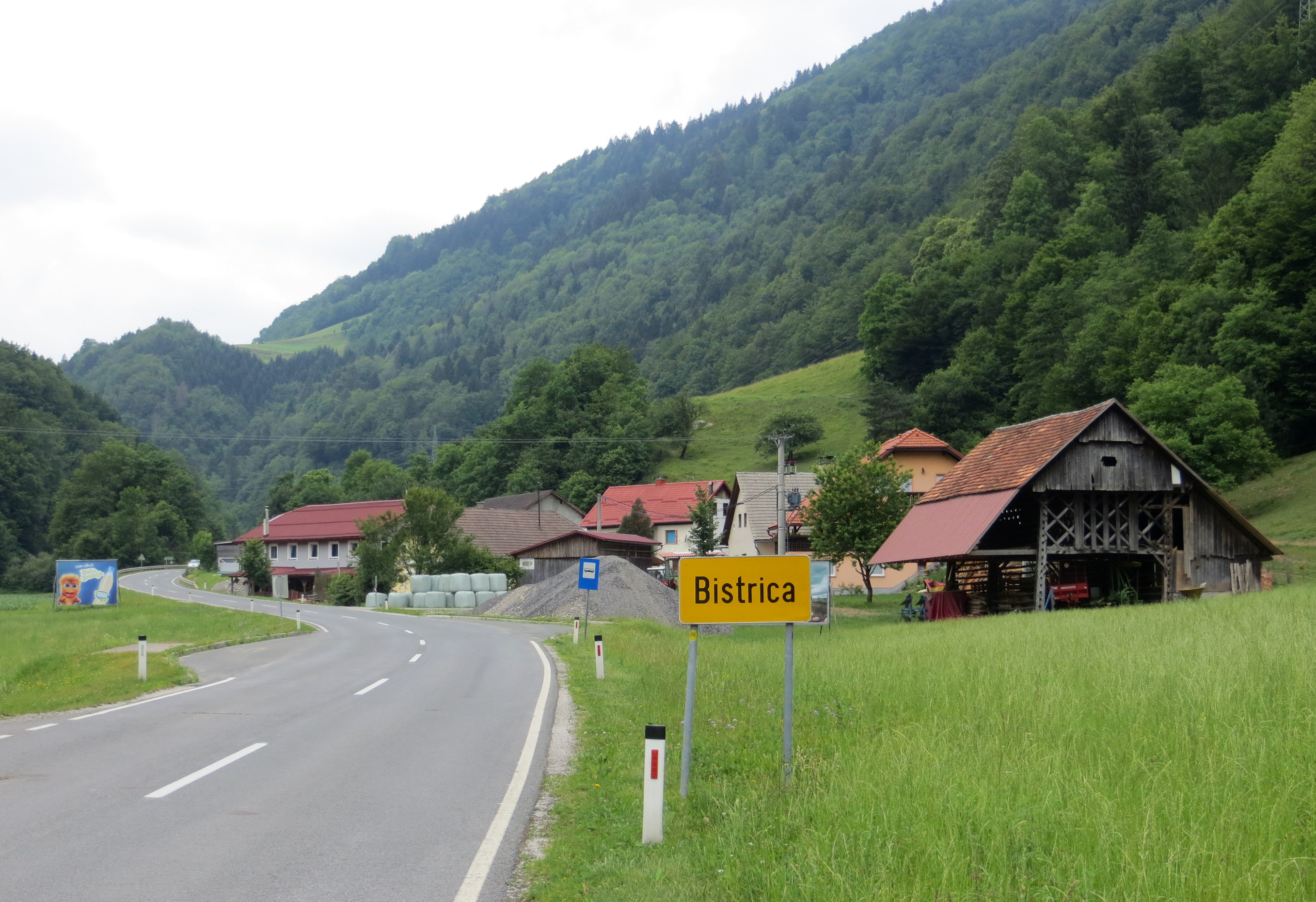
The hamlet of Bistrica

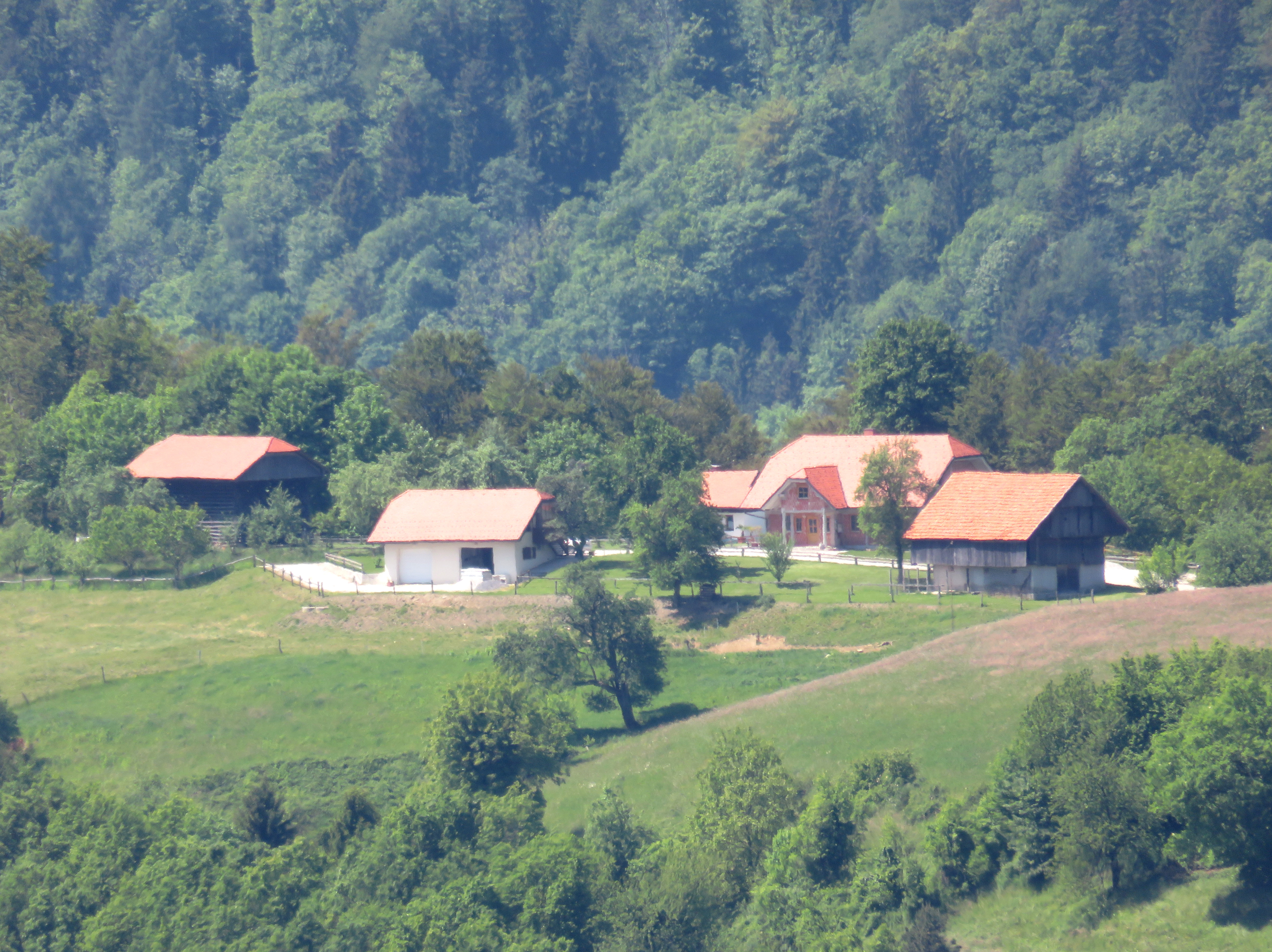
The hamlet of Osredek
