= Kresnica =

- Location in Slovenia
- Coordinates: 46°40′29.34″N 15°38′4.07″E
- Country: Slovenia
- Traditional region: Styria
- Statistical region: Drava
- Municipality: Šentilj

Area
  - Total: 2.46 km^{2} (0.95 sq mi)
- Elevation: 379.4 m (1,245 ft)

Population (2002)
  - Total: 135

Kresnica (pronounced [kɾɛˈsniːtsa]) is a dispersed settlement in the Slovene Hills (Slovene: Slovenske gorice) west of Šentilj v Slovenskih Goricah in the Municipality of Šentilj in northeastern Slovenia.
