= Kompolje, Lukovica =

Kompolje
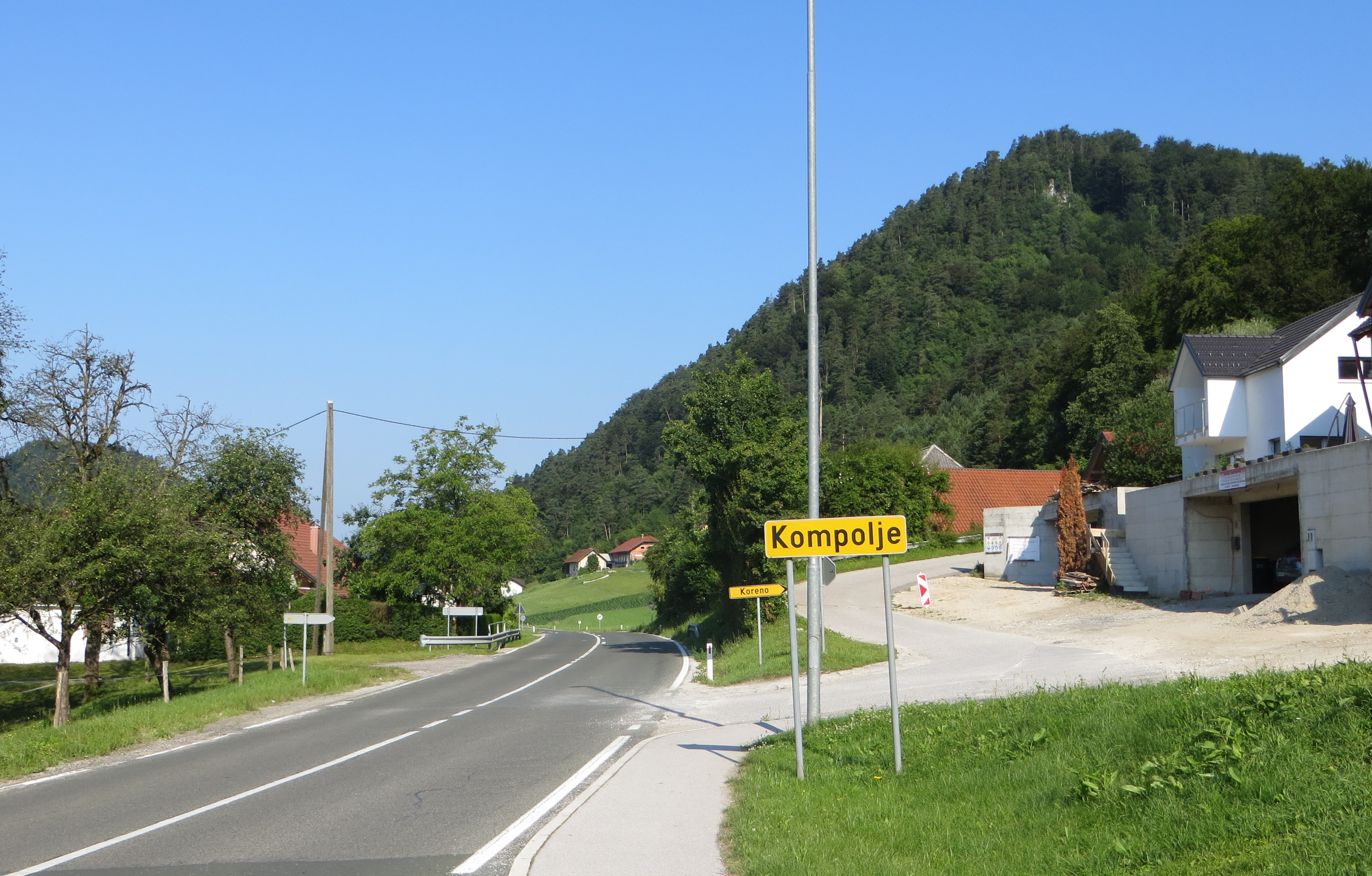

- Location in Slovenia
- Coordinates: 46°10′18.5″N 14°43′46.97″E
- Country: Slovenia
- Traditional region: Upper Carniola
- Statistical region: Central Slovenia
- Municipality: Lukovica

Area
  - Total: 1.22 km^{2} (0.47 sq mi)
- Elevation: 356.4 m (1,169 ft)

Population (2002)
  - Total: 33

Kompolje (pronounced [ˈkoːmpɔljɛ]) is a small settlement on the main road from Ljubljana to Celje in the Municipality of Lukovica in the eastern part of the Upper Carniola region of Slovenia.
