= Rudnik (Ljubljana) =

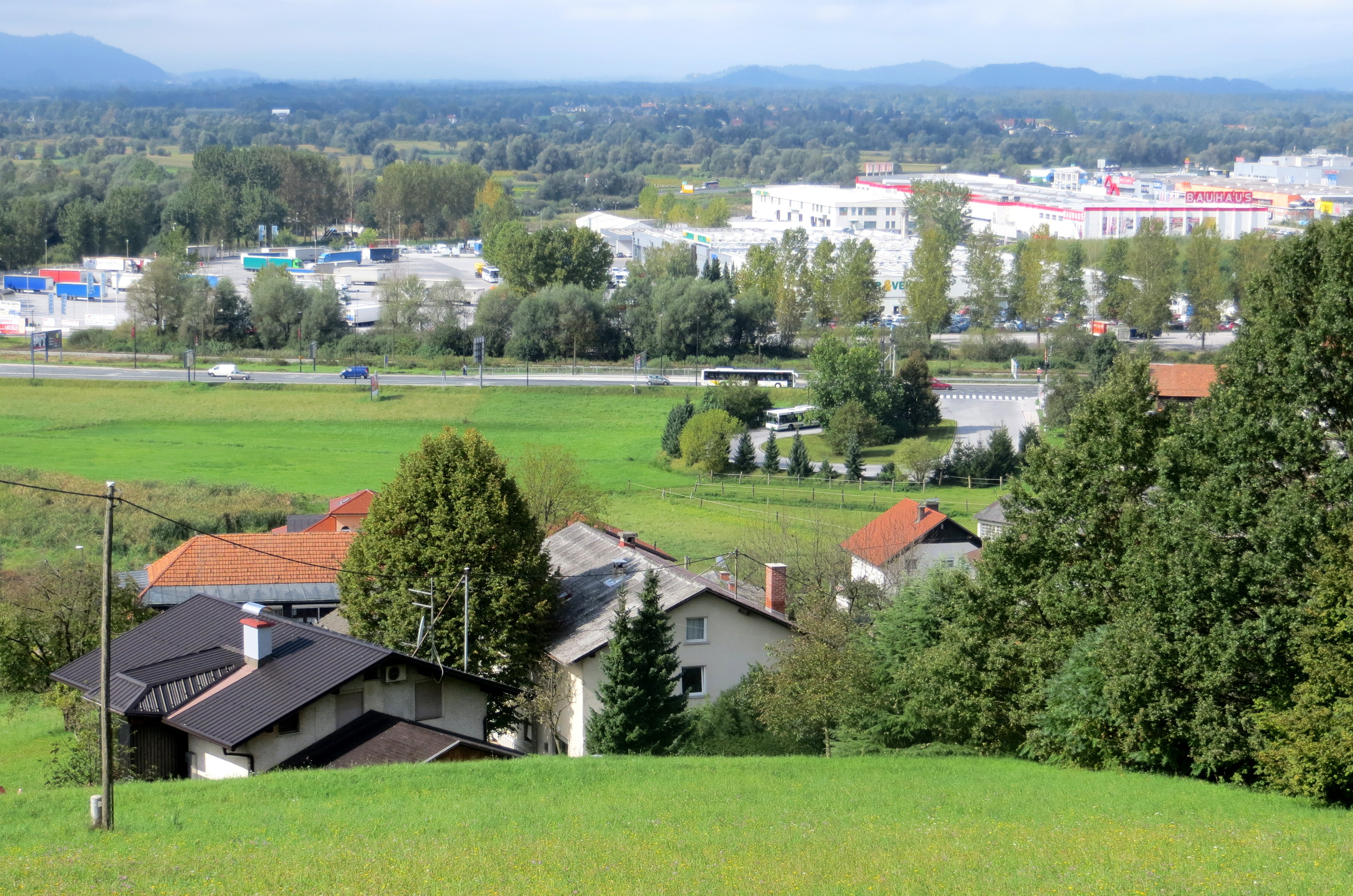

- Location in Slovenia
- Coordinates: 46°1′8.01″N 14°32′43.34″E
- Country: Slovenia
- Traditional region: Lower Carniola
- Statistical region: Central Slovenia
- Municipality: Ljubljana
- Elevation: 295 m (968 ft)

Rudnik (pronounced [ˈɾuːdnik]) is a former village that is now included in the southern part of Ljubljana, the capital of Slovenia. It is part of the traditional region of Lower Carniola.

== Name ==
The name Rudnik is derived from the Slovene common noun rudnik 'mine, mining operation'.

== History ==
A school was established in Rudnik in 1871. The older village farms lie on the slopes west of Lower Carniola Street (Slovene: Dolenjska cesta), but by the early 20th century newer houses had been built along the street up to the city limits of Ljubljana. In 1931 the village had a population of 508 people living in 86 houses. Rudnik was annexed by the City of Ljubljana in 1961, ending its existence as a separate settlement.

== Church ==
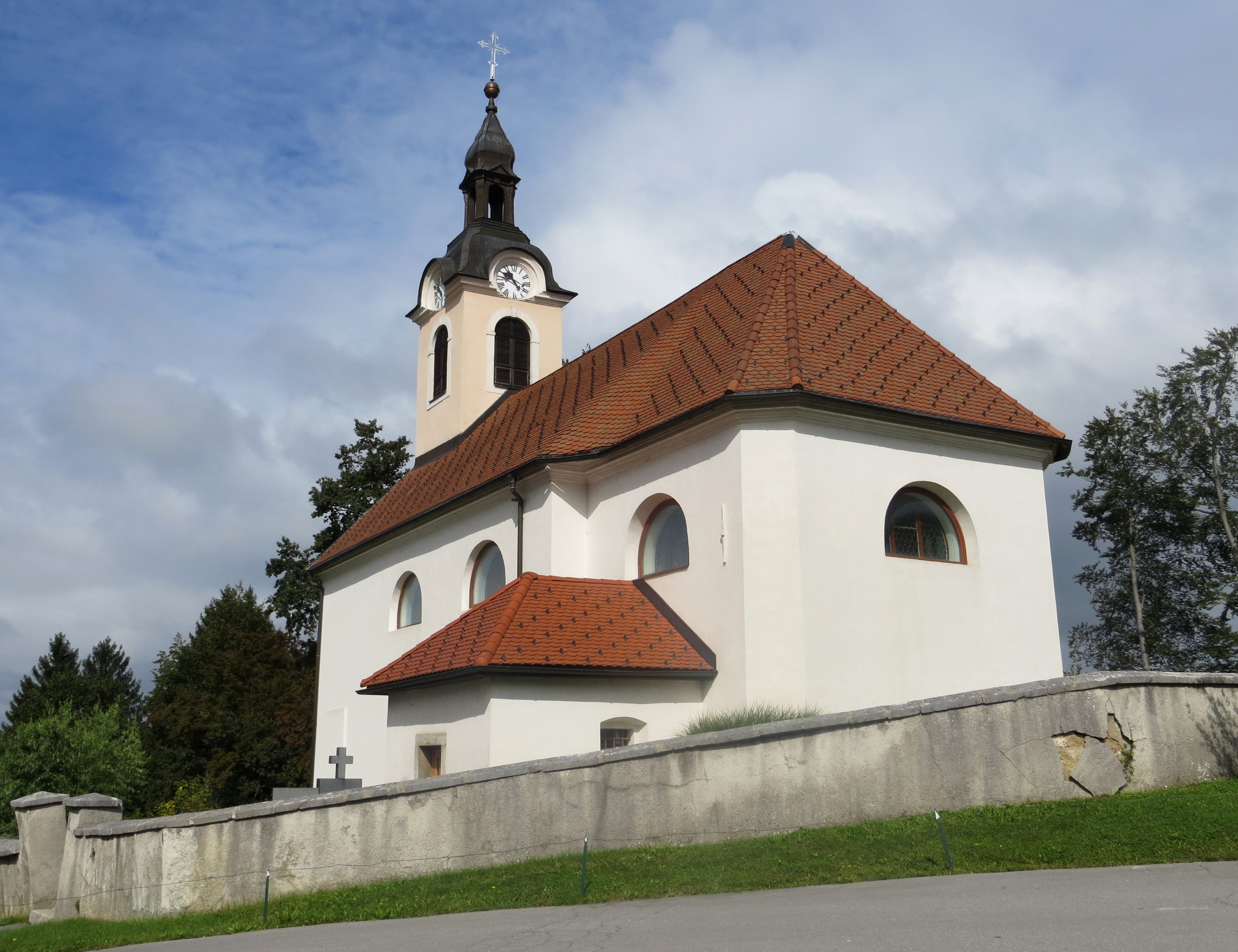
Saints Simon and Jude Church

The parish church in Rudnik is dedicated to Saints Simon and Jude. The church was originally built in the Gothic style and was first mentioned in written sources in 1462. It was remodeled in the Baroque style in 1753. A wall fresco of Saint Christopher from 1500 has been moved into the belfry. The church's main altar is late Baroque, from the second half of the 18th century. It features statues of Saints Simon and Jude, and the Virgin and Child. The church was originally part of the proto-parish of Saint Peter in Ljubljana. It was elevated to a vicariate in 1787, and it became a parish in its own right in 1875.

The village cemetery lies west of the church. In the past, the cemetery also circled the church, but in 1970 this section of the cemetery was removed and its gravestones were attached to the cemetery wall as a memorial.

== Gallery ==
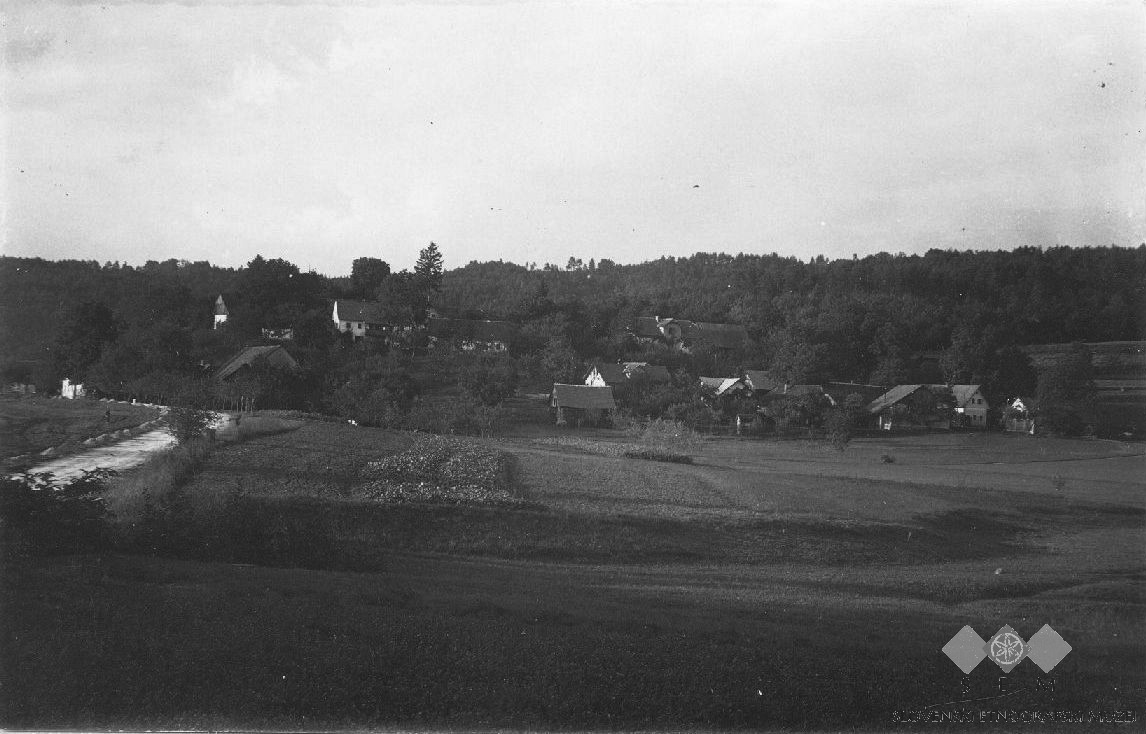
Historical postcard of Rudnik

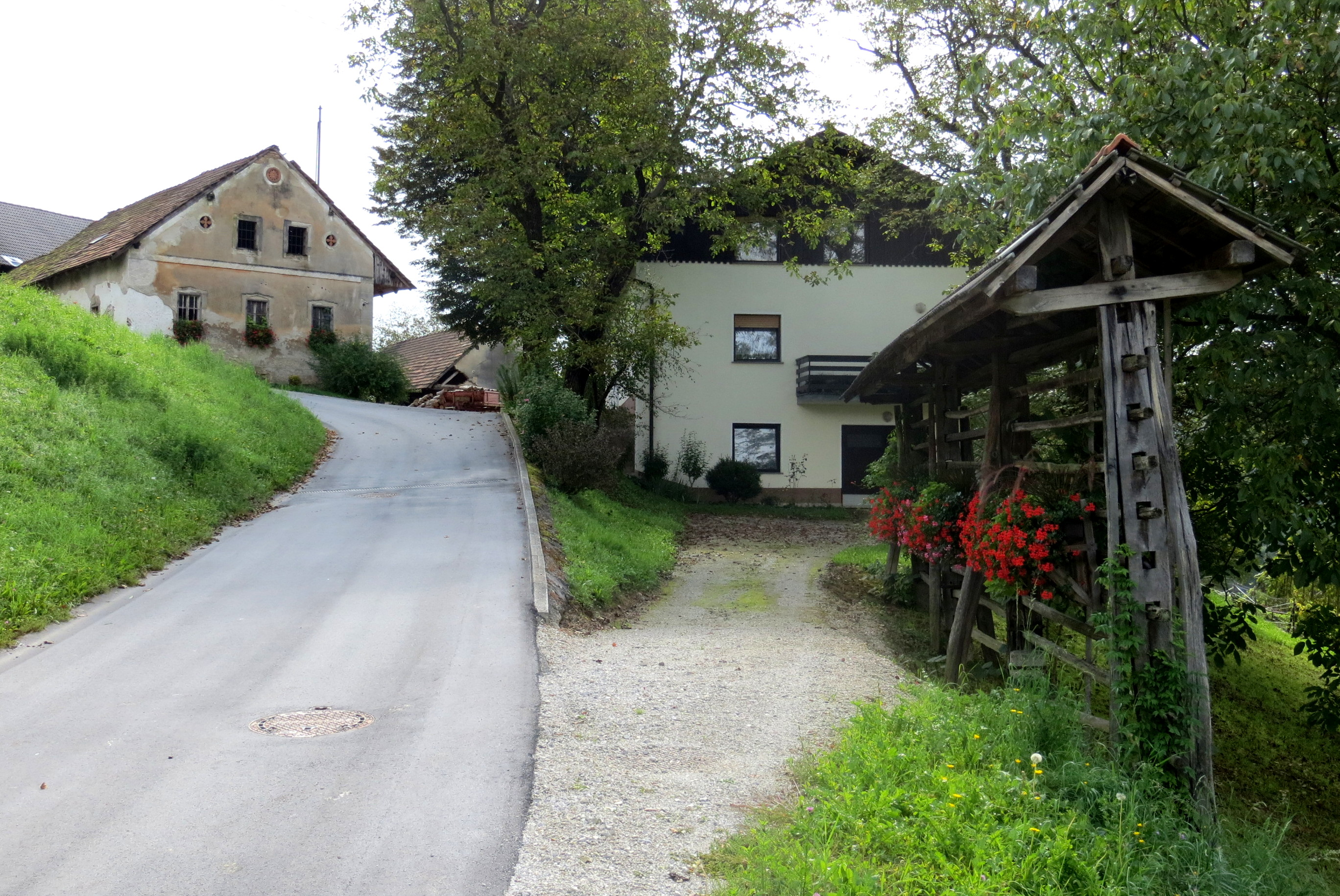
Old part of Rudnik
