= Šentožbolt =

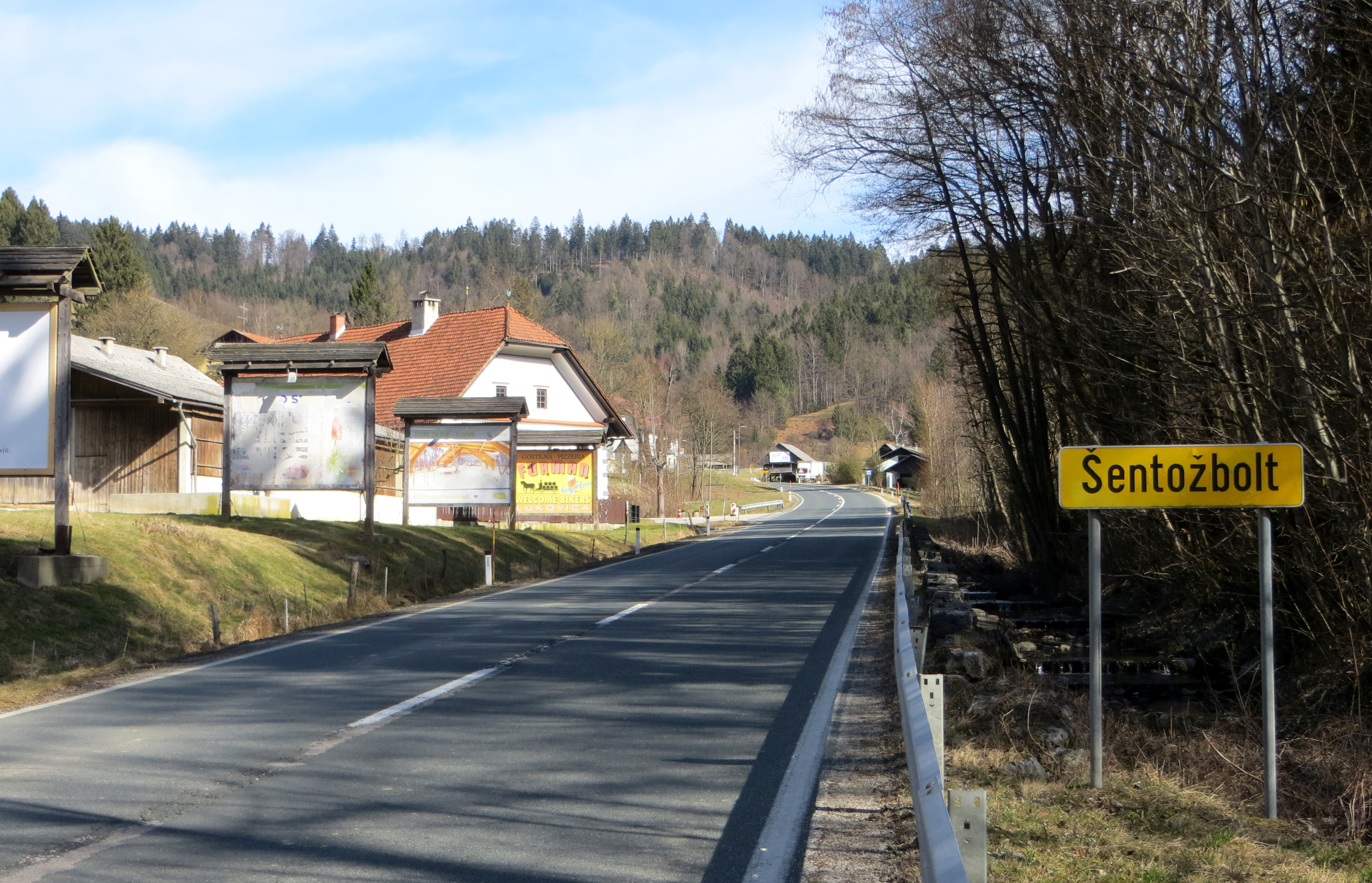

- Location in Slovenia
- Coordinates: 46°11′7.6″N 14°51′39.15″E
- Country: Slovenia
- Traditional region: Upper Carniola
- Statistical region: Central Slovenia
- Municipality: Lukovica

Area
  - Total: 0.67 km^{2} (0.26 sq mi)
- Elevation: 529.4 m (1,737 ft)

Population (2002)
  - Total: 46

Šentožbolt (pronounced [ʃɛnˈtoːʒbɔlt] or [ʃənˈtoːʒbɔlt]; German: Sankt Oswald) is a settlement west of Trojane in the Municipality of Lukovica in the eastern part of the Upper Carniola region of Slovenia.

== Name ==
The settlement gets its name from the local church.

== Church ==
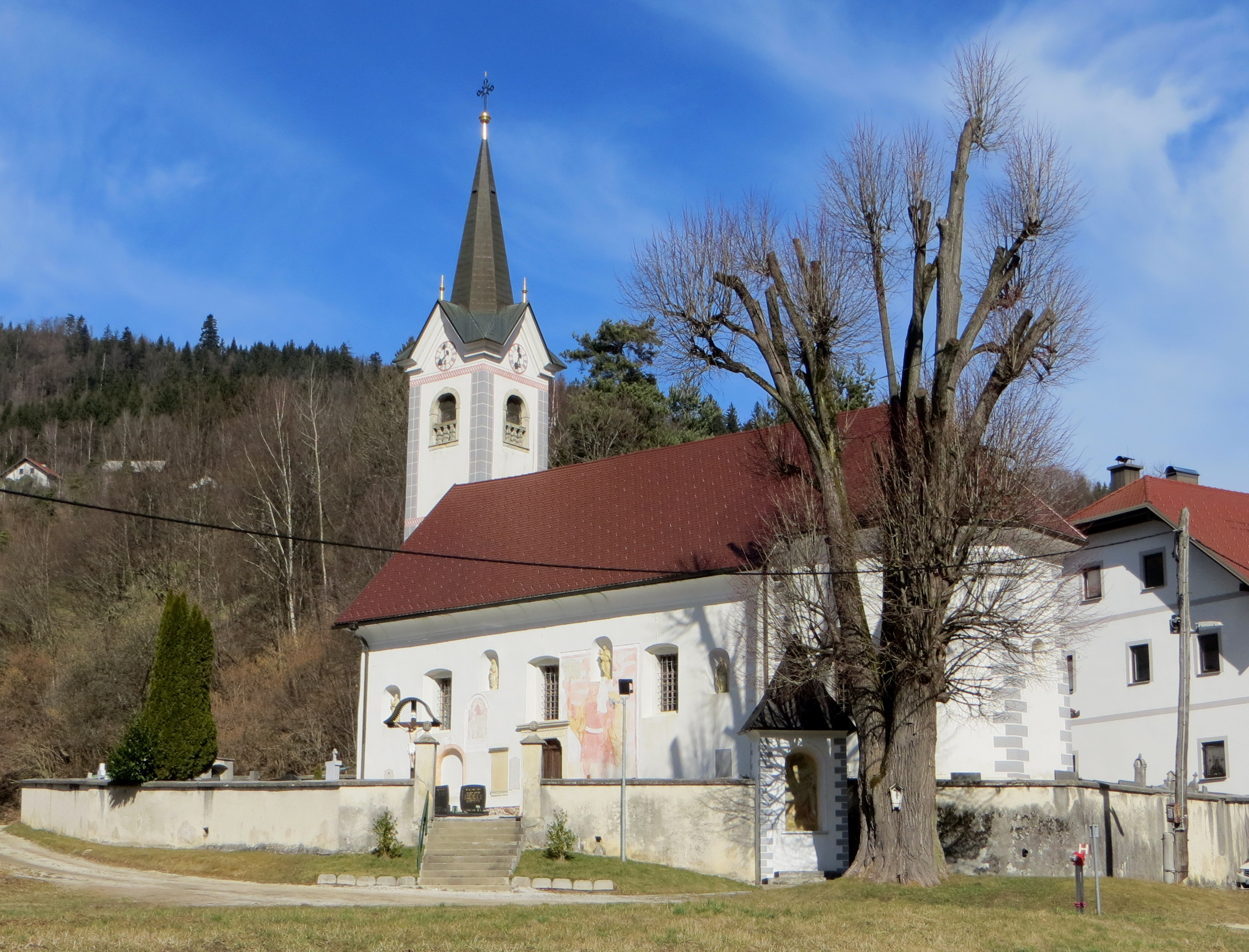
Saint Oswald's Church

The church in Šentožbolt is dedicated to Saint Oswald. It is a single-nave structure with a polygonal chancel oriented toward the east, and it was first mentioned in written records in 1526. The church was remodeled in the Baroque style in 1621, and remodeled again in 1825. An old fresco is preserved on the exterior wall. The furnishings in the church are late Baroque. The painting of Saint Bartholomew in the church is the work of Leopold Layer (1752–1828). The church was designated a vicariate in 1787 and the seat of a parish in 1876.
