= Škedenj =

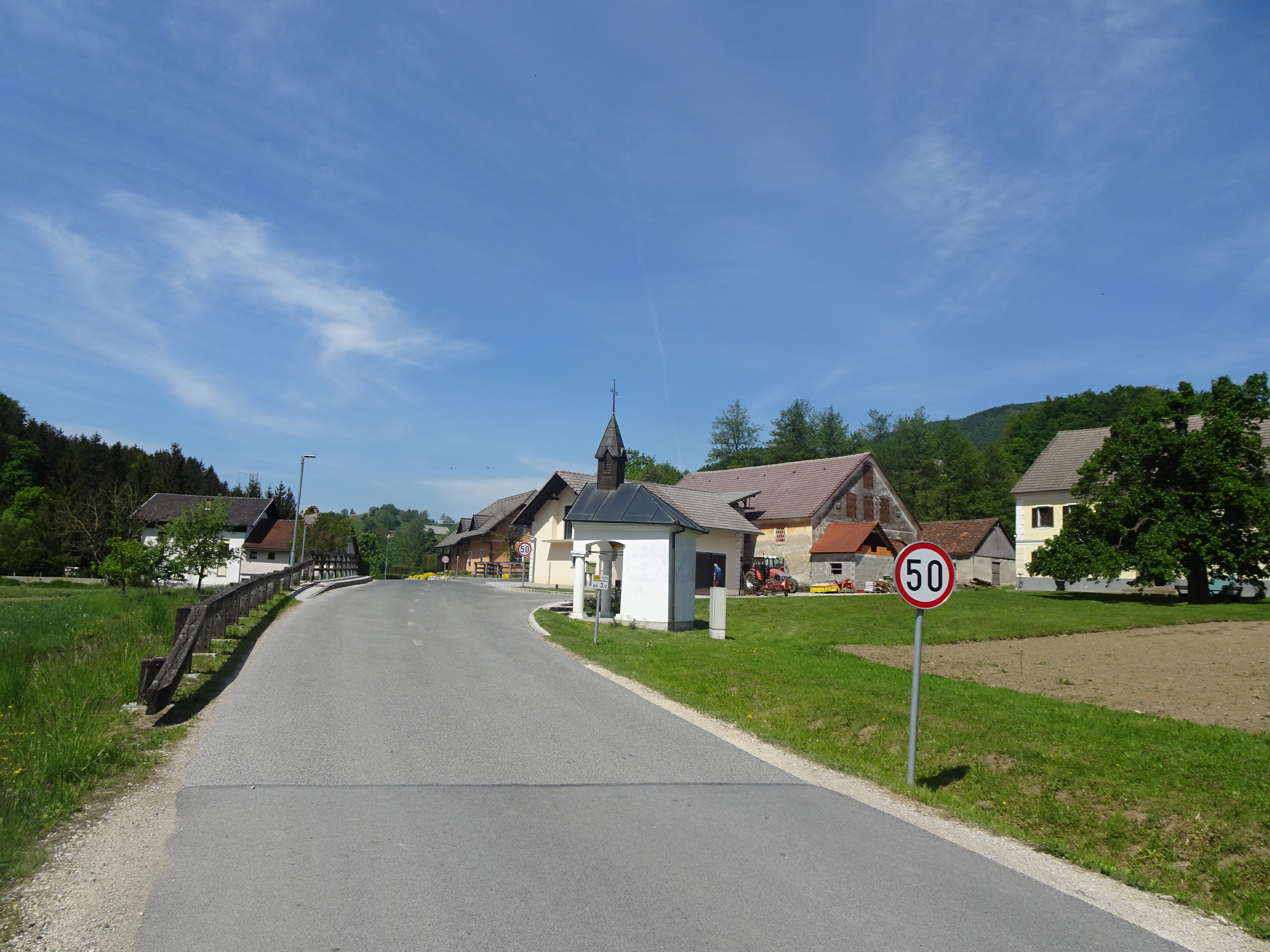

- Location in Slovenia
- Coordinates: 46°18′15.33″N 15°26′13.14″E
- Country: Slovenia
- Traditional region: Styria
- Statistical region: Savinja
- Municipality: Slovenske Konjice

Area
  - Total: 2.09 km^{2} (0.81 sq mi)
- Elevation: 336.2 m (1,103 ft)

Population (2002)
  - Total: 76

Škedenj (pronounced [ˈʃkɛːdən]) is a dispersed settlement in the Municipality of Slovenske Konjice in eastern Slovenia. It lies in the hills surrounding the valley of Žičnica Creek, also known as the Valley of Saint John the Baptist (Slovene: dolina svetega Janeza Krstnika) after the church at the Žiče Charterhouse further up the valley dedicated to John the Baptist on the left bank of the Dravinja River. The area is part of the traditional region of Styria. The municipality is now included in the Savinja Statistical Region.
