= Bizovik =

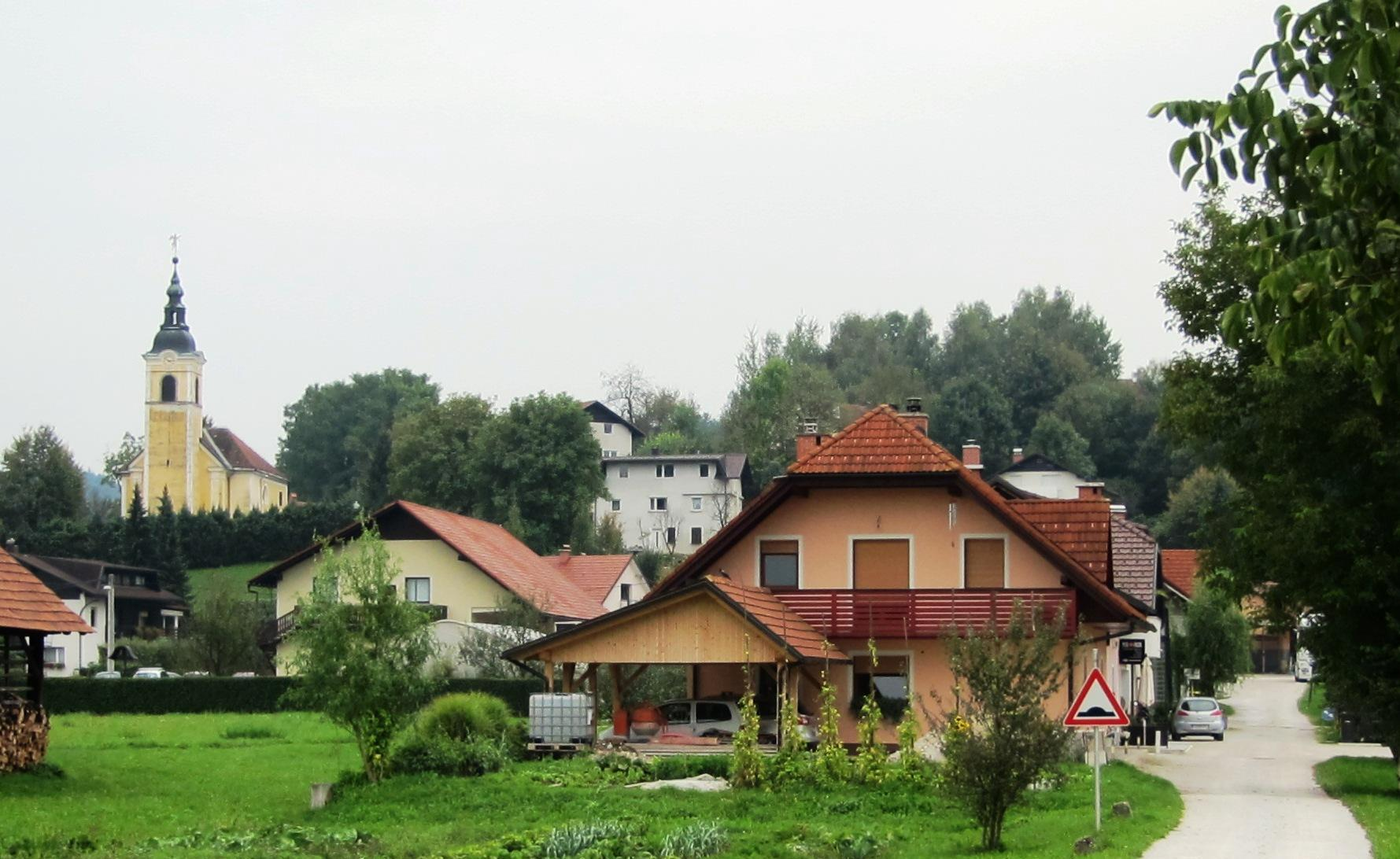
- Bizovik

- Location in Slovenia
- Coordinates: 46°2′5.19″N 14°34′10.42″E
- Country: Slovenia
- Traditional region: Lower Carniola
- Statistical region: Central Slovenia
- Municipality: Ljubljana
- Elevation: 298 m (978 ft)

Bizovik (pronounced [bizɔˈʋiːk]; in older sources also Bezovik, German: Wisowik) is a formerly independent settlement southeast of the capital Ljubljana in central Slovenia. It belongs to the City Municipality of Ljubljana. It is part of the traditional region of Lower Carniola and is now included with the rest of the municipality in the Central Slovenia Statistical Region. Parts of the settlement include V Dolini along the road toward Orle, Zgornji Konec or Nazaret around the church to the northwest, Pod Kopalom from the church down to the valley, and Na Vasi in the north.

== Name ==
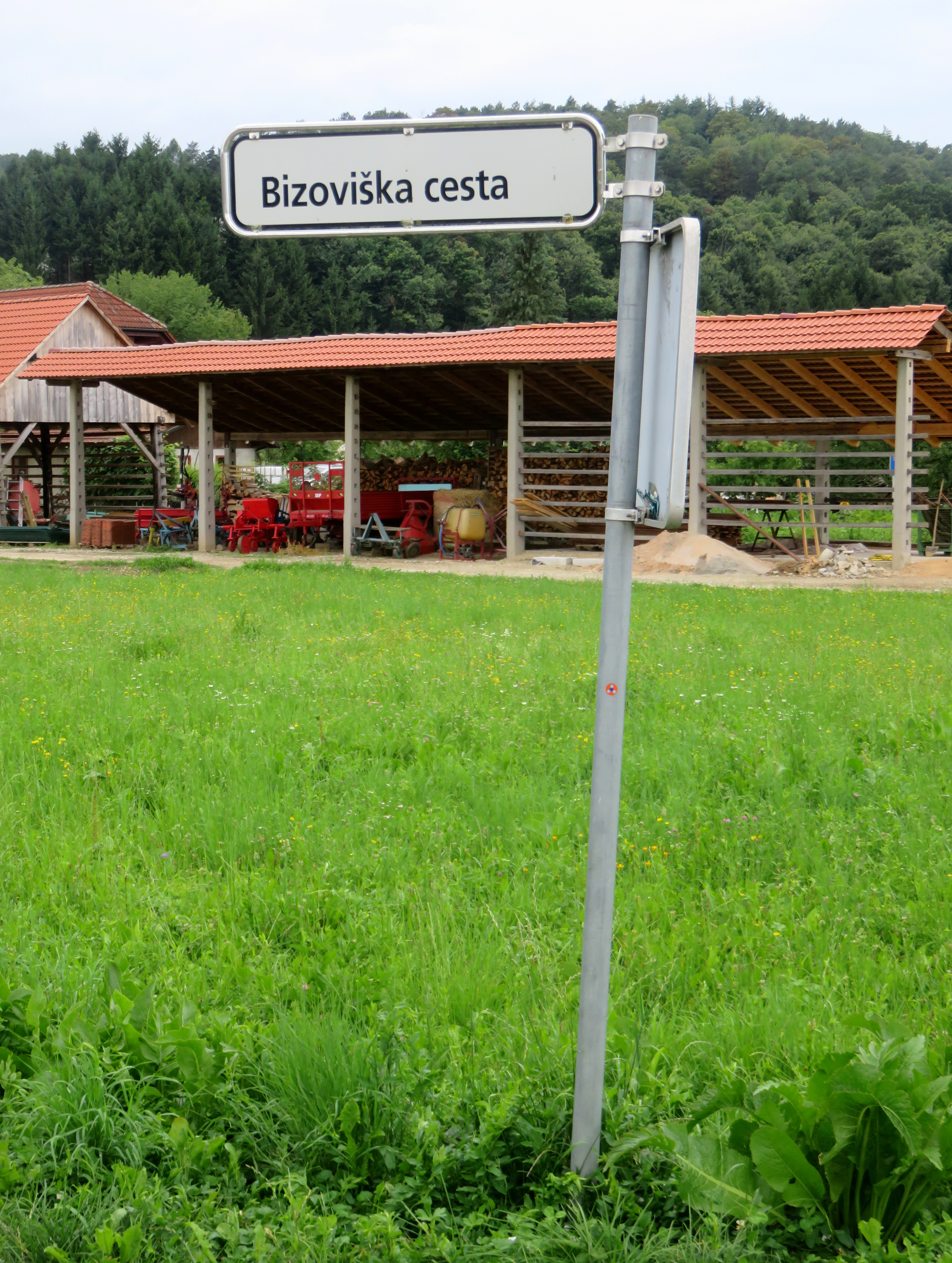
A sign for Bizovik Street (Bizoviška cesta) in Bizovik

Bizovik was attested in written sources in 1252 as Holern (and as Holaren in 1408 and Holler süpp. in 1490). The Slovene name is derived from the Slovene common noun *bъzovikъ 'elder grove' (from the noun *bъzъ 'elder'). This is confirmed by the Middle High German attestations of the name, which contain the root holler or holder 'elder'.

== History ==
Until the Second World War, Bizovik was known for its washerwomen. They washed clothing for much of Ljubljana in Long Creek (Slovene: Dolgi potok). This activity died out after the Second World War.

=== Second World War ===
In 1942 two men from Bizovik (Franc Jakoš and Janez Pavčič) and three from Dobrunje (Milko Cankar, Franc Jakoš Sr., and Franc Jakoš Jr.) were abducted and killed by the Partisans. They were referred to in extensive press coverage as the "Bizovik victims" (Slovene: bizoviške žrtve) and the "Dobrunje victims" (Slovene: dobrunjske žrtve). Their bodies were discovered on 20 March 1943 and they were buried at the Bizovik and Dobrunje cemeteries in ceremonies attended by several thousand people.

=== Annexation ===
Bizovik was annexed by the city of Ljubljana in 1982, ending its existence as an independent settlement.

== Church ==
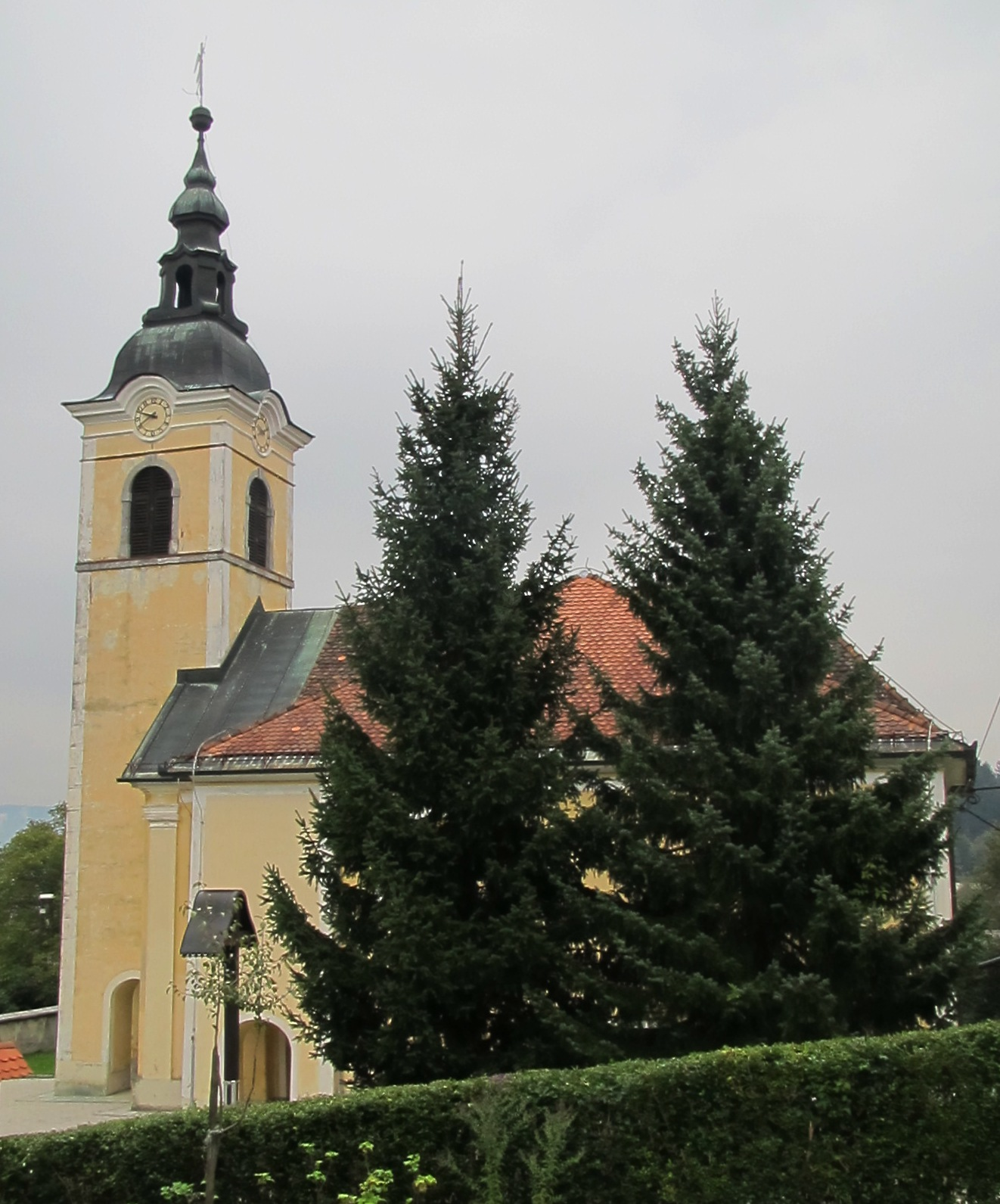
Saint Nicholas' Church

The church in Bizovik is dedicated to Saint Nicholas. It was first mentioned in written sources in 1526 as a chapel of ease associated with St. Peter's Church. It has been completely remodeled in the Baroque style and has two side chapels. The painting are reminiscent of Anton Cebej and the main altar dates from 1857. It is a wooden Baroque altar created by Peter Sever from Ljubljana. The side altars were created by Fran Zajc in 1873; the right one is dedicated to Saint Joseph, and the left to Our Lady of Sorrows. The Stations of the Cross date from 1895. The church was a pilgrimage site for people from the Trnovec and Krakovo neighborhoods of Ljubljana, who would invoke the protection of Saint Nicholas as the patron of fishermen and boatmen.

Inside the church, above the altar column to the right, is a figure of Saint Florian holding piggin of water over the church; the church is depicted with the bell tower to the right side instead of at the front, where the new bell tower was built after the old bell tower was torn down in 1825. The bell tower contains three bells. There were four bells before the First World War, but three of them were taken away and melted down for cannons. After the war, two steel bells were cast and hung next to the remaining bronze bell, which was cast by Nikolaj Urban Boset in 1688 and weighs 245 kilograms (540 lb).

There is a former cemetery around the church; it fell out of use when the new cemetery was opened in 1931. A plaque in a niche at the church is dedicated to the fallen of the First World War. It bears the date 13 September 1925 and contains the names of 34 soldiers. A monument next to the church is dedicated to the non-communist dead of the Second World War, both military and civilians killed by the Partisans. It bears the date 3 July 1994 and contains the names of 43 soldiers and 13 civilians.

There is a chapel-shrine next to the church with a statue of the Virgin Mary. Before the Second World War, the statue stood in a shrine in the village. However, the shrine was destroyed after the war and the statue was thrown into Bizovik Creek, where it was considerably damaged. The statue was retrieved and hidden by local people. After the fall of communism, a new shrine was built in 2004 and the statue was placed in it.
