= Kastelec =

Kastelec Castel
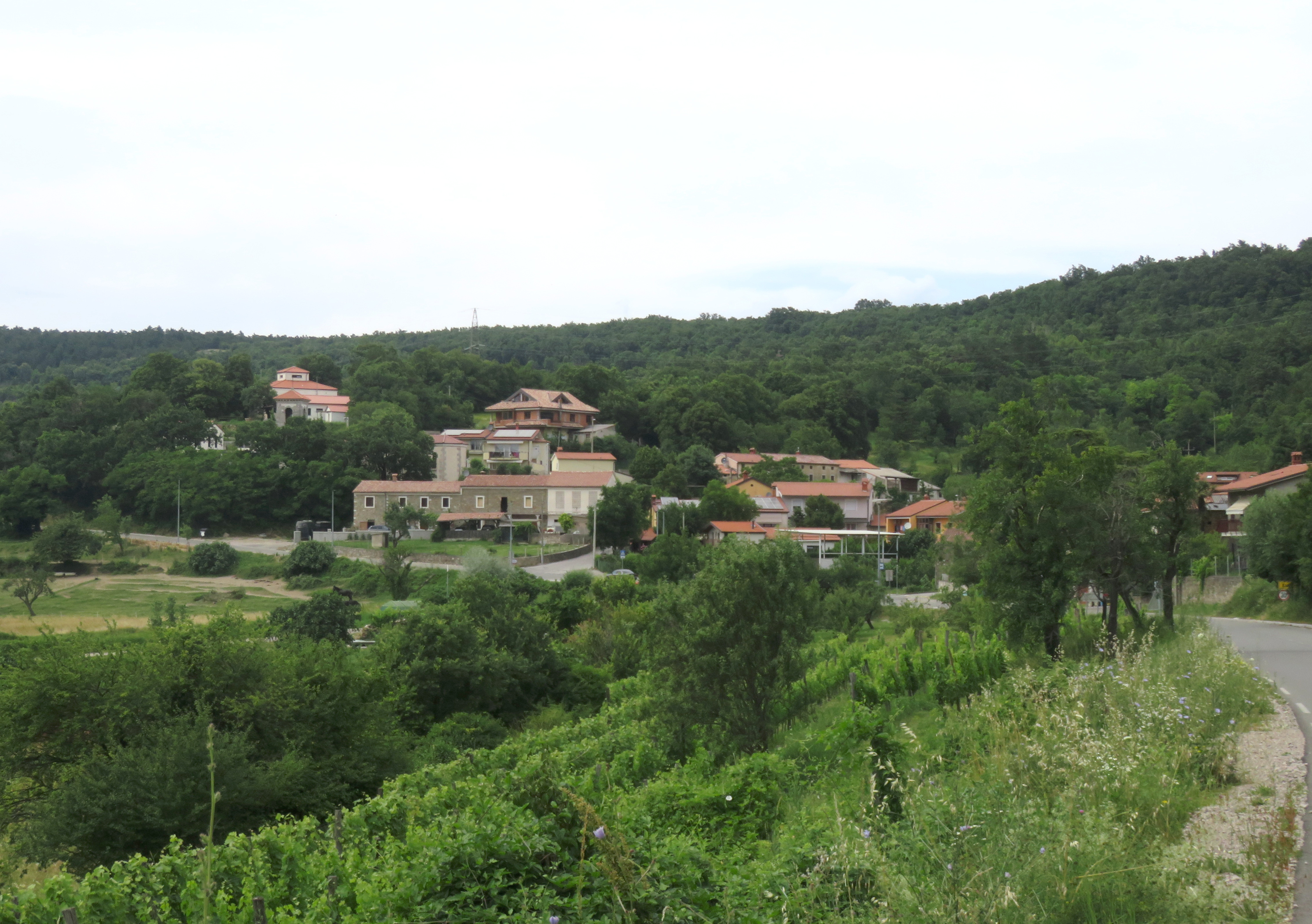

- Location in Slovenia
- Coordinates: 45°34′52.83″N 13°52′18″E
- Country: Slovenia
- Traditional region: Littoral
- Statistical region: Coastal–Karst
- Municipality: Koper

Area
  - Total: 3.75 km^{2} (1.45 sq mi)
- Elevation: 317.3 m (1,041 ft)

Population (2002)
  - Total: 46

Kastelec (pronounced [kaˈsteːləts], Italian: Castel) is a settlement in the City Municipality of Koper in the Littoral region of Slovenia.

The local church is dedicated to the Exaltation of the Holy Cross and belongs to the Parish of Klanec.
