= Petrol Group =

Slovenia-based oil company

- Company type: public company
- Traded as: LJSE: PETG
- Industry: Oil and gas industry
- Founded: April 1947
- Headquarters: Ljubljana, Slovenia
- Area served: Slovenia, Croatia, Bosnia and Herzegovina, Montenegro, Serbia
- Products: petrol products
- Services: service stations
- Revenue: ▼EUR 6.14 billion (2025)
- Operating income: ▲EUR 224.4 million (2025)
- Net income: ▲EUR 174.2 million (2025)
- Total assets: ▼EUR 2.42 billion (2025)
- Total equity: ▲EUR 1.044 billion (2024)
- Number of employees: 5,893 (2025)
- Website: www.petrol.eu

Petrol Group is a Slovenian oil distributing company, which is one of the largest in Slovenia and the former Yugoslavia and controls 598 petrol stations, of which there are:

- 318 in Slovenia,
- 203 in Croatia,
- 42 in Bosnia and Herzegovina,
- 21 in Serbia,
- 15 in Montenegro.

== History ==
The company was established in April 1947 as Jugopetrol, in the city of Ljubljana, and renamed Petrol in 1953.

In 1974, trading in natural gas began. In 1996, the company was transformed into a joint-stock company under the name Petrol, Slovenska naftna družba, d.d. Ljubljana, and a year later the shares were listed on the Ljubljana Stock Exchange. In 1996, internationalization also began with the establishment of a subsidiary in Croatia, where the first service stations were built in 1999. The first stations in Bosnia and Herzegovina followed a year later, and in Serbia in 2003.

In 2010, the Petrol Group acquired Croatian gas company Jadranplin, which focuses on gas storage and selling of liquefied petroleum gas.
