= Dragučova =

- Location in Slovenia
- Coordinates: 46°34′35.2″N 15°42′8.86″E
- Country: Slovenia
- Traditional region: Styria
- Statistical region: Drava
- Municipality: Pesnica

Area
  - Total: 4.37 km^{2} (1.69 sq mi)
- Elevation: 366.8 m (1,203 ft)

Population (2002)
  - Total: 264

Dragučova (pronounced [dɾaɡuˈtʃɔːʋa] or [dɾaɡuˈtʃoːʋa]) is a settlement in the Municipality of Pesnica in northeastern Slovenia. It lies in the hills northeast of Maribor on the edge of the Pesnica Valley. The area is part of the traditional region of Styria. It is now included in the Drava Statistical Region.
