= Blagovica =

- Village
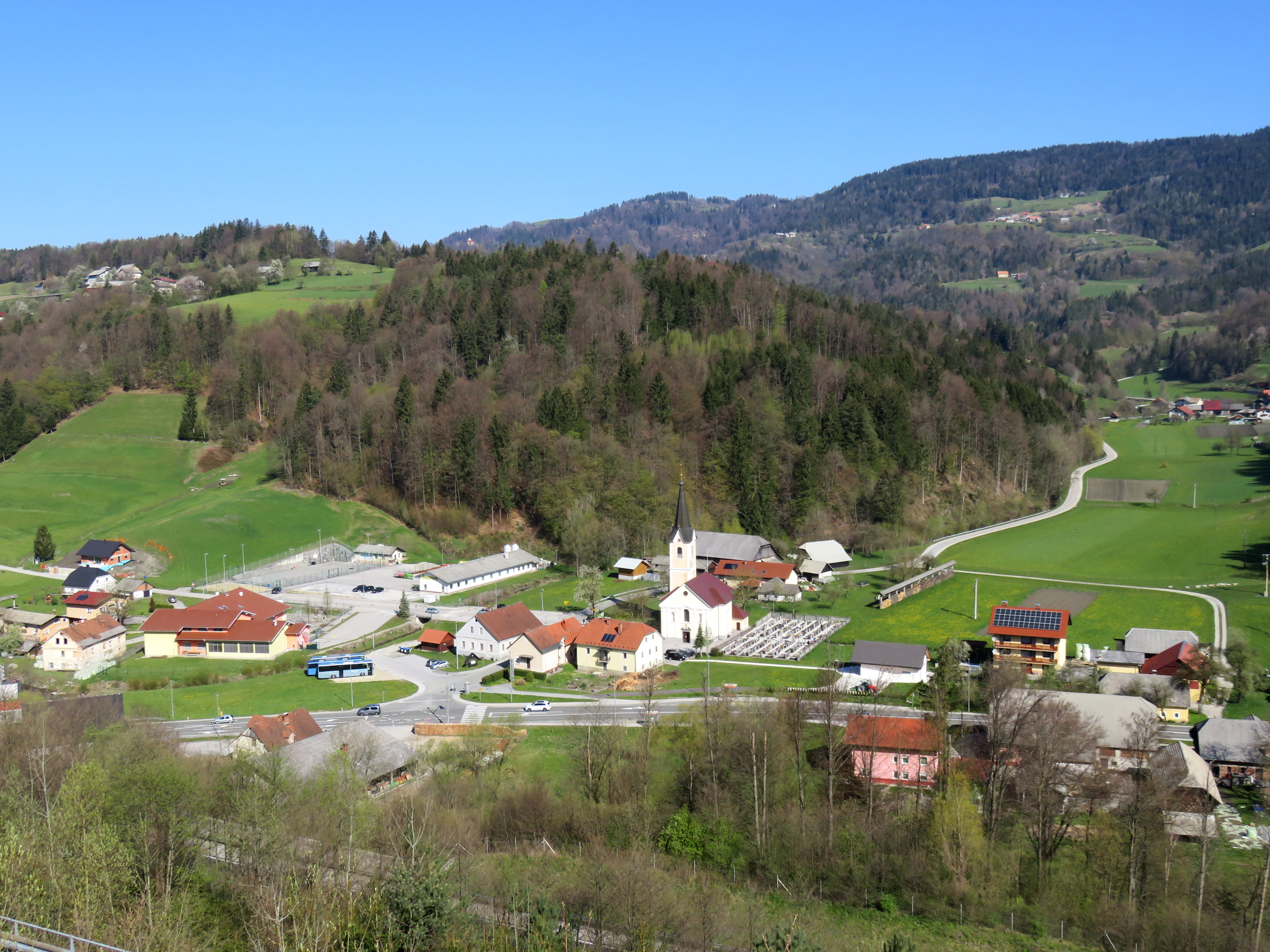

- Location in Slovenia
- Coordinates: 46°10′32.97″N 14°48′14.08″E
- Country: Slovenia
- Traditional region: Upper Carniola
- Statistical region: Central Slovenia
- Municipality: Lukovica

Area
  - Total: 0.92 km^{2} (0.36 sq mi)
- Elevation: 410.2 m (1,346 ft)

Population (2002)
  - Total: 101
- Post code: 1223
- Area code: 01

Blagovica (pronounced [blaˈɡoːʋitsa]; German: Glogowitz) is a village in the Municipality of Lukovica in the eastern part of the Upper Carniola region of Slovenia.

== Geography ==
Blagovica lies between the Radomlja River and Zlatenščica Creek and is the local center of the east-central part of the Radomlja Valley (also known as the Black Valley, Slovene: Črni graben). Blagovica has a primary school, a post office, a bar, a gas station and a parish church. The village also has several organizations, including the Blagovica Volunteer Fire Department, the Blagovica Hiking Club, the Blagovica Cultural Society, the Blagovica Rural Youth Organisation, and the Trojane–Blagovica Rural Women's Society.

== Name ==
Blagovica was attested in written sources as Glogowicz in 1327, Glouiz in 1328, and Ober Glogowicz in 1369, among other spellings.

== History ==
Blagovica is the seat of the Blagovica Local Community, which was an independent municipality until 1959 but then became a part of the Municipality of Domžale. Since 1995 the community has been part of the Municipality of Lukovica.

== Church ==
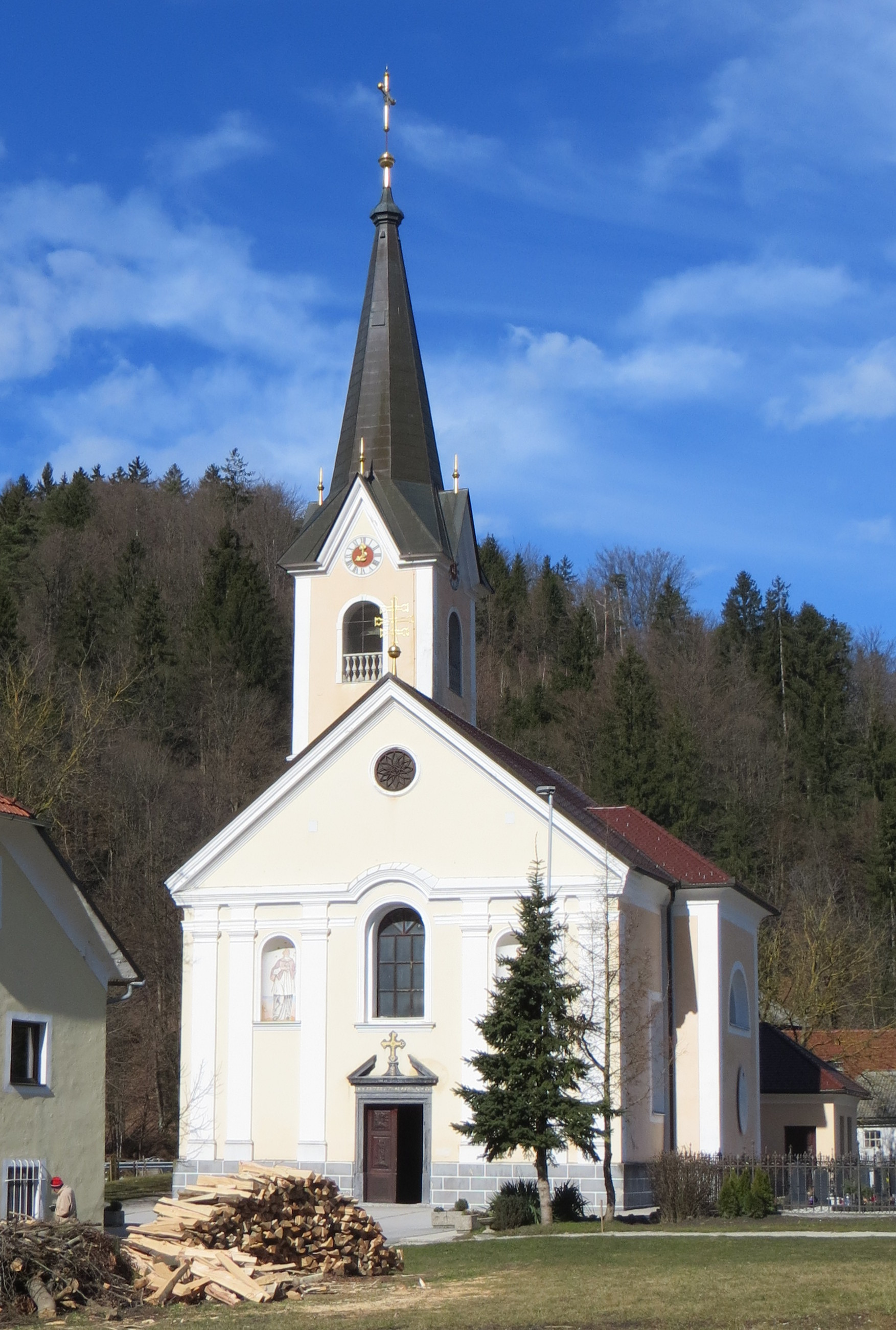
View from the south

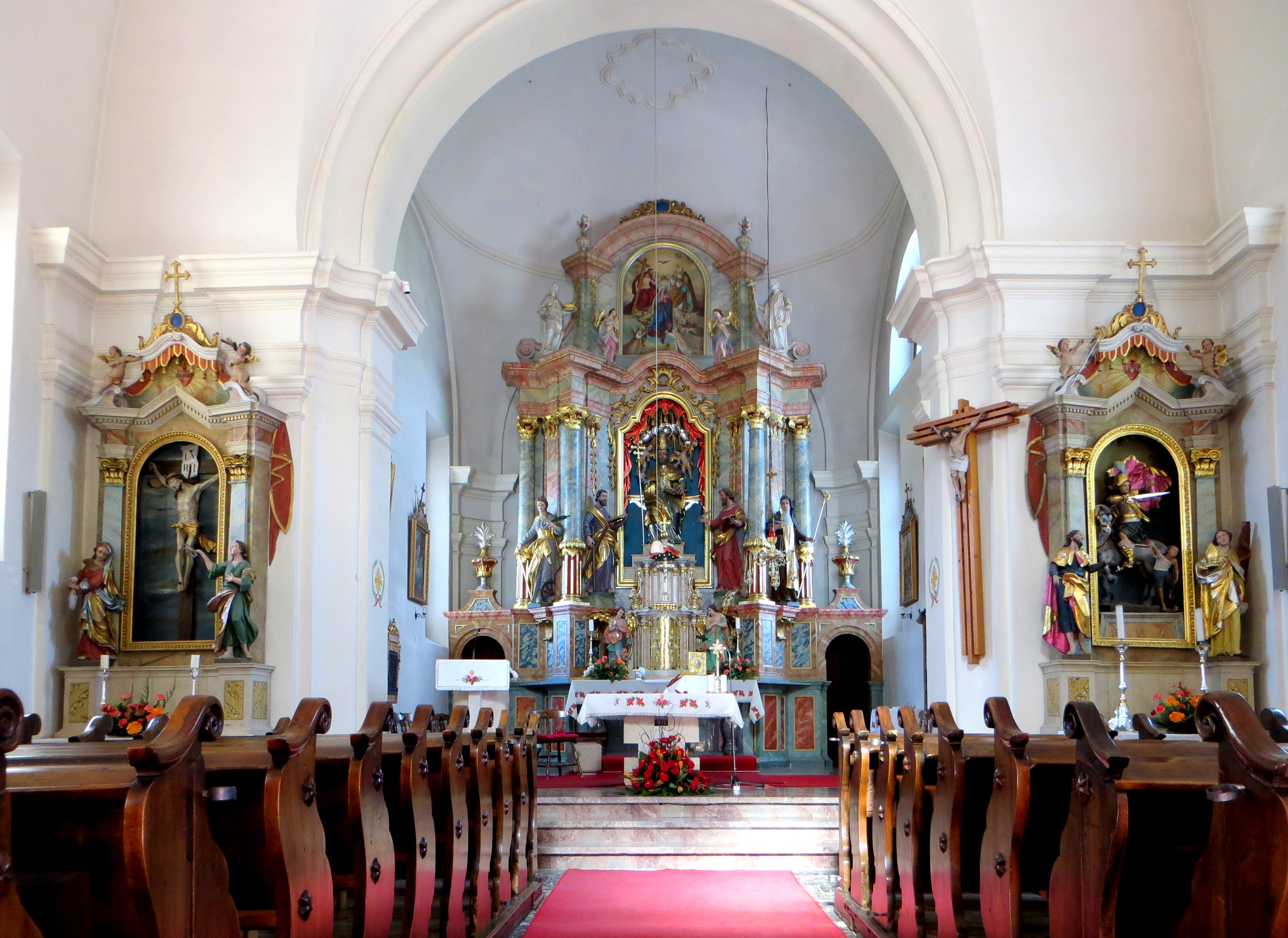
Interior

Saint Peter's Church

Blagovica is also the seat of the Parish of Blagovica. The parish church in the settlement is dedicated to Saint Peter.
