= Srednja Vas (Lavrica) =

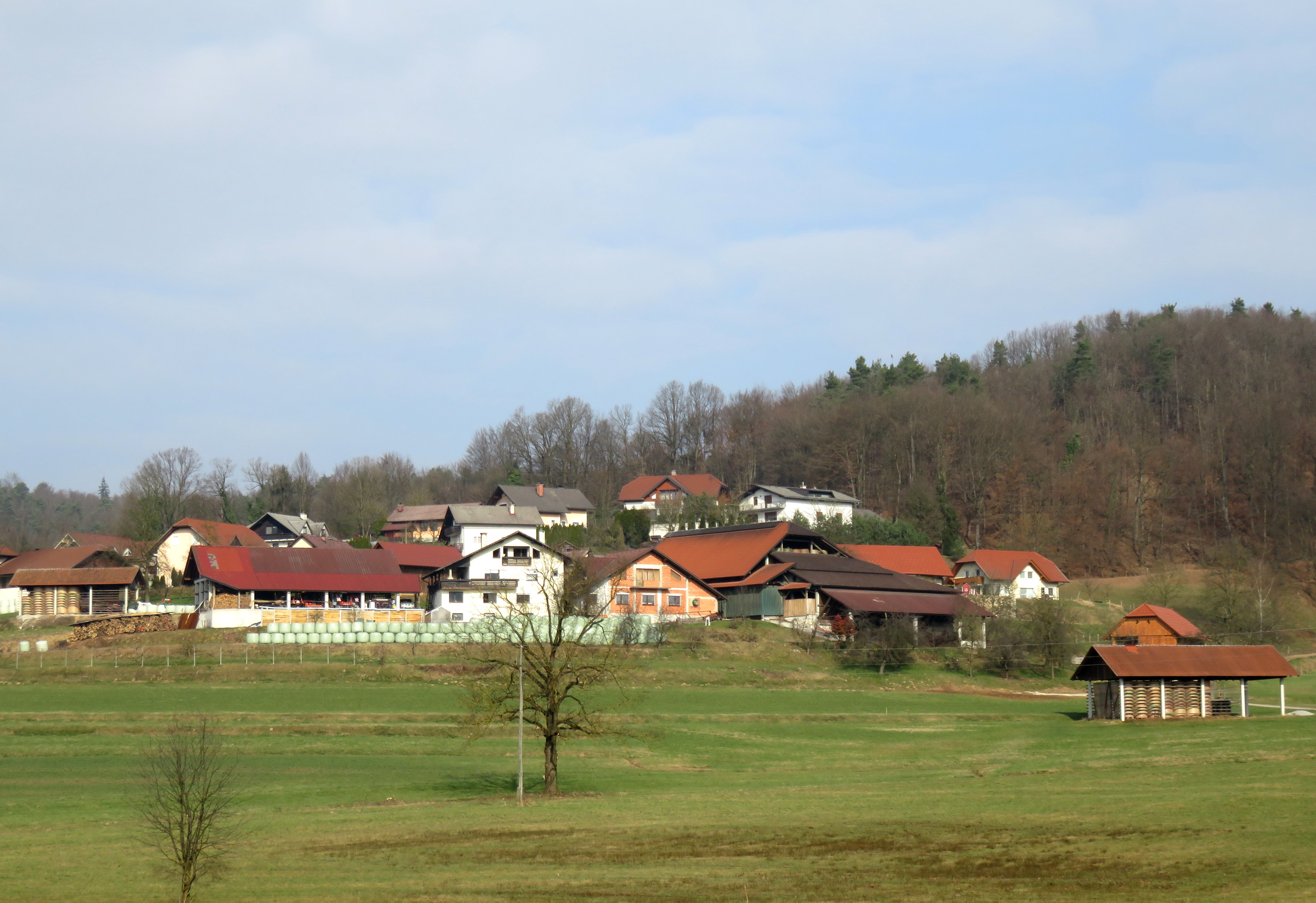

- Location in Slovenia
- Coordinates: 46°00′12″N 14°33′46″E
- Country: Slovenia
- Traditional region: Lower Carniola
- Statistical region: Central Slovenia
- Municipality: Škofljica
- Elevation: 330 m (1,080 ft)

Srednja Vas (pronounced [ˈsɾeːdnja ˈʋaːs], Slovene: Srednja vas, German: Srednawaß) is a former village in central Slovenia in the Municipality of Škofljica. It is now part of the village of Lavrica. It is part of the traditional region of Lower Carniola and is now included in the Central Slovenia Statistical Region.

== Geography ==
Srednja Vas is a clustered settlement below Hrastovec Hill (elevation: 407 meters or 1,335 feet), a foothill of Golovec Hill. It is connected by road to Daljna Vas to the west, Orle to the northeast, and Sela pri Rudniku to the east. The Grivka embayment of the Ljubljana Marsh, with fields, meadows, and Grivka Creek, lies south of the settlement. To the north the land is forested, especially with chestnut trees, and the woods contain blueberries and mushrooms that the locals traditionally gathered to sell.

== Name ==
The name Srednja vas literally means 'middle village'. Srednja vas and names like it (e.g., Srednje) indicate that the settlement lay in some sort of central or middle position between two larger settlements. In this case, the settlement lies in an intermediate position between Daljna Vas and Zadnja Vas (a hamlet of Lavrica further to the east). The name is unrelated to names derived from sreda 'Wednesday' (e.g., Središče ob Dravi).

== History ==
Part of Srednja Vas was annexed by Lavrica in 1961, when the name Lavrica was applied to a merged settlement consisting of Daljna Vas and parts of Babna Gorica, Srednja Vas, Škofljica, and Ljubljana. The remainder of Srednja Vas was annexed by Lavrica in 1983, ending its existence as a separate settlement.
