= Sela pri Rudniku =

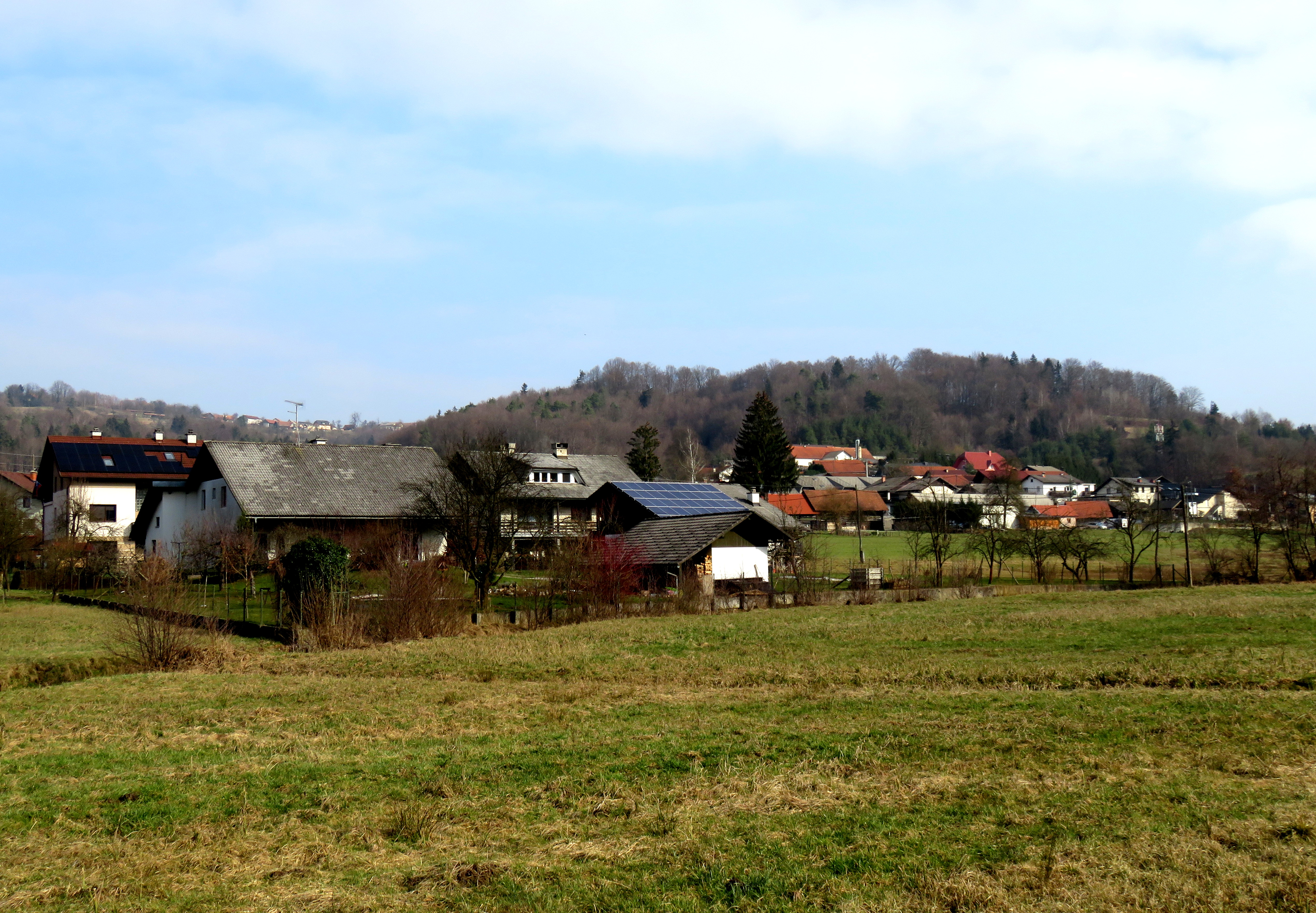

- Location in Slovenia
- Coordinates: 46°00′09″N 14°34′20″E
- Country: Slovenia
- Traditional region: Lower Carniola
- Statistical region: Central Slovenia
- Municipality: Škofljica
- Elevation: 330 m (1,080 ft)

Sela pri Rudniku (pronounced [ˈseːla pɾi ˈɾuːdniku], German: Sela bei Rudnik) is a former village in central Slovenia in the Municipality of Škofljica. It is now part of the village of Lavrica. It is part of the traditional region of Lower Carniola and is now included in the Central Slovenia Statistical Region.

== Geography ==
Sela pri Rudniku is a clustered settlement below Orle at the end of an embayment in the Ljubljana Marsh. It is connected to Lavrica by a road that runs along the northwest base of Smrečje Hill (elevation: 384 meters or 1,260 feet) and continues to Orle and Podmolnik. Molnik Hill (elevation: 582 meters or 1,909 feet) rises to the east. Grivka Creek rises in the hills northeast of Sela pri Rudniku and then flows south of the settlement before emptying into Prošca Creek in the marsh. The Lisičje Woods and Lisičje Manor stand to the south.

== Name ==
Sela pri Rudniku was known as Čemšenik in the past; this name encompassed a broader settlement area near Lavrica that also included the former villages of Daljna Vas and Srednja Vas. It was attested in historical sources as Czremssenich in 1330, Schremsnigk in 1421–1422, and Tschremsenikg in 1496. The name Čemšenik is derived from the common noun čremsa 'bird cherry', referring to the local vegetation. The modern name of the settlement, Sela pri Rudniku, means 'Sela near Rudnik'. The toponym Sela is common in Slovenia; it is a plural form derived from the Slovene common noun selo 'village, settlement'.

== History ==
Black coal was mined east of the village until just after the First World War. Sela pri Rudniku was annexed by the village of Lavrica in 1983, ending its existence as an independent settlement.
