= Zgornja Hrušica =

- Location in Slovenia
- Coordinates: 46°2′39.55″N 14°32′56.06″E
- Country: Slovenia
- Traditional region: Lower Carniola
- Statistical region: Central Slovenia
- Municipality: Ljubljana
- Elevation: 290 m (950 ft)

Zgornja Hrušica (pronounced [ˈzɡoːɾnja ˈxɾuːʃitsa]; in older sources also Gorenja Hrušica, German: Oberbirnbaum) is a formerly independent settlement southeast of the capital Ljubljana in central Slovenia. It belongs to the City Municipality of Ljubljana. It is part of the traditional region of Lower Carniola and is now included with the rest of the municipality in the Central Slovenia Statistical Region.

== Geography ==
Zgornja Hrušica is an elongated settlement with an old village core on the north slope of Golovec Hill, from which it extends northwards to the Ljubljanica River. It is separated from Štepanja Vas to the west by Long Creek (Slovene: Dolgi potok) and from Spodnja Hrušica to the east by Graben Creek. Both creeks flow from Golovec Hill into the Ljubljanica. The soil below Golovec Hill is loamy, becoming sandy to the north near Litija Street (Slovene: Litijska cesta).

== Name ==
Together with neighboring Spodnja Hrušica (literally, 'lower Hrušica'), Zgornja Hrušica (literally, 'upper Hrušica') was attested in written records in 1243 as Pirpovm and Pyrpowm (and as Pirpavmein in 1251, Pirpoum in 1253, and in der Grusnitz in 1491). The Slovene name is derived from the common noun *hruša 'pear'. The medieval attestations contain the Middle High German roots pir(e) 'pear' and boum 'tree'. In the past the German name was Oberbirnbaum (literally, 'upper pear tree').

== History ==
Until the Second World War, many washerwomen were active in Zgornja Hrušica; they washed clothing in Long Creek. This activity died out after the war. On 2 September 1942, two communist activists, Lojze Kefer Sr. and Jr., were shot and killed at house no. 22 (or 52) in Zgornja Hrušica; a memorial to the two men was installed at the site in 1982. After the Second World War, many houses were built along Long Creek. Private agriculture also ceased because much of the arable land was occupied by the Rast company, which raised garden plants, orchard trees, and flowers. Near the Ljubljanica, the former Totre factory was active; it produced shoelaces, plastic pipes, and other items. Zgornja Hrušica was annexed by the city of Ljubljana in 1982, ending its existence as an independent settlement.
