= Golovec =

Hill in Slovenia

Coordinates: 46°01′47″N 14°33′19″E

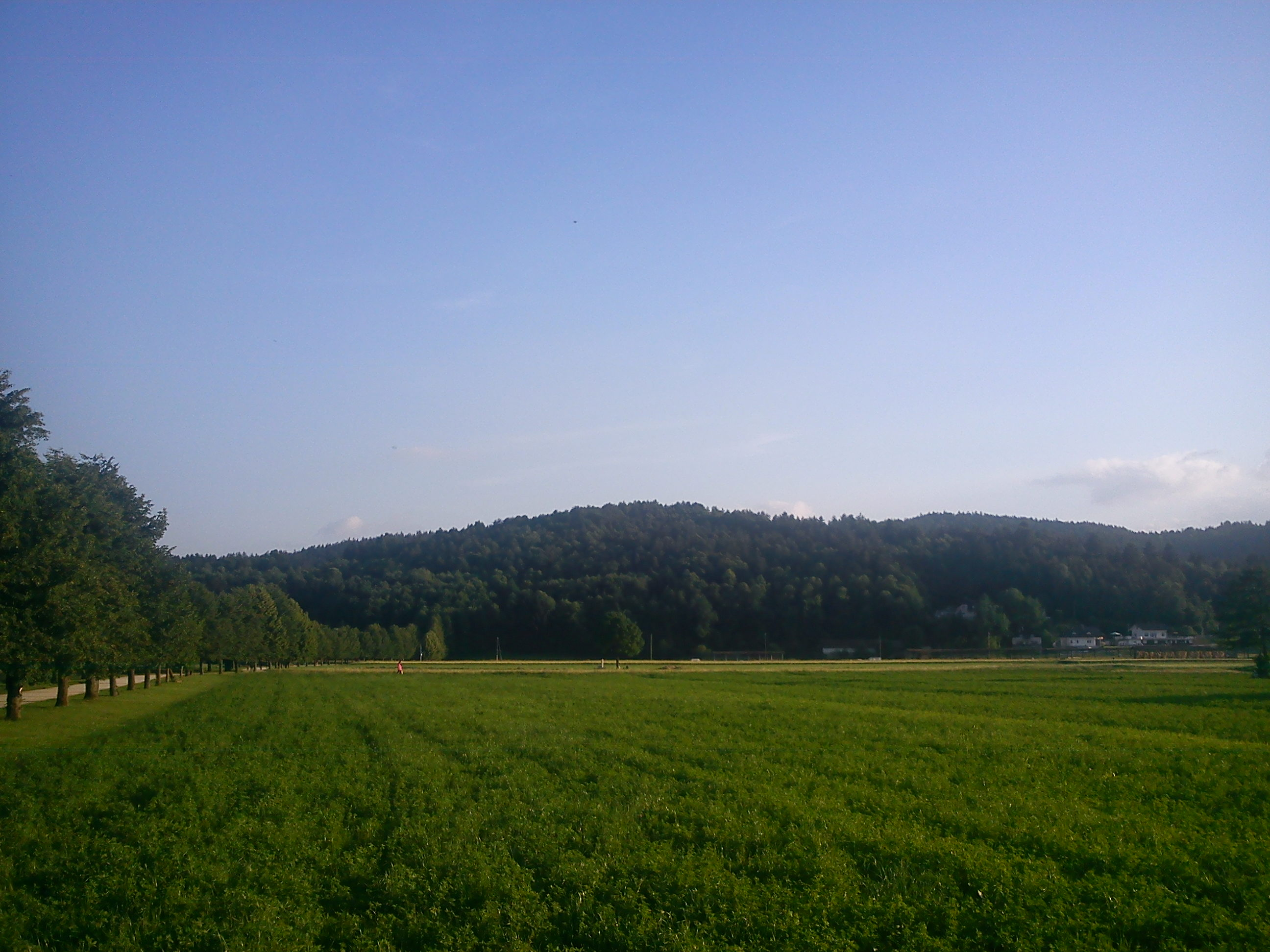
- Golovec as seen from the Trail of Remembrance and Comradeship

Highest point
- Peak: Mazovnik, Slovenia, Ljubljana
- Elevation: 450 m (1,480 ft)

Geography
- Location within Slovenia

Golovec is a forested hill southeast of the center of Ljubljana, Slovenia. Its highest peak is Mazovnik (450 m); other peaks include the slightly lower Črni hrib (440/442 m), Luknje (431/438 m), Golovec (413 m), Zeleni hrib (354 m), Hruševski hrib (408 m), and Bizoviški hrib (363 m).

Golovec represents a continuation of Rožnik and Grajski grič, and is an integral part of the Lithic anticline or Sava Hills, which continues in the ridge to the east with the village of Orle or Hrastovec (408 m) south of it, Molnik (582 m) and Pugled (615 m), while further north lie Dobrunjski hrib (429 m), Breznik (384 m) and Sveti Urh (342 m) and Zadvorski hrib (401 m) and in the valley the smaller but relatively steep hill Marenček (415 m).

Golovec covers 650 hectares, of which 635 (or 675) are covered by forest (red pine and spruce, with beech in the central part), which stretches from Gruber Canal to the city, marked by the motorway ring around Ljubljana. It is protected as a special purpose forest area. It is considered a recreational and walking area for the people of Ljubljana - the Golovec City Forest, but it has not been declared a landscape park. In the flat part of the Ljubljana polje, there are few forests due to urbanization and agriculture.

The Ljubljana Golovec District is named after the hill. The two-tube, three-lane highway Tunnel Golovec, opened in 1999, runs through it.

Golovec is home to the Golovec Astronomical and Geophysical Observatory (AGO), which was expanded in 1959.

== Geological and geographical features ==
The parent rock of Golovec consists of sandstone, shale and marl, and very little limestone (5%). On this basis, brown soils have developed, which are strongly acidic (pH of between 4 and 5), which is influenced not only by the substrate but also by the decomposition of conifers.

Several brooks originate on it. The largest, the Bizoviški and Dolgi potok, flow into the Ljubljanica. On Rakovnik there are the Veliki bajer and Mali bajer.

Golovec, together with Rožnik, forms the Ljubljana Gate. Together with the Castle Hill (both part of the Sava Hills) and the Polhov Gradec Hills, it divides the vast plain into the Ljubljana polje and the Ljubljana Marsh.

Crosswinds from Golovec, which occur especially at night, are directed towards lower elevations and are important for the renewal of air in the city.

== Water supply and sewage ==
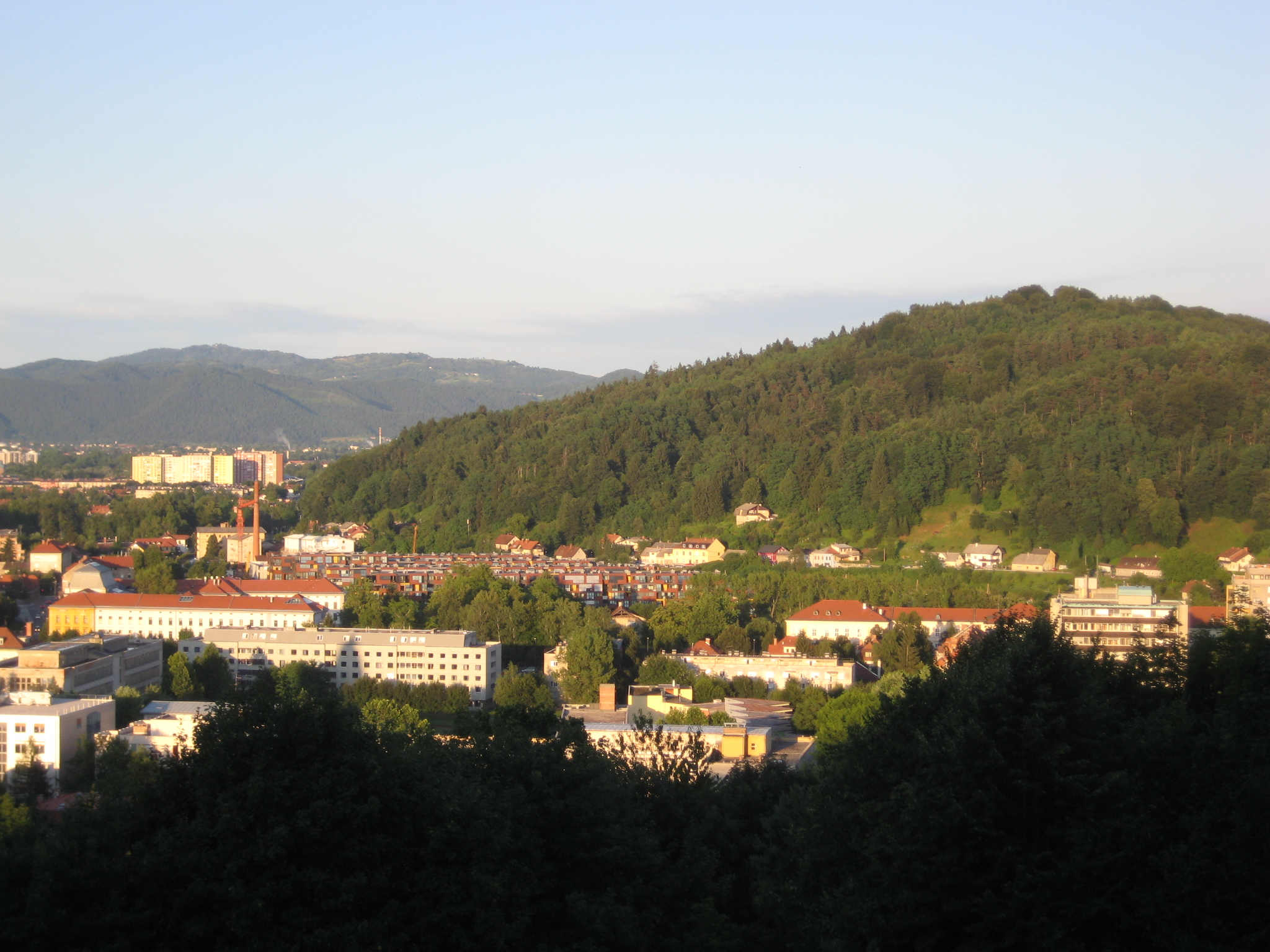
The western part of Golovec (view from Ljubljana Castle).

In the 3rd century AD, an aqueduct was laid from Golovec, supplying the suburb of Emona at the foot of the Castle Hill. In 2013, JP Vodovod-Kanalizacija renovated the aqueduct and sewerage system along the Trail of Remembrance and Comradeship.

== Military history and military features ==
The French army fortified the Castle Hill and Golovec in 1808. In a letter from December of that year, Sigmund Zois reported that the area was full of bastions, redoubts, artillery batteries and storerooms. In 1813, the Austrians, while attacking the French from Golovec, are said to have fired on Ljubljana Castle and knocked down the whistle tower, which stood at the extreme southern corner of the bastion below the palace. According to other, equally plausible explanations, it was knocked down by the French during the occupation of the castle or during its conversion into a barracks and military hospital. During World War II, in February 1942, barbed wire was also laid across Golovec, which is commemorated by the Trail of Remembrance and Comradeship.

Golovec is a Category IV land, impassable to armour and allows the movement of armoured units only via existing communications.

In the beech and alder forest, camouflage conditions are favorable from April to November, but otherwise visibility and observation possibilities are partially increased, and thus the possibility of controlling the area from the air and the ground. Vehicle movements are prohibited outside the existing routes. The distances between the crowns are not greater than their diameters, in some places they intertwine. In a multilayer forest, the crowns form two or more height layers, which makes visibility and passage difficult, including for infantry. In a single-layer forest, the tree crowns are of the same height. Camouflage conditions are worse than in a multilayer forest, but the conditions for passage and visibility are better.

=== Animals ===
Golovec was one of the hunting grounds for jays, crows, jackdaws, ravens, magpies and goshawks, which died out after 1941. During the Congress of Laibach in 1821 in Ljubljana, Emperor Francis I went to Golovec to hunt birds. In 1925, the Ljubljana city hunting ground included a significant part of Golovec.

The capercaillie population became extinct at the beginning of the 20th century, while the hazel grouse survived until the end of the 20th century. The sparrowhawk also breeds on Golovec, where there has already been an invasion by the red crossbill.

Animals have always lived on Golovec, and the area attracts them because their habitat outside the cities is shrinking, while there is plenty of food in the cities. Their access is not restricted by the Ljubljana Ring Road, as, for example, the Tunnel Golovec at the Malence junction is quite wide. In 2007, bears were observed on Golovec, which very rarely enter the forests inside the ring road. In 2008, around 30 wild boars lived permanently on Golovec (seven leading sows with 15 cubs and at least one group of wild boars, animals in their second year of life), which is a large number considering the recreational activities and the surrounding population. According to hunters, this species, along with carrion crows and jays, is a problem because it causes damage and accidents. According to a 2004 decree, hunting was not allowed within the ring road. Today, shooting is permitted on Golovec only to a certain extent and under special conditions, namely wild boar due to damage, roe deer due to being run over, and foxes due to intrusions into chicken coops. Golovec is also home to badgers.

=== Vegetation ===
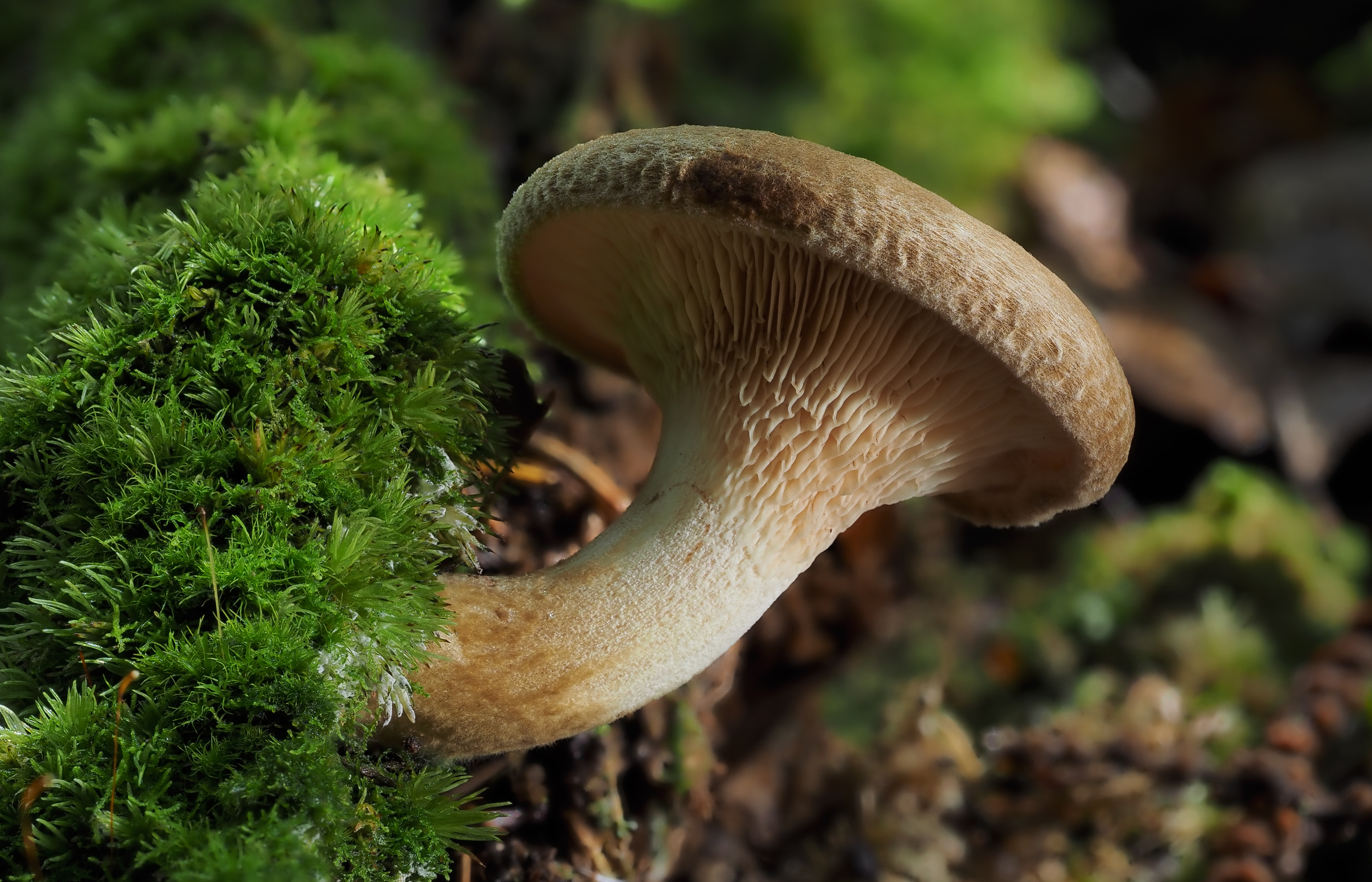
A Paxillus involutus on Golovec.

Golovec is one of the so-called green wedges of Ljubljana, which are the basic building blocks of the green system and bearers of a whole range of ecological, social and aesthetic functions in the city. Its forests protect drinking water, protect against floods by retaining water and reduce soil erosion on steep slopes.

On the slope near the settlement of Bizovik, along the Bizovik stream, a red pine and blueberry association dominates (red pine, Norway spruce, sweet chestnut, sessile oak, silver birch), a mixed forest of mostly medium growth (diameter of trunk: 20–30 cm, height 18–20 cm), which is dense, multi-layered on the lower slopes, but otherwise mostly single-layered.

Elsewhere, the beech and hornbeam forest (beech, sessile oak, sweet chestnut, Norway spruce, red pine, silver fir, silver birch) dominates, a mixed forest of mostly medium growth (diameter of trunk: 20–40 cm, height 18–25 cm), which is dense, multi-layered on the lower slopes, but otherwise mostly single-layered.

In the 2014 icefall, the forests in Golovec were slightly less damaged than those in Tivoli, Šišenski hrib and Castle Hill. In the part that was particularly damaged, a spectacular logging operation was carried out, opening up a view of the Ljubljana Marshes and the Mount Krim to visitors.

=== Afforestation and calls for protection ===
In the mid-19th century, Golovec was bare and uncultivated. In an area owned by the city, pottery was extracted from the sand. In 1859, the city magistrate replied to the agricultural society that afforestation might soon begin. In 1884, J. Hribar, head of the city beautification department, submitted a proposal for the greening of Golovec. Experts expected that the work could be completed within three years. At the beginning of the 20th century, a landowner carried out a tree clearing operation, and fears were expressed that Golovec would be returned to its deforested state. The illegal loggers were mostly women and children. In 1906, members of the 17th Infantry Regiment illegally uprooted young trees for plantations at the barracks. In 1920, the Slovenski narod newspaper drew attention to the poor condition of private forests on Golovec and Rožnik, which were being destroyed by illegal logging and excessive use of litter by the owners themselves. In 1938, the Slovenski narod, during the construction of new houses and the widening of the road to Golovec along Hradecka Road, warned that there was no clear limit to how far the city could expand, which could mean the slow destruction of the forest. After 1941, some forests were heavily cut down, especially in Golovec and Rožnik na Bokalcah.

In 1933, the municipal council decided to implement the principle of non-building of Golovec, the Castle Hill and Rožnik. In 1934, at the suggestion of Prof. Plečnik, the city municipality, in an agreement with the Drava Banovina's administration, protected Golovec, the Castle Hill and Rožnik from construction and unauthorized logging, with the exception of parts of the city garden, which operated according to Plečnik's instructions. In 1939, Golovec was protected from construction, except for the foothills along Hradecka Road, Dolenjska Road, the approved subdivision in Rakovnik, along the road to Orle and already built-up plots.

=== Pollution ===
In the 1980s, the problem of large numbers of illegal dumps was raised.

In 2008, a civil initiative opposed plans to build a road between Štepanja Vas and Rudnik. To oppose the road construction, they set up a website and collected signatures in opposition of the road proposal, which would run through a tunnel from the intersection of Kajuhova and Litijska Road to Rudnik.

Hikers choose to avoid crowds by choosing to go off-road, which contributes to so-called trail erosion, and the trail attracts even more people. As a result, there are many trails in Golovec that are all very close to each other. Another problem is the release of dogs, as they also like to choose untouched terrain, thus contributing to the destruction of vegetation and the destruction of the living space of animals that want peace and therefore retreat to more remote parts of the forest. The environment is therefore more degraded where people go for recreation. Compared to Rožnik and Castle Hill, Golovec appears to be less polluted due to its larger area, lower density of recreational users on each part of the hill, and greater distance from the center of Ljubljana.

When the equipment was renovated in 2021, the Ljubljana municipality expressed its wish that visitors would not perform sports activities on the new benches and tables located on the Trail of Remembrance and Comradeship and elsewhere, as they cause dirt and thus discourage people from using them.

== Land ownership and management ==
In 1858, Ljubljana tried to solve its financial problems by selling Golovec in parts. Some landowners from Poljane and Štepanja Vas complained about this. The city economist Podkrajšek refuted them with a document signed by Charles VI on 29 November 1725.

Today, 14 percent of the hill is owned by the City of Ljubljana and the state, and the rest by 450 owners and co-owners (according to other data, 361 owners and 848 co-owners). Due to the small plots and lack of connectivity, management is difficult and inefficient.

== Outdoor activities ==
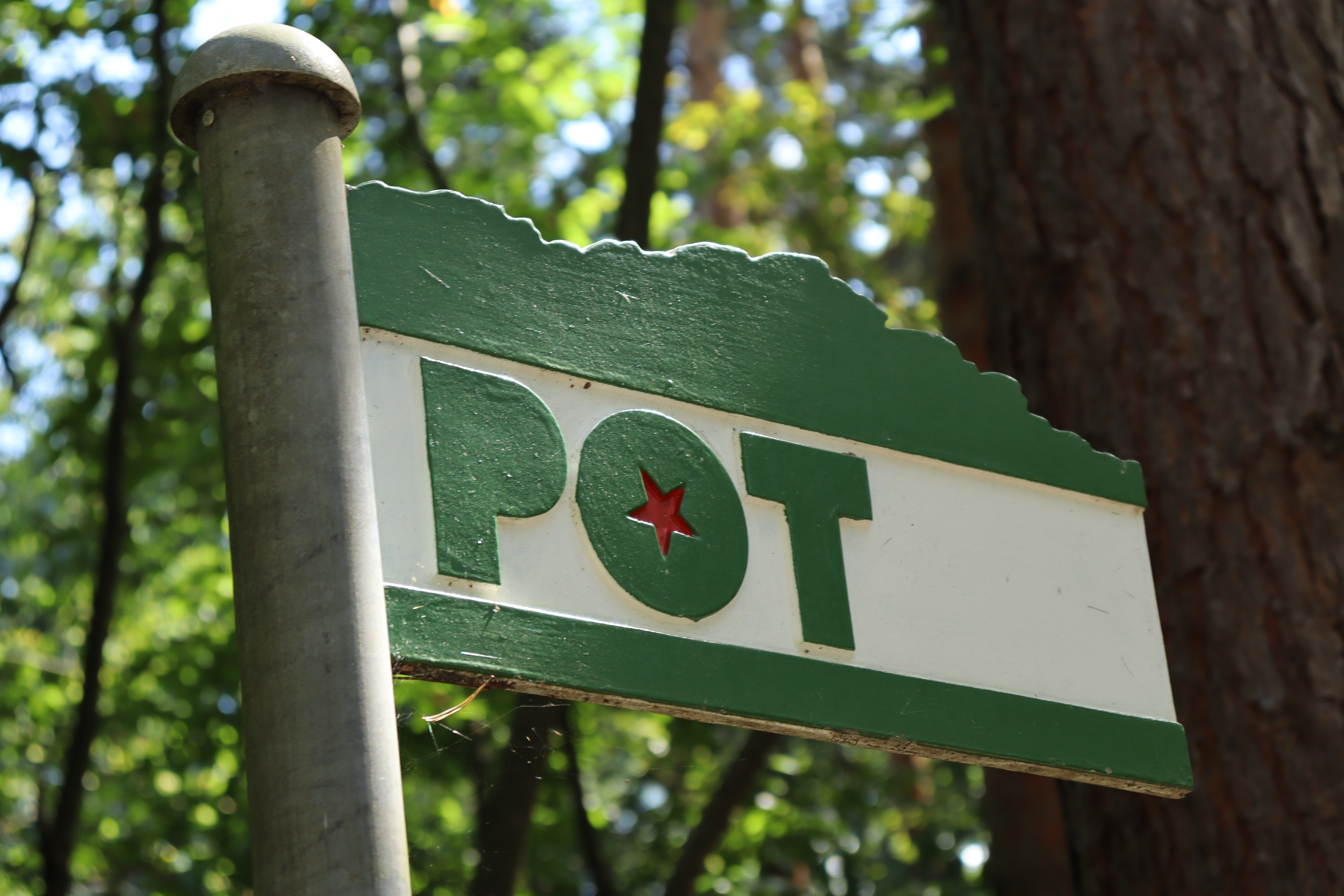
A 'POT' sign on Golovec.

According to a 2018 municipal survey, Golovec is visited by runners, hikers, dog walkers, families, cyclists and downhill cyclists, and kindergarten children.

There is an outdoor fitness center at the foot of the hill. Cycling on the Golovec section of the Trail of Remembrance and Comradeship is prohibited. There are two mountain biking trails on Golovec. The development of trails for mountain bikers is hampered by inadequate legislation and fragmented ownership.

There is a drinking fountain near the turnoff to the observatory. A new one was installed in 2014.

In 2021, as part of the European project URBforDAN, the City of Ljubljana installed information, marking and directional signs, wooden benches, tables and platforms, and several learning points (including a showcase for the presentation of indigenous tree species in Golovec and a forest planetarium) in Golovec, which was a test area. The project cost 690,522 euros, with the European Union contributing 586,943.86 euros.

=== Golovec Forest Educational Trail ===
The circular route is approximately one and a half kilometers long and has 10 stops. The squirrel logo was chosen through a competition. The nearest starting point is Poljane.

It was prepared by students and teachers of Poljane Elementary School in cooperation with the Forestry Institute, the Municipality of Ljubljana and the Ministry of Education, Science and Sports (obtaining permits and materials for the installation of signposts and initial panoramic boards, planning the route). They created a website, a workbook and a brochure. The content part was prepared by the biology club, and some material was also prepared in geography classes. In technical classes, they created signposts with the trail logo. When creating the website, they tested the curriculum of computer science classes for ninth-grade students.

=== Winter sports ===
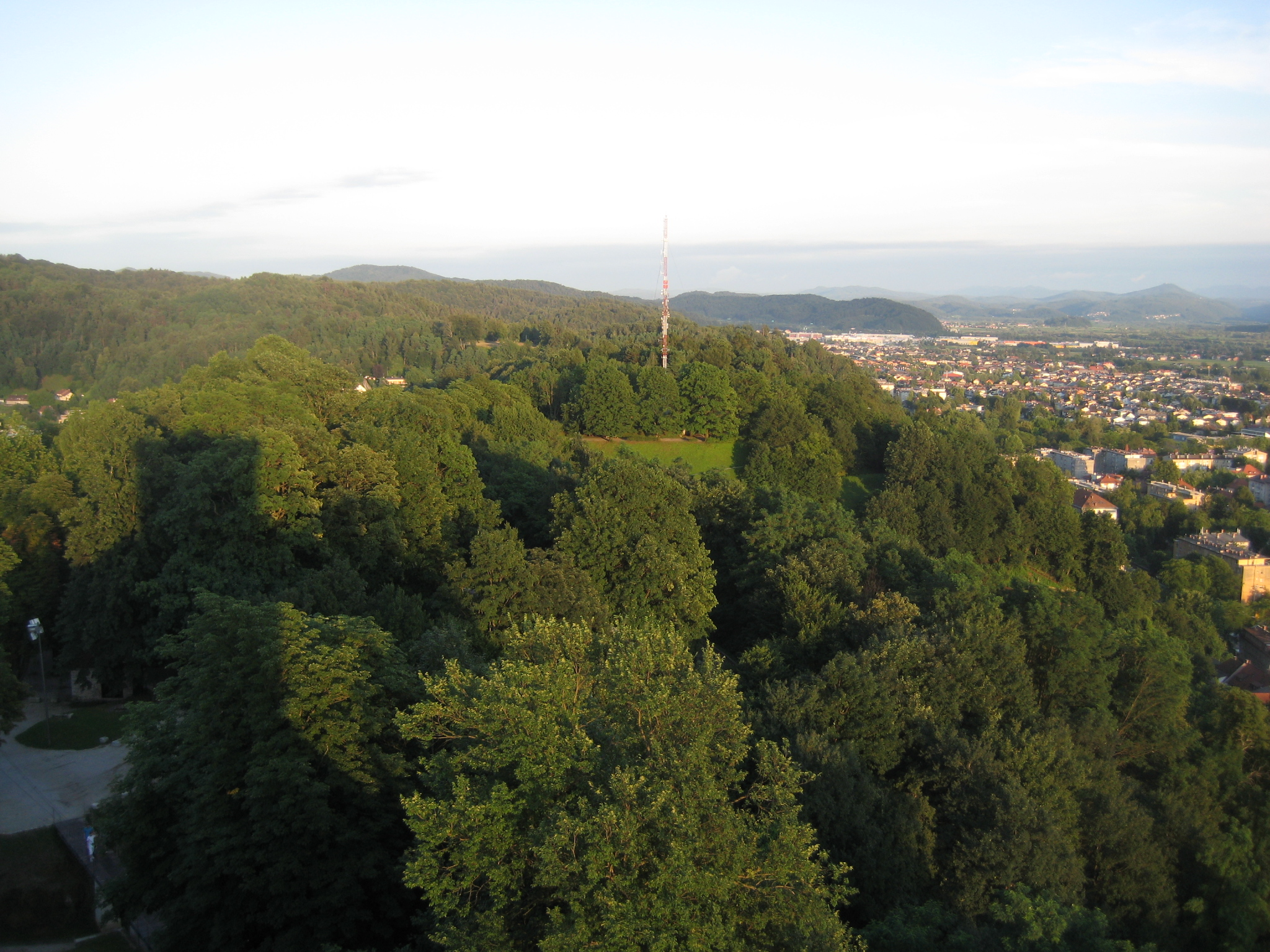
Golovec as seen from the Ljubljana Castle.

The terrain to Orle was designated as suitable for beginner skiers. In 1924, the Skala Tourist Club on Golovec organized a ski race for the youngest. The Ski Club of the Krim Sports Society from Rudnik organized the first downhill in 1935. Skiing was only allowed outside the designated walking areas and on condition that the vegetation was not destroyed. Before World War II, the Korotan Ski Association organized downhill from the top of Golovec towards the Rakovnik lakes on several occasions. The course was approximately 1 km long.

Before World War II, two ski jumps were built below Golovec. The first of these was built in 1931 by "Ljubljana" on Rakovnik and allowed jumps up to 25 meters. Another one stood behind Žerjavac's Bajer in 1994.

The decline in winter activities was influenced by dry and mild winters.

== Paths, roads and landmarks ==
- In the north–southwest direction, over Črni hrib (443 m), there is the Trail of Remembrance and Comradeship and the London - Spodnja Hrušica macadam road.
- In the west–east direction, over Mazovnik and Črni hrib, there is a Camino de Santiago trail and the Slovenian Cycling Trail.
- Between Rakovnik and Zgornja Hrušica there is the Srčna pot.
- Over Mazovnik, it is possible to head east along a footpath or forest road to the village of Orle.

In 1935, the Salesians and donors erected a second Eucharistic cross, 15 meters high, above the Rakovnik church. It was blessed by the director of the Salesian institute. Both were illuminated with light bulbs.

== Access ==
There are many routes leading to Golovec. From the north, you can get there from Štepanjski naselje (city bus lines no. 5, 9, 13), Hrušica or Bizovik (city bus line no. 24), and from the south, from Rakovnik or Rudnik (city bus lines no. 3, N3, 3B, N3B and integrated line 3G).

The closest starting point from the city center is Poljane on the western side of the hill. Here, Golovec is separated from the city by the Gruber Canal, crossed by two bridges, and the Hradecka Road. The Golovec Trail branches off from it, ending at the observatory after just under a kilometer.

The Municipality of Ljubljana has installed barriers at Rakovnik along the Path to the Pond and at the beginning of the forest road into the Konjščica Valley, located between the Zadvorski and Dobrunjski hills. It wants to discourage visitors from arriving by car, as it believes that Golovec is well accessible by city buses and bicycles.

== In media ==
Ljubljana Mayor and businessman Zoran Janković likes to repeat stories about walks around Golovec in his speeches.

== See also ==
- Tivoli City Park
- Triglav National Park
- Polhov Gradec Hills
- Nanos (plateau)
- Mount Krim
