= Trail of Remembrance and Comradeship =

Walkway in Ljubljana, Slovenia

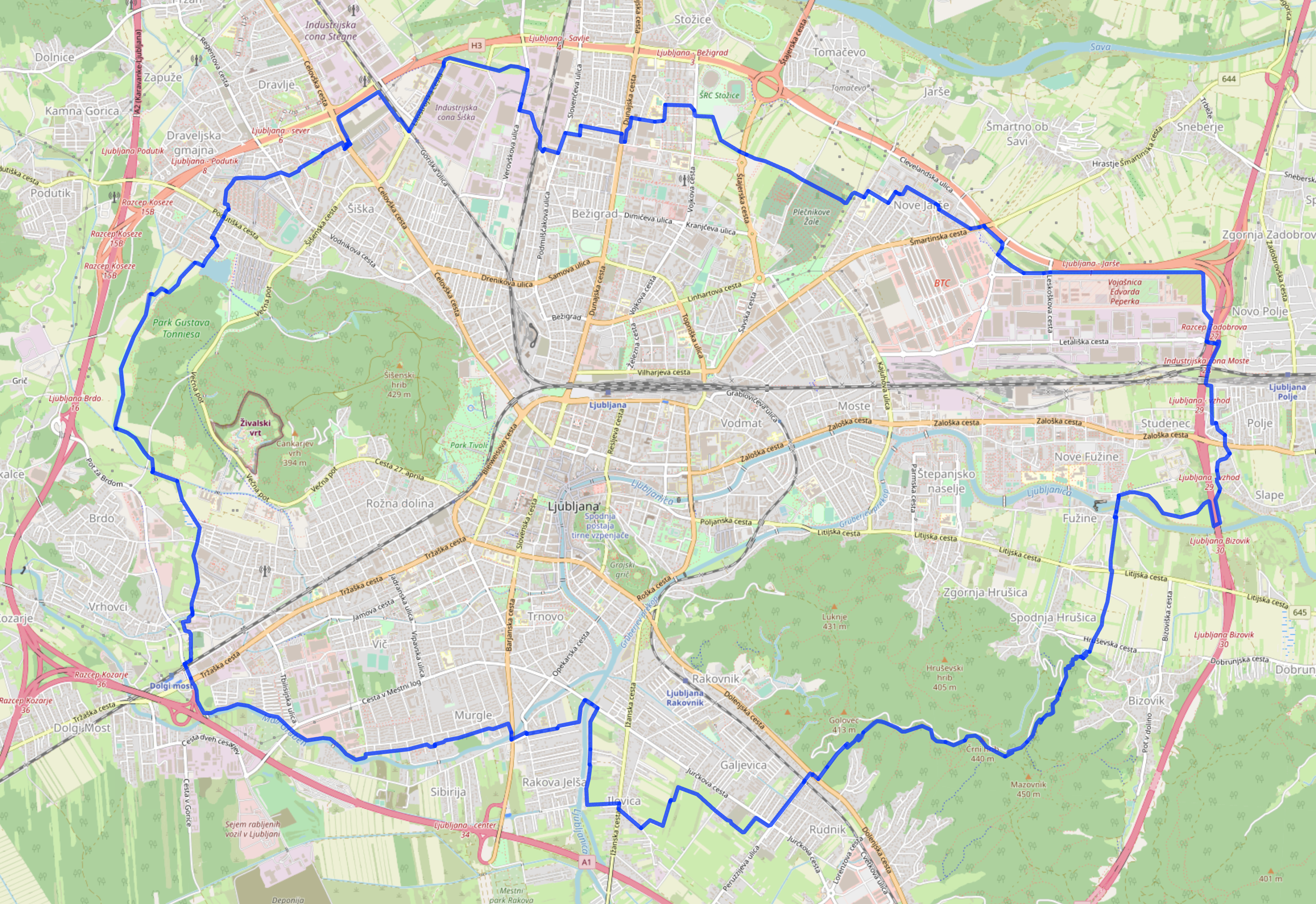
The trail marked in blue on an OpenStreetMap of Ljubljana

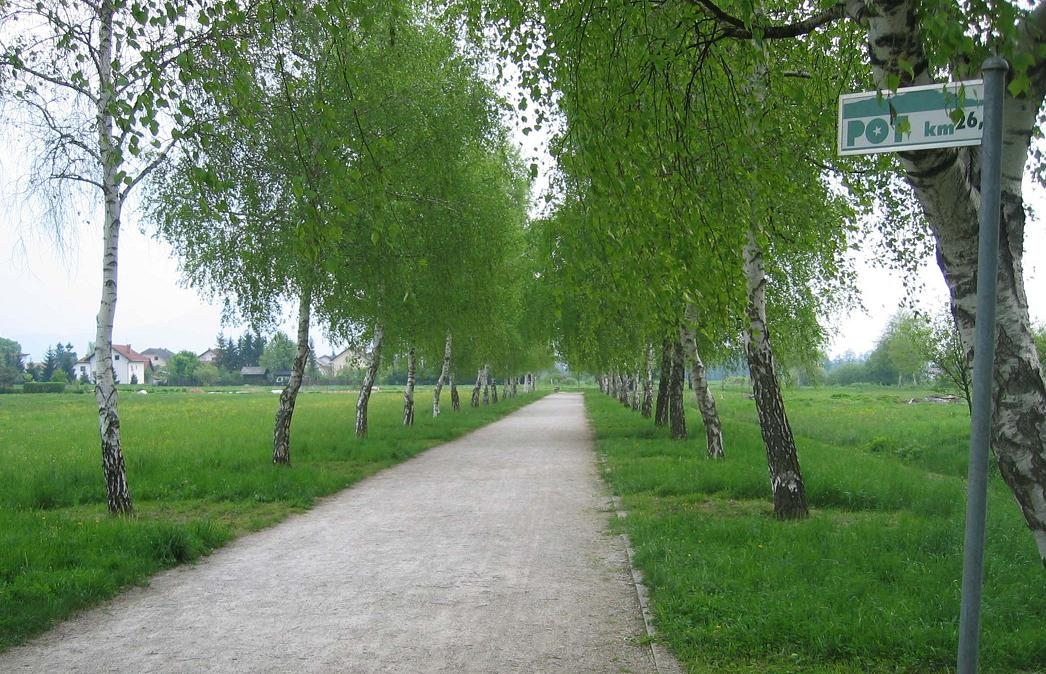
An avenue of birches along the trail in the Rudnik District

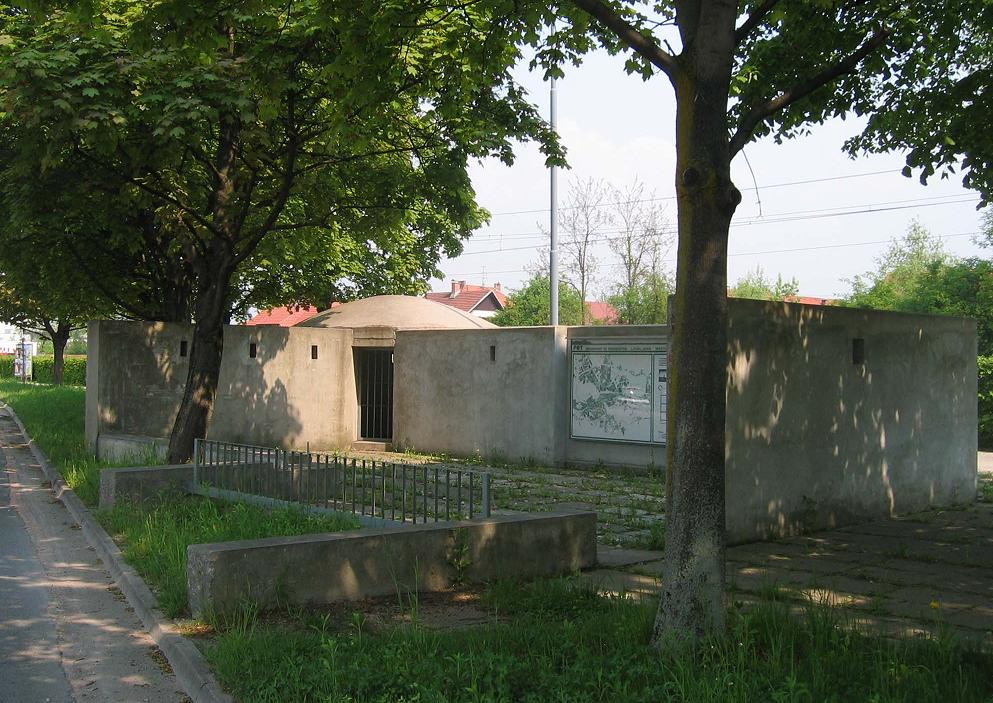
Remains of an Italian military bunker in the Šiška District

The Trail of Remembrance and Comradeship (Slovene: Pot spominov in tovarištva, initials PST), also referred to as the Trail Along the Wire (Pot ob žici), the Trail Around Ljubljana (Pot okoli Ljubljane), or the Green Ring (Zeleni prstan), is a gravel-paved recreational and memorial walkway almost 33 km (21 mi) long and 4 m (13 ft) wide around the city of Ljubljana, the capital of Slovenia. The walkway leads past Koseze Pond and across Golovec Hill.

During World War II the Province of Ljubljana, annexed by Fascist Italy, was subjected to brutal repression after the emergence of resistance. The Italian forces erected a barbed wire fence—the route of which is now the Trail of Remembrance and Comradeship—around Ljubljana to prevent communication between the city's underground Liberation Front activists in Ljubljana and the Slovene Partisans in the surrounding countryside. The barbed wire surrounded the town from February 1942 until provisional Yugoslav Prime Minister Tito visited the town on 26 June 1945 after its liberation on 9 May 1945.

The construction of the trail started in 1974 and was completed in 1985. It is marked by signposts, information boards with the map of the trail, plaques, and metal markers, as well as signposts at the turn-offs. One hundred and two octagonal memorial stones, designed by the architect Vlasto Kopač, have been installed at the former positions of the bunkers. Along the green area adjacent to it, 7,400 trees of 49 tree species have been planted. Since 1988, it has been protected as a designated nature monument.

The trail is used by many residents of Ljubljana walking, jogging and cycling each day. During snowy winters, cross-country ski tracks are provided at some of its sections. On the weekend closest to 9 May of each year since 1957 a traditional recreational March along the Wire (Pohod ob Žici; it had several names since it started) has been held to commemorate the liberation of Ljubljana on 9 May 1945. Those who walk the entire distance and collect stamps at all eight checkpoints receive a memorial badge and a medal. Because of Ljubljana's growth over the years, the path now crosses some built-up areas. Examples include the segment from Koseze crossing Klagenfurt Street (Celovška cesta) and Vienna Street (Dunajska cesta) and ending near Stožice Stadium.

== See also ==
- Province of Ljubljana
