= Daljna Vas =

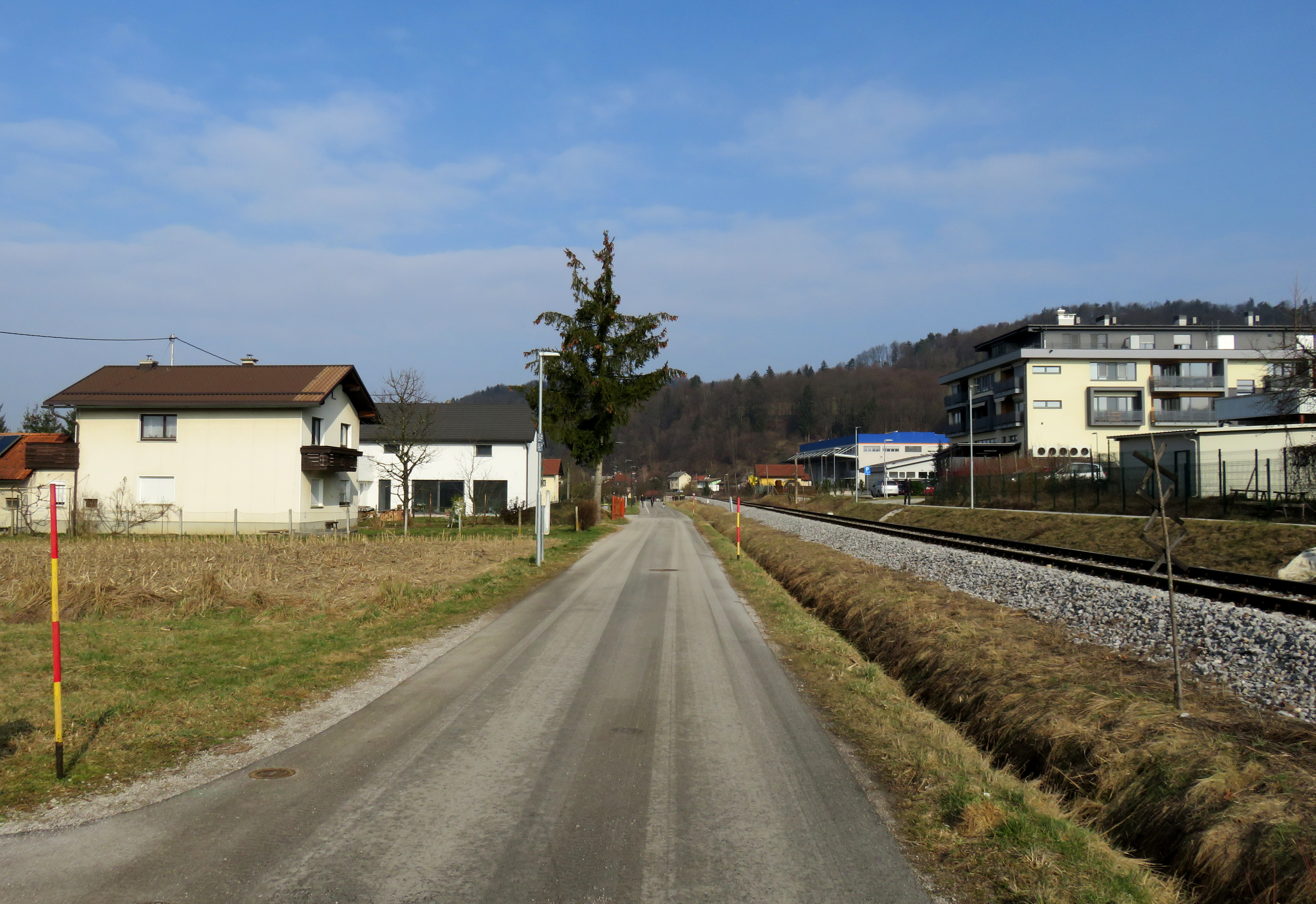

- Location in Slovenia
- Coordinates: 46°00′00″N 14°33′14″E
- Country: Slovenia
- Traditional region: Lower Carniola
- Statistical region: Central Slovenia
- Municipality: Škofljica
- Elevation: 296 m (971 ft)

Daljna Vas (pronounced [ˈdaːlna ˈʋaːs], Slovene: Daljna vas, in older sources also Dalenja Vas, German: Doleinawaß) is a former village in central Slovenia in the Municipality of Škofljica. It is now part of the village of Lavrica. It is part of the traditional region of Lower Carniola and is now included in the Central Slovenia Statistical Region.

== Geography ==
Daljna Vas was an elongated settlement below Orle along the southwest base of Fat Hill (Slovene: Debeli hrib, elevation: 395 meters or 1,296 feet) and continuing southeast along the road and rail line to Škofljica. The Ljubljana Marsh lies to the southwest.

== History ==
A school was established in Daljna Vas in 1926. Lavrica was formerly a hamlet of Daljna Vas, consisting of only a few houses near the train station. This relationship was reversed in 1961, when the name Lavrica was applied to a merged settlement consisting of Daljna Vas and parts of Babna Gorica, Srednja Vas, Škofljica, and Ljubljana.
