= Babna Gora, Dobrova–Polhov Gradec =

Babna Gora
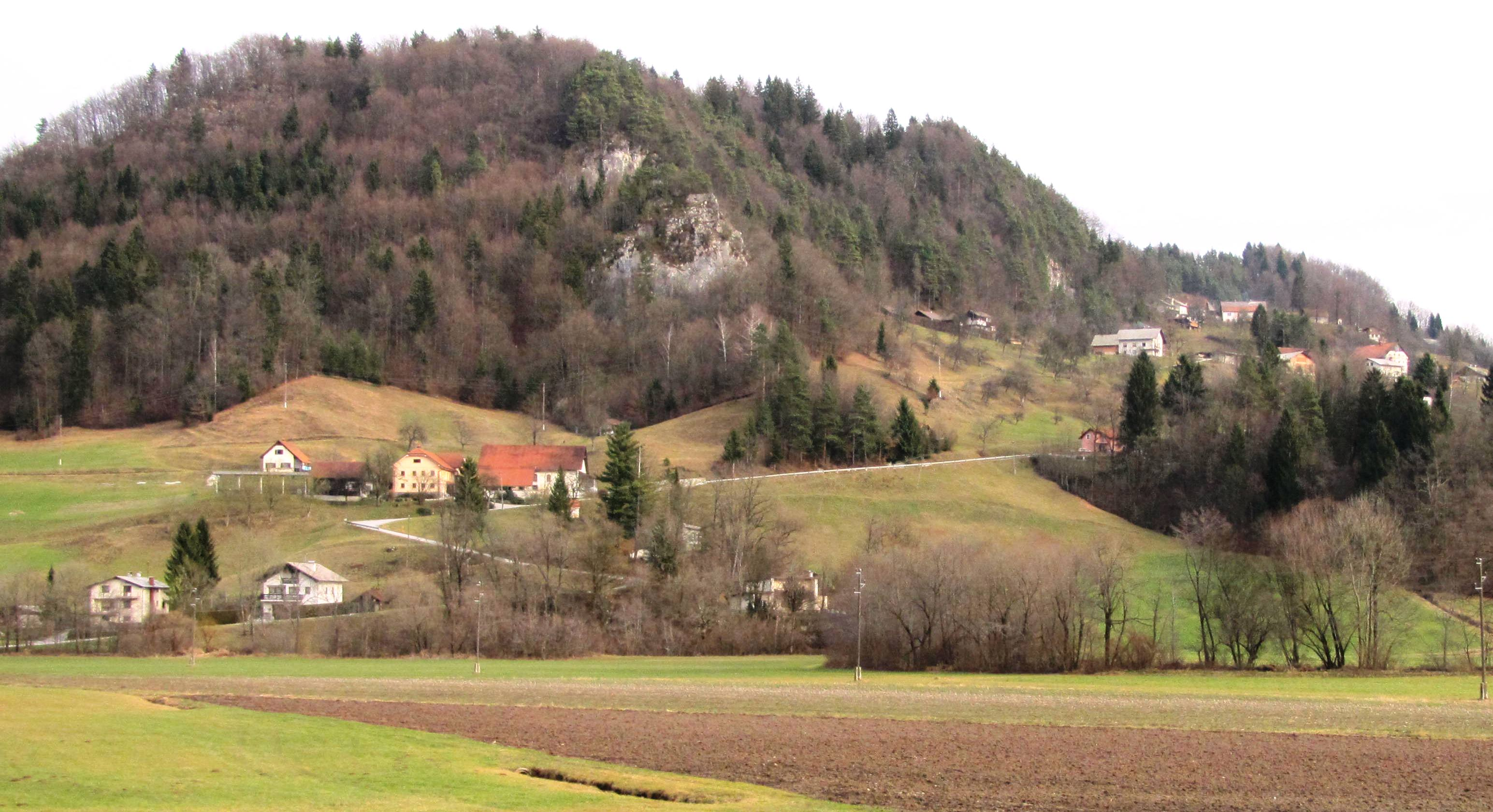
- Babna Gora with Veternik Hill in the background

- Location in Slovenia
- Coordinates: 46°3′50.11″N 14°21′50.59″E
- Country: Slovenia
- Traditional region: Upper Carniola
- Statistical region: Central Slovenia
- Municipality: Dobrova–Polhov Gradec

Area
  - Total: 3.51 km^{2} (1.36 sq mi)
- Elevation: 439.9 m (1,443 ft)

Population (2020)
  - Total: 218
  - Density: 62.1/km^{2} (161/sq mi)

Babna Gora (pronounced [ˈbaːbna ˈɡɔːɾa]; German: Babnagora) is a dispersed settlement, east of Polhov Gradec in the Municipality of Dobrova–Polhov Gradec in the Upper Carniola region of Slovenia. It includes the hamlet of Zibel to the southwest of the main settlement and other scattered farms.

== Geography ==
Babna Gora is a scattered village below Veternik Hill (554 meters or 1,818 feet; also known as Vetrnik or Tabor) and a cliff known as Babčar Fort (Babčarjev tabor, 463 meters or 1,519 feet), both standing northeast of the village. A small valley named Pustote lies below the road into the village, where there is a spring. Tilled fields and meadows lie below the village to the northwest, along the Gradaščica River, which is prone to flash floods.

== Name ==
Babna Gora was first mentioned in 1315 as ouf dem Babenberch pei dem Steyn (literally, 'on Mount Baben by the stone') and in 1490 as Babina Gora, among other variations. It is mentioned as Wabnagora or Babnagora in Johann Weikhard von Valvasor's 1689 work The Glory of the Duchy of Carniola. In the past it was known as Babnagora in German. Oral tradition claims that the name Babna Gora (literally, 'women's mountain' or 'broad's mountain') is derived from the Babčar Fort (see below) because the local women would take refuge there and to repel Turkish attacks. However, because the fortification postdates the 1315 attestation of the village's name (the Turks attacked the area only once, in 1476), this is merely a folk explanation. In fact, lone cliffs or rock formations are often named Baba 'old woman' or Dedec 'old man' in Slovenia, and it is from this that the toponym Babna Gora and estate name Babčar are derived. Compare the similar name Babna Gorica.

== History ==
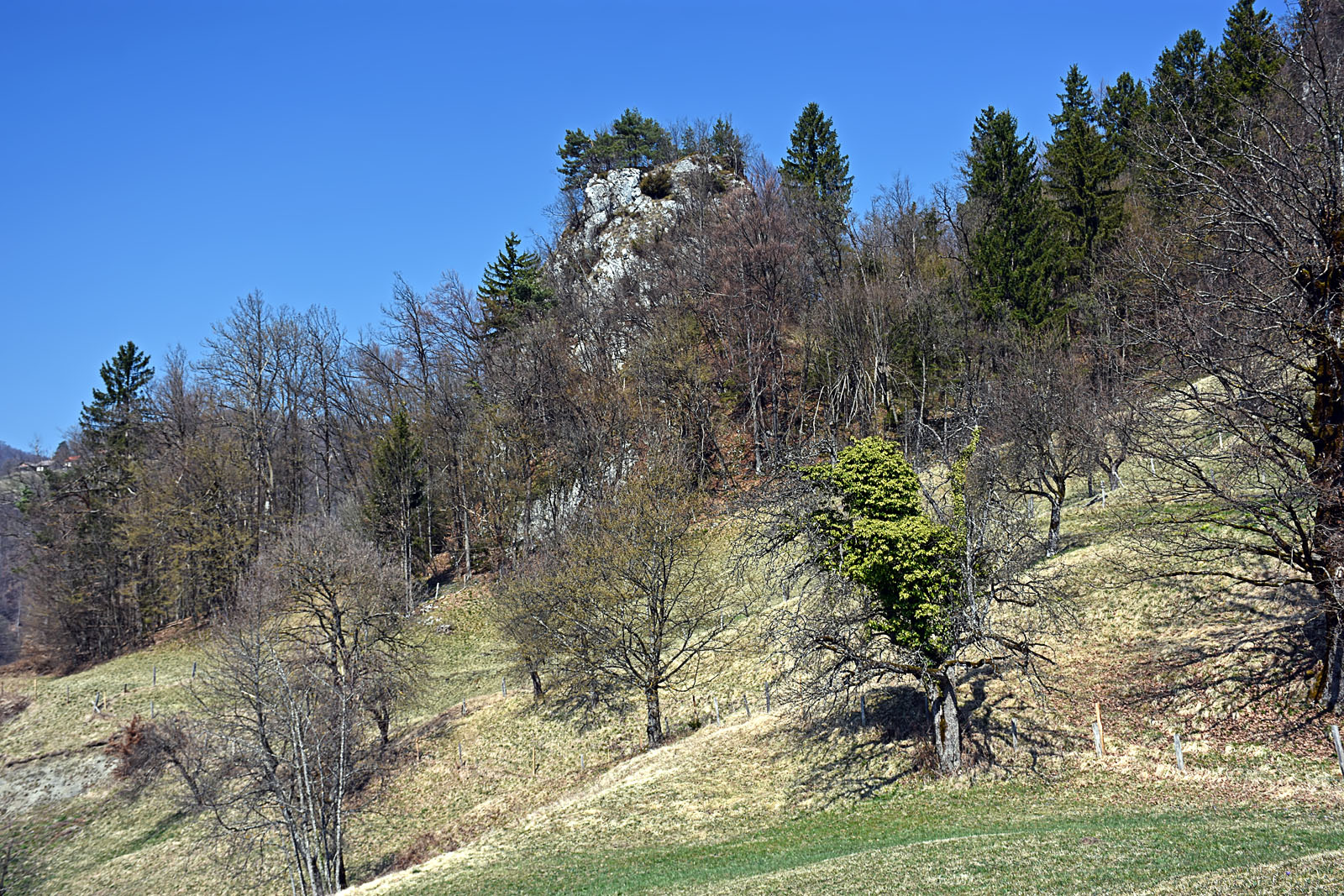
Babčar Fort

Valvasor's 1689 The Glory of the Duchy of Carniola states that an "old, destroyed, mighty camp" stood at the top of Veternik Hill and that it was a "large structure, containing fourteen rooms." This fortification, the Babčar Fort (Babčarjev tabor), is named after the Babčar farm in the village and dates back to at least the 15th century. The ruins of the Babčar Fort are protected as cultural heritage.

=== Mass grave ===
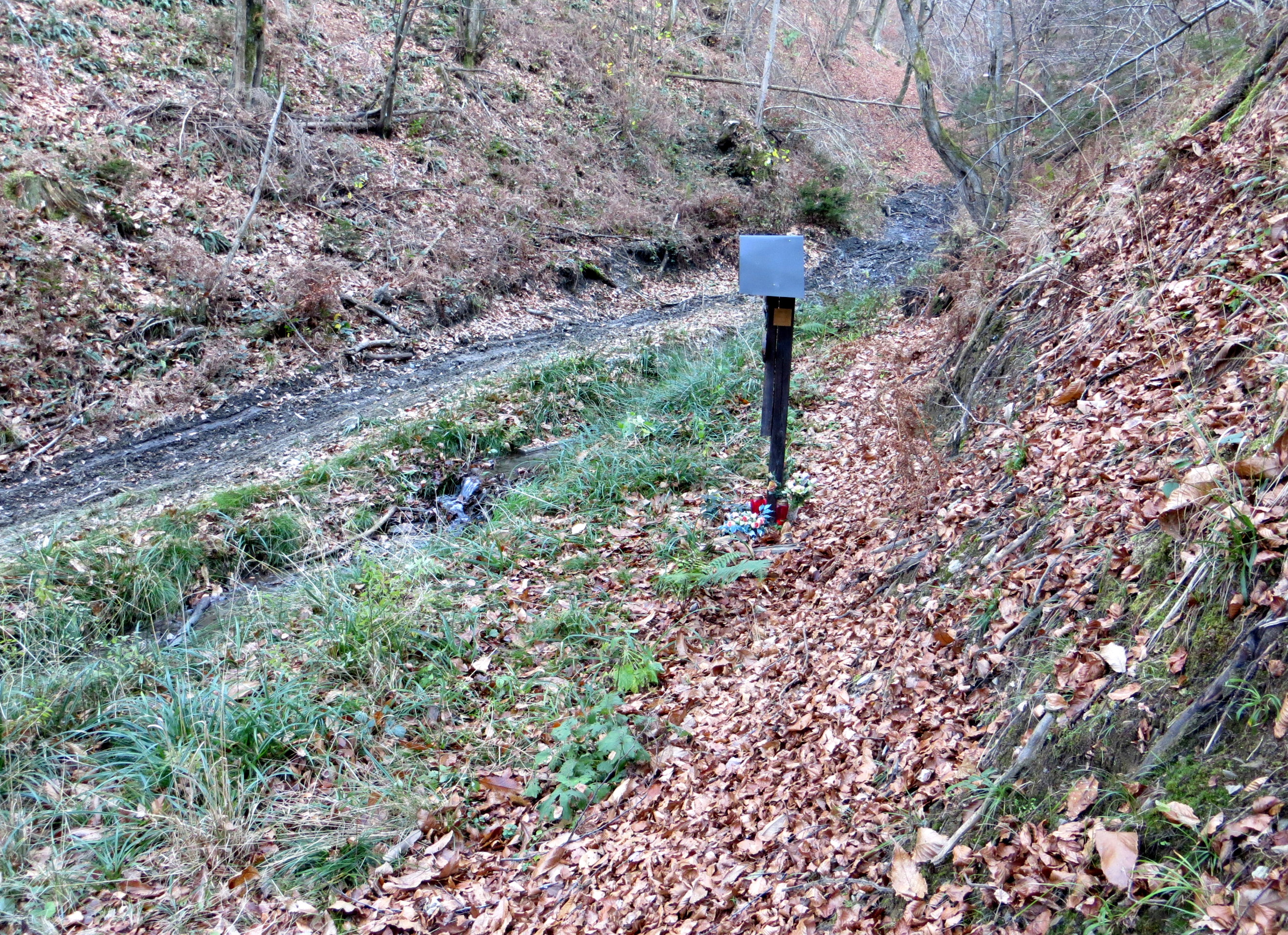
Hudnik family mass grave

The forest just outside Babna Gora is the site of a civilian mass grave from World War II known as the Martinčič Family Grave [sic] (Slovene: Grob Martinčičeve družine). The victims were nine members of the Hudnik family from the Martinovec farm (an estate name) that were killed by the Partisans on November 24, 1942 for sheltering a deserter. This was the largest family massacre in Slovenia during the war. The remains of the victims were exhumed and genetically identified in 2016.

== Cultural heritage ==
In addition to the Babčar Fort, several other structures in Babna Gora have protected cultural monument status:

- Veternik Fort (Gradišče Veternik) is a prehistoric archaeological site on an artificial terrace on Veternik Hill measuring approximately 50 by 20 m. Pottery shards and remnants of a ceramic coil were discovered here.
- The house at Babna Gora no. 18, in the hamlet of Zibel, is a single-story stone-walled house with a central entryway and dormer. The year 1843 is carved into the circular door casing made of black limestone, and fragments of painting are preserved on the facade.
- At Babna Gora no. 8, at the Glažar Farm, there is a black marble plaque commemorating that the Executive Committee of the Liberation Front spent the winter of 1942/43 here. The memorial was installed in 1951.
- In the upper part of the settlement before the forest, known as Rupe, there is a stone wall topped with the triple crest of Mount Triglav and a black marble plaque commemorating a temporary Partisan encampment during the Second World War and a checkpoint for the regional committee of the Communist Party. The memorial was created in 1958.

== Gallery ==
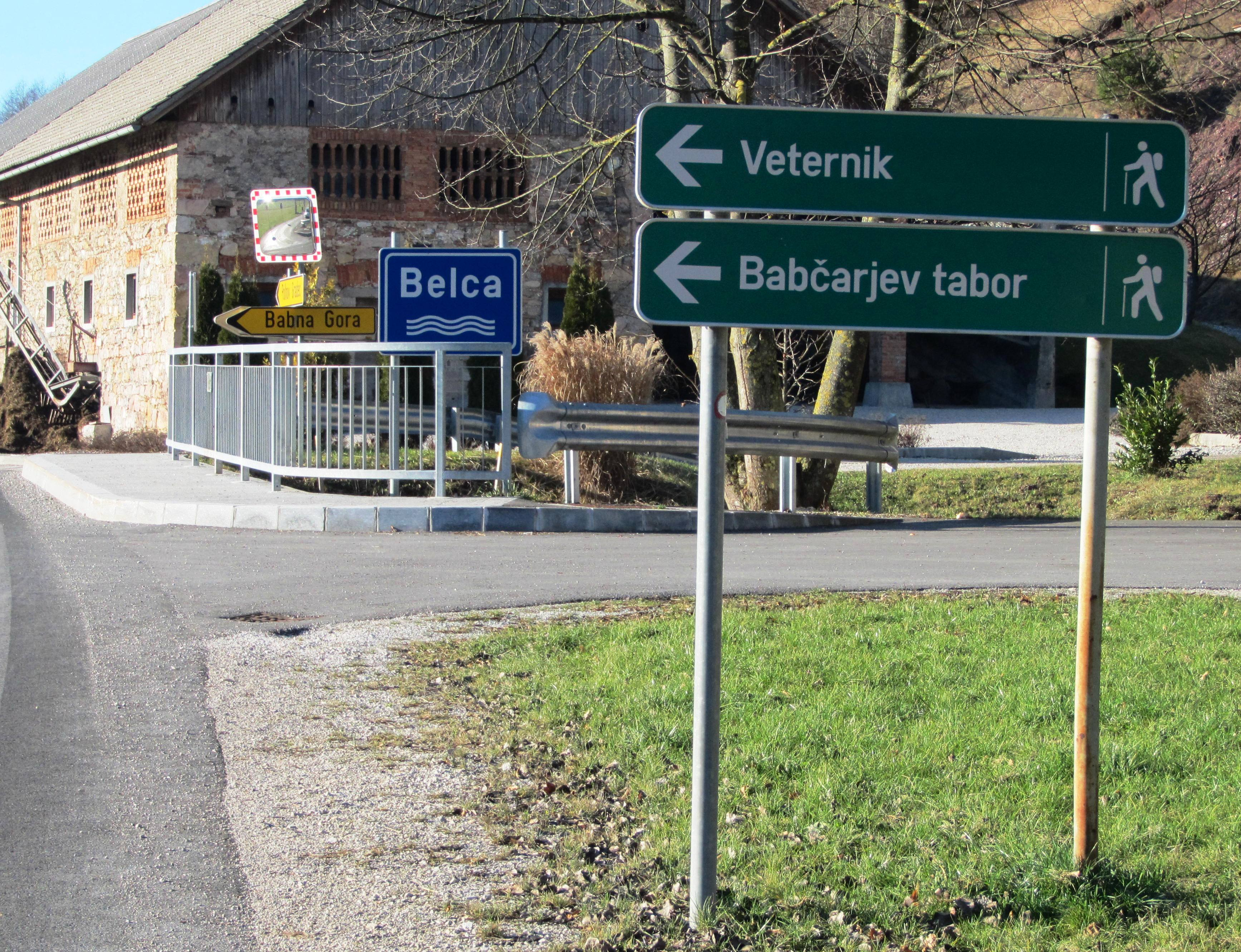
Signs for Babna Gora marking the paths to Veternik Hill and the Babčar Fort, as well as Belca Creek

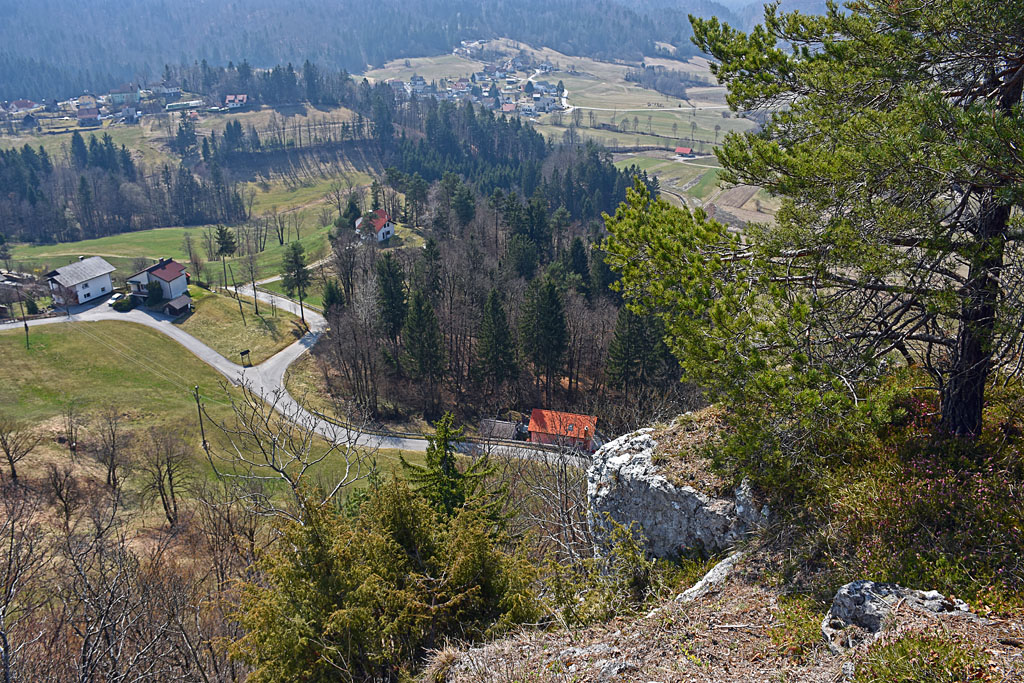
Babčar Fort summit view
