= Lavrica =

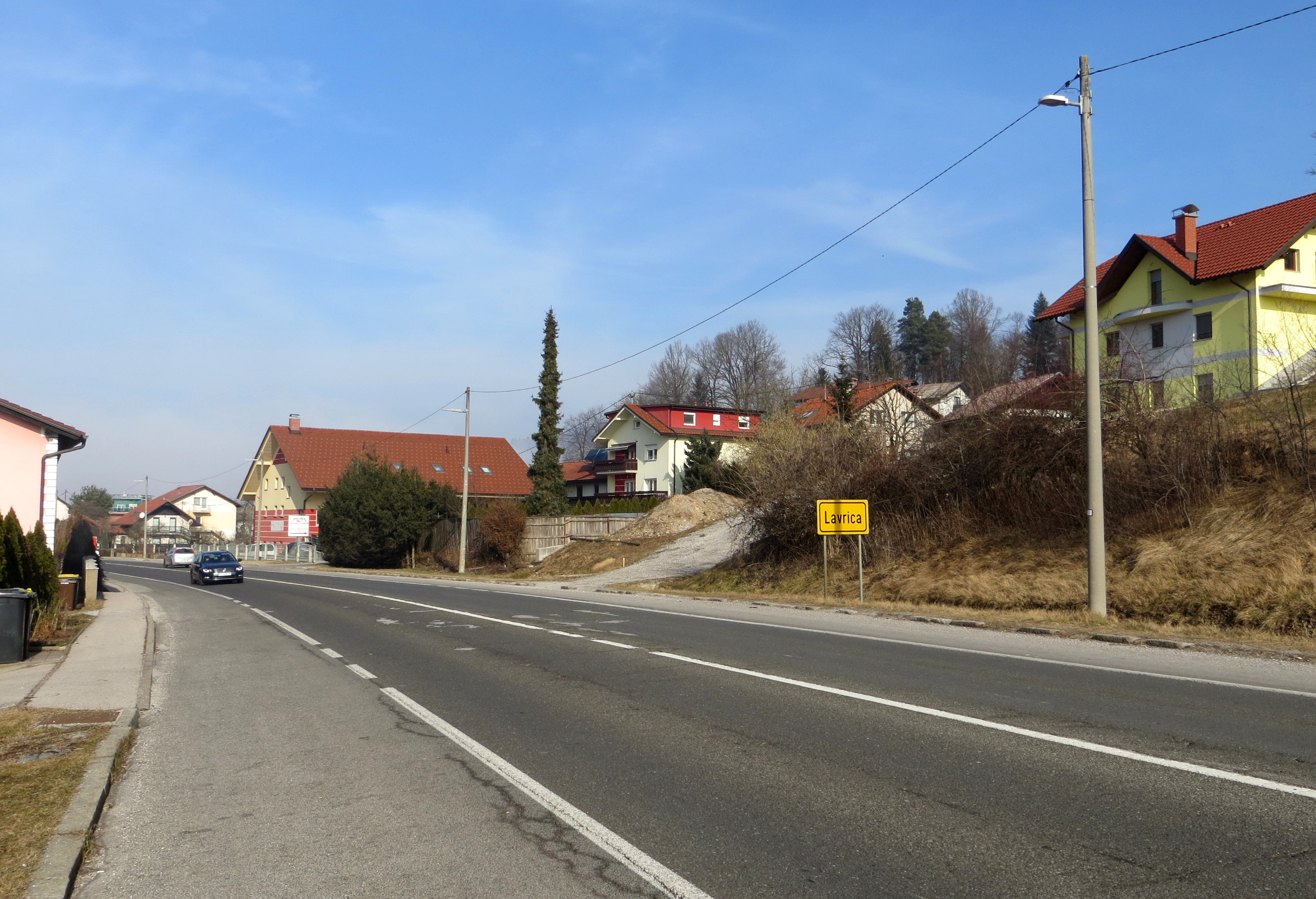

- Location in Slovenia
- Coordinates: 46°0′10.83″N 14°33′21.02″E
- Country: Slovenia
- Traditional region: Lower Carniola
- Statistical region: Central Slovenia
- Municipality: Škofljica

Area
  - Total: 9.92 km^{2} (3.83 sq mi)
- Elevation: 308.6 m (1,012 ft)

Population (2002)
  - Total: 2,120
- Postal code: 1291

Lavrica (pronounced [ˈlaːu̯ɾitsa], in older sources also Laverca) is a settlement in central Slovenia. It lies southeast of the capital Ljubljana in the Municipality of Škofljica.

== Geography ==
The railway line from Ljubljana to Novo Mesto runs through the settlement. The municipality is part of the traditional region of Lower Carniola and is now included in the Central Slovenia Statistical Region. It includes the hamlets of Daljna Vas (Slovene: Daljna vas), Babna Gorica (in older sources also Babina Gorica), Srednja Vas (Srednja vas), and Sela pri Rudniku (German: Sela bei Rudnik).

== Name ==
Based on medieval sources, the name Lavrica is a univerbation of *Lavričeva vas (literally, 'village belonging to Lavro/Laver'), thus referring to an early inhabitant of the place.

== History ==
Archaeological finds in Lavrica attest to early settlement of the site. Bronze items from pile-dwellers include a pin and a beaver trap. The Roman road from Emona to Neviodunum ran through the settlement along the same main route used today. A school was established in Lavrica in 1926. The building was burned by the Partisans in March 1944, destroying the archives and library. It was rebuilt in 1947.

Lavrica was formerly a hamlet of Daljna Vas. It became an independent settlement in 1961, when the name was applied to a merged settlement consisting of Daljna Vas and parts of Babna Gorica, Srednja Vas, Škofljica, and Ljubljana. The territory of the village was expanded in 1983, when it annexed the remainder of Babna Gorica and Srednja Vas as well as Sela pri Rudniku.

== Notable people ==
Notable people that were born or lived in Lavrica include:

- Terezija Jenko (1864–1938), social worker
- Josip Lenče (1865–1920), innkeeper, businessman, and politician
