= Spodnja Hrušica =

- Location in Slovenia
- Coordinates: 46°2′32.37″N 14°33′33.01″E
- Country: Slovenia
- Traditional region: Lower Carniola
- Statistical region: Central Slovenia
- Municipality: Ljubljana
- Elevation: 290 m (950 ft)

Spodnja Hrušica (pronounced [ˈspoːdnja ˈxɾuːʃitsa]; in older sources also Dolenja Hrušica, German: Unterbirnbaum) is a formerly independent settlement southeast of the capital Ljubljana in central Slovenia. It belongs to the City Municipality of Ljubljana. It is part of the traditional region of Lower Carniola and is now included with the rest of the municipality in the Central Slovenia Statistical Region.

== Geography ==
Spodnja Hrušica is an elongated settlement east of Zgornja Hrušica, from which it is separated by Graben Creek, which flows from Golovec Hill and empties into the Ljubljanica River. The houses stand along the road to Bizovik and north to Litija Street (Slovene: Litijska cesta). The soil is loamy, becoming more sandy to the north.

== Name ==
Together with neighboring Zgornja Hrušica (literally, 'upper Hrušica'), Spodnja Hrušica (literally, 'lower Hrušica') was attested in written records in 1243 as Pirpovm and Pyrpowm (and as Pirpavmein in 1251, Pirpoum in 1253, and in der Grusnitz in 1491). The Slovene name is derived from the common noun *hruša 'pear'. The medieval attestations contain the Middle High German roots pir(e) 'pear' and boum 'tree'. In the past the German name was Unterbirnbaum (literally, 'lower pear tree').

== History ==
A primary school was established in Spodnja Hrušica in 1884. Until the Second World War, many washerwomen were active in Spodnja Hrušica; they washed clothing in Graben Creek. This activity died out after the Second World War. During the war, Italian forces extended the road south of Spodnja Hrušica onto Golovec Hill. Spodnja Hrušica was annexed by the city of Ljubljana in 1982, ending its existence as an independent settlement.

== Notable people ==
Notable people that were born or lived in Spodnja Hrušica include:

- Ivan Bricelj (1893–1973), engineer that directed the construction of the Nebotičnik building
