= Rudnik District =

Rudnik District Četrtna skupnost Rudnik
- District
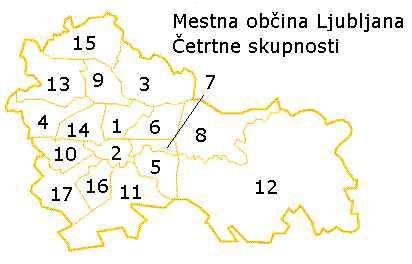
- Map of districts in Ljubljana. The Rudnik District is number 11.

- Location in Slovenia
- Coordinates: 46°1′8.01″N 14°32′43.34″E
- Country: Slovenia
- Traditional region: Lower Carniola
- Statistical region: Central Slovenia
- Municipality: Ljubljana

Area
  - Total: 25.48 km^{2} (9.84 sq mi)

Population (2014)
  - Total: 13,558

The Rudnik District (pronounced [ˈɾuːdnik], Slovene: Četrtna skupnost Rudnik), or simply Rudnik, is a district (mestna četrt) of the City Municipality of Ljubljana, the capital of Slovenia. It is named after the former village of Rudnik.

== Geography ==
The Rudnik District is bounded on the northwest by the Ljubljanica River, on the northeast by the crest of Golovec Hill, and on the south by the A2 Freeway and a line running through the Ljubljana Marsh. The district includes the former village of Rudnik and the marsh hamlets of Ilovica, Volar, Pri Strahu, Pri Maranzu, Kožuh, and Havptmance.
