= Babna Gorica =

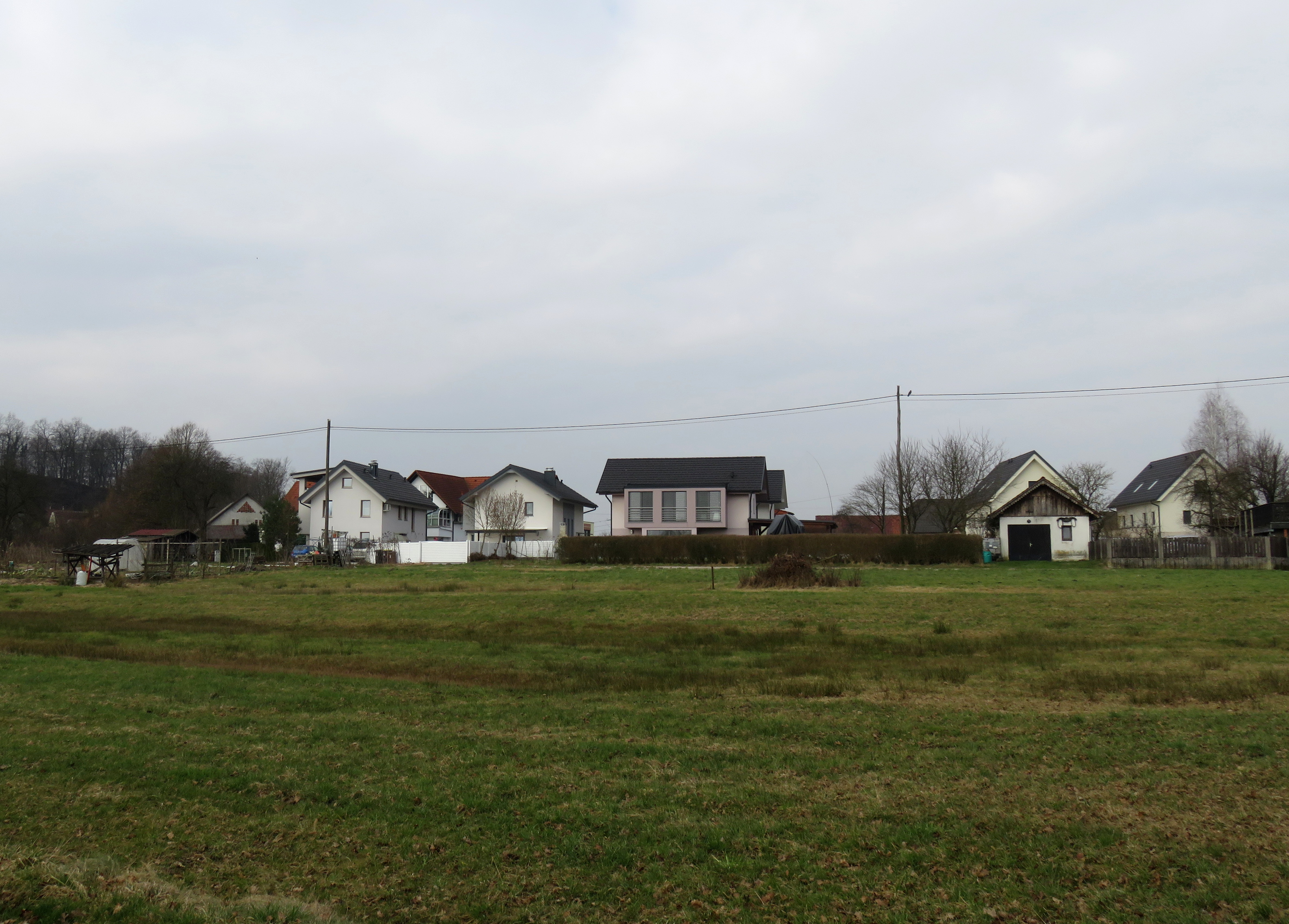

- Location in Slovenia
- Coordinates: 45°59′26″N 14°33′17″E
- Country: Slovenia
- Traditional region: Lower Carniola
- Statistical region: Central Slovenia
- Municipality: Škofljica
- Elevation: 295 m (968 ft)

Babna Gorica (pronounced [ˈbaːbna ɡɔˈɾiːtsa], in older sources Babina Gorica, German: Babnagoritza) is a former settlement in central Slovenia in the southwest part of Lavrica. It is part of the traditional region of Lower Carniola and is now included with the rest of the municipality in the Central Slovenia Statistical Region.

== Geography ==
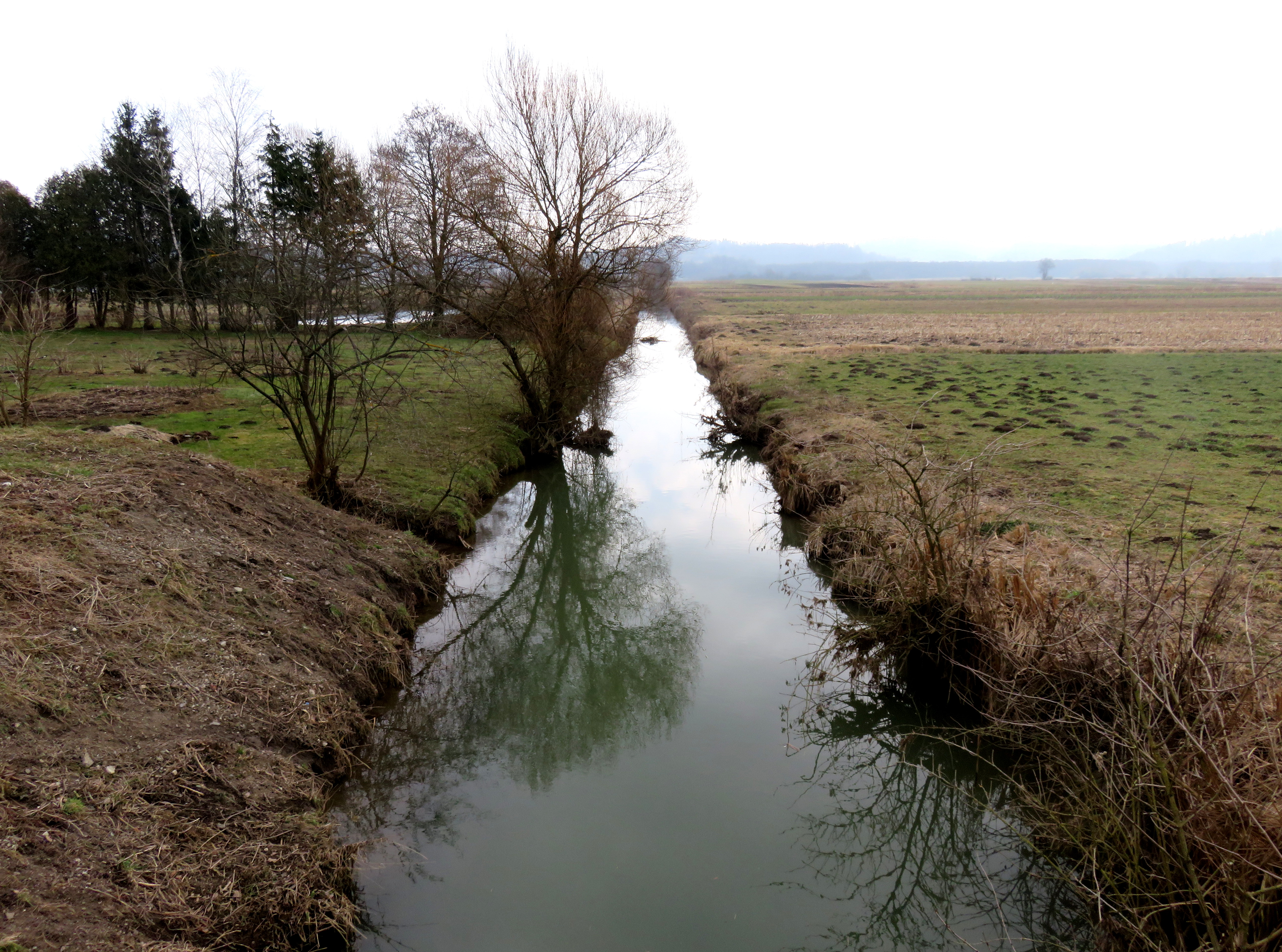
Škofeljščica Creek (a.k.a. Izar Creek)

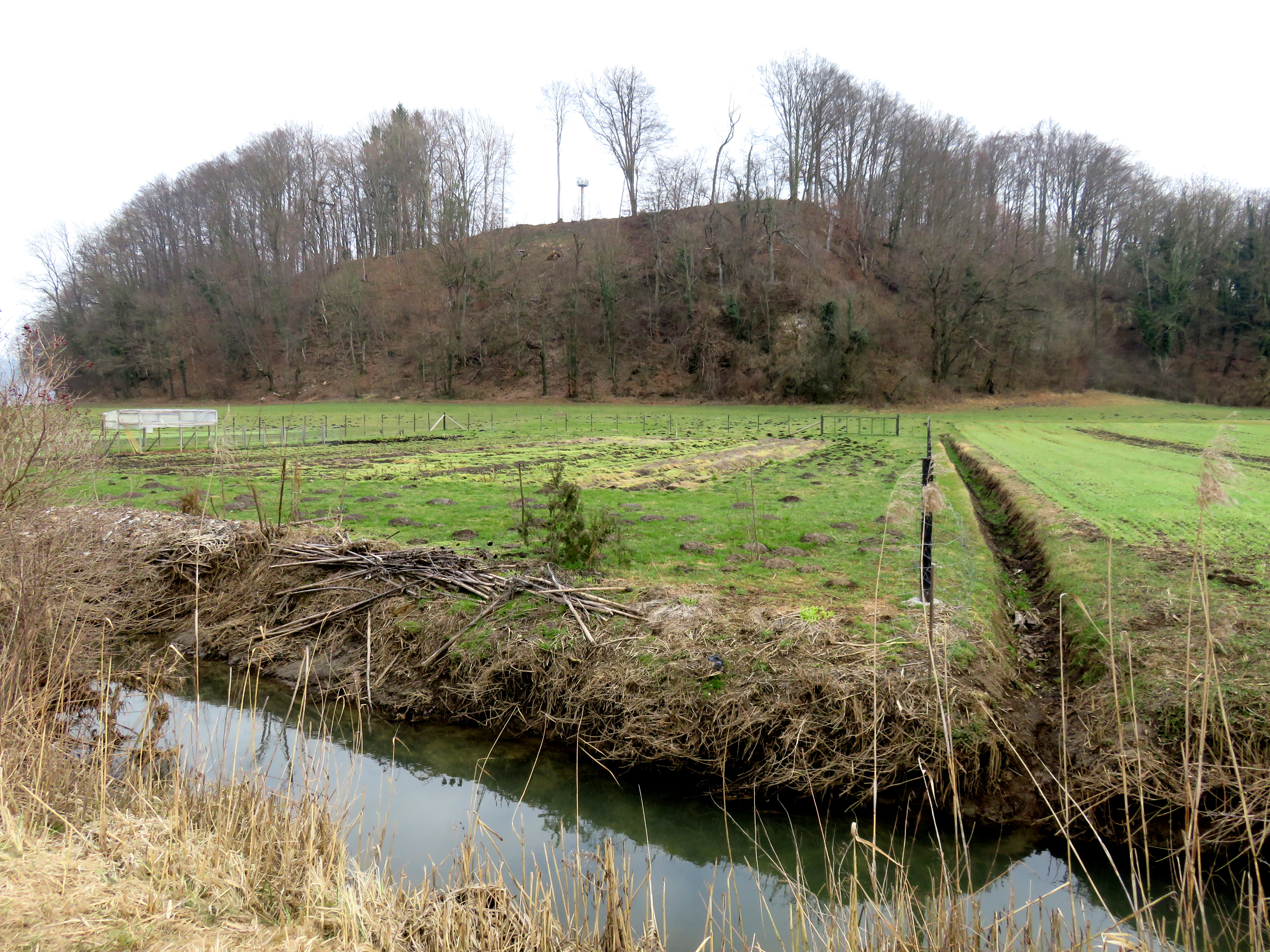
Hill above Babna Gorica

Babna Gorica lies southeast of the village center of Lavrica below the north slope of a hill with the same name (elevation 328 meters or 1,076 feet). It is a clustered village in the Ljubljana Marsh. Škofeljščica Creek—also known as Izar Creek, or considered a tributary of Izar Creek—runs southwest of the village. Fields and meadows lie to the north, there are additional fields to the east and west, and there are marshy meadows to the south. There is a gravel quarry on the hill above the village.

== Name ==
The name Bab(i)na Gorica literally means 'old woman's hill'. However, lone cliffs, rock formations, or hills are often named Baba 'old woman' or Dedec 'old man' in Slovenia, and it is from this that the name of the hill above the village, and thus the village's name, is derived (compare the similar name Babna Gora).

== History ==
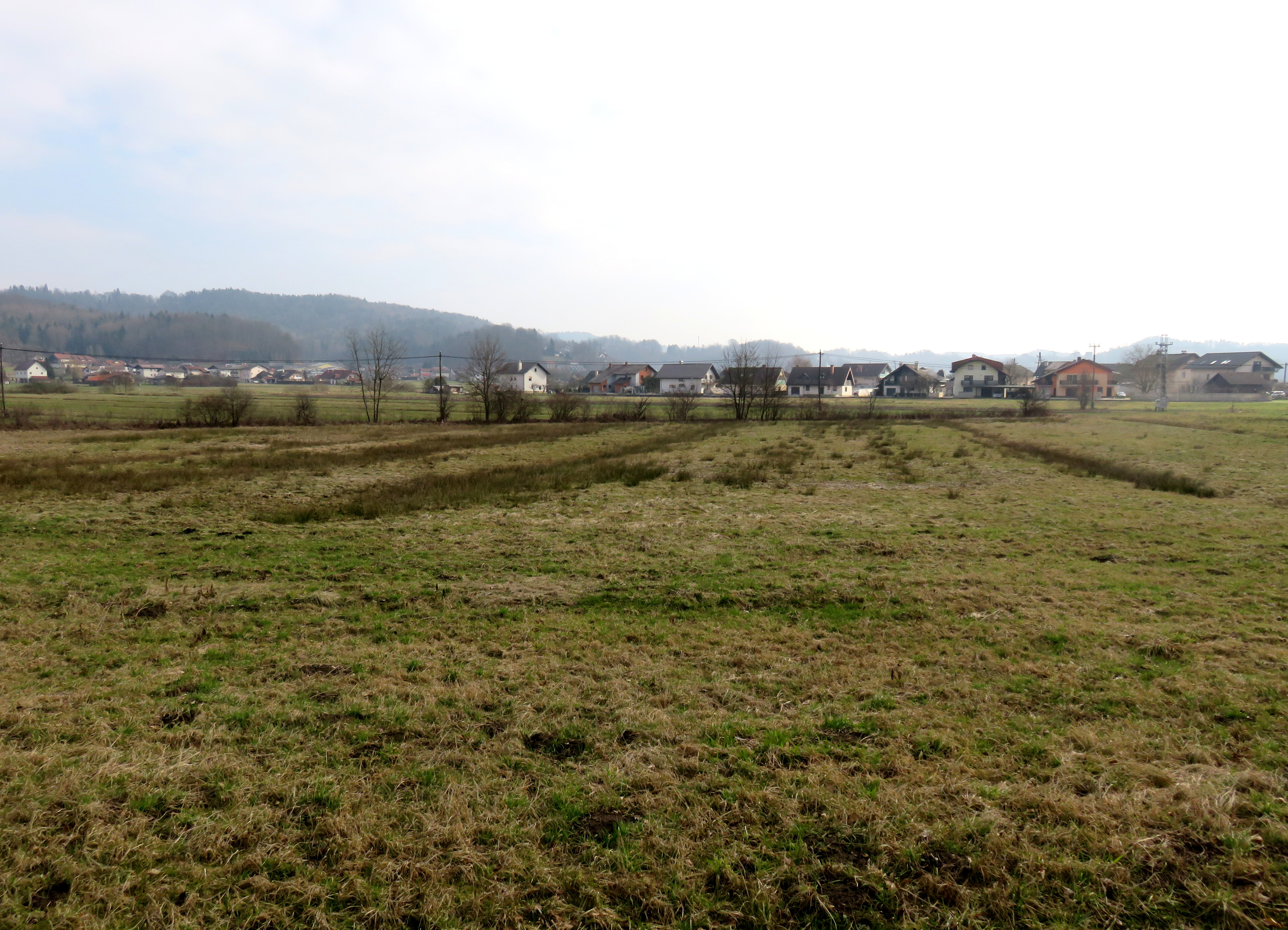
Former peat bed in Babna Gorica

Traces of a Roman road were discovered near Babna Gorica during peat excavation. Babna Gorica had a population of 54 (in 8 houses) in 1880, 61 (in 10 houses) in 1900, and 100 (in 19 houses) in 1931. Babna Gorica was one of the last locations in the Ljubljana Marsh where peat was dug in significant quantities, and a peat litter processing plant was located south of the village.

The eastern part of Babna Gorica was annexed by Lavrica in 1961, and the remainder of the village was annexed by Ljubljana in 1983. The entire territory of the former village is now part of Lavrica.
