= Štepanja Vas =

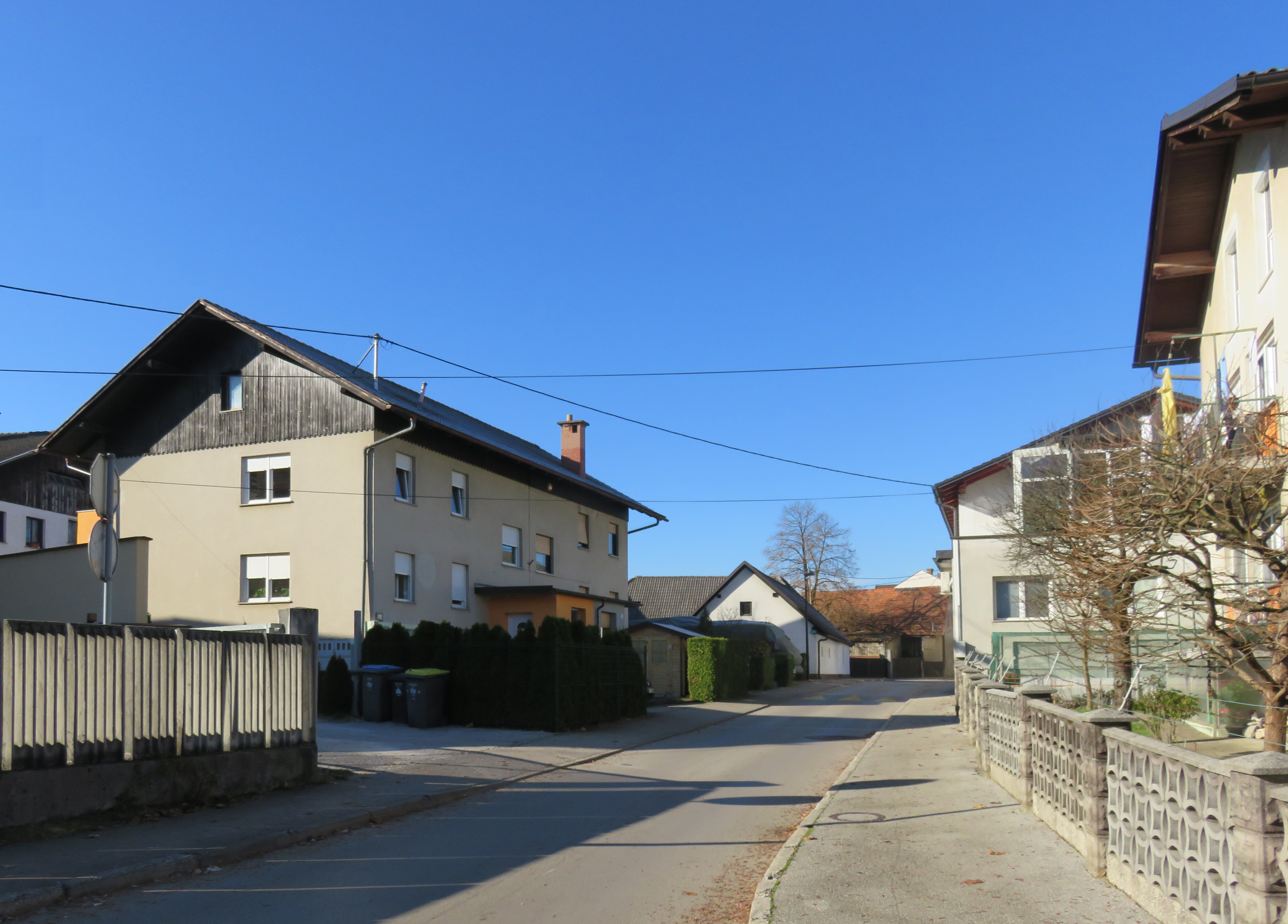

- Location in Slovenia
- Coordinates: 46°2′50.35″N 14°32′18.04″E
- Country: Slovenia
- Traditional region: Lower Carniola
- Statistical region: Central Slovenia
- Municipality: Ljubljana
- Elevation: 285 m (935 ft)

Štepanja Vas (pronounced [ʃtɛˈpaːnja ˈʋaːs]; in older sources also Štepana Vas, German: Stefansdorf) is a formerly independent settlement in the southeast part of the capital Ljubljana in central Slovenia. It belongs to the City Municipality of Ljubljana. It is part of the traditional region of Lower Carniola and is now included with the rest of the municipality in the Central Slovenia Statistical Region.

== Geography ==
Štepanja Vas, lying just across the Gruber Canal from Ljubljana's Kodeljevo neighborhood at the northern foot of Golovec Hill, is the first of the former traditional "subcolline villages" (Slovene: podhribske vasi) extending away from Ljubljana along the base of the hill. The old village core lies next to the canal, with newer construction extending north to the Ljubljanica River and south along the road to Dobrunje.

== Name ==
The name Štepanja vas literally means 'Stephen's village' and is derived from the local church, dedicated to Saint Stephen. In the past the German name was Stefansdorf.

== History ==
Štepanja Vas was first mentioned as a village in written sources in 1589. Štepanja Vas was annexed by the city of Ljubljana in 1953, ending its existence as an independent settlement.

== Church ==
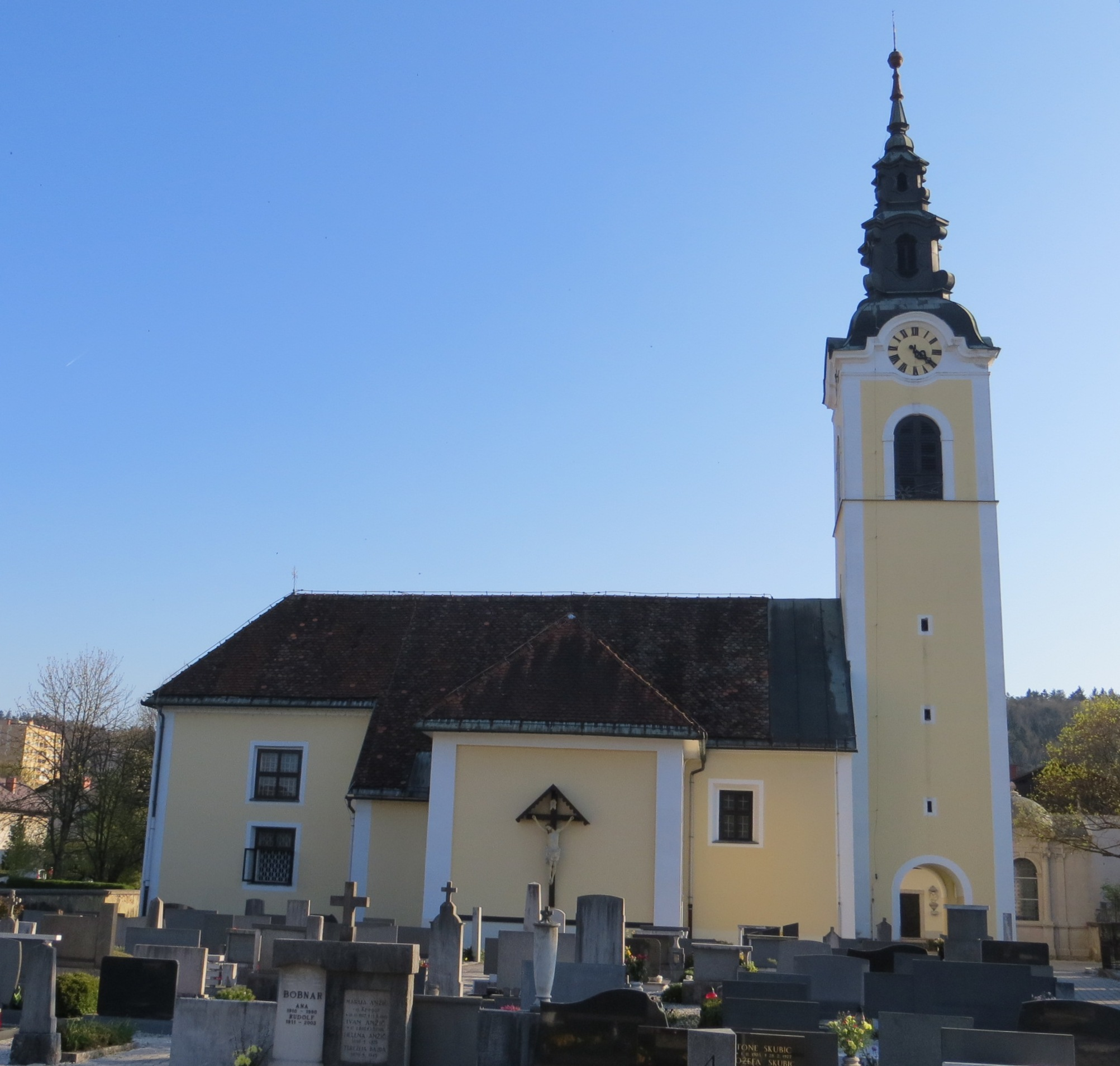
Saint Stephen's Church

The parish church in Štepanja Vas is dedicated to Saint Stephen. It was first mentioned in written sources in 1529. The current church was built in 1690 and, except for a new Baroque bell tower built in 1967, preserves its original appearance. The bell tower contains three bells; the oldest and heaviest bell dates to 1640, and two smaller ones to 1922. The chancel arch features a fresco of Saint Stephen painted in 1718 by Hans Michael Reinwalt. The painting of Saint Stephen on the main altar is an 1890 work by Jurij Šubic (1855–1890); it was created in Paris and was the artist's last work created for Slovenia. The ceilings of the Baroque side chapels were painted by Franc Jelovšek (1700–1764) and were renovated after the 1895 Ljubljana earthquake. Until the First World War, teamsters and other horse owners would make a pilgrimage to the church on Saint Stephen's Day and on Christmas, offering wax horses as votive offerings to invoke the saint's protection for their horses.

The cemetery in Štepanja Vas is known for its Holy Sepulcher shrine. The shrine was commissioned by Johannes Andreas Stemberg in 1753, as stated in the Latin inscription over the entrance. Functionally, it was the thirteenth station on a set of Stations of the Cross that Stemberg had constructed from what is now Ambrož Square (Slovene: Ambrožev trg) to Štepanja Vas. None of the other stations have survived. The Stations of the Cross functioned as a pilgrimage route for Ljubljana residents, especially on Sundays and religious feast days.

== Notable people ==
Notable people that were born or lived in Štepanja Vas include:

- Janko Lokar (1881–1963), literary historian and writer of hunting stories
