= Orle, Škofljica =

Orle
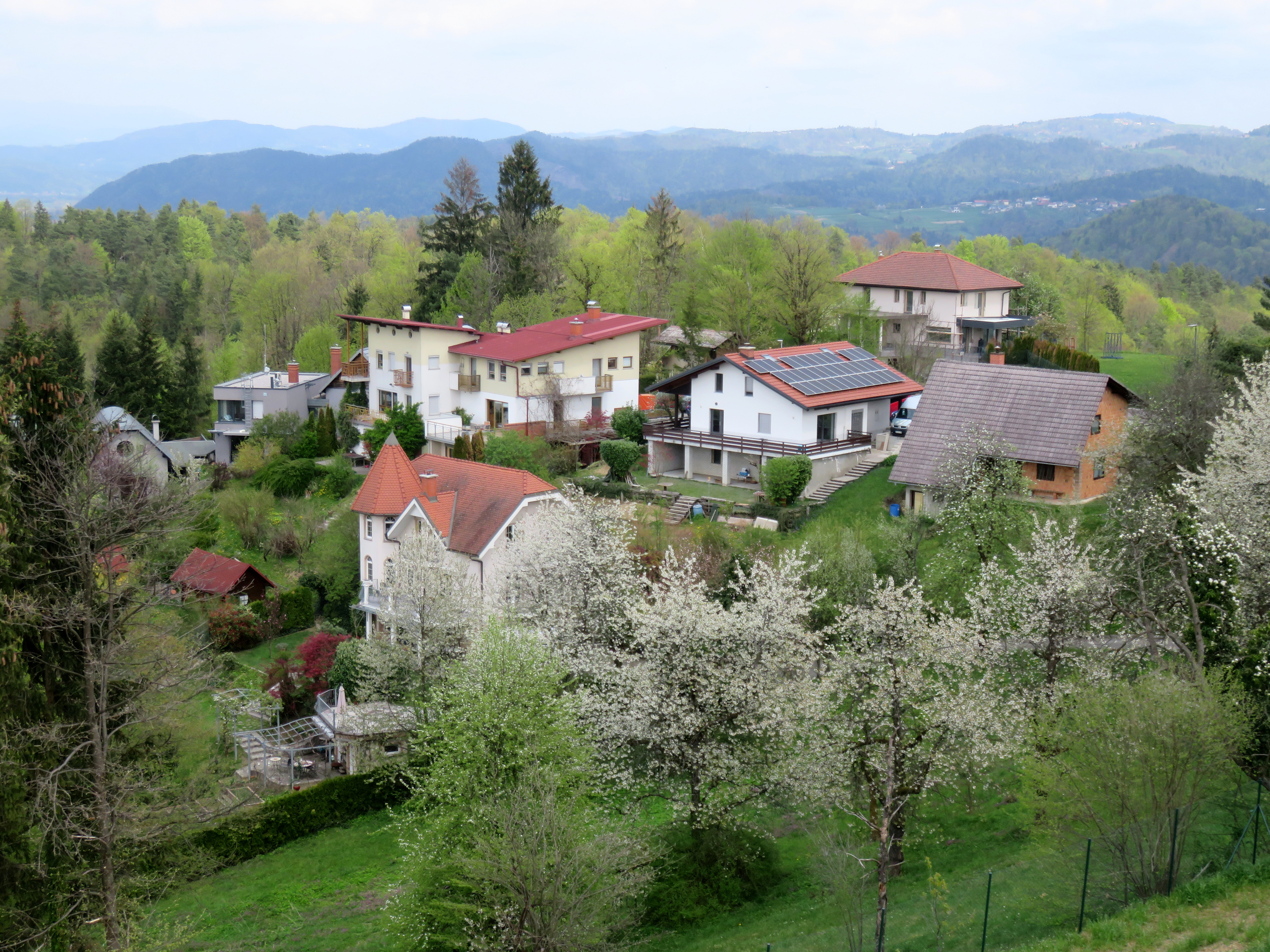

- Location in Slovenia
- Coordinates: 46°0′43.46″N 14°34′21.67″E
- Country: Slovenia
- Traditional region: Lower Carniola
- Statistical region: Central Slovenia
- Municipality: Škofljica

Area
  - Total: 1.78 km^{2} (0.69 sq mi)
- Elevation: 441.9 m (1,450 ft)

Population (2002)
  - Total: 195
- Postal code: 1291

Orle (pronounced [ˈoːɾlɛ]; in older sources also Orlje) is a settlement in central Slovenia. It lies in the hills southeast of the capital Ljubljana in the Municipality of Škofljica. The municipality is part of the traditional region of Lower Carniola and is now included in the Central Slovenia Statistical Region.

== Name ==
Orle was attested in historical sources as Orle in 1444, Arel in 1461, and Orll in 1496.
