= Preserje =

Preserje is the name of several settlements in Slovenia:

- Preserje, Municipality of Braslovče
- Preserje, Municipality of Brezovica
- Preserje, Municipality of Nova Gorica
- Preserje pri Komnu, Municipality of Komen
- Preserje pri Lukovici, Municipality of Lukovica
- Preserje pri Radomljah, Municipality of Domžale
- Preserje pri Zlatem Polju, Municipality of Lukovica
