= Podgorje pri Letušu =

- Location in Slovenia
- Coordinates: 46°19′11.16″N 15°0′36.48″E
- Country: Slovenia
- Traditional region: Styria
- Statistical region: Savinja
- Municipality: Braslovče

Area
  - Total: 2.83 km^{2} (1.09 sq mi)
- Elevation: 323.8 m (1,062 ft)

Population (2020)
  - Total: 64
  - Density: 23/km^{2} (59/sq mi)

Podgorje pri Letušu (pronounced [ˈpoːdɡɔɾjɛ pɾi lɛˈtuːʃu]) is a settlement in the Municipality of Braslovče in northern Slovenia. It lies on the right bank of the Savinja River west of Letuš under the Dobrovlje Hills. The area is part of the traditional region of Styria. The municipality is now included in the Savinja Statistical Region.

== Name ==
The name of the settlement was changed from Podgorje to Podgorje pri Letušu in 1953.
