= Podvrh, Braslovče =

Podvrh
- Location in Slovenia
- Coordinates: 46°18′19.33″N 15°1′14.33″E
- Country: Slovenia
- Traditional region: Styria
- Statistical region: Savinja
- Municipality: Braslovče

Area
  - Total: 9.96 km^{2} (3.85 sq mi)
- Elevation: 332.8 m (1,092 ft)

Population (2020)
  - Total: 422
  - Density: 42.4/km^{2} (110/sq mi)

Podvrh (pronounced [pɔˈdʋəɾx]) is a settlement in the Municipality of Braslovče in northern Slovenia. It lies at the foothills of the Dobrovlje Hills and includes a number of small hamlets, including Zgornji Podvrh, Srednji Podvrh, Spodnji Podvrh, Šmartno, Vrtoglav, Plavc, and Žovnek. The area is part of the traditional region of Styria. The municipality is now included in the Savinja Statistical Region.

Žovnek is best known for Žovnek Castle, a now ruined castle dating to the 12th to 17th centuries, which was the original home of the Counts of Celje.

Lake Žovnek, a reservoir created in 1978 to regulate flooding, is also a major feature of the landscape of Podvrh.
