= Grajska Vas =

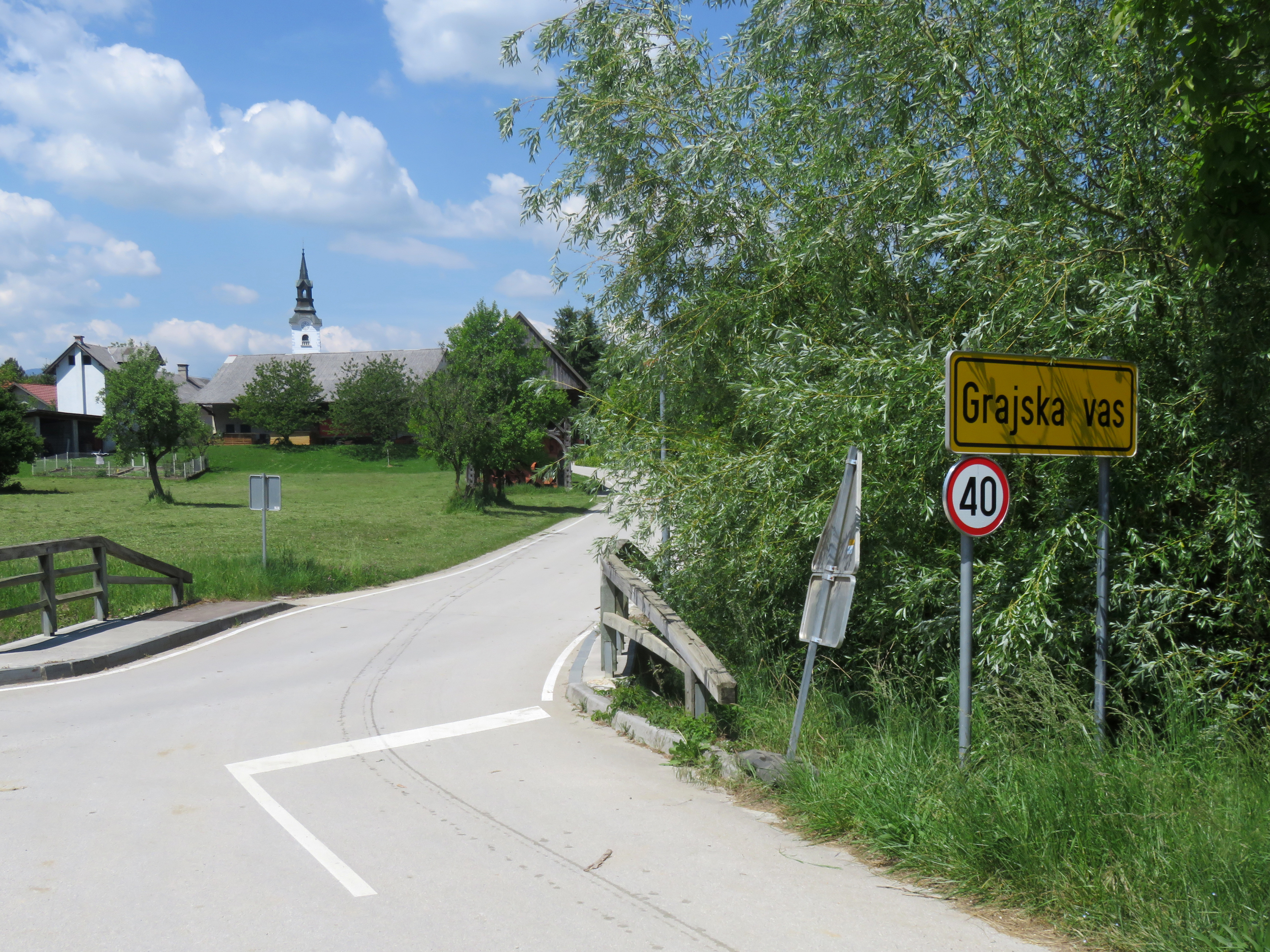

- Location in Slovenia
- Coordinates: 46°14′30.61″N 15°3′19.81″E
- Country: Slovenia
- Traditional region: Styria
- Statistical region: Savinja
- Municipality: Braslovče

Area
  - Total: 3.6 km^{2} (1.4 sq mi)
- Elevation: 287.1 m (942 ft)

Population (2020)
  - Total: 353
  - Density: 98/km^{2} (250/sq mi)

Grajska Vas (pronounced [ˈɡɾaːi̯ska ˈʋaːs]; Slovene: Grajska vas) is a village in the Municipality of Braslovče in northern Slovenia. The area is part of the traditional region of Styria. The municipality is now included in the Savinja Statistical Region.

== History ==
In December 2009, part of the settlement of Grajska Vas and part of the settlement of Šentrupert, both in the Municipality of Braslovče, merged with Kaplja Vas in the Municipality of Prebold, whereas one part of Kaplja Vas merged with Grajska Vas and another part with Šentrupert.

== Church ==
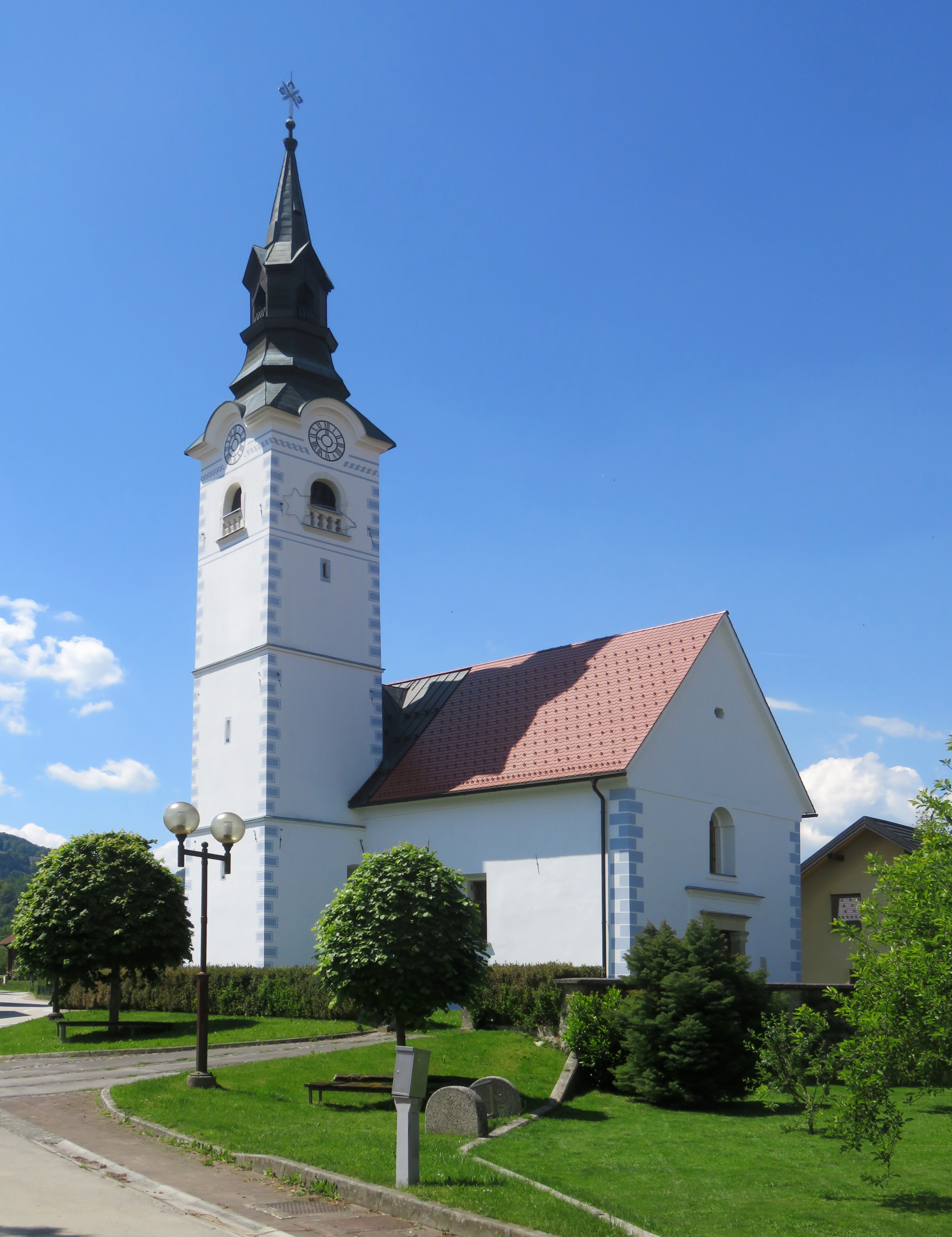
Saint Christopher's Church

The local church is dedicated to Saint Christopher and belongs to the Parish of Gomilsko. The original church was built in the 15th century, but the current building dates to the 17th and 18th centuries.
