= Kamence =

Kamence or Kamenče may refer to:

- Kamence, Brežice, small village in the Brežice Municipality in eastern Slovenia
- Kamence, Rogaška Slatina, a settlement in the Rogaška Slatina Municipality in eastern Slovenia
- Gorenje Kamence, settlement to the north of the town of Novo Mesto in southeastern Slovenia
- Kamenče, small settlement in the Braslovče municipality in northern Slovenia
