= Glinje =

Glinje may refer to:

- Glinje, Braslovče, in Slovenia
- Glinje, Cerklje na Gorenjskem, in Slovenia
- Glinje, a community in Ugljevik, Bosnia and Herzegovina
