= Šmatevž =

Šmatevž Sveti Matevž (until 1955)
- Location in Slovenia
- Coordinates: 46°15′33.8″N 15°2′14.03″E
- Country: Slovenia
- Traditional region: Styria
- Statistical region: Savinja
- Municipality: Braslovče

Area
  - Total: 1.31 km^{2} (0.51 sq mi)
- Elevation: 299.1 m (981 ft)

Population (2020)
  - Total: 197
  - Density: 150/km^{2} (389/sq mi)

Šmatevž (pronounced [ʃmaˈteːu̯ʃ]) is a small village in the Municipality of Braslovče in Slovenia. The area is part of the traditional region of Lower Styria. The municipality is now included in the Savinja Statistical Region.

== Name ==
The name of the settlement was changed from Sveti Matevž (literally, 'Saint Matthew') to Šmatevž in 1955. The name was changed on the basis of the 1948 Law on Names of Settlements and Designations of Squares, Streets, and Buildings as part of efforts by Slovenia's postwar communist government to remove religious elements from toponyms.

== Church ==
The local church, from which the settlement gets its name, is dedicated to Saint Matthew and belongs to the Parish of Gomilsko. It was originally a Gothic building. The belfry dates to the 16th century. It was extended and restyled in the 17th and 19th centuries.
