= Vrhe, Moravče =

Vrhe
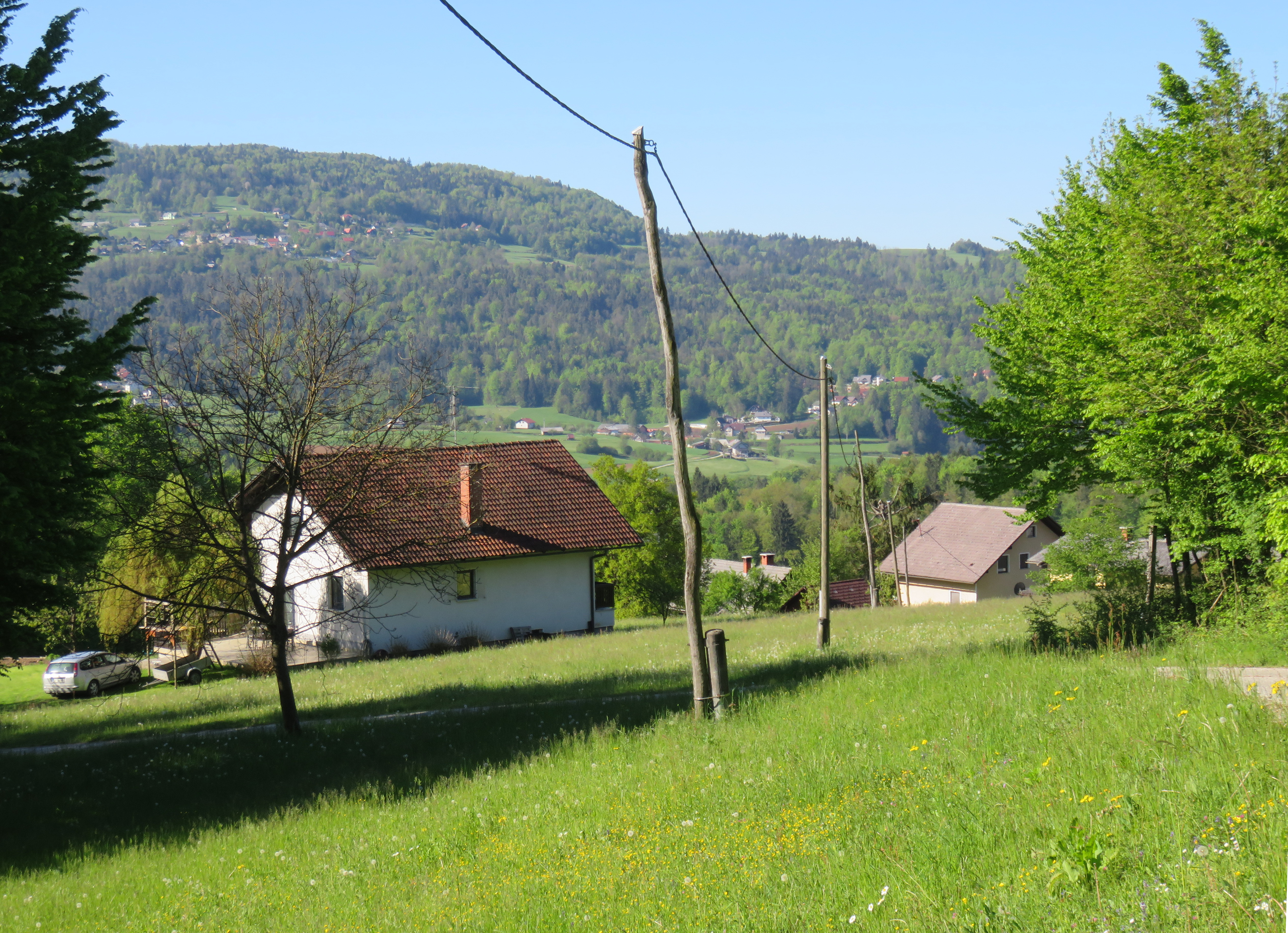

- Location in Slovenia
- Coordinates: 46°08′45″N 14°42′26″E
- Country: Slovenia
- Traditional region: Upper Carniola
- Statistical region: Central Slovenia
- Municipality: Lukovica, Moravče
- Elevation: 450 m (1,480 ft)

Vrhe (pronounced [ʋəɾˈxeː], in older sources Verh and Vrh; German: Werch) is a former village in central Slovenia mostly in the Municipality of Moravče and partly in the Municipality of Lukovica. It is now mostly part of the village of Imenje, but a few houses are part of Preserje pri Lukovici. It is part of the traditional region of Upper Carniola and is now included in the Central Slovenia Statistical Region.

== Geography ==
Vrhe is a scattered settlement northeast of the main part of Imenje and south of the main part of Preserje pri Lukovici.

== Name ==
The name Vrhe is derived from the common noun vrh 'peak, summit, highest point', referring to the geographical location of the settlement. It is originally an accusative masculine plural form that was reanalyzed as a nominative feminine plural.

== History ==
Vrhe had a population of 38 (in seven houses) in 1880, and 19 (in four houses) in 1900. Vrhe was annexed by Imenje and Preserje pri Lukovici in 1952, ending its existence as a separate settlement.
