= Trnava, Braslovče =

Trnava
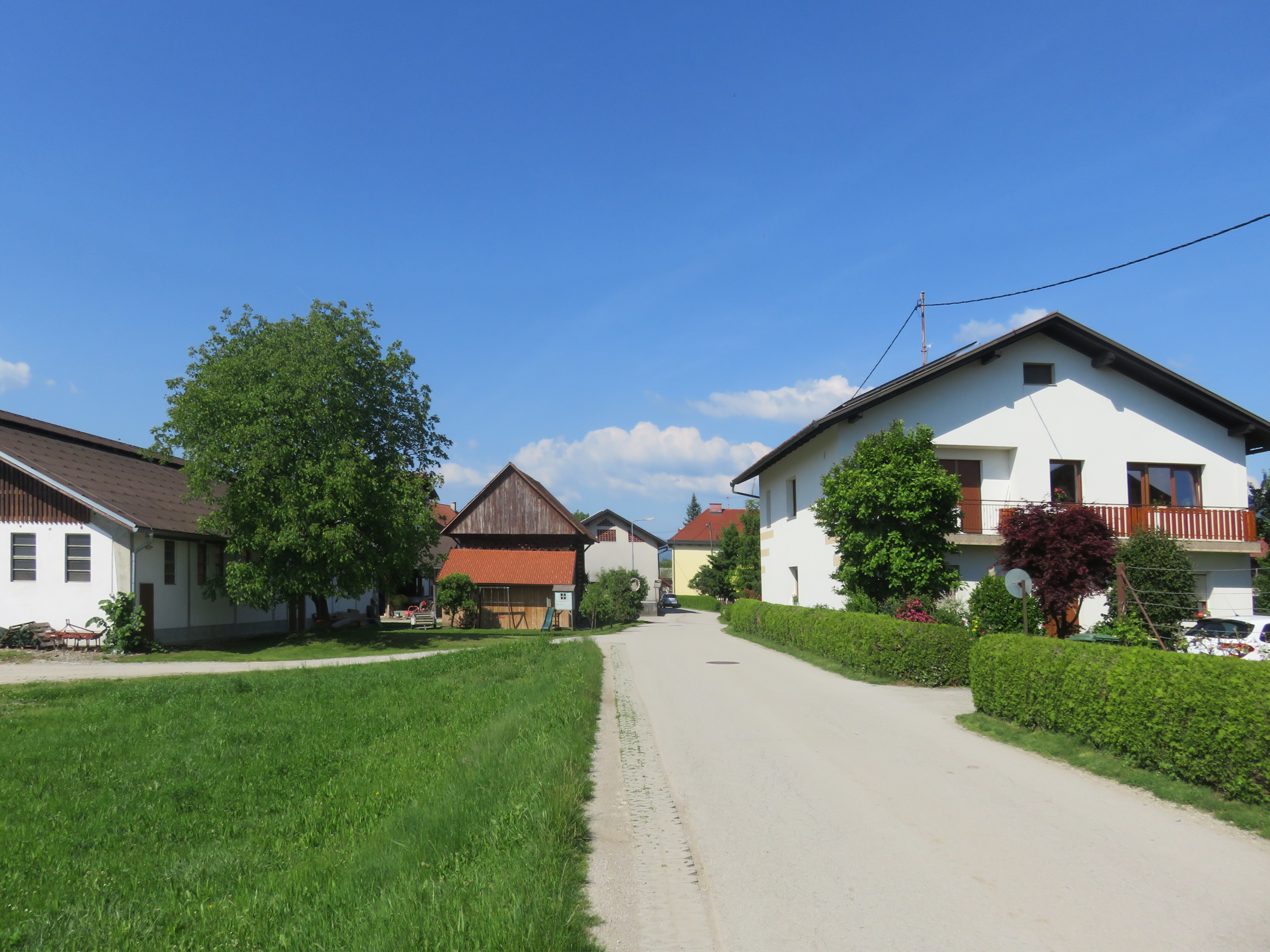

- Location in Slovenia
- Coordinates: 46°15′17.88″N 15°3′57.22″E
- Country: Slovenia
- Traditional region: Styria
- Statistical region: Savinja
- Municipality: Braslovče

Area
  - Total: 2.19 km^{2} (0.85 sq mi)
- Elevation: 280.6 m (921 ft)

Population (2020)
  - Total: 278
  - Density: 127/km^{2} (329/sq mi)

Trnava (pronounced [təɾˈnaːʋa]) is a settlement in the Municipality of Braslovče in Slovenia. It lies just north of Šentrupert. The A1 motorway crosses the settlement's territory just north of the village core. The area is part of the traditional region of Styria. The municipality is now included in the Savinja Statistical Region.

A middle La Tène culture site has been partially investigated near the settlement.
