= Žovnek Castle =

Coordinates: 46°16′34.72″N 15°0′13.12″E

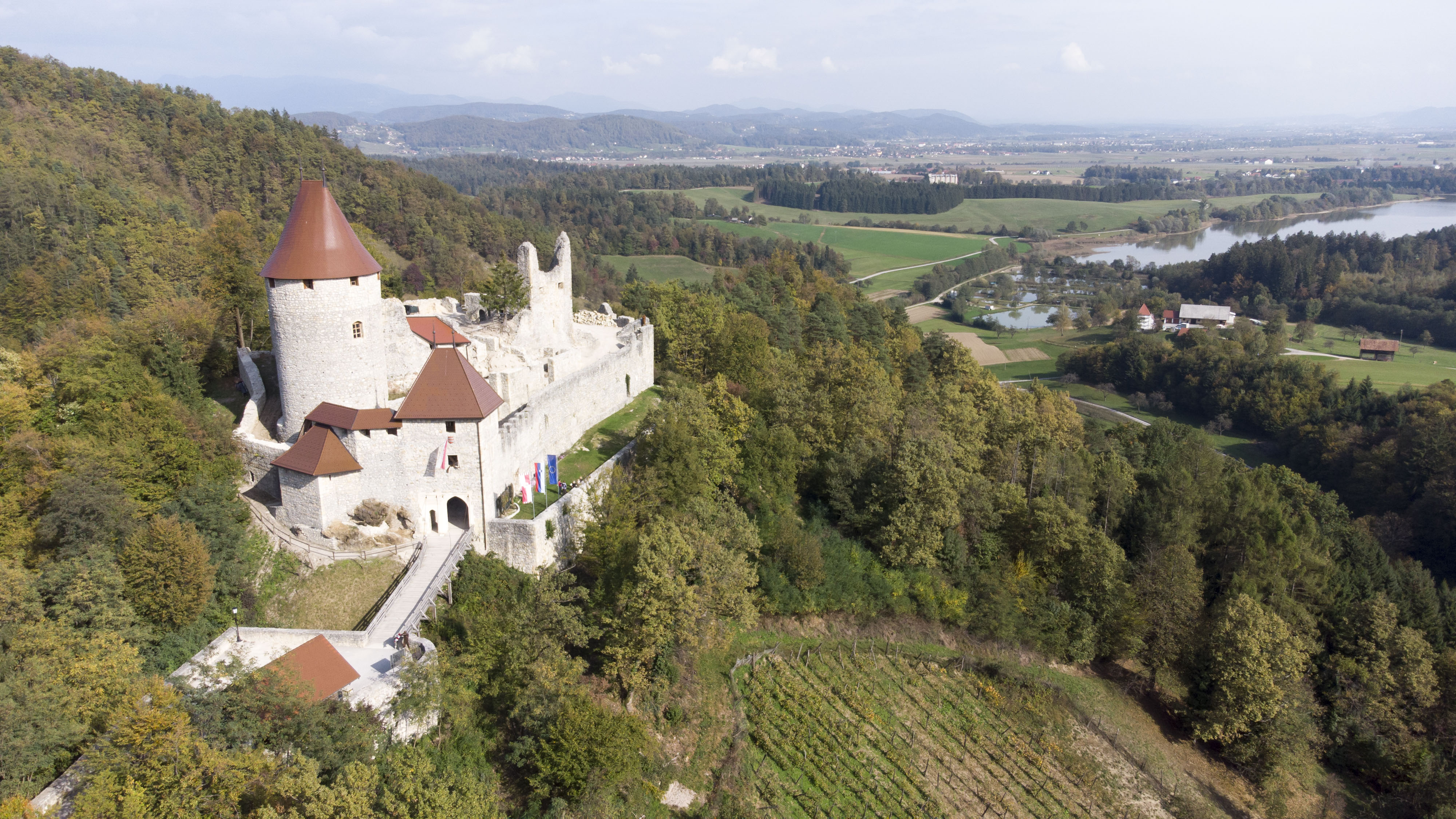
Žovnek Castle, with Lake Žovnek below

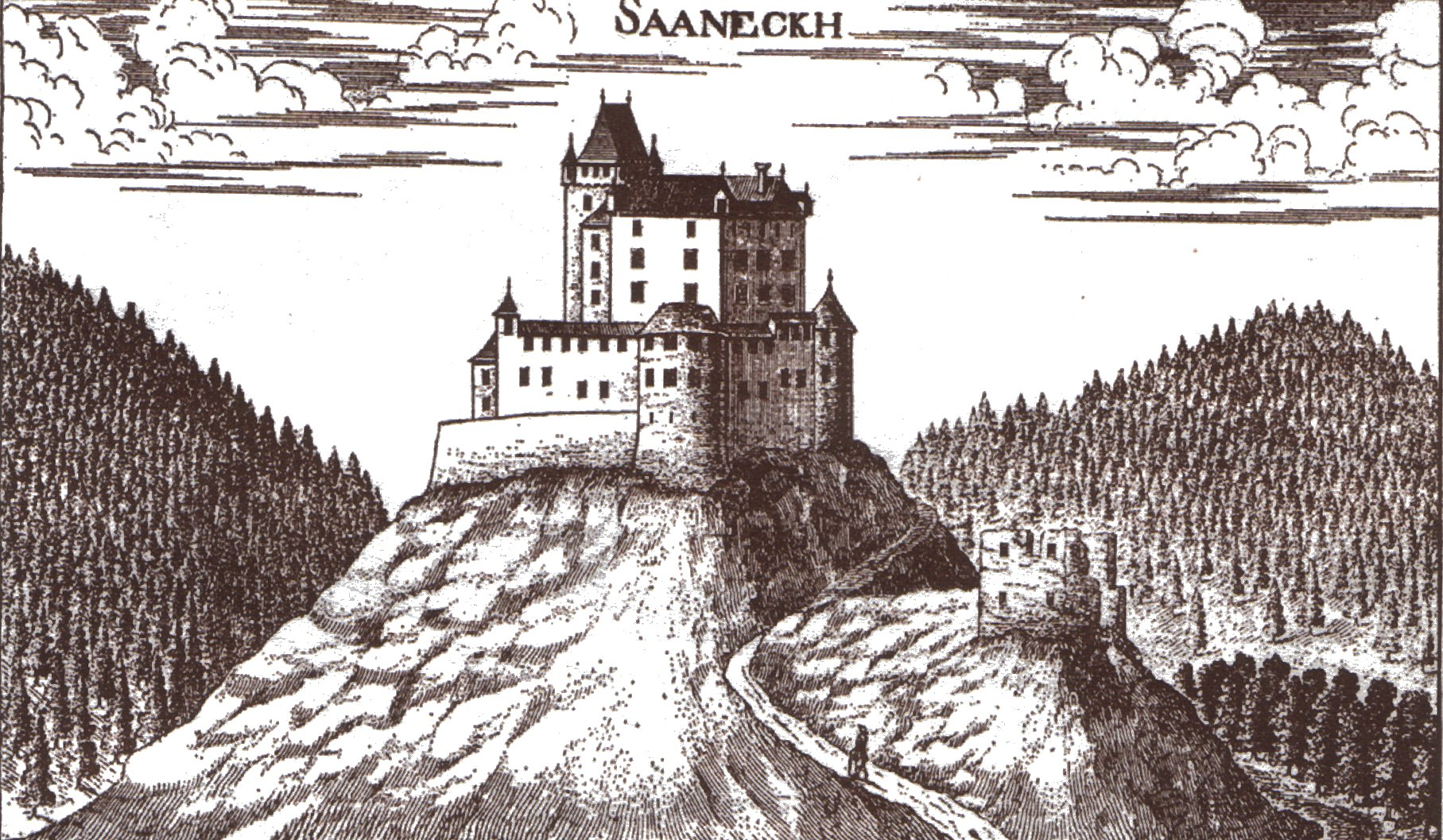
Žovnek Castle, Georg Matthäus Vischer, Topographia Ducatus Stiriae, Graz 1681

Žovnek Castle (Slovene: Žovnek, German: Sanneck) is a castle northeast of Braslovče, Slovenia. It lies above Lake Žovnek. The Lords of Žovnek, later Counts of Celje, were named after the castle. The castle was first mentioned in 1278 as Castrum Sevnekke, and later as Sannegg.
