= Poljče, Braslovče =

Poljče
- Location in Slovenia
- Coordinates: 46°16′10.38″N 15°3′3.57″E
- Country: Slovenia
- Traditional region: Styria
- Statistical region: Savinja
- Municipality: Braslovče

Area
  - Total: 0.69 km^{2} (0.27 sq mi)
- Elevation: 286.6 m (940 ft)

Population (2020)
  - Total: 62
  - Density: 90/km^{2} (230/sq mi)

Poljče (pronounced [ˈpoːltʃɛ]) is a small settlement in the Municipality of Braslovče in northern Slovenia. It lies on the flatlands on the right bank of the Savinja River south of Parižlje. The area is part of the traditional region of Styria. The municipality is now included in the Savinja Statistical Region.
