= Male Braslovče =

- Location in Slovenia
- Coordinates: 46°17′55.66″N 15°2′30.02″E
- Country: Slovenia
- Traditional region: Styria
- Statistical region: Savinja
- Municipality: Braslovče

Area
  - Total: 1.39 km^{2} (0.54 sq mi)
- Elevation: 302.7 m (993 ft)

Population (2020)
  - Total: 266
  - Density: 191/km^{2} (496/sq mi)

Male Braslovče (pronounced [ˈmaːlɛ ˈbɾaːslɔu̯tʃɛ]) is a settlement on the right bank of the Savinja River north of Braslovče in northern Slovenia. The area is part of the traditional region of Styria. The Municipality of Braslovče is now included in the Savinja Statistical Region.
