= Podvrh =

Podvrh may refer to the following places in Slovenia:

- Podvrh, Braslovče
- Podvrh, Gorenja Vas–Poljane
- Podvrh, Osilnica
- Podvrh, Sevnica
