= Municipality of Braslovče =

Municipality of Slovenia

Municipality of Braslovče Občina Braslovče
- Municipality
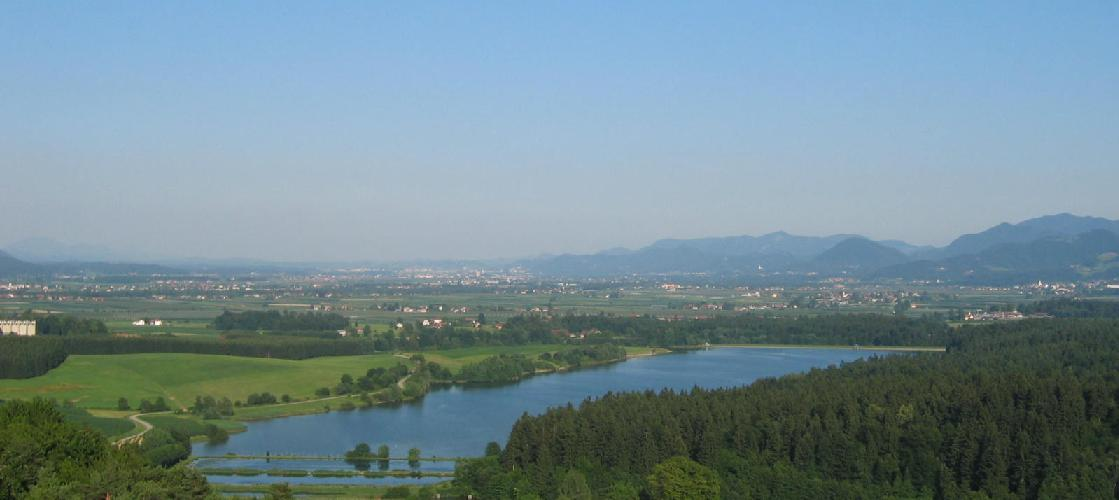

- Flag Seal Coat of arms

- Location of the Municipality of Braslovče in Slovenia
- Coordinates: 46°17′N 15°02′E
- Country: Slovenia

Government
  - Mayor: Tomaž Žohar (Independent)

Area
  - Total: 55 km^{2} (21 sq mi)

Population (2012)
  - Total: 5,417
  - Density: 98/km^{2} (260/sq mi)
- Time zone: UTC+01 (CET)
  - Summer (DST): UTC+02 (CEST)
- Website: www.braslovce.si
- Source: Statistical Office of the Republic of Slovenia, census of 2002.

The Municipality of Braslovče (pronounced [ˈbɾaːslɔu̯tʃɛ]; Slovene: Občina Braslovče) is a municipality in northern Slovenia. The seat of the municipality is the town of Braslovče. Most of the municipality, with the exception of the northern part of the village of Letuš, lies on the right bank of the Savinja River. The area is part of the traditional region of Styria. It is now included in the Savinja Statistical Region.

== Settlements ==
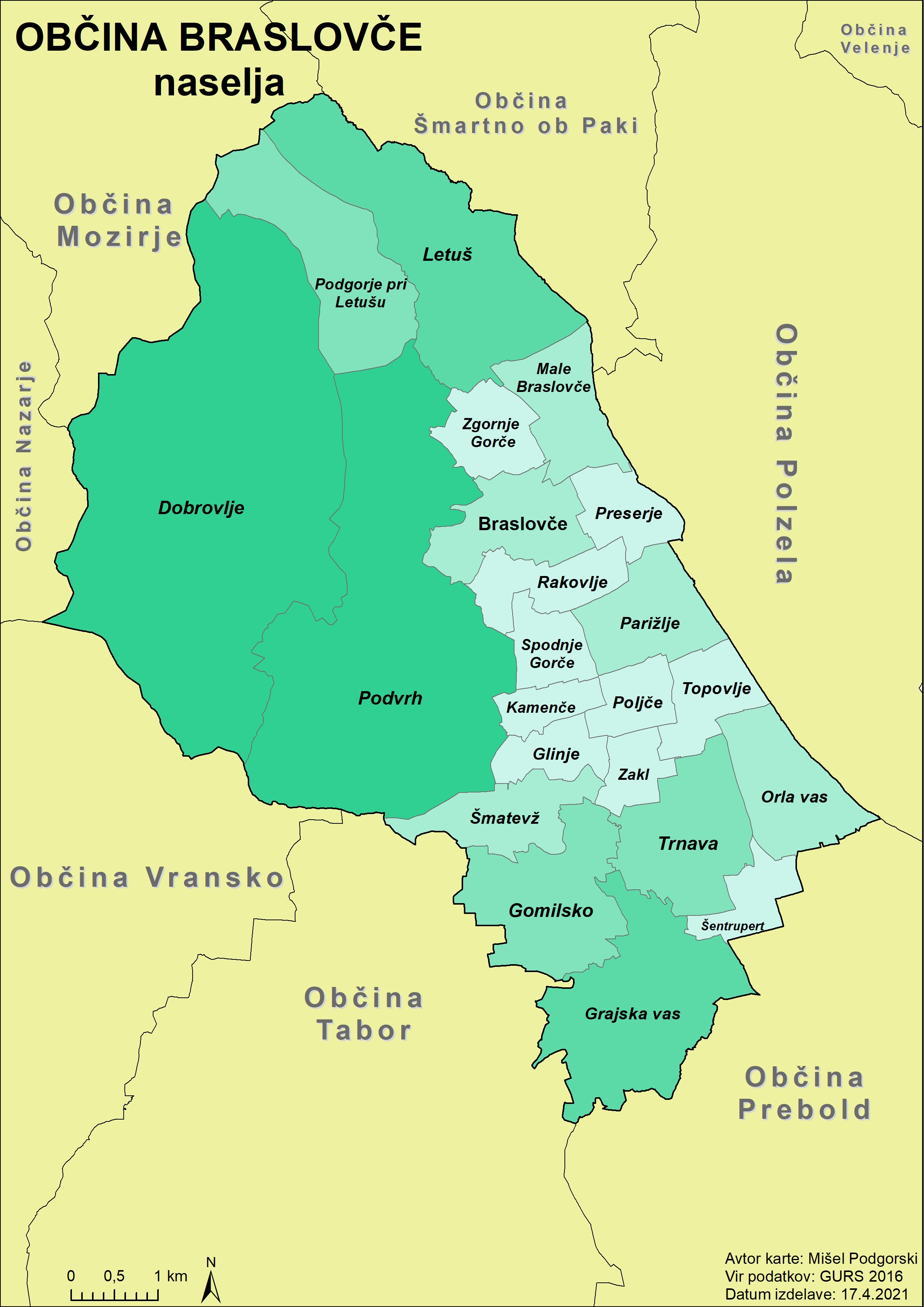
Villages in the municipality

In addition to the municipal seat of Braslovče, the municipality also includes the following settlements:

- Dobrovlje
- Glinje
- Gomilsko
- Grajska Vas
- Kamenče
- Letuš
- Male Braslovče
- Orla Vas
- Parižlje
- Podgorje pri Letušu
- Podvrh
- Poljče
- Preserje
- Rakovlje
- Šentrupert
- Šmatevž
- Spodnje Gorče
- Topovlje
- Trnava
- Zakl
- Zgornje Gorče
