= Zakl, Braslovče =

Zakl
- Location in Slovenia
- Coordinates: 46°15′45.11″N 15°3′14.28″E
- Country: Slovenia
- Traditional region: Styria
- Statistical region: Savinja
- Municipality: Braslovče

Area
  - Total: 0.59 km^{2} (0.23 sq mi)
- Elevation: 283.5 m (930 ft)

Population (2020)
  - Total: 52
  - Density: 88/km^{2} (230/sq mi)

Zakl (pronounced [ˈzaːkəl]) is a small settlement in the Municipality of Braslovče in Slovenia. The area is part of the traditional region of Lower Styria. The Municipality of Braslovče is now included in the Savinja Statistical Region.

== Name ==
Zakl was attested in written sources in 1383 as Czokel (and as Sakel in 1419, Sakell in 1436, Sakl in 1465, and Sorkell in 1480). The name is derived from the fused prepositional phrase *za kъlъ (literally, 'behind the tooth, behind the tusk') in which the second element has a metaphorical meaning, referring to a piece of land that extends into another geographical feature (cf. Ukrainian закло 'parcel of land extending into another'). Locally, the name is pronounced Zaku.
