= Spodnje Gorče =

- Location in Slovenia
- Coordinates: 46°16′38.9″N 15°2′21.55″E
- Country: Slovenia
- Traditional region: Styria
- Statistical region: Savinja
- Municipality: Braslovče

Area
  - Total: 0.76 km^{2} (0.29 sq mi)
- Elevation: 298.6 m (980 ft)

Population (2020)
  - Total: 80
  - Density: 110/km^{2} (270/sq mi)

Spodnje Gorče (pronounced [ˈspoːdnjɛ ˈɡoːɾtʃɛ]) is a small village in the Municipality of Braslovče in Slovenia. The area is part of the traditional region of Styria. The municipality is now included in the Savinja Statistical Region.
