= Topovlje =

- Location in Slovenia
- Coordinates: 46°16′18.45″N 15°3′53.55″E
- Country: Slovenia
- Traditional region: Styria
- Statistical region: Savinja
- Municipality: Braslovče

Area
  - Total: 0.98 km^{2} (0.38 sq mi)
- Elevation: 288.4 m (946 ft)

Population (2020)
  - Total: 115
  - Density: 120/km^{2} (300/sq mi)

Topovlje (pronounced [tɔˈpoːu̯ljɛ]) is a settlement on the right bank of the Savinja River in the Municipality of Braslovče in Slovenia. The area is part of the traditional region of Lower Styria. The municipality is now included in the Savinja Statistical Region.

A small simple roadside chapel-shrine in the settlement dates to the third quarter of the 19th century.
