= Zgornje Gorče =

- Location in Slovenia
- Coordinates: 46°17′54.05″N 15°2′2.92″E
- Country: Slovenia
- Traditional region: Styria
- Statistical region: Savinja
- Municipality: Braslovče

Area
  - Total: 1 km^{2} (0.39 sq mi)
- Elevation: 306.8 m (1,007 ft)

Population (2020)
  - Total: 81
  - Density: 81/km^{2} (210/sq mi)

Zgornje Gorče (pronounced [ˈzɡoːɾnjɛ ˈɡoːɾtʃɛ]) is a settlement in the Lower Savinja Valley in the Municipality of Braslovče in Slovenia. The area is part of the traditional region of Styria. The municipality is now included in the Savinja Statistical Region.
