= Rakovlje =

- Location in Slovenia
- Coordinates: 46°17′3.19″N 15°2′28.58″E
- Country: Slovenia
- Traditional region: Styria
- Statistical region: Savinja
- Municipality: Braslovče

Area
  - Total: 1.07 km^{2} (0.41 sq mi)
- Elevation: 297 m (974 ft)

Population (2020)
  - Total: 449
  - Density: 420/km^{2} (1,090/sq mi)

Rakovlje (pronounced [ɾaˈkoːu̯ljɛ]) is a settlement in the Municipality of Braslovče in Slovenia. The area is part of the traditional region of Styria. The municipality is now included in the Savinja Statistical Region.

A small roadside chapel-shrine in the settlement dates to the early 20th century.
