= Orla Vas =

- Location in Slovenia
- Coordinates: 46°15′42.15″N 15°4′37.87″E
- Country: Slovenia
- Traditional region: Styria
- Statistical region: Savinja
- Municipality: Braslovče

Area
  - Total: 1.68 km^{2} (0.65 sq mi)
- Elevation: 282.8 m (928 ft)

Population (2020)
  - Total: 207
  - Density: 123/km^{2} (319/sq mi)

Orla Vas (pronounced [ˈoːɾla ˈʋaːs]; Slovene: Orla vas) is a small village in the Municipality of Braslovče in northern Slovenia. It lies on the right bank of the Savinja River. The A1 motorway runs just south of the settlement. The area is part of the traditional region of Styria. The municipality is now included in the Savinja Statistical Region.
