= Kamenče =

- Location in Slovenia
- Coordinates: 46°16′14.61″N 15°2′13.13″E
- Country: Slovenia
- Traditional region: Styria
- Statistical region: Savinja
- Municipality: Braslovče

Area
  - Total: 0.53 km^{2} (0.20 sq mi)
- Elevation: 290 m (950 ft)

Population (2020)
  - Total: 199
  - Density: 380/km^{2} (970/sq mi)

Kamenče (pronounced [kaˈmeːntʃɛ]) is a small settlement in the Municipality of Braslovče in northern Slovenia. It lies just east of Lake Žovnek. The area is part of the traditional region of Styria. The Municipality of Braslovče is now included in the Savinja Statistical Region.
