= Parižlje =

- Location in Slovenia
- Coordinates: 46°16′57.33″N 15°3′36.32″E
- Country: Slovenia
- Traditional region: Styria
- Statistical region: Savinja
- Municipality: Braslovče

Area
  - Total: 1.51 km^{2} (0.58 sq mi)
- Elevation: 290.3 m (952 ft)

Population (2020)
  - Total: 711
  - Density: 471/km^{2} (1,220/sq mi)

Parižlje (pronounced [paˈɾiːʒljɛ]) is a settlement in the Municipality of Braslovče in northern Slovenia. It lies on the right bank of the Savinja River, opposite Polzela. The area is part of the traditional region of Styria. The municipality is now included in the Savinja Statistical Region.

A round roadside chapel-shrine in the settlement dates to 1938.
