= Letuš =

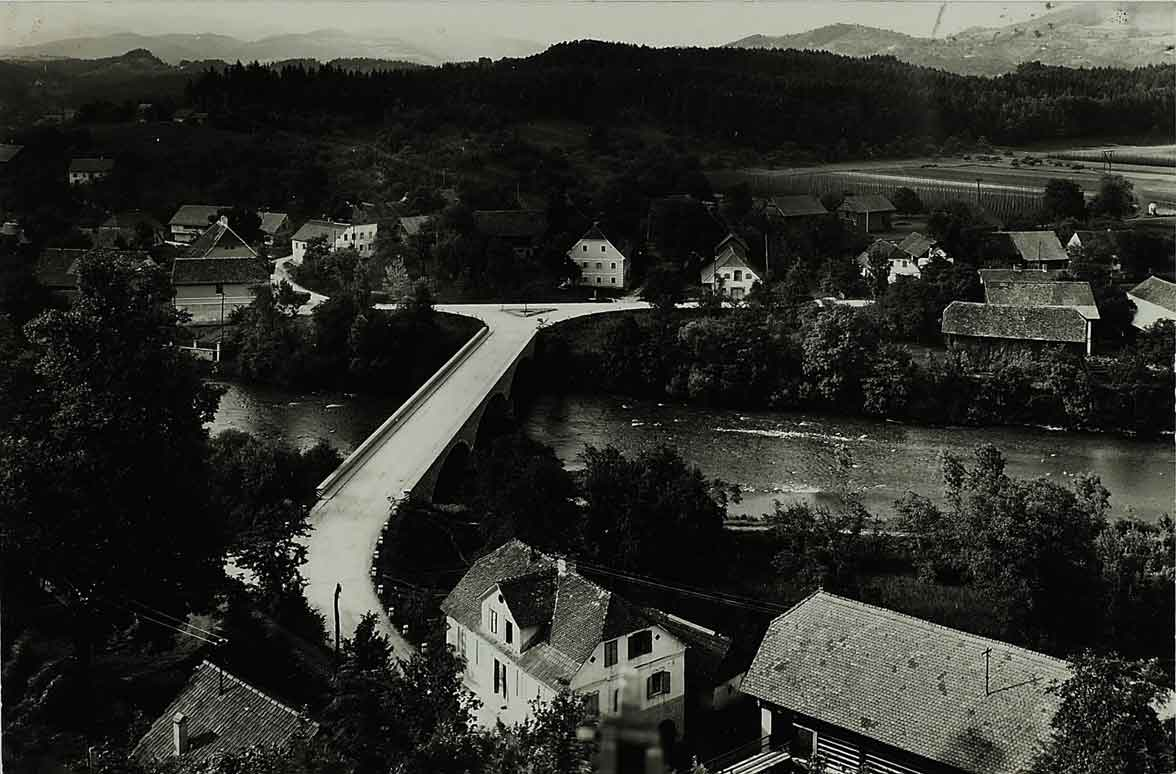
- 1958 postcards of Letuš

- Location in Slovenia
- Coordinates: 46°18′59.49″N 15°1′30.71″E
- Country: Slovenia
- Traditional region: Styria
- Statistical region: Savinja
- Municipality: Braslovče

Area
  - Total: 4.72 km^{2} (1.82 sq mi)
- Elevation: 317 m (1,040 ft)

Population (2020)
  - Total: 887
  - Density: 188/km^{2} (487/sq mi)

Letuš (pronounced [lɛˈtuːʃ]) is a village in the Municipality of Braslovče in northern Slovenia. It lies on both banks of the Savinja River north of Braslovče. The area is part of the traditional region of Styria. The municipality is now included in the Savinja Statistical Region.

== Name ==
Letuš was attested in written sources in 1340 as Lieccz and Liwz (and as Leutsa in 1350, Lewcz in 1457, and Lewtsch in 1419, among other forms). Despite some accentual and phonological complications, the Slovene name is believed to be borrowed from a Middle High German form based on lîthûs 'tavern' (< Middle High German lît 'distilled drink' + hûs 'house'). The monastery in Gornji Grad formerly had a ferry and tavern in Letuš.

== Church ==
The local church is dedicated to Saint John the Baptist and belongs to the Parish of Braslovče. It dates to the 16th century with 18th- and 19th-century restyling.
