= Preserje, Braslovče =

Preserje
- Location in Slovenia
- Coordinates: 46°17′21.64″N 15°3′8.31″E
- Country: Slovenia
- Traditional region: Styria
- Statistical region: Savinja
- Municipality: Braslovče

Area
  - Total: 0.9 km^{2} (0.35 sq mi)
- Elevation: 296 m (971 ft)

Population (2020)
  - Total: 104

Preserje (pronounced [ˈpɾeːsɛɾjɛ]) is a small settlement in the Municipality of Braslovče in northern Slovenia. It lies on the Savinja River just east of Braslovče. The area is part of the traditional region of Lower Styria. The municipality is now included in the Savinja Statistical Region.
