= Šentrupert, Braslovče =

Šentrupert Sveti Rupert (until 1955)
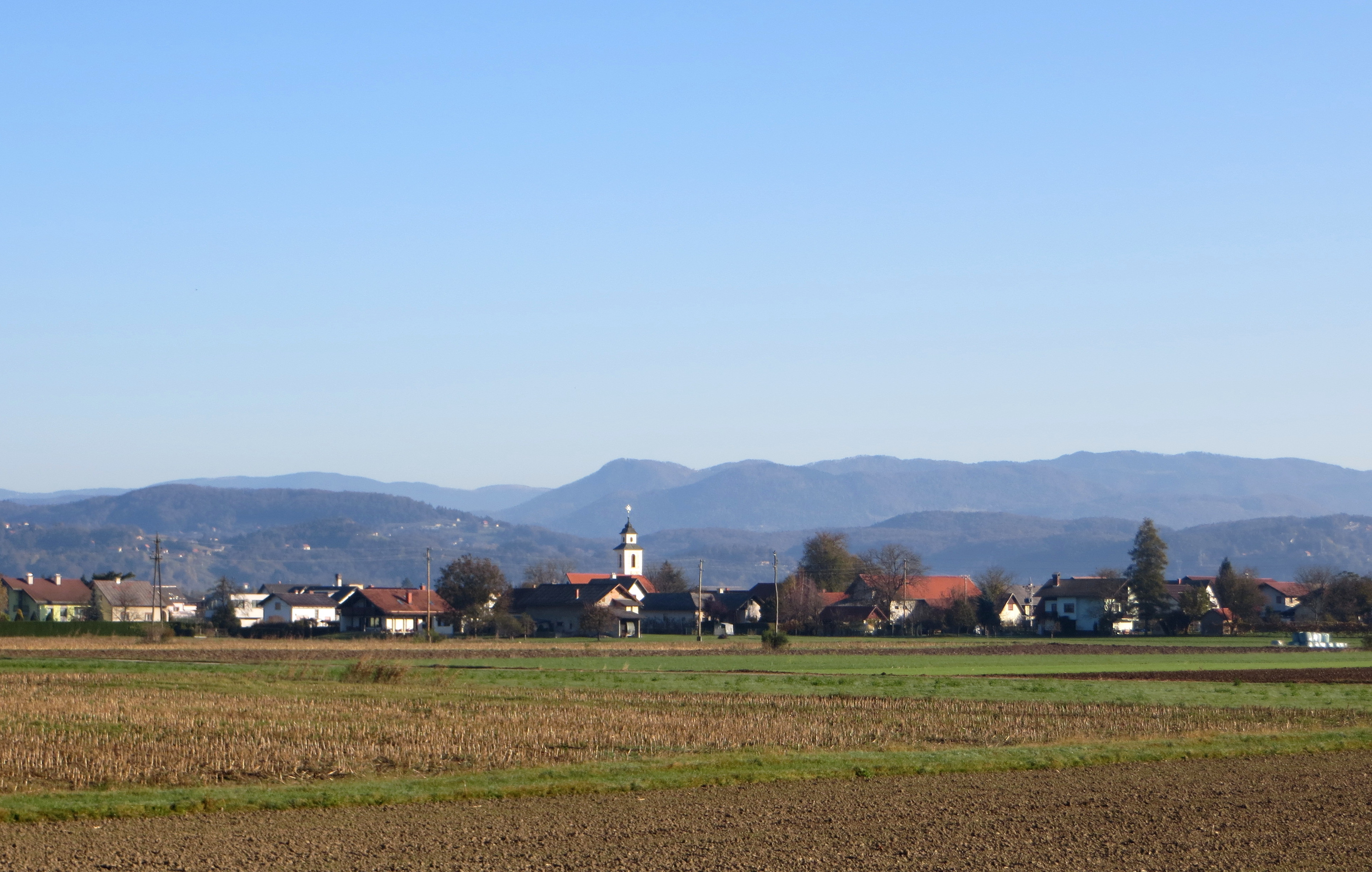

- Location in Slovenia
- Coordinates: 46°15′0.37″N 15°4′27.54″E
- Country: Slovenia
- Traditional region: Styria
- Statistical region: Savinja
- Municipality: Braslovče

Area
  - Total: 0.7 km^{2} (0.27 sq mi)
- Elevation: 279.4 m (917 ft)

Population (2020)
  - Total: 156
  - Density: 220/km^{2} (580/sq mi)

Šentrupert (pronounced [ʃɛnˈtɾúːpɛɾt, - ʃənˈ-]) is a settlement in the Municipality of Braslovče in Slovenia. The area is part of the traditional region of Lower Styria. The municipality is now included in the Savinja Statistical Region.

== Name ==
The name of the settlement was changed from Sveti Rupert (literally, 'Saint Rupert') to Šentrupert in 1955. The name was changed on the basis of the 1948 Law on Names of Settlements and Designations of Squares, Streets, and Buildings as part of efforts by Slovenia's postwar communist government to remove religious elements from toponyms.

== Church ==
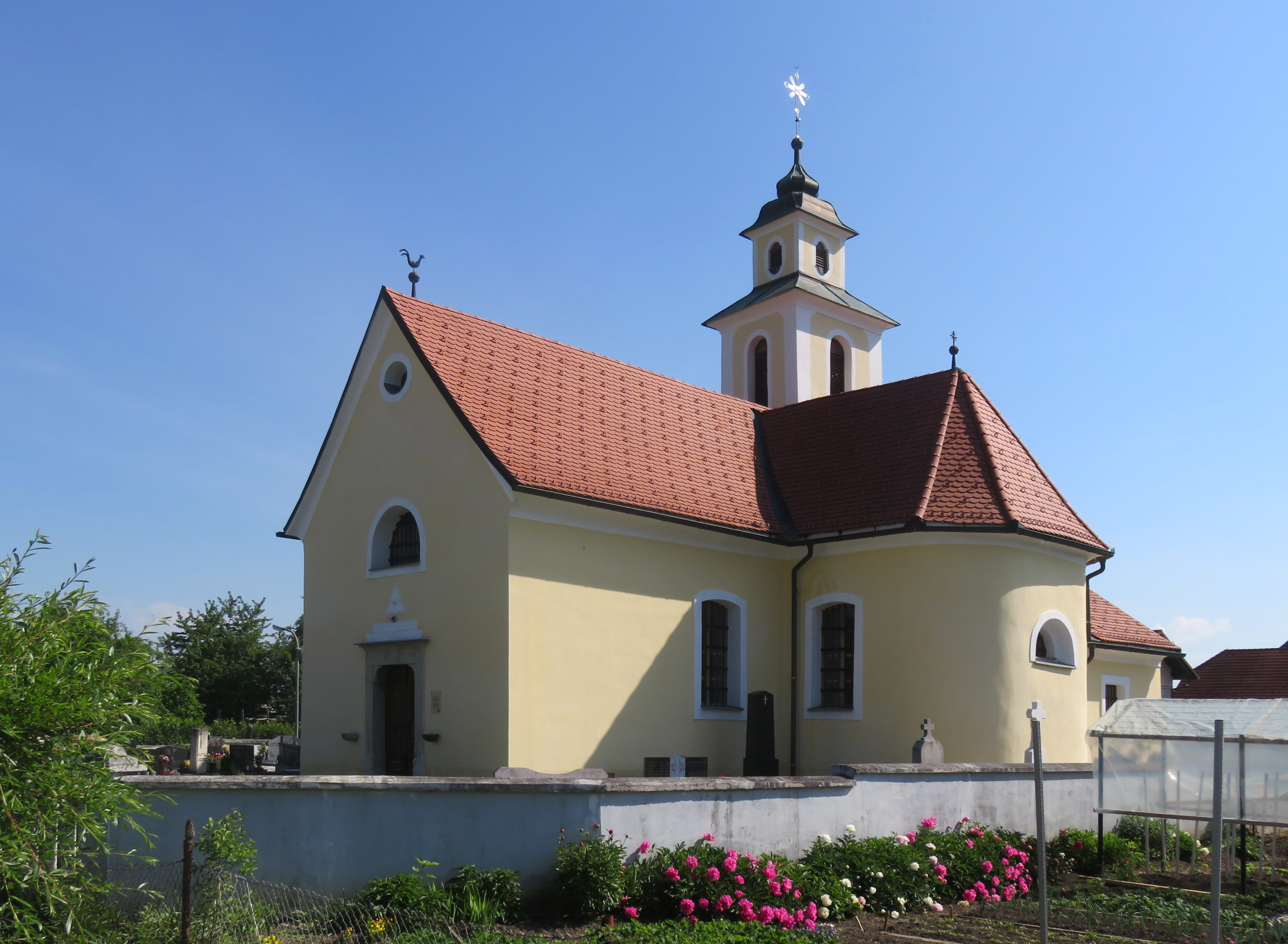
Saint Rupert's Church

The local church from which the settlement gets its name is dedicated to Saint Rupert and belongs to the Parish of Gomilsko. It was built in the 14th century with 18th- and 19th-century additions.
