= Preserje pri Zlatem Polju =

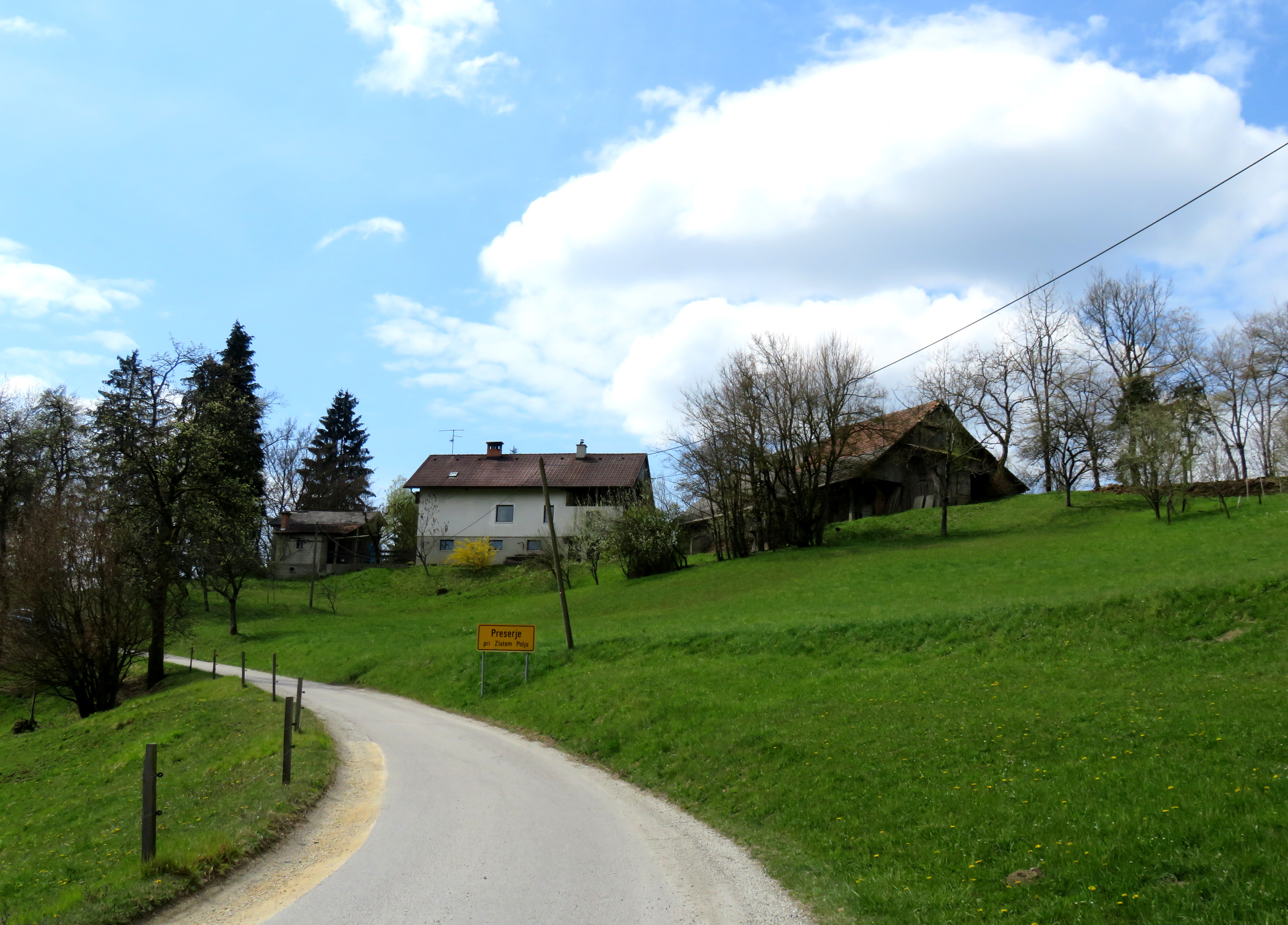

- Location in Slovenia
- Coordinates: 46°11′32.03″N 14°41′38.35″E
- Country: Slovenia
- Traditional region: Upper Carniola
- Statistical region: Central Slovenia
- Municipality: Lukovica

Area
  - Total: 0.93 km^{2} (0.36 sq mi)
- Elevation: 562.4 m (1,845 ft)

Population (2010)
  - Total: 31

Preserje pri Zlatem Polju (pronounced [preˈsɛːrjɛ pri ˈzlaːtɛm ˈpoːlju]) is a small settlement in the hills north of Lukovica pri Domžalah in the eastern part of the Upper Carniola region of Slovenia.
