= Kamence, Brežice =

Kamence
- Location in Slovenia
- Coordinates: 45°50′56.05″N 15°33′26.57″E
- Country: Slovenia
- Traditional region: Lower Carniola
- Statistical region: Lower Sava
- Municipality: Brežice

Area
  - Total: 0.62 km^{2} (0.24 sq mi)
- Elevation: 382.1 m (1,254 ft)

Population (2020)
  - Total: 11
  - Density: 18/km^{2} (46/sq mi)

Kamence (pronounced [ˈkaːmɛntsɛ]; in older sources also Kamenica) is a small village in the Municipality of Brežice in eastern Slovenia. It lies on the eastern slopes of the Gorjanci Mountains, close to the border with Croatia. The area is part of the traditional region of Lower Carniola. It is now included in the Lower Sava Statistical Region.

The remoteness of the settlement has contributed to the fact that it has preserved its character, with typical mid-19th-century rural architecture including rectangular stone and wooden houses as well as original outbuildings such as barns, granaries, and hayracks. As such, the entire village has been declared a monument of cultural heritage by the Slovenian Ministry of Culture.
