= Glinje, Braslovče =

Glinje
- Location in Slovenia
- Coordinates: 46°15′58.41″N 15°2′25.26″E
- Country: Slovenia
- Traditional region: Styria
- Statistical region: Savinja
- Municipality: Braslovče

Area
  - Total: 0.71 km^{2} (0.27 sq mi)
- Elevation: 293.2 m (962 ft)

Population (2020)
  - Total: 54
  - Density: 76/km^{2} (200/sq mi)

Glinje (pronounced [ˈɡliːnjɛ]) is a small settlement in the Municipality of Braslovče in northern Slovenia. The area is part of the traditional region of Styria. The municipality is now included in the Savinja Statistical Region.
