= Braslovče =

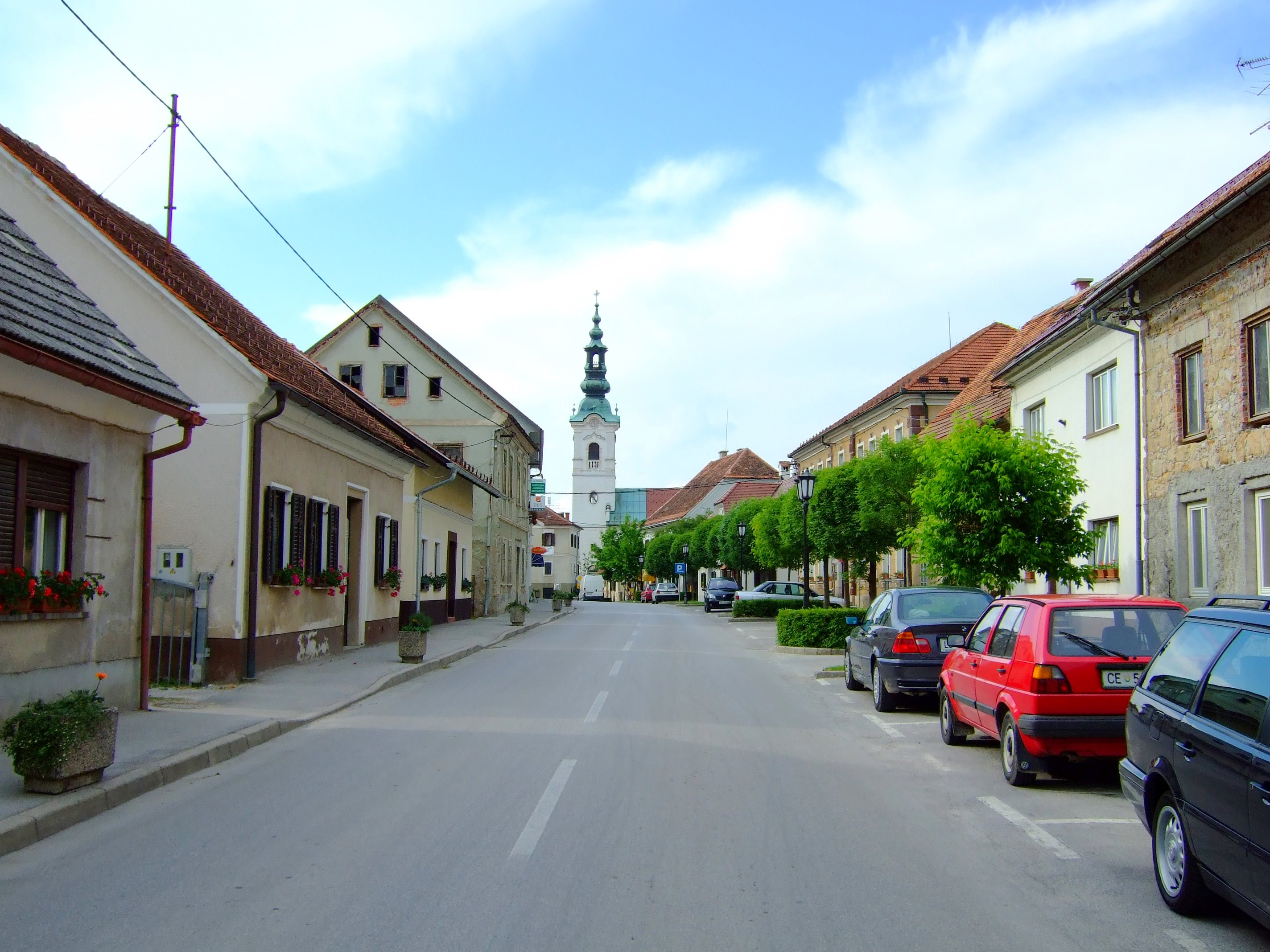

- Flag Seal

- Location in Slovenia
- Coordinates: 46°17′18.42″N 15°2′18.78″E
- Country: Slovenia
- Traditional region: Styria
- Statistical region: Savinja
- Municipality: Braslovče

Area
  - Total: 13.8 km^{2} (5.3 sq mi)
- Elevation: 306.8 m (1,007 ft)

Population (2020)
  - Total: 378
  - Density: 27.4/km^{2} (70.9/sq mi)
- Postal code: 3314 Braslovče

Braslovče (pronounced [ˈbɾaːslɔu̯tʃɛ], German: Frasslau) is a settlement in northern Slovenia. It is the seat of the Municipality of Braslovče. The area is part of the traditional region of Styria. It is now included in the Savinja Statistical Region.

Braslovče was first mentioned in written documents dating to 1140 AD. In the second half of the 14th century Braslovče was granted market rights by the Counts of Cilli. The parish church, built on a slight hill north of the settlement, is dedicated to the Assumption of Mary and belongs to the Roman Catholic Diocese of Celje. It was first mentioned in written documents from 1120. Most of the current building dates to the 18th and 19th centuries.
