= Dobrovlje, Braslovče =

Dobrovlje
- Location in Slovenia
- Coordinates: 46°18′4.44″N 14°59′13.75″E
- Country: Slovenia
- Traditional region: Styria
- Statistical region: Savinja
- Municipality: Braslovče

Area
  - Total: 13.8 km^{2} (5.3 sq mi)
- Elevation: 662.5 m (2,174 ft)

Population (2020)
  - Total: 147
  - Density: 10.7/km^{2} (27.6/sq mi)

Dobrovlje (pronounced [dɔˈbɾoːljɛ]) is a dispersed settlement in the Municipality of Braslovče in northern Slovenia. It lies in the hills west of Braslovče. The area is part of the traditional region of Styria. The municipality is now included in the Savinja Statistical Region.

There are two churches in the settlement. One is dedicated to Saints Peter and Paul and belongs to the Parish of Braslovče. It dates to the 16th century with major 18th- and 19th-century rebuilding. The second church is dedicated to Saint Urban and belongs to the Parish of Nazarje. It was first mentioned in written documents dating to 1426. The nave dates to the 17th century with some 19th-century adaptations.
