= Preserje pri Lukovici =

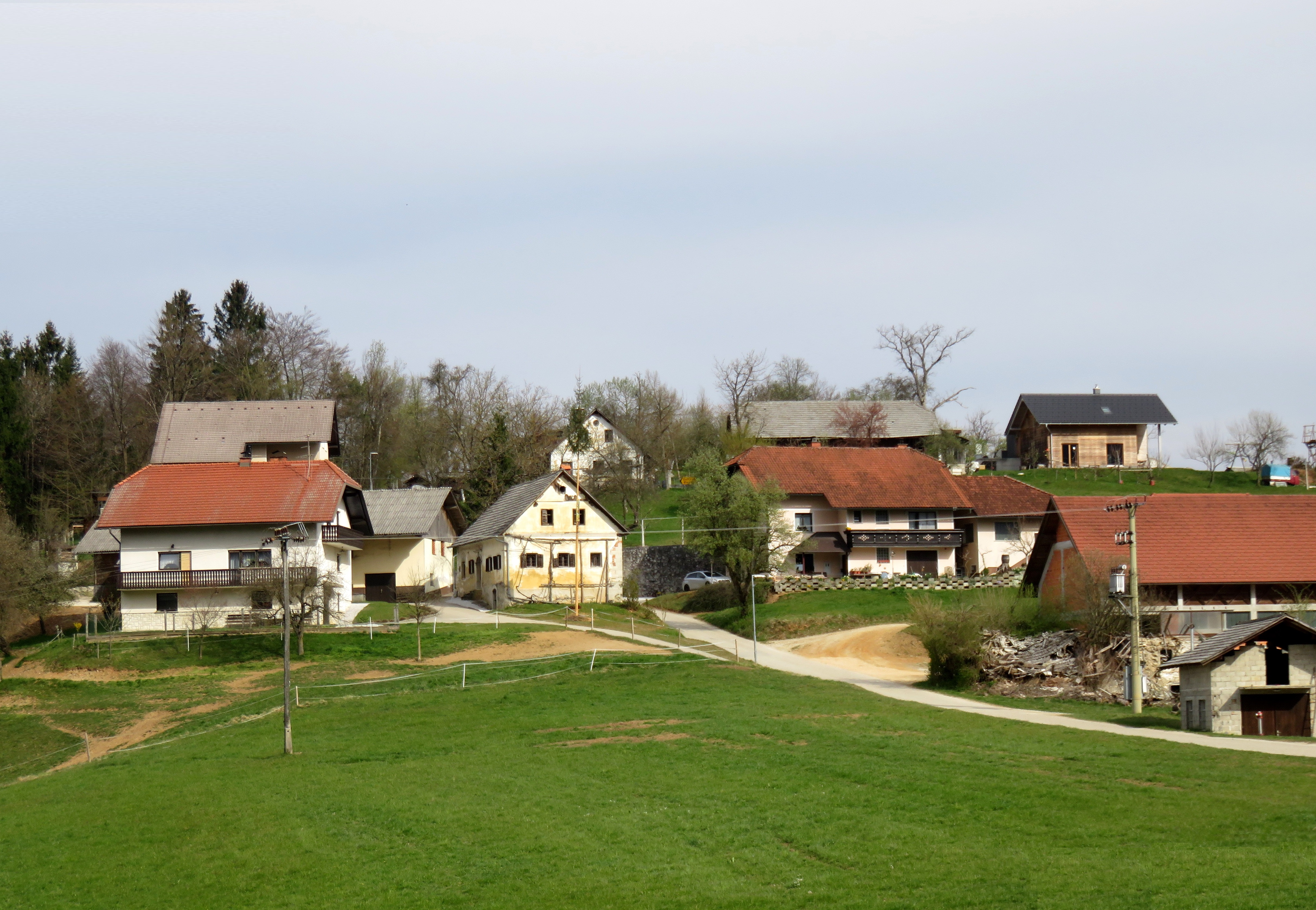

- Location in Slovenia
- Coordinates: 46°9′9.59″N 14°42′9.43″E
- Country: Slovenia
- Traditional region: Upper Carniola
- Statistical region: Central Slovenia
- Municipality: Lukovica

Area
  - Total: 0.94 km^{2} (0.36 sq mi)
- Elevation: 378.1 m (1,240 ft)

Population (2002)
  - Total: 75

Preserje pri Lukovici (pronounced [pɾeˈsɛːɾjɛ pɾi ˈluːkɔʋitsi]) is a settlement south of Lukovica pri Domžalah in the eastern part of the Upper Carniola region of Slovenia.

== Name ==
The name of the settlement was changed from Preserje to Preserje pri Lukovici in 1953.
