= Gomilsko =

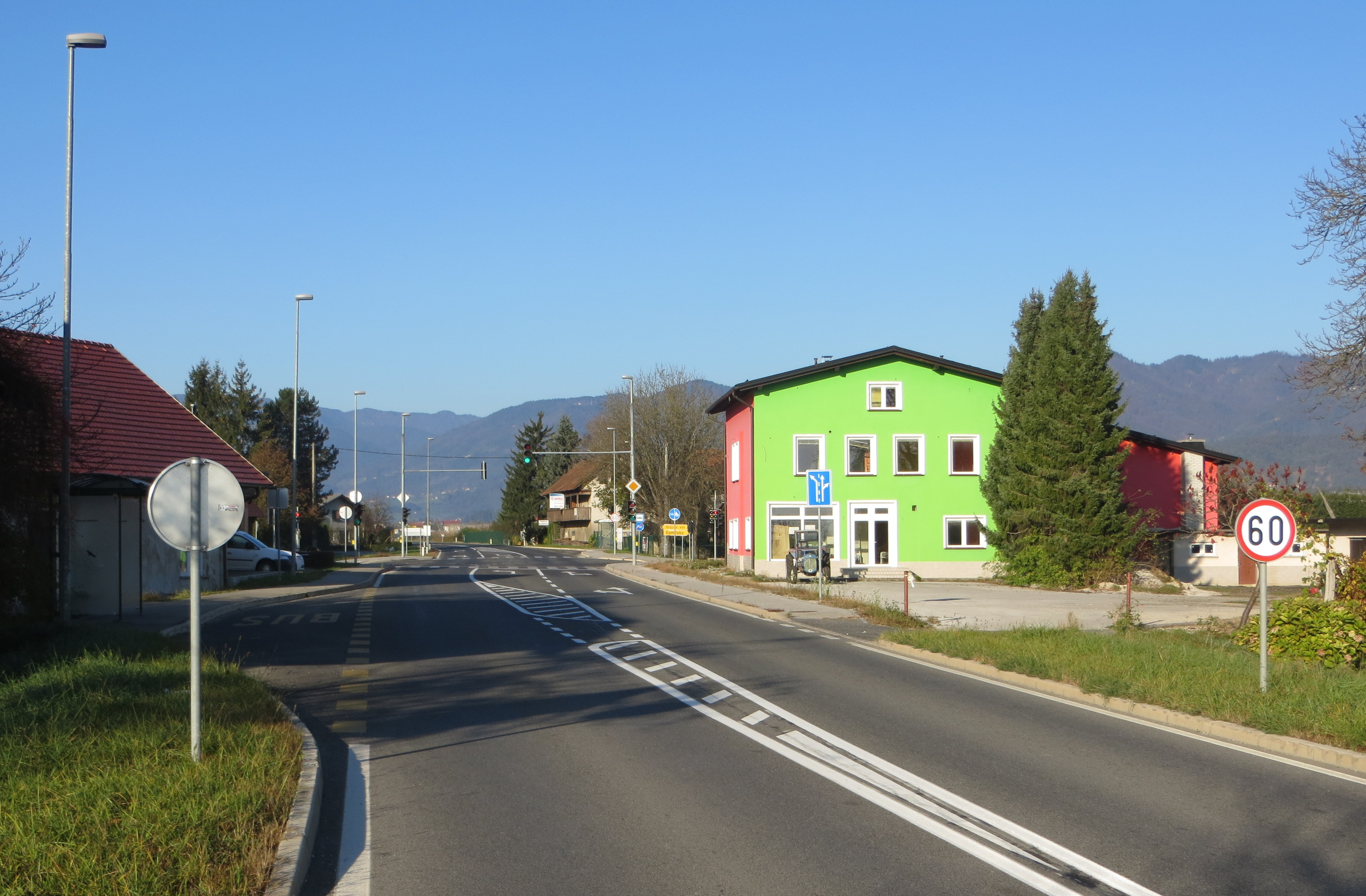

- Location in Slovenia
- Coordinates: 46°15′12.09″N 15°2′32.69″E
- Country: Slovenia
- Traditional region: Styria
- Statistical region: Savinja
- Municipality: Braslovče

Area
  - Total: 2.49 km^{2} (0.96 sq mi)
- Elevation: 290.2 m (952 ft)

Population (2020)
  - Total: 377
  - Density: 151/km^{2} (392/sq mi)

Gomilsko (pronounced [ɡɔˈmiːlskɔ]) is a village in the Municipality of Braslovče in northern Slovenia. The area is part of the traditional region of Styria. The municipality is now included in the Savinja Statistical Region.

== Church ==
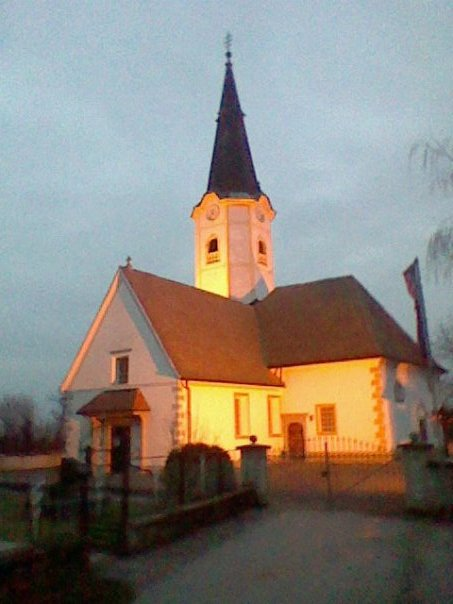
Saint Stephen's Church

The parish church in the settlement is dedicated to Saint Stephen and belongs to the Roman Catholic Diocese of Celje. It dates to the 15th century with numerous additions and rebuildings over the centuries.
