= Lake Žovnek =

Lake in Slovenia

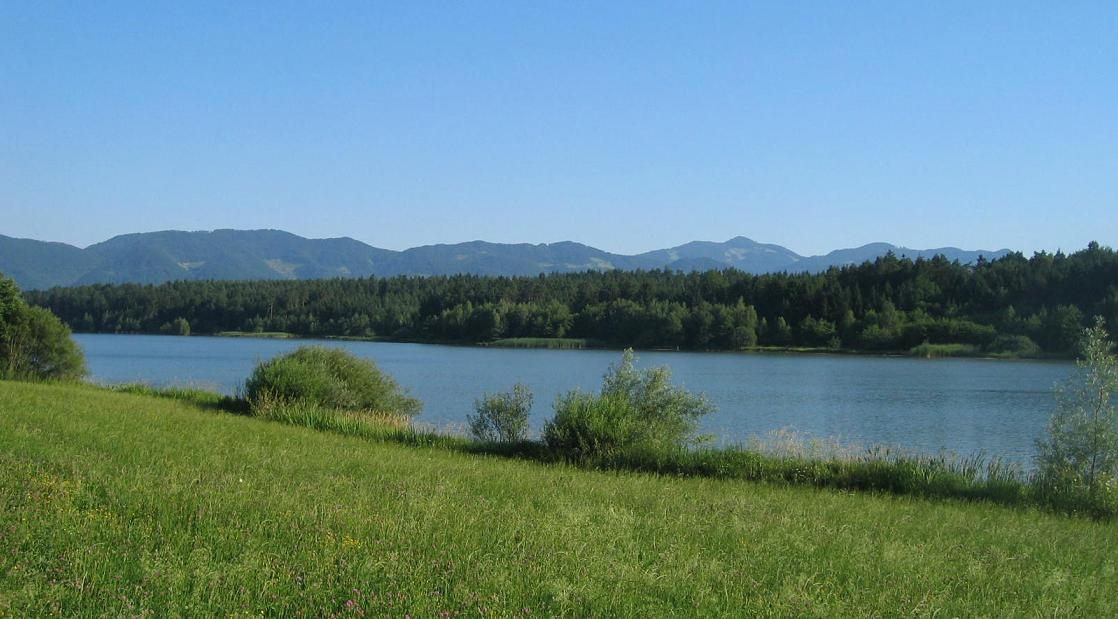

- Location within Slovenia
- Location: Styria, Slovenia
- Coordinates: 46°16′21″N 15°1′22″E
- Basin countries: Slovenia

Lake Žovnek (Slovene: Žovneško jezero) is a lake near Celje in Slovenia.
